= Screen Two =

British television series

Screen Two is a British television anthology drama series, produced by the BBC and transmitted on BBC2 from 1985 to 1998 (not to be confused with a run of films shown on BBC2 under the billing Screen 2 between April 1977 and March 1978).

== Format ==
Following the demise of the BBC's Play for Today, which ran from 1970 to 1984, producer Kenith Trodd was asked to formulate a new series of one-off television dramas. However, while Play for Today's style had been a largely studio-based form of theatre on television, the new series was shot entirely on film. This was an attempt by the BBC to repeat the success of Channel 4's television films, many of which had been released in cinemas.

From 1989 to 1998, a companion series, Screen One, was broadcast on the more mainstream BBC1. After appearing more sporadically in the mid-1990s, Screen Two ended with Series 15 as the BBC moved away from single dramas and concentrated production on series and serials instead. The last programme shown under the Screen Two name was Stephen Poliakoff's The Tribe in June 1998.

== Plays ==
Date	Title	Writer	Director	Producer
=== Series One ===
6 January 1985	Contact	A. F. N. Clarke	Alan Clarke	Terry Coles
The British army call Northern Ireland close to the southern border "bandit country". Patrolling here is always tense, tiring, unpredictable and usually very dangerous. Contact – the army term for an armed exchange with terrorists – can take place at any time. Cast: Sean Chapman, John Blundell, Ozzie Stevens, Jem Ahmet, Jason Cunliffe, Steve Fletcher, Graham Fletcher Cook, Gary Hailes, Chris Lee, Dennis Savage, Sam Smart, Steve Sweeney and James Mathews
13 January 1985	Poppyland	William Humble	John Madden	Richard Broke
On a hot August day in 1883 the theatre critic and writer Clement Scott met nineteen-year-old Louie Jermy, a Norfolk miller's daughter, for the first time. Cast: Alan Howard, Phoebe Nicholls, John McEnery, Richard Wilson, John Shrapnel, Jonathan Hyde, Norman Jones, Hilton McRae, Isla Blair, Tim Wylton, Kristin Milward, Martin Wyldeck, David Redgrave, Colin Rix, Susan Porrett, James Fagan and Paul Sirr
20 January 1985	Unfair Exchanges	Ken Campbell	Gavin Millar	Kenith Trodd
Mavis is plagued by increasingly mysterious and sinister telephone calls. Cast: Julie Walters, George Lapham, David Rappaport, Robert Kingswell, Bert Parnaby, Ken Campbell, Janet Henfrey, John Abineri, Christopher Ellison, Wolf Kahler, Malcolm Terris, Dave Lee Travis, Arnold Diamond, Henry Stamper, Charles Pemberton
27 January 1985	Knockback: Part One	Brian Phelan; Based on the book by Peter Adams & Shirley Cooklin	Piers Haggard	Philip Hinchcliffe
A prison visitor meets a murderer. Cast: Derrick O'Connor, Leslie Grantham, Pauline Collins, Laurence Harrington, Eric Mason, Paddy Joyce, Stanley McGeagh, Roy Pattison, Hilary Sesta, David Webb, Derek Ware, Ryan Freedman, Maurice Bush
3 February 1985	Knockback: Part Two	Brian Phelan; Based on the book by Peter Adams & Shirley Cooklin	Piers Haggard	Philip Hinchcliffe
Cast: Leslie Grantham, Pauline Collins, Laurence Harrington, Malcolm Terris, Frank Coda, Iain Rattray, Michael Barrington, Angus MacKay, Brenda Kempner
10 February 1985	Lent	Michael Wilcox	Peter Barber-Fleming	Tom Kinninmont
Cast: Harry Andrews, Constance Chapman, Fabia Drake, David Langton and Graham McGrath
17 February 1985	The Unknown Soldier	Raymond Hitchcock	Mike Vardy	Rosemary Hill
Cast: Nicholas Clay, David Neal, James Gaddas, Antony Carrick
24 February 1985	The Burston Rebellion	Elaine Morgan	Norman Stone	Ruth Caleb
Cast: Eileen Atkins, Bernard Hill, John Shrapnel, Geoffrey Chater, John Abineri, Frank Mills, Peter Benson, Jon Laurimore, Norman Jones, Peter Tuddenham, John Gleeson, Alan Mason
3 March 1985	Space Station: Milton Keynes	Leslie Stewart	Colin Rogers & Leslie Stewart	Colin Rogers
Cast: Patricia Garwood, Gian Sammarco, Nigel Lambert
10 March 1985	In The Secret State	Brian Phelan; From the novel by Robert McCrum	Christopher Morahan	Ann Scott
Cast: Frank Finlay, Thorley Walters, Michael Byrne, Ronald Fraser, Ken Campbell, Natasha Richardson, Hilary Minster, Malcolm Terris, Geoffrey Chater, Tony Selby, Roger Brierley, Gorden Kaye, Roger Lloyd-Pack, Ivor Salter, Stephen Churchett, Pip Donaghy, Emma Relph
=== Series Two ===
12 January 1986	The McGuffin	Michael Thomas; From the novel by John Bowen	Colin Bucksey	Kenith Trodd
Cast: Charles Dance, Mark Rylance, Ann Todd, Anna Massey, Chris Langham, Francis Matthews, Roger Lloyd-Pack, Brian Glover, Jerry Stiller, Stephen Lewis, Phyllis Logan
19 January 1986	The Silent Twins	Marjorie Wallace	Jon Amiel	Martin Thompson
Cast: Tony Robinson, John Savident, Clyde Pollitt
26 January 1986	Time After Time	Molly Keane; Screenplay by Andrew Davies	Bill Hays	Terry Coles
Cast: John Gielgud, Googie Withers, Helen Cherry, Brenda Bruce, Freddie Jones, Fiona Walker, George Baker
2 February 1986	Frankie & Johnnie	Paula Milne	Martin Campbell	Graham Benson
Cast: Hywel Bennett, Diana Hardcastle, Amanda Donohoe, Shelagh Fraser, Norman Jones
9 February 1986	Honest, Decent and True	Les Blair		Graham Benson
Cast: Derrick O'Connor, Adrian Edmondson, Gary Oldman, Richard E. Grant, Arabella Weir, Owen Brenman
16 February 1986	Song of Experience	Martin Allen	Stephen Frears	Innes Lloyd
Cast: Rachel Bell, Nigel Terry
23 February 1986	The Insurance Man	Alan Bennett	Richard Eyre	Innes Lloyd
Cast: Trevor Peacock, Alan MacNaughtan, Teddy Turner, Vivian Pickles, Tony Haygarth, Jim Broadbent, Daniel Day-Lewis, Richenda Carey, Geoffrey Palmer, Roger Hammond, Benjamin Whitrow, Oona Kirsch, Richard Kane
2 March 1986	Hotel du Lac	Christopher Hampton; From the novel by Anita Brookner	Giles Foster	Sue Birtwistle
Cast: Anna Massey, Denholm Elliott, Googie Withers, Julia McKenzie, Patricia Hodge, Irene Handl, Barry Foster, Geoffrey Chater, Jeffry Wickham, Patsy Byrne, Colette Gleeson
9 March 1986	The Russian Soldier	Brian Phelan	Gavin Millar	Alan Shallcross
Cast: Warren Clarke, Alan MacNaughtan, Patrick Malahide, Jerome Flynn, June Page, Iain Rattray, Eileen Helsby, Dominic Allan, Charles Pemberton
16 March 1986	Blood Hunt	Neil Gunn (novel); Adapted by Stewart Conn	Peter Barber-Fleming	Norman McCandlish
Cast: Iain Glen, Andrew Keir, Nigel Stock, Michael Carter, Arabella Weir, Jon Croft
23 March 1986	Shergar	Bill Morrison	Nigel Finch	Ruth Caleb
Cast: Stephen Rea, Gary Waldhorn, Ian McElhinney, Dermot Crowley, Peter Caffrey
30 March 1986	Hard Travelling	Hugh Stoddart	Colin Gregg	Andree Molyneux
Cast: Suzanne Burden, Tom Bell, Jack Shepherd, Michael Gough, Perry Benson, Denis Carey, Colette O'Neil, Gordon Salkilld, Sarah Berger
6 April 1986	Double Image	Stephen Davis	Mick Jackson	Graham Massey
Cast: Tommy Lee Jones, David Healy
=== Series Three ===
4 January 1987	Coast to Coast	Stan Hey	Sandy Johnson	Graham Benson
Cast: Lenny Henry, John Shea, Peter Vaughan, George Baker, Pete Postlethwaite, Cherie Lunghi, Al Matthews, Edward Peel, Neville Smith, Tony Haygarth
11 January 1987	Blunt	Robin Chapman	John Glenister	Martin Thompson
Cast: Anthony Hopkins, Ian Richardson, Michael Williams, Geoffrey Chater, Albert Welling, Michael McStay, Christopher Denham
18 January 1987	Will You Love Me Tomorrow	Adrian Shergold, David Snodin	Adrian Shergold	David Snodin
Cast: Joanne Whalley, Tilly Vosburgh, Phil Daniels, Iain Glen, Beverley Sowden (aka Callard), Richard Ireson
25 January 1987	After Pilkington	Simon Gray	Christopher Morahan	Kenith Trodd
Cast: Bob Peck, Miranda Richardson, Gary Waldhorn, Barry Foster, Derek Ware, John Gill
1 February 1987	East of Ipswich	Michael Palin	Tristram Powell	Innes Lloyd
Cast: Edward Rawle-Hicks, John Nettleton, Pat Heywood, Graham Crowden, Janine Duvitski, Timothy Bateson, Roger Brierley, Tip Tipping, Wayne Michaels, Oona Kirsch, Phyllida Hewat, June Ellis
8 February 1987	Naming the Names	Anne Devlin	Stuart Burge	Chris Parr
Cast: Sylvestra Le Touzel, Michael Maloney, Mick Ford, James Ellis, Eileen Way
15 February 1987	Northanger Abbey	Maggie Wadey from the novel by Jane Austen	Giles Foster	Louis Marks
Cast: Katharine Schlesinger, Peter Firth, Robert Hardy, Googie Withers, Geoffrey Chater, Elvi Hale, Helen Fraser, Elaine Ives-Cameron
22 February 1987	Visitors	Dennis Potter	Piers Haggard	Kenith Trodd
Cast: John Standing, Michael Brandon, Nicola Pagett, Glynis Barber
1 March 1987	Heaven on Earth	Margaret Atwood and Peter Pearson	Allan Kroeker	W. Paterson Ferns
Cast: Torquil Campbell, Sarah Polley, Fiona Reid
8 March 1987	Inappropriate Behaviour	Andrew Davies	Paul Seed	Terry Coles
Cast: Charlotte Coleman, Anne Reid
15 March 1987	Going Home	Christopher Green	Terence Ryan	Ray Marshall
Cast: Nicholas Campbell, Milan Cheylov, Albert Schultz, Paul Maxwell, Clyde Pollitt
29 March 1987	Quartermaine's Terms	Simon Gray	Bill Hays	Louis Marks
Cast: Eleanor Bron, Edward Fox, Clive Francis, John Gielgud, Peter Jeffrey, Tessa Peake-Jones
5 April 1987	On the Palm	Dave Sheasby	Michael Whyte	Kenith Trodd
Cast: Phillip Jackson, Cathy Tyson, James Hazeldine, Peter Martin, Liz Smith
17 April 1987	Hedgehog Wedding	Elizabeth Spender	Tim King	Innes Lloyd
Cast: Sheila Allen, Lynsey Baxter, Frederick Treves, Aimée Delamain, David Blake Kelly
19 April 1987	The Children of Dynmouth	William Trevor	Peter Hammond	Rosemary Hill
Cast: Simon Fox, John Bird, Avril Elgar, Peter Jones, Gary Raymond
=== Series Four ===
10 January 1988	The Vision	William Nicholson	Norman Stone	David M. Thompson
Cast: Eileen Atkins, Dirk Bogarde, Helena Bonham Carter, Lynda Bellingham, Alan Curtis, Bruce Boa, Bruce Montague, Lee Remick, Paul Maxwell
17 January 1988	Dead Lucky	Ruth Rendell (novel), Barbara Rennie	Barbara Rennie	Ann Scott
Cast: Phil Davis, Nicholas Farrell, William Gaminara, Donald Douglas
24 January 1988	Sweet as You Are	William Nicholson	Angela Pope	Ruth Caleb
Cast: Liam Neeson, Miranda Richardson, Philip Bird, Philip McGough
31 January 1988	Stanley	Elaine Morgan	Anna Benson Gyles	Ruth Caleb
Cast: Lesley Dunlop, David Horovitch, Juliet Stevenson, Anton Lesser, Peter Birrel, Norman Jones, Roger Brierley, Wendy Gifford, Sarah Berger
7 February 1988	Border	Tim Rose Price from a story by Jiri Stanislav	Misha Williams	Terry Coles
Cast: Edita Brychta, Daniel Hill, Norman Jones, Catherine Schell, Lynn Farleigh, Roy Evans, Hana Maria Pravda, Paul Humpoletz, Gordon Faith, Richard Ireson, Roy Pattison
6 March 1988	Lovebirds	Barry Collins	Stephen Whittaker	Chris Parr
Cast: Stephen Bent, Linda Henry, Shaheen Khan, Paul Bhattacharjee, Lloyd McGuire, Tracey Wilkinson
13 March 1988	Shadow on the Earth	David Kane	Chris Bernard	David M Thompson
Cast: Billy Hartman, Jonathan Battersby
27 March 1988	Reasonable Force	P. G. Duggan	Jim Goddard	Martyn Auty
Cast: John Hannah, Warren Clarke, Adrian Dunbar, William Thomas, Michael Melia, Colette O'Neil, Arthur Cox, Crawford Logan
3 April 1988	The Temptation of Eileen Hughes	Brian Moore	Tristram Powell	Martin Thompson
Cast: Angharad Rees, Birdy Sweeney
17 April 1988	Lucky Sunil	Andrew Davies; Based on a story by Tariq Yunus	Michael Caton-Jones	Andree Molyneux
Cast: Kulvinder Ghir, Michelle Collins, Hugh Cornwell, Niamh Cusack, Richenda Carey, Albert Moses, Benjamin Whitrow, Ahmed Khalil, Tariq Yunus, Vass Anderson
24 April 1988	Run for the Lifeboat	Douglas Livingstone		Carol Parks
Cast: Stacey Tendeter, Jeff Rawle, Tenniel Evans, David Garfield, Sion Tudor Owen, Stephen Thorne
=== Series Five ===
8 January 1989	Death of a Son	Tony Marchant	Ross Devenish	Martin Thompson
Cast: Lynn Redgrave, Jay Simpson, Oliver Ford Davies, Frederick Treves, Jerome Willis, Richard Moore, Derek Ware, Roy Evans, Glyn Pritchard
15 January 1989	Angel Voices	Stephen Wakelam	Michael Darlow	Andree Molyneux
Cast: Michael Williams, Alan Rothwell, Malcolm Hebden, Lee Woods
22 January 1989	Flying in the Branches	Anna Fodorova	Eva Kolouchova	Martyn Auty
Cast: Ralph Bates, Edita Brychta, Susan Fleetwood, Ian McNeice, Donald Gee, Tim Barker
29 January 1989	Words of Love	Philip Norman	Colin Nutley	Brian Eastman
Cast: Charlie Creed-Miles, Tom Bell, Liz Smith
5 February 1989	Leaving	Daniel Boyle	Sandy Johnson	Barry Hanson
Cast: Maggie Bell, Paul Young, Hugh Martin
12 February 1989	Virtuoso	William Humble based on the book by Brenda Lucas Ogdon and Michael Kerr	Tony Smith	Philip Hinchcliffe
Cast: Alfred Molina, Alison Steadman, Philip Locke, Mark Wing-Davey, Bruce Boa, John Heard, James Nesbitt, Trevor Martin, Ling Tai
19 February 1989	The Picnic	Lesley Bruce	Paul Seed	Terry Coles
Cast: Billie Whitelaw, Iain Glen, Brenda Fricker, Ross Kemp, Phil Smeeton
26 February 1989	The Firm	Al Hunter Ashton	Alan Clarke	David M. Thompson
Cast: Gary Oldman, Lesley Manville, Philip Davis, Steve McFadden, Roderick Smith, Mark Monero, Phillip Joseph
5 March 1989	Here is the News	G. F. Newman	Udayan Prasad	Kenith Trodd
Cast: Richard E. Grant, Jim Carter, Heathcote Williams, Josette Simon, Michael Melia, Simon Rouse, Max Harvey, Christopher Burgess, Alan MacNaughtan
12 March 1989	Ice Dance	Stephen Lowe	Alan Dossor	Michael Wearing
Cast: Warren Clarke
19 March 1989	Sitting Targets	Peter Ransley	Jenny Wilkes	Andrée Molyneux
Cast: Gina Bellman, Jonathan Hyde, Phyllis Logan, John Bowe, Leslee Udwin (actor and consultant), Mary Wimbush, Philip Bond, Andrew Forbes, Nick Burnell, Rupert Holliday-Evans, Jerome Willis, Ian Thompson
26 March 1989	Defrosting the Fridge	Ray Connolly	Sandy Johnson	Terry Coles
Cast: Joe Don Baker, Phyllis Logan, Togo Igawa, Victor Maddern, Russell Floyd, Richard LeParmentier, William Ilkley, Michael Crane, David Redgrave
=== Series Six ===
14 January 1990	Old Flames	Simon Gray	Christopher Morahan	Kenith Trodd
Cast: Stephen Fry, Simon Callow, Miriam Margolyes, Celia Imrie, Harry Littlewood, Roger Hammond
21 January 1990	The Man from the Pru	Robert Smith	Rob Rohrer	Roger Gregory
Cast: Jonathan Pryce, Anna Massey, Susannah York, Tom Georgeson, Philip Latham, Geoffrey Hughes
28 January 1990	Drowning in the Shallow End	Leigh Jackson	Colin Gregg	Susi Hush
Cast: Paul McGann, Phoebe Nicholls, Adrian Dunbar, Arkie Whiteley, Alfred Molina, ... Sam Preston, Caroline Guthrie, Simone Parfaitt, Max Stafford-Clark, Danny Webb, Rupert Holliday-Evans, Liz Smith, Katherine Best, Ian Redford, Tony Slattery, Michele Wade, Fiona Victory, Emma D'Inverno, Ric Wadsworth, Janet Behan, Anna Sawa, Georgia Clarke, Ruddy L. Davis, Frederik de Groot, Martina Berne, Olivier Pierre, Hal Lindes and Denise Margetts
4 February 1990	Close Relations	Stanley Price	Adrian Shergold	Ruth Caleb
Cast: James Hazeldine, Clare Holman, Rosalind March, Annie Gurney, Eric Heath, June Barrie, Glynis Brooks, Michael Egan, Robert Morgan, Richard Cubison, Andrew Wilde, Adie Allen, William Knightley, Daphne Neville, Mark Draper, Stephen Bent, Ian Sharp, Amanda Drewry, Peter Bayliss, Nigel Le Vaillant and Wilfred Grove
11 February 1990	The Impossible Spy	Marty Ross and Douglas Livingstone	Jim Goddard	Graham Massey and David Goldstein
Cast: Eli Wallach
18 February 1990	He's Asking for Me	Boleslaw Sulik	Witold Starecki	Kenith Trodd
Cast: Maggie O'Neill, David Threlfall, Thorley Walters, Gina McKee
25 February 1990	Sometime in August	Bernard MacLaverty	John Glenister	Norman McCandlish
Cast: Mary Morris
4 March 1990	Small Zones	Jim Hawkins from an idea by Simon Thirsk	Michael Whyte	Terry Coles
Cast: Sean Bean, William Ilkley, Christopher Saul, Stephanie Turner, Jonathan Burn
11 March 1990	Circles of Deceit	Nina Bawden (novel); Stephen Wakelam (screenplay)	Stuart Burge	Louis Marks
Cast: Edward Fox, Jane Lapotaire, Brenda Bruce, John Bird, John Nettleton, Stefan Schwartz
18 March 1990	The Lorelei	Nick Dunning	Terry Johnson	Robert Cooper
Cast: Amanda Redman, Michael Maloney, John Nettleton
25 March 1990	Children Crossing	Trevor Preston	Angela Pope	David M Thompson
Cast: Peter Firth, Saskia Reeves, Bob Peck
1 April 1990	Kremlin Farewell	Nigel Williams	Tristram Powell	David M Thompson
Cast: Freddie Jones, Kenneth Colley, Richard Wilson, Bernard Kay, Graham Crowden, Polly Walker
=== Series Seven ===
13 January 1991	Heading Home	David Hare		Rick McCallum
Cast: Gary Oldman, Joely Richardson, Michael Bryant, Leon Eagles, David Schneider
27 January 1991	Hallelujah Anyhow	Jean "Binta" Breeze and Matthew Jacobs	Matthew Jacobs	David Stacey
Cast: Doña Croll, Keith David, George Harris, Ram John Holder
3 February 1991	Korczak	Agnieszka Holland	Andrzej Wajda	David M Thompson
Cast: Wojtek Pszoniak
10 February 1991	Fellow Traveller	Michael Eaton	Philip Saville	Michael Wearing
Cast: Ron Silver, Imogen Stubbs, Daniel J. Travanti, Hart Bochner, Richard Wilson, Doreen Mantle, Allan Mitchell, Roger Hammond, Trevor Cooper
17 February 1991	102 Boulevard Haussmann	Alan Bennett	Udayan Prasad	Innes Lloyd
Cast: Alan Bates, Paul Rhys, Janet McTeer, Philip McGough and Celia Imrie
24 February 1991	A Private Life	Andrew Davies	Francis Gerard	Francis Gerard
Cast: Bill Flynn, Jana Cilliers, Embeth Davidtz
3 March 1991	The Laughter of God	Tony Bicat		Bill Shapter
Cast: Peter Firth, Amanda Donohoe, Sylvia Syms, Nick Hobbs, John Forgeham
10 March 1991	Morphine and Dolly Mixtures	Carol Ann Courtney (novel); Karl Francis	Karl Francis	Ruth Kenley-Letts
Cast: Patrick Bergin, Joanna Griffiths
17 March 1991	Do Not Disturb	Timberlake Wertenbaker	Nicholas Renton	Simon Passmore
Cast: Frances Barber, Peter Capaldi, Stefan Schwartz, Patrick Godfrey, Dermot Crowley, Roger Brierley
24 March 1991	Dreaming	William Mcllvanney	Mike Alexander	Andy Park
Based on a short story by William McIlvanney Cast: Ewen Bremner, Mary McCusker, Deacon Blue, Billy Connolly and Marianne Faithfull
31 March 1991	They Never Slept	Simon Gray	Udayan Prasad	Kenith Trodd
Cast: Edward Fox, Emily Morgan, James Fleet, Peter Czajowski, Pete Postlethwaite, Derek Fowlds, Imelda Staunton
7 April 1991	Aimee	Guy Hibbert	Pedr James	Michael Wearing
Cast: Donald Sumpter, Juliet Stevenson, Edward Burnham, Tony Steedman
=== Series Eight ===
19 January 1992	The Grass Arena	Frank Deasy, based on John Healy's autobiography	Gillies MacKinnon	Ruth Baumgarten
Cast: Mark Rylance, Pete Postlethwaite, Harry Landis, Tim Barlow, Jon Croft
26 January 1992	Flea Bites	Stephen Lowe	Alan Dossor	Alan Dossor and Peter Kendal
Cast: Nigel Hawthorne, Tim Healy
2 February 1992	The Count of Solar	David Nokes	Tristram Powell	Ruth Caleb
Cast: David Calder, Tyron Woolfe, Patrick Godfrey, Peter Benson, Janet Henfrey, Lisa Bowerman, Arthur Hewlett
9 February 1992	The Lost Language of Cranes	Sean Mathias; David Leavitt (novel)	Nigel Finch	Ruth Caleb
Cast: Brian Cox, Eileen Atkins, Angus MacFadyen, Corey Parker, René Auberjonois, John Schlesinger and Cathy Tyson
16 February 1992	The Object of Beauty	Michael Lindsay-Hogg		John S Denny
Cast: John Malkovich, Andie MacDowell, Joss Ackland, Bill Paterson, Jack Shepherd, Roger Lloyd-Pack, Stephen Churchett, Richard Ireson
23 February 1992	My Sister-Wife	Meera Syal	Lesley Manning	Ruth Baumgarten
Cast: Meera Syal, Paul Bhattacharjee, Shaheen Khan, Peter Howell, Mary Jo Randle, Sakuntala Ramanee
1 March 1992	Truly Madly Deeply	Anthony Minghella		Robert Cooper
Cast: Juliet Stevenson, Alan Rickman and Bill Paterson
8 March 1992	The Common Pursuit	Simon Gray	Christopher Morahan	Kenith Trodd
Cast: Stella Gonet, Kevin McNally, Tim Roth, Stephen Fry, Ian Bannen
15 March 1992	Utz	Hugh Whitemore; Bruce Chatwin (novel)	George Sluizer	John Goldschmidt
Cast: Armin Mueller-Stahl, Brenda Fricker, Peter Riegert, Paul Scofield, Pauline Melville, Anthony Donovan
22 March 1992	The Law Lord	John Cooper	Jim Goddard	Simon Passmore
Cast: Anthony Andrews, Bernard Hill, Tom Baker, T. P. McKenna, Tim Preece, George Harris, Roger Brierley, John Stratton, Leonard Maguire, Harriet Reynolds, Gian Sammarco, Ellie Beaven
29 March 1992	The Last Romantics	Nigel Williams	Jack Gold	David M Thompson
Cast: Ian Holm, Sara Kestelman, Leo McKern, Alan Cumming, Charles Dale
5 April 1992	Enchanted April	Peter Barnes; Elizabeth von Arnim (novel)	Mike Newell	Ann Scott
Cast: Miranda Richardson, Josie Lawrence, Polly Walker, Joan Plowright, Alfred Molina, Jim Broadbent, Michael Kitchen
19 April 1992	Memento Mori	Muriel Spark (novel); Jack Clayton	Jack Clayton	Louis Marks
Cast: Maggie Smith, Michael Hordern, Renée Asherson, Stephanie Cole, Maurice Denham, Thora Hird, Zoë Wanamaker, Damaris Hayman, Leonard Maguire, Anna Cropper, Preston Lockwood, Arthur Hewlett, John Baskcomb, Walter Sparrow, Aimée Delamain, Cyril Cusack, Mary Healey
=== Series Nine ===
17 January 1993	The Clothes in the Wardrobe	Alice Thomas Ellis (novel); Martin Sherman	Waris Hussein	Norma Heyman
Cast: Jeanne Moreau, Joan Plowright, Julie Walters, Lena Headey, Catherine Schell, David Threlfall, John Wood, Tommy Duggan, Roger Lloyd-Pack, Gwyneth Strong
24 January 1993	Edward II	Christopher Marlowe (play); Derek Jarman; Stephen McBride; Ken Butler	Derek Jarman	Steve Clark-Hall; Antony Root
Cast: Steven Waddington, Tilda Swinton, Andrew Tiernan, Dudley Sutton, Jerome Flynn, Roger Hammond, Allan Corduner, Annie Lennox
31 January 1993	The Long Roads	John McGrath	Tristram Powell	Peter Kendal
Cast: Robert Urquhart, Edith MacArthur, John Owens, Bhasker Patel, Metin Yenal, Brian Miller
7 February 1993	Femme Fatale	Simon Gray	Udayan Prasad	Kenith Trodd
Cast: Simon Callow, Donald Pleasence, Colin Welland, Jason Durr, Rosalie Crutchley, Al Hunter Ashton
14 February 1993	Dead Romantic	Simon Brett (novel); Jan Ashdown	Patrick Lau	Chris Griffin
Cast: Janet McTeer, Clive Wood, Jonny Lee Miller, Elspet Gray, Simon Rouse, Ralph Arliss, Laurence Harrington
21 February 1993	The Cormorant	Stephen Gregory (novel); Peter Ransley	Peter Markham	Ruth Kenley-Letts
Cast: Ralph Fiennes, Helen Schlesinger
28 February 1993	Prague	Ian Sellar		Christopher Young
Cast: Alan Cumming, Sandrine Bonnaire and Bruno Ganz
7 March 1993	Voices in the Garden	Dirk Bogarde (novel) adapted by Lee Langley	Pierre Boutron	Christian Charret; Peter Jefferies
Cast: Anouk Aimée, Joss Ackland, Samuel West
28 March 1993	Maria's Child	Malcolm McKay		Kenith Trodd
Cast: Yolanda Vazquez, Nicholas Woodeson
4 April 1993	The Snapper	Roddy Doyle	Stephen Frears	Lynda Myles
Cast: Tina Kellegher, Colm Meaney
19 December 1993	The Trial	Franz Kafka (novel); Harold Pinter (adaptation)	David Jones	Louis Marks
Cast: Kyle MacLachlan, Anthony Hopkins, Juliet Stevenson, Alfred Molina, David Thewlis, Michael Kitchen, Tony Haygarth, Paul Brooke, Roger Lloyd-Pack, Patrick Godfrey, Don Henderson, John Woodvine
30 December 1993	The Railway Station Man	Jennifer Johnston (novel); Shelagh Delaney (dramatisation)	Michael Whyte	Andrée Molyneux; Roger Randall-Cutler
Cast: Julie Christie, Donald Sutherland
=== Series Ten ===
2 March 1994	Genghis Cohn	Romain Gary (novel); Stanley Price	Elijah Moshinsky	Ruth Caleb
Cast: Robert Lindsay, Antony Sher, Diana Rigg, John Wells, Frances de la Tour, Paul Brooke, Cheryl Fergison, Daniel Craig, Shaun Dingwall, Charles Dale, Arnold Yarrow, Patrick Godfrey Awards: American cable television's Ace Award for best screenplay – Stanley Price
9 March 1994	Skallagrigg	William Horwood (novel); Nigel Williams	Richard Spence	John Chapman
Cast: Bernard Hill, Kerry Noble, John McArdle, Tom Tomalin, Karl Andrew Purden, Adam Walker, Jamie Beddard, Billie Whitelaw, Nick Brimble, Richard Briers, Tracy Gillman, Ian Dury, Kevin Whately, Linda Bassett and Nabil Shaban Awards: BAFTA Television Award for Best Single Drama in 1995
16 March 1994	All Things Bright and Beautiful	Barry Devlin		Katy McGuinness
Cast: Ciarán Fitzgerald, Tom Wilkinson, Gabriel Byrne, Kevin McNally, Gabrielle Reidy, Lorraine Pilkington, Marie Jones and John Keegan
23 March 1994	The Reflecting Skin	Philip Ridley		Dominic Anciano; Ray Burdis
Cast: Viggo Mortensen, Lindsay Duncan, Jeremy Cooper, Sheila Moore and Duncan Fraser
30 March 1994	O Mary This London	Shane Connaughton	Suri Krishnamma	Helen Greaves
Cast: Jason Barry, Oba Seagrave, Dylan Tighe, Ram John Holder, Lesley Manville, John Otway, Meera Syal, Frank Kelly, Leslie French, Richard Strange, Declan Mulholland, Arthur Hewlett and Philip Bloomfield
6 April 1994	Dirtysomething	Peter Saimi; Carl Prechezer	Carl Prechezer	
Cast: Rachel Weisz, Rufus Sewell, Bernard Hill, Paul Reynolds, Walter Sparrow, Susannah Doyle
13 April 1994	Return to Blood River	Douglas Livingstone	Jane Howell	Peter Goodchild
Cast: Kevin McNally, Warren Clarke, Frances Barber, Samantha Bond, Brian Capron, Ilario Bisi-Pedro and Stephen Thorne
20 April 1994	Henri	John Forte	Simon Shore	Colin Tucker
Cast: Kara Bowman, Sean Caffrey
27 April 1994	Continental Drift	Adisakdi Tantimedh	Paul Tickell	Tatiana Kennedy
Cast: Dmitri Shevchenko, Olga Rodina, Natasha Bain and Andrei Smolyakov
4 May 1994	Ethan Frome	Edith Wharton (novel); Richard Nelson	John Madden	Stan Wlodkowski
Cast: Liam Neeson, Patricia Arquette, Joan Allen, Tate Donovan, Katherine Houghton, Stephen Mendillo, Debbon Ayer, Jay Goede, Rob Campbell
11 May 1994	Hope in the Year Two	Trevor Griffiths	Elijah Moshinsky	Ann Scott
Cast: Jack Shepherd, Tom Bowles and Sophie Unfield
18 May 1994	Sin Bin	Catherine Johnson	George Case	Charles Pattinson
Cast: Pete Postlethwaite, George Costigan, Kathy Burke, James Cosmo, Moya Brady, Anna Keaveney, Ruth Sheen, Graham Aggrey, Angus Barnett, Dave Hill, Jackie Downey, David Hatton, Phil Rose, Steve Swinscoe, Tina Malone and Tommy Wright
25 May 1994	Men of the Month	Rona Munro	Jean Stewart	Caroline Oulton
Cast: Douglas Hodge, Akim Mogaji, Clare Higgins, Britta Smith, Ricci Harnett, Nicholas Woodeson, Alexander Morton, Claire Hackett, Eddie Osei, Emer McCourt and Sandy Ratcliff
1 June 1994	Safe	Al Ashton; Billy Bragg (songs)	Antonia Bird	David M Thompson
Cast: Kate Hardie, Aidan Gillen, George Costigan, Andrew Tiernan, Steve Mackintosh, Robert Carlyle, Carol Leader, Neil Smals, Cheryl Maiker, Marc O'Shea, Kevin Walsh, Louise Heaney, Marsha Thompson, Jimmy Gallagher, Cheryl Hall and Vincent Pickering Awards: BAFTA Television Award for Best Single Drama in 1994; Winner of the Best New Director Award at the 1993 Edinburgh International Film Festival. Also co-winner ... won two awards at the 1993 Edinburgh International Film Festival
8 June 1994	A Landing on the Sun	Michael Frayn	Nicholas Renton	David Snodin
Cast: Robert Glenister, Susan Fleetwood, Roger Allam, Judith Scott, Patrick Godfrey, Oliver Ford Davies, Jane Wymark, June Barrie, Michael Fitzgerald, August Aharris, Marlene Sidaway, Mary MacLeod, Sharon Bower, Robert Langdon Lloyd and Nicholas Haley
15 June 1994	In the Cold Light of Day	Richard Monks		Tatiana Kennedy
Cast: Frances Barber, Jim Carter, Stephanie Cole, Bernard Hepton, Ronald Pickup, Margery Withers, Laura Tristram, Dean Burgin, Michael Friel, Denis Lill and Linda Bassett
22 June 1994	Criminal	Vincent O'Connell	Corin Campbell-Hill	Hilary Salmon
Cast: Paul Popplewell, Leanne Whalley, Cheryl Godber, Nicky Evans, Jensen Marriott, June Watson, Lynda Rooke, Richard Mayes and Ray Ashcroft Awards: Won Royal Television Society Best Single Drama in 1995
29 June 1994	A Little Bit of Lippy	Martyn Hesford	Chris Bernard	George Faber
Cast: Kenneth Cranham, Rachel Davies, Alison Swann, Danny Cunningham, Elizabeth Bradley, Bette Bourne, Tina Earl, Cliff Howells, Alan David, Sandra Gough and Finetime Fontayne
26 December 1994	Midnight Movie	Dennis Potter	Renny Rye	Dennis Potter
Cast: Jim Carter, Louise Germaine, Brian Dennehy, Colin Salmon, Anna Cropper, John Cater, Stephen Greif
2 January 1995	The Blue Boy	Paul Murton		Kate Swann
A couple expecting their first baby spend a few days in the Scottish Highlands, hoping to make a fresh start to their relationship - only for the past to creep up on the present with devastating results. Cast: Emma Thompson, Adrian Dunbar, Eleanor Bron, David Horovitch, Joanna Roth, Phyllida Law, Barry Molloy, Sandy Welsh, Jim Twaddle, Carol Ann Crawford and Lewis Howden
=== Series Eleven ===
26 March 1995	A Very Open Prison	Guy Jenkin		Geoffrey Perkins
Cast: Tom Wilkinson, Ronald Pickup, Stephen Tompkinson, Emily Mortimer, Peter Wingfield, Michael Hordern, Geoffrey Whitehead, John Fortune, Celia Imrie, Julian Fellowes, Michael Fenton-Stevens, William Hoyland, Trevor Cooper, Jason Barry, David Sterne, Andy Hamilton, Susannah Hitching, Frederick Warder, Andrew Barrow, Ben Forster, Andrew Castell, Charlotte Attenborough and Sue Carpenter
2 April 1995	Life After Life	Graham Reid	Tim Fywell	Anthony Rowe
Leo Doyle, in his mid-30s and single, is released into ceasefire Belfast after serving a life sentence for an IRA murder. Desperate for a new cause, he tries to rekindle an affair with his ex-fiancee. Cast: Lorcan Cranitch, Bridget Turner, Ingrid Craigie, Jonathan Arun, Des McAleer, Michelle Fairley
16 April 1995	Persuasion	Jane Austen (novel); Nick Dear	Roger Michell	Fiona Finlay
Cast: Amanda Root as Anne Elliot, Ciarán Hinds, Susan Fleetwood, Corin Redgrave, Fiona Shaw, John Woodvine, Phoebe Nicholls, Samuel West, Sophie Thompson, Judy Cornwell, Simon Russell Beale, Felicity Dean, Roger Hammond, Emma Roberts, Victoria Hamilton, Robert Glenister, Richard McCabe, Helen Schlesinger, Jane Wood, David Collings, Darlene Johnson, Cinnamon Faye, Isaac Maxwell-Hunt, Roger Llewellyn, Sally George, Bill McGuirk
23 April 1995	Crazy for a Kiss	Greg Snow	Chris Bould	Clive Brill
Cast: Mike McShane
18 May 1995	The Absence of War	David Hare	Richard Eyre	Simon Curtis
Labour leader George Jones battles with his party on the campaign trail of a general election. Cast: John Thaw, Richard Pasco, Nicholas Day, Michael Bryant, Saskia Wickham, Barbara Leigh-Hunt, Clare Higgins, Paul Moriarty, George Harris, Oliver Ford Davies, Alastair Galbraith, Tyrone Huggins, Judith Coke, Martin Jarvis and Judy Damas
21 May 1995	Mrs Hartley and the Growth Centre	Philippa Gregory	Noella Smith	Debbie Shewell
Cast: Pam Ferris, Ken Christiansen, Charlotte Coleman, Constance Chapman, David Ryall, Danny Webb, Peter Blythe, Jim Carter, Gary McDonald, Emily Piercy, Kate Fenwick, Amanda Symonds, Jill Spurrier, Carol MacReady, Maeve Murphy and Jonathan Wrather
4 June 1995	Black Easter	David Pirie	Ben Bolt	Peter Goodchild
Cast: Trevor Eve, Shaun Dingwall, Bruce Myers, Murray Ewan, John Shrapnel, Peter Jordan, Amanda Ooms, Penelope Beaumont, Peter Stormare, Corinne Jaber, Josef Cervenak, Judita Hessova, Katerina Dankova, Frank Kovaks and Rudolf Pellar
11 June 1995	Bliss	Les Blair		Lynn Horsford
Cast: Douglas Hodge, Judith Scott, Saira Todd, Gary McDonald and Magnus Magnusson
=== Series Twelve ===
11 November 1995	Great Moments in Aviation	Jeanette Winterson	Beeban Kidron	Philippa Giles
Cast: Rakie Ayola, Jonathan Pryce, John Hurt, Vanessa Redgrave, Dorothy Tutin, Carmen Munroe, Oliver Samuels, David Harewood, Stan Pretty, Sol Raye, Muriel Hunte, Jeillo Edwards, Bertie Green, Willie Payne, Joan Hooley, Dora Dixon-Fyle, Marc Mathews, Alex Tetteh-Lartey, Margaret Robertson and Myleisha Powlette
18 November 1995	Priest	Jimmy McGovern	Antonia Bird	George Faber; Josephine Ward
Cast: Linus Roache, Tom Wilkinson, Robert Carlyle, Cathy Tyson, James Ellis, Lesley Sharp, Robert Pugh, Christine Tremarco, Paul Barber, Rio Fanning, Gilly Coman, Fred Pearson, Jimmy Gallagher, Tony Booth, John Bennett, Kim Johnson, Keith Cole, Bobby Martino, Valerie Lilley, Jimmy Coleman, Michael Ananins, Mickey Poppins, Adrian Luty, Bill Dean, Matyelok Gibbs, Charley Wilde, Euan Blair, Marsha Thomason, Victoria Arnold and Giuseppe Murphy
25 November 1995	Streetlife	Karl Francis		Ruth Caleb
Cast: Helen McCrory, Rhys Ifans, Donna Edwards, Ruth Lloyd, Lynwen Hobbs, Clare Isaac, Christine Tuckett, Lynn Hunter, Nicola Branson, Claire Erasmus, Jeremi Cockram, John Pierce Jones, Gary Howe, Roger Nott, Gemma Probert, Huw Davies, Richard Harrington, Teresa Hennessy, Philip Howe, Julie Higginson, Judith Humphreys, Richard Goodfield, Lowri Mae, Helen Veasey, Wynford Ellis Owen, Brinley Jenkins, Ray Gravel, Michael Forrest and Russell Gomer
2 December 1995	Nervous Energy	Howard Schuman	Jean Stewart	Ann Scott
Cast: Alfred Molina, Cal MacAninch, John McGlynn, Siobhan Redmond, Annette Crosbie, Joseph Brady, Caroline Guthrie, Robert Donovan, Gary Cady, Kal Weber, William Scott Masson, Marian McLoughlin, Mabel Aitken, Richard Good, Neil Conrich, Tony Curran, Keith Hutcheon, Francine Morgan, Isobel Raine, Sharon Hinds, Craig Smith and John Kazek
16 December 1995	Saigon Baby	Guy Hibbert	David Attwood	Josh Golding
Cast: Kerry Fox, Douglas Hodge, John Hurt, Beng Jordan, Sornchai Chatwiriyachai, Duangkhae Buaprakhon, Suvimon Sae-Eung, Hernan Robles, Helene Patarot, Santanee Sirikul, Maneerat Xu-To, Nguyen Kimtung, Betty Ponce, Sasithon Kaewdang, Manuel Manikan, Ronnie Martinez, Christopher Layog, Augusto Victa, Pham Bichthuy and Chito Fulminar
24 December 1995	The Hawk	Peter Ransley	David Hayman	Eileen Quinn; Ann Wingate
A serial killer nicknamed "the Hawk" is preying on women, and suburban wife Annie Marsh begins to suspect her husband. But her past psychiatric history means that nobody will take her seriously. Cast: Helen Mirren, George Costigan, Rosemary Leach, Melanie Hill, Owen Teale, Clive Russell, Christopher Madin, Marie Hamer, David Harewood, Pooky Quesnel, Caroline Paterson, Jayne MacKenzie, John Duttine, Nadim Sawalha, Helen Ryan and Rachel Moores
26 December 1995	The Hour of the Pig	Leslie Megahey	Leslie Megahey	David M. Thompson
Cast: Colin Firth, Ian Holm, Donald Pleasence, Amina Annabi, Nicol Williamson, Michael Gough, Harriet Walter, Jim Carter, Lysette Anthony, Justin Chadwick, Sophie Dix, Michael Cronin, Elizabeth Spriggs, Vernon Dobtcheff, Charles Dale and Roy Evans
31 December 1995	Return of the Native	Thomas Hardy (novel); Robert W Lenski	Jack Gold	Nick Gillott
Cast: Catherine Zeta Jones, Clive Owen, Joan Plowright, Ray Stevenson, Steven MacKintosh, Claire Skinner, Paul Rogers, Celia Imrie, Richard Avery, Peter Wight, Jeremy Peters, Gregg Saunders, John Boswall, William Waghorn, Matthew Owens, Britta Smith, John Breslin and Daniel Newman
18 February 1996	Half the Picture	Richard Norton-Taylor and John McGrath	Nick Kent	John McGrath
Cast: Jan Chappell, Michael Stroud, William Hoyland, Thomas Wheatley, Jeremy Clyde, Sylvia Syms, Robert East, David Robb and Michael Culver
=== Series Thirteen ===
11 May 1996	Captives	Frank Deasy	Angela Pope	David M. Thompson
Cast: Tim Roth, Julia Ormond, Keith Allen, Siobhan Redmond, Peter Capaldi, Colin Salmon, Richard Hawley, Annette Badland, Jeff Nuttall, Kenneth Cope, Mark Strong, Bill Moody, Christina Collingridge, Victoria Scarborough, Aedin Moloney, Tricia Thorns, Nathan Dambuza, Cathy Murphy, Sandra James-Young, Sharon Hines, Julian Maud, Anthony Kernan, Tony Curran, Joe Tucker, James Hooton, Steve Swinscoe, David MacCreedy, Douglas McFerran, Catherine Sanderson, Shaheen Khan, Gilbert Martin, Michael L Blair and David Hounslow
18 May 1996	A Man of No Importance	Barry Devlin	Suri Krishnamma	Jonathan Cavendish
Cast: Albert Finney, Rufus Sewell, Brenda Fricker, Tara Fitzgerald, Michael Gambon, Patrick Malahide, Anna Manahan, Joe Pilkington, Brendan Conroy, Pat Killalea, John Killalea, Pascal Perry, Joan O'Hara, Eileen Reid, David Kelly, Mick Lally, Eileen Conroy, Stuart Dunne, Joe Savino, Paudge Behan, Dylan Tighe, Enda Oates, Jimmy Keogh, Catherine Byrne, Maureen Egan, Paddy Ashe, Ingrid Craigie, Damien Kaye, Jonathan Rhys-Myers and Paul Roe
25 May 1996	The Cement Garden	Ian McEwan (novel); Andrew Birkin	Andrew Birkin	Bee Gilbert; Ene Vanaveski
Cast: Andrew Robertson, Charlotte Gainsbourg, Sinéad Cusack, Alice Coulthard, Ned Birkin, Hanns Zischler, Jochen Horst, Gareth Brown, William Hootkins, Dick Flockhart and Mike Clark
1 June 1996	Bad Boy Blues	Biyi Bandele-Thomas	Andy Wilson	Gub Neal
Cast: Clive Owen, Maynard Eziashi, Christopher Fulford, Eve Bland, James D White, Otis Munyang'iri, Nitzan Sharron, Burt Caesar, Pip Donaghy, Brian Lipson, Tunde Ona Oba, Vera Jakob, Rosemary Da Costa, Julie Smith, Georgina Ackerman, Homa Ashman and Patrick Miller
8 June 1996	The Precious Blood	Graham Reid	John Woods	Robert Cooper; Anthony Rowe
Cast: Amanda Burton, Kevin McNally, Michael Legge, Michelle Fairley, James Ellis, Margaret D'Arcy, Cara Kelly, Gavin Kennedy, Derek Halligan, Marc O'Shea, Tim Loane, Gerard Crossan, Andrew Roddy, David Calvert, Trevor Moore, Catherine Brennan, Rosemary McCauley and Catherine Higgins
15 June 1996	Century	Stephen Poliakoff		Thomas Pickard; Thérèse Pickard
Cast: Charles Dance, Clive Owen, Miranda Richardson, Robert Stephens, Joan Hickson, Lena Headey, Neil Stuke, Liza Walker, Fiona Walker, Joseph Bennett, Carlton Chance, Graham Loughridge, Alexis Daniel, Ian Shaw, Bruce Alexander, Mark Strong, Dail Sullivan, Mark Hadfield, Geoffrey Beevers, Trevor Cooper, David Barrass, David Roderick, Michael Burrell, Allie Byrne, Nicholas Gleaves, Anna Chancellor, Katherine Best and Dorothea Phillips
=== Series Fourteen ===
5 October 1996	Crossing the Floor	Guy Jenkin		Lissa Evans
Cast: Tom Wilkinson, Neil Pearson, Diana Kent, Helen Baxendale, Douglas Henshall, James Fleet, Clive Russell, Meera Syal, Jonathan Cullen, James Ellis, Rosemary Martin, Andy Hamilton, Paula Jacobs, Geoffrey Whitehead, Julian Fellowes, Norman Bird and Mark Benton
12 October 1996	Deadly Voyage	Stuart Urban	John MacKenzie	Bradley Adams; John Goldschmidt
Cast: Omar Epps, Joss Ackland, Sean Pertwee, David Suchet, Andrew Divoff, Jean-Claude La Marre, Ade Wale, Ilia Volok, Roman Varshavsky, Chiwetel Ejiofor, Eugene Shaw, Henry Nartey, Oscar Provencal, Wakefield Ackuaku, David Dontoh, Maxine Burth, Michael Byrne, Ravil Isyanov, Tomas Lukes and Zillah Yeo
19 October 1996	Loving	Henry Green (novel); Maggie Wadey	Diarmuid Lawrence	Louis Marks
Cast: Mark Rylance, Georgina Cates, Sara Stephens, Danny Dyer, Gabrielle Lloyd, Carol MacReady, Max Brazier, Perdita Weeks, Charlotte Curley, Lucy Cohu, Judy Parfitt, Phyllis Ryan, Brian McGuinness, Owen Roe, Peadar Lamb, Michael James Ford and Ruth Comiskey
26 October 1996	Flowers of the Forest	Michael Eaton	Michael Whyte	Norman McCandlish
Cast: Lia Williams, Pauline Collins, Annette Crosbie, Patricia Kerrigan, Kelly MacDonald, Clive Russell, Susan Vidler, Barbara Peirson, Garrick Hagon, Gordon McCorkell, Lyndsay Henderson, Molly Weir, Janette Foggo, Lesley Mackie, Gary Lewis, John Buick, Patricia Ross, Sophie Scott, Gareth White, David Gallacher, Ronald Simon, Mary Waters and Philip Carroll
2 November 1996	Look Me in the Eye	Nick Ward		Simon Relph
Cast: Caroline Catz, Seamus Gibbins, Barnaby Stone, Joseph Long, Paloma Baeza, Rachel Inman, Reece Baani, Alice Mathews, Pia Mathews, Chattie Salaman, Matt Patresi, Daniel Brewer, Kelly Hunter, Katrin Cartlidge, Edward Atterton, Alan Cooke, Titus Forbes-Adam, John Sandford, Peter Tate, Khaki, Sandra Voe, Christopher Simon, Matthew Scurfield and Tom Faber
16 November 1996	Dallas Doll	Ann Turner		Ray Brown; Penny Chapman
Cast: Sandra Bernhard, Victoria Longley, Frank Gallacher, Jake Blundell, Rose Byrne, Jonathan Leahy, Douglas Hedge, Melissa Thomas, Elaine Lee, Alethea McGrath, John Frawley, Roy Bilung, Laura Bentley, Sally Cahill, Hannah O'Brien, John Hinde, Roseann McDonald, Beatrice Remy, Eva Dicesare, William Usic, Walter Sullivan, Luke Carroll, Alan Campbell, David Ngoombujarra, Ken Senga, Kuni Hashimoto, Bob Lovett, Margie McCrae, Roy Billing, Celia Ireland
31 December 1996	Burn Your Phone	Andrew Wallace	Alan Cumming	Dixie Linder
Cast: Alan Cumming, Jason Isaacs, Burt Caesar, Trevor Cooper, Ian Dunn, Beverley Hills and Anthony Jackson
=== Series Fifteen ===
17 May 1997	Stonewall	Rikki Beadle-Blair; Martin Duberman (book)	Nigel Finch	Christine Vachon
A young gay man arrives in New York in the summer of 1969. Cast: Guillermo Diaz, Frederick Weller, Brendan Corbalis, Duane Boutte, Bruce MacVittie, Peter Ratray, Dwight Ewell, Matthew Faber, Michael McElroy, Luis Guzman, Joey Dedio, Candis Cayne, David Drumgold, Keith Levy, Fenton Lawless, Margaret Gibson, Vincent Capone, Jose Zuniga and Emanuel Xuereb
1 June 1997	ID	Vincent O'Connell; James Bannon (story)	Philip Davis	Sally Hibbin
Cast: Reece Dinsdale, Richard Graham, Claire Skinner, Sean Pertwee, Saskia Reeves, Warren Clarke, Philip Glenister, Perry Fenwick, Charles De'Ath, Lee Ross, Ian Redford, Phil Davis, Frank Coda and Thomas Craig
7 June 1997	Stone, Scissors, Paper	Richard Cameron	Stephen Whittaker	Laurence Bowen; Sally French
Cast: Juliet Stevenson, Ken Stott, Melanie Kilburn, John Bowler, Ian Redford, Ian Dunn, Katherine Dow Blyton, Hazel Douglas, David Kay, Keith Humphries, Joanna Knowles, Justin Ellery and Hope Johnstone
14 June 1997	Butterfly Kiss	Frank Cottrell Boyce	Michael Winterbottom	Julie Baines; Sarah Daniel
Cast: Amanda Plummer, Saskia Reeves, Ricky Tomlinson, Des McAleer, Paul Bown, Freda Dowie, Fine Time Fontayne, Kathy Jameson, Lisa Jane Riley, Paula Tilbrook, Joanne Cook, Emily Aston and Katy Murphy
21 June 1997	Brothers in Trouble	Robert Buckler; Abdullah Hussein (story)	Udayan Prasad	Robert Buckler
Cast: Om Puri, Angeline Ball, Pavan Malhotra, Pravesh Kumar, Ahsen Bhatti, Bhasker Patel, William Maxwell
28 December 1997	Mothertime	Matthew Jacobs; Gillian White (novel)	Matthew Jacobs	Josh Golding
Cast: Kate Maberly, Gina McKee, Anthony Andrews, Imogen Stubbs, Zohren Weiss, Rosy de Wolf, Megan de Wolf, Felix Bell, Ian Reddington, Faith Brook, Sheila Allen, Rosalind Bennett, Stephanie Fayerman, Georgie Glen, Sarah-Marie Maltha, Kevin Dyer and Fenella Shepherd
1 January 1998	Small Faces	Billy MacKinnon; Gillies MacKinnon	Gillies MacKinnon	Steve Clark-Hall
Cast: Iain Robertson, Joseph McFadden, J.S. Duffy, Laura Fraser, Garry Sweeney, Clare Higgins, Kevin McKidd, Mark McConnochie, Steven Singleton and David Walker
21 June 1998	The Tribe	Stephen Poliakoff		Anita Overland
Cast: Joely Richardson, Anna Friel, Jeremy Northam, Trevor Eve, Laura Fraser, Jonathan Rhys-Myers, Sean Francis, Stephanie Buttle, George Costigan, Lynne Miller, Emma Amos, Rene Lawrence, Michael Feast, Julian Rhind-Tutt, Kate Isitt, Rupert Penry-Jones and Frank Mills
