= The Captives =

The Captives may refer to:

- Captivi, a Latin play by the early Roman playwright Titus Maccius Plautus
- The Captives (1724 play), a 1724 work by the British writer John Gay
- The Captives (Delap play), 1786 work by the British writer John Delap
- The Captives (film), a 2004 American film

== See also ==
- Captives, a 1994 British romantic crime drama
