= Coylet =

Coordinates: 56.054408°N 4.9836236°W

Coylet: Scottish Gaelic: Cuingleathad
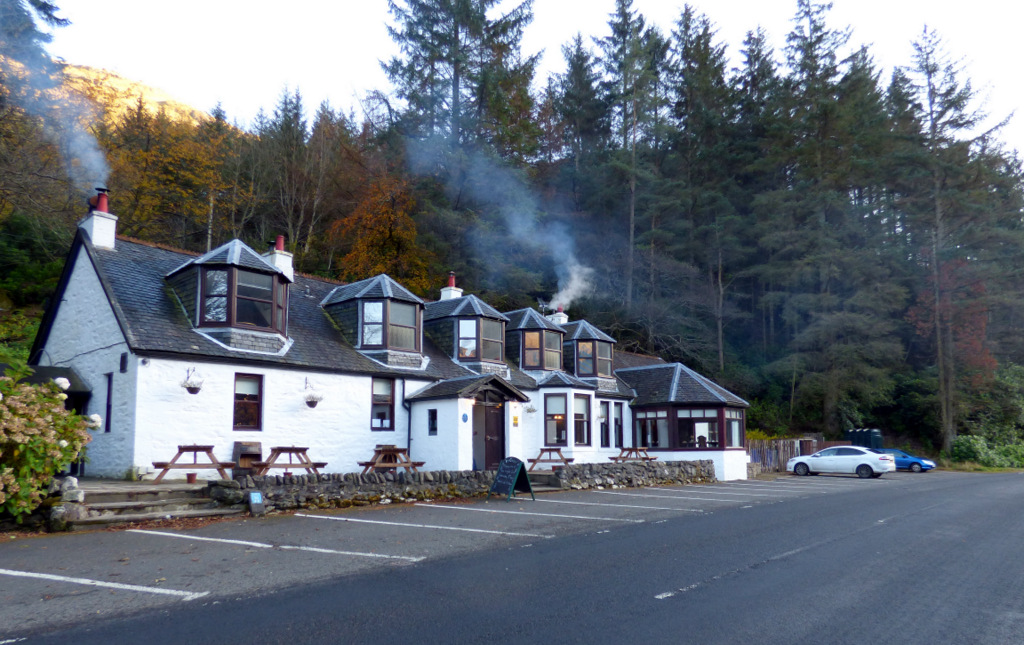
- Coylet Inn

- Location within Argyll and Bute
- OS grid reference: NS 14304 88632
- Council area: Argyll and Bute
- Lieutenancy area: Argyll and Bute
- Country: Scotland
- Sovereign state: United Kingdom
- Post town: DUNOON, ARGYLL
- Postcode district: PA23
- Dialling code: 01369
- UK Parliament: Argyll, Bute and South Lochaber
- Scottish Parliament: Argyll and Bute

Coylet is a hamlet centred around the Coylet Inn beside Loch Eck, on the Cowal Peninsula, in Argyll and Bute, Scotland.

The hamlet is within the Argyll Forest Park, which is itself within the Loch Lomond and The Trossachs National Park. It developed around the Coylet Inn, a coaching inn established in the 1650s located on the A815 road that leads to Dunoon, the main town on the peninsula.

The name may be derived from Gaelic caol ait, "narrow place".

== Popular culture ==
The 1994 film The Blue Boy is centred around the story of a four-year-old boy drowning in Loch Eck and haunting the Coylet Inn. It was filmed on location at the inn. Starring Emma Thompson and Adrian Dunbar, directed by Paul Murton.

== Gallery ==
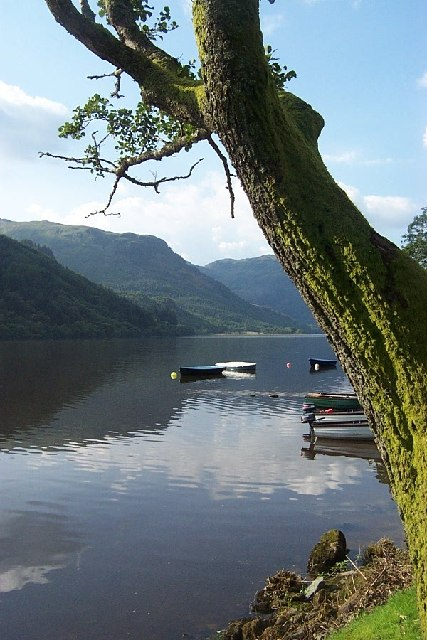
View from Coylet Inn

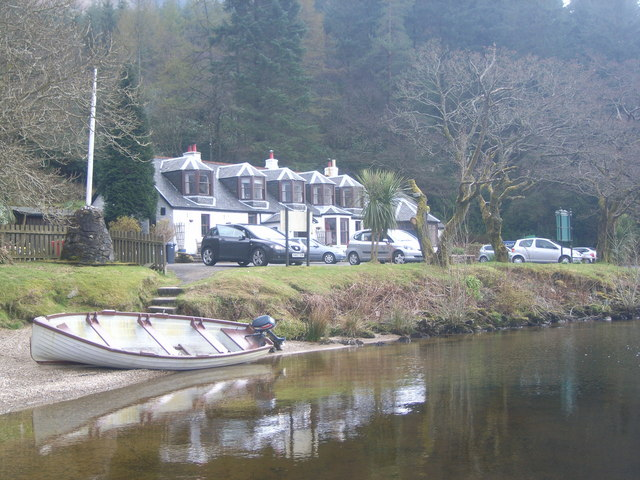
Looking ashore from Loch Eck

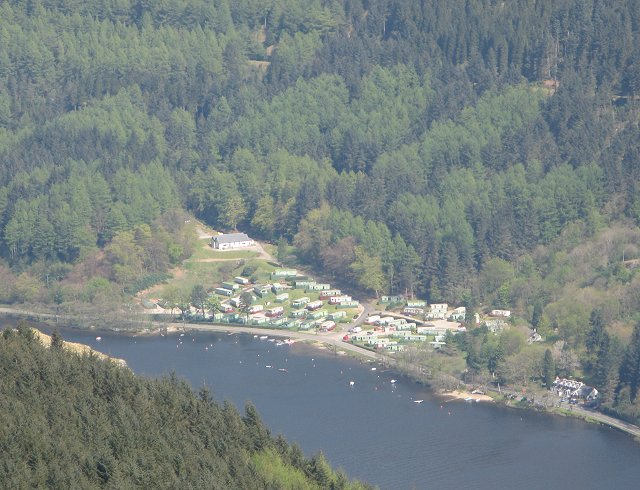
Aerial view of Coylet
