= List of Kingdom (British TV series) episodes =

This is a list of episodes of the British television series Kingdom. The first series aired on ITV in 2007, the second in 2008. The third series was aired in 2009. As of the end of Series 3, 18 episodes have been broadcast.

== Episodes ==
=== Series overview ===
Series	Episodes	Originally released	
Series	Episodes	First released	Last released
1	6	22 April 2007	27 May 2007
2	6	13 January 2008	17 February 2008
3	6	7 June 2009	12 July 2009

=== Series 1 (2007) ===
No.	Title	Directed by	Written by	Original release date	UK viewers (millions)
1	"Episode 1"	Robin Sheppard	Alan Whiting	22 April 2007	8.55
Peter Kingdom is slowly getting his life back on track after the disappearance of his half-brother at sea six months earlier, but normality is upset when his half sister Beatrice moves into his spare room after a spell in rehab. Peter looks into two cases; in one, two sons have returned for the execution of their mother's estate, and in the other, local man Sidney Snell wants to bring action against the local planning authority. As Peter sits down with a drink at the end of the episode, Simon's phone rings.
2	"Episode 2"	Robin Sheppard	Alan Whiting	29 April 2007	7.05
A woman arrives at the offices claiming her ex-employer has stolen her baby. Beatrice causes mayhem by shredding documents and sticking labels to everything. Peter has the call to Simon's phone traced, learning that it came from an anonymous international number. He has a heart-to-heart with Auriel as the locals prepare for the 127th annual Dyke Leaping Championships. Peter discovers Simon's driving licence is in the name of "Christopher Waller", a deceased client.
3	"Episode 3"	Metin Hüseyin	Jeff Povey	6 May 2007	5.44
A father and his son come to Peter after their insurers refuse to pay when their fishing boat is destroyed in an explosion. Lyle investigates further, discovering that the father once served a prison sentence for insurance fraud. Beatrice meets a local artist, Alan, and joins his life class as the model. The council takes revenge on Snell after his many small plots of land prevent them from building anything. Peter meets Christopher Waller's parents when he finds out that Simon's bank account has been regularly paying out to them.
4	"Episode 4"	Metin Hüseyin	Alan Whiting	13 May 2007	5.89
A girl's parents retain Peter to sue Cambridge University because she has not been offered a place. Peter visits his old tutor to investigate and learns that Simon contacted him for money shortly before he disappeared. Gloria is upset because it is a year since her husband died, and her son is picked up by the police for breaking windows in the town. Lyle assists Snell in a scheme to stop the gas company building on a piece of local grazing land. Beatrice uses Lyle to win back Alan, but on discovering that Alan has again been cheating on his sister Peter confronts him.
5	"Episode 5"	Sandy Johnson	Jeff Povey	20 May 2007	6.31
Peter takes on the case of a woman who wants to divorce her husband after discovering his transvestism, while Lyle agrees to represent a horse owner against Romany travellers, only to later take the travellers' side. During a lucid spell, Beatrice confronts Peter to find out what he knows about Simon's disappearance. A windfall allows Peter to pay off Simon's gambling debts, but upon doing so he is told that this will not be the end of the matter.
6	"Episode 6"	Sandy Johnson	Alan Whiting	27 May 2007	6.28
Peter learns Lyle intends to take a city job and hands him the case of an Auschwitz survivor who has received multiple eviction notices from the council. The man's story emotionally drains Lyle and when the eviction order is dropped he decides to stay. Beatrice decides to "bond" with Gloria as Peter meets the Wallers again and later discovers that someone else tried to pay off Simon's debts. Honor, a pregnant woman, arrives at the office, revealing Simon is the father, and that it happened after his supposed death. Beatrice joins Peter on Simon's beach.

=== Series 2 (2008) ===
No.	Title	Directed by	Written by	Original release date	UK viewers (millions)
7	"Episode 1"	Andrew Grieve	Alan Whiting	13 January 2008	5.80
The story picks up about a year after the first series. Two sisters whose dog has been injured in a cliff-path fall consult Peter about suing the council. The Women's Institute enlists Peter's assistance to save a lighthouse which is threatened with demolition. Honor and her baby are now living at Peter's where Honor gives music lessons. Peter and Beatrice interrupt Honor and Lyle sharing a kiss, after which Honor fears that she has ruined things as Lyle avoids her. He, meanwhile, is embroiled in a feud between two burger-van owning brothers who battle one another from lay-bys on opposite sides of the same stretch of road. Beatrice discovers that she is pregnant. When she and Peter return home they find Simon waiting there.
8	"Episode 2"	Andrew Grieve	John Moloney	20 January 2008	6.16
Simon is reunited with Honor and is introduced to baby Daniel. It is clear that Simon is up to no good, as it is revealed that he is secretly hiding hundreds of thousands of pounds in cash in the Kingdom offices. Meanwhile, Peter must keep his brother hidden from the gossiping locals and DC Yelland. Auriel draws Peter's attention to Mr Wright, a resident at her retirement home, whose relationship with his much younger nurse Heather has caused a fall-out between him and his daughter. Mr Wright's daughter suspects Heather is only with her ill father to collect his fortune upon his death. Beatrice announces that she is leaving Market Shipborough until the baby is born. Simon's cover is blown when Yelland arrives at the Kingdom offices and he is arrested.
9	"Episode 3"	Andrew Grieve	Jeff Povey	27 January 2008	5.41
The magistrates set Simon's bail at £100,000. Simon is not worried and expects his brother to go as far as mortgaging Kingdom and Kingdom to raise the money. Peter and Lyle investigate a nearby USAF base after a woman asks Peter to inform a pilot there that he is the father of her unborn child. The Americans at the airbase claim to have never heard of the man, and Peter investigates further. After a talk with Lyle, Honor leaves Market Shipborough. Lyle discovers some of Simon's hidden money, and pays his bail.
10	"Episode 4"	Edward Hall	Alan Whiting	3 February 2008	5.23
Simon returns to work at the Kingdom & Kingdom offices, and Peter investigates cricket captain Nigel Pearson (played by John Thomson), who appears to be refusing to honour sponsorship contracts made with local companies. Simon, meanwhile, proceeds to have an affair with Pearson's wife. Lyle represents Henny a local activist (played by Miriam Margolyes).
11	"Episode 5"	Edward Hall	Guy Burt	10 February 2008	5.65
Peter is invited by his old Cambridge professor, Barkway, to speak at a college conference. Barkway is also trying to recover some stolen research by a recently deceased college biologist and Peter and Simon agree to help, but Barkway hasn't told them the whole truth. Back in Market Shipborough, Lyle is in charge of business with the help of Gloria's son Scott. Lyle is trying to buy a G-Wiz car from a local car salesman, Mr Matthews, whose son Dave is trying to buy a house with his girlfriend. Matthews offers his son the money, but Dave refuses, as he knows the only way he will be able to pay his father back is by agreeing to work for him for the rest of his life, and Dave has dreams of his own. Lyle offers legal advice and tries to keep the peace between father and son.
12	"Episode 6"	Edward Hall	Alan Whiting	17 February 2008	5.69
The residents at Auriel's home put on a performance of Shakespearean play The Tempest (with Lyle as Miranda) just as a storm hits Market Shipborough. Simon plans to run away from the mob that is hunting him down, and reveals to Peter that the money hidden in Kingdom & Kingdom is their father's. Simon then drives off in the rain, but after the storm, Peter discovers his body on the beach.

=== Series 3 (2009) ===
Metin Hüseyin and Edward Hall return to direct Series 3. The episodes were written by Alan Whiting, Jeff Povey and Guy Burt.

No.	Title	Directed by	Written by	Original release date	UK viewers (millions)
13	"Episode 1"	Metin Hüseyin	Alan Whiting	7 June 2009	5.32
Lyle represents a woman (Sophie Winkleman) who brings a sex discrimination case against the Blues and Royals, while Peter helps a soldier from the same regiment who lost a leg in Iraq get better compensation from the Ministry of Defence. Gloria's elderly father (Peter Sallis) causes trouble with an elderly mother (June Whitfield) and her adult son, who want to take their canal boat through his lock.
14	"Episode 2"	Metin Hüseyin	Guy Burt	14 June 2009	4.70
A farmer (Sandi Toksvig) seeks Peter's help when she suspects vandals of creating crop circles in her fields. When she plans to harvest the wheat, Terry, a hot air balloonist, asks Peter to stop her, as he believes that the crop circles are real, much to the annoyance of his son, Dan, who's falling behind at school. During a stakeout in the field, they encounter a man dressed as Tom Baker's Doctor Who. When Dan informs Peter that Terry's been hearing voices, he confronts him and tells him to let him know when they next make contact. When Dan confesses that he was the one who made crop circles as a cry for help, Peter works out that the culprits behind Terry's voices were a rival quiz team. Meanwhile, Lyle has a professional crisis of confidence when he encounters an attractive paralegal named Emily when he helps the Dodds family fight off a compulsory purchase order from the council on behalf of their uptight daughter.
15	"Episode 3"	Metin Hüseyin	Jeff Povey	21 June 2009	4.76
Beatrice sets up a phone sex line to help pay for her daughter Petra's school fees, and is horrified when Petra's father phones. Nigel Pearson seeks Lyle's help when a group of nuns are evicted from their convent. Peter helps out with a feud between a medical researcher and her daughter.
16	"Episode 4"	Edward Hall	Guy Burt	28 June 2009	5.10
Peter reluctantly helps Jeremy (Jack Dee), a judge who receives incriminating photos of him and a mystery woman. When Beatrice sees him, she reveals to Peter that she spent an evening with him and that he is Petra's father. When Jeremy shows Peter his latest ransom note, Jeremy's mother informs him that Shirley, his wife, is coming to visit. Beatrice and Peter follow a lead that brings them to the woman in the photos, who reveals she was hired by a woman to seduce Jeremy. This turns out to be his mother, who catches Jeremy and Beatrice meeting to talk about their daughter. Lyle becomes involved in a land dispute on a golf course, apparently built on ley lines, when war breaks out between Druids and golfers. During the case, Lyle discovers a mistake made in where these ley lines were drawn, neatly resolving the dispute. However, during a date arranged by the druids with Emily, Lyle's Mum appears from nowhere and joins them.
17	"Episode 5"	Edward Hall	Alan Whiting	5 July 2009	4.94
Lyle travels to Stockport when his mother asks for help to stop some houses being built on local allotments. Around the same time, Lyle's twin brothers, Callum and Finlay, are arrested for guerrilla gardening, and a high-speed car chase follows. Gloria's son Scott accuses DC Yelland of using CCTV to spy on young people who wear hoodies, and Peter represents the parents of a young cellist who have been refused permission to video-tape her performance for Young Musician of the Year. As the episode nears an end, Lyle, Callum and Finlay discover a native and endangered plant that can stop the council from building houses on the local allotments. When the town is celebrating, Lyle and the twins come to an agreement: Lyle will represent them if they stay out of trouble. At the end of the episode, Peter appears ill and collapses.
18	"Episode 6"	Edward Hall	Alan Whiting	12 July 2009	5.14
Peter helps a local aristocrat who thinks that his brother is using drugs, while Lyle investigates a poisoned river. With his blackouts continuing, Peter visits a doctor for some tests and discovers that he has diabetes. The tests also reveal that Peter is not a blood relation of Beatrice. Aunt Auriel reveals that Beatrice and Simon's father was not Peter's father.
