= See You Friday =

- Genre: Comedy-drama; Sitcom
- Written by: Alan Whiting
- Directed by: Simon Massey
- Starring: Neil Pearson; Joanna Roth; Mark Benton; Hugh Bonneville; Hermione Norris; Denise Welch; Charlie Hardwick; Daisy Bates; Neil Armstrong; Trevor Fox
- Country of origin: United Kingdom
- Original language: English
- No. of series: 1
- No. of episodes: 6

Production
- Executive producer: David Reynolds
- Producer: Elizabeth Lizzie Taylor
- Running time: 30 minutes
- Production company: Yorkshire Television

Original release
- Network: ITV
- Release: 9 May – 13 June 1997

See You Friday is a British comedy-drama made by Yorkshire Television. It ran for one series on ITV from 9 May to 13 June 1997. It was written by Alan Whiting and directed by Simon Massey.

Greg (Neil Pearson) and Lucy (Joanna Roth) meet on the final night of their separate holidays in Greece. They want to see one another again, but he lives in Newcastle upon Tyne and she is based in London. Over the coming weeks, they attempt to maintain a long-distance romance. The series also featured Mark Benton, Hugh Bonneville, Hermione Norris, Denise Welch and Charlie Hardwick in supporting roles.

== Episodes ==
- Episode One (9 May 1997)
- Episode Two (16 May 1997)

Anxious to see Lucy again, Greg drives the 300 miles to London. She is delighted to see him, but as they get to know one another she is surprised to find out that he has been married before.

- Episode Three (23 May 1997)

Lucy travels north to Newcastle upon Tyne, where Greg's sister is organising a dinner party.

- Episode Four (30 May 1997)

Greg has to cancel a planned trip to London, as he has to go to a friend's birthday party. Lucy agrees to travel to Newcastle upon Tyne, but her car breaks down en route.

- Episode Five (6 June 1997)

Greg meets Lucy on the train from London, to take her for a romantic weekend at a hotel. The couple want to move in together, but neither is prepared to uproot.

- Episode Six (13 June 1997)

Lucy travels north to attend Greg's sister's wedding. When she finds a ring in his pocket, she supposes that he plans to propose. A car journey with Greg's ex-wife proves troublesome.
