= Angela Pope =

British director

- Born: 1945 (age 80–81); Walton-on-Thames, Surrey, U.K.
- Occupation: Film director

Angela Pope (born in 1945) is a British television and film director, documentarian, producer and screenwriter.

== Life and career ==
Born in Walton-on-Thames, Pope graduated in political sciences at the University of Sussex. She started her career as a documentarist for BBC, getting critical acclaim as well as raising controversies with Yesterday's Men (1971), which portrayed some members of the Wilson Cabinet in the aftermath of the Labour Party defeat at 1970 United Kingdom general election. After numerous documentaries, including the controversial The Best Days? (1977), which criticized the comprehensive school system using the Faraday High School in Ealing as case study, she made her narrative film debut in 1986 with the television film Night Shift, based on her own play.

In 1987 Pope got critical acclaim with the Screen Two AIDS-themed television film Sweet As You Are, starring Liam Neeson and Miranda Richardson, which was awarded best film from the Royal Television Society. Her feature film debut Captives premiered out of competition at the 1994 edition of the Venice Film Festival, and was followed two years later by the family drama Hollow Reed.
