= Zoe Cooper =

British playwright

- Born: 1984 (age 41–42); Stockport, England
- Occupation: Playwright
- Known for: Jess and Joe Forever, Out of Water
- Parent(s): Robert Cooper; Jenny Howe

Zoe Cooper (born 1984) is a British playwright whose work has been produced by major UK theatre companies including the Royal Shakespeare Company, National Theatre, Northern Stage and Leeds Playhouse. In 2024, she was appointed Writer-in-Residence at the Royal Shakespeare Company.

== Early life and education ==
Cooper was born in 1984 and her birth was registered in Stockport, England. She is the daughter of television producer Robert Cooper and the actress Jenny Howe, known for her role as Mrs Keele in Grange Hill.

She grew up in Twickenham, London, and has described her upbringing as shaping her interest in writing about ordinary lives and relationships. She studied English literature at the University of Cambridge before completing an MPhil in playwriting at the University of Birmingham and a PhD in creative writing at Newcastle University.

== Career ==
Cooper's early work as a playwright included plays such as Nativities and Petrification, which explored contemporary relationships and everyday experiences. Her breakthrough came with Jess and Joe Forever, a play examining friendship and intimacy, which received the 2016 Offie for Most Promising Playwright and brought her wider recognition.

She subsequently developed Out of Water, which was shortlisted for the Susan Smith Blackburn Prize, further establishing her reputation as a playwright of contemporary drama.

Alongside her writing, Cooper has worked in dramaturgy and literary management and has taught playwriting at Newcastle University. Her work often focuses on personal relationships, identity and the complexities of modern life, drawing on her own experiences and observations.

In 2024, she was appointed Writer-in-Residence at the Royal Shakespeare Company, a role supporting the development of new writing for the stage. In the same year, Cooper's version of Northanger Abbey, inspired by the Austen novel, opened at the Orange Tree Theatre and toured to Bolton Octagon, TBTL and SJT, and her adaptation of David Almond’s novel A Song For Ella Grey opened at Northern Stage, before also touring.

== Personal life ==
Cooper is based in Newcastle upon Tyne. She has described herself as a queer woman.
