= Truly, Madly, Deeply (film) =

- Reproduction poster
- Directed by: Anthony Minghella
- Written by: Anthony Minghella
- Produced by: Robert Cooper
- Starring: Juliet Stevenson; Alan Rickman; Bill Paterson; Michael Maloney
- Cinematography: Remi Adefarasin
- Edited by: John Stothart
- Music by: Barrington Pheloung
- Production companies: BBC Films; Lionheart; Winston
- Distributed by: The Samuel Goldwyn Company
- Release dates: 10 November 1990 (London Film Festival); 3 May 1991 (US); 16 August 1991 (UK)
- Running time: 106 minutes
- Country: United Kingdom
- Language: English
- Budget: £0.75 million
- Box office: £1.5 million (UK/US)

Truly, Madly, Deeply is a 1990 British fantasy drama film made for the BBC's Screen Two series, by BBC Films, Lionheart and Winston Pictures. The film, written and directed by Anthony Minghella, stars Juliet Stevenson and Alan Rickman.

== Plot ==
Nina, an interpreter, is beside herself with grief at the recent death of her boyfriend, Jamie, a cellist. When she is on the verge of despair, Jamie reappears as a ghost and the couple are reunited. Nina is ecstatic.

Jamie tells her about his days while she is at work, and one dialogue suggests she should embrace the life around her; one of these is about a memorial plaque in a park about a dead child, and how parents who read it feel an immediate, compelling need to hug their children.

Jamie reminds her that he also irritated her, and as a ghost he manifests behaviours she has little patience for – turning up the central heating to stifling levels, moving furniture around and inviting back "ghost friends" to watch videos. This infuriates her, and their relationship deteriorates.

She meets Mark, a psychologist to whom she is attracted, but she is unwilling to become involved with him because of Jamie's continued presence. Nina continues to love Jamie, but is conflicted by his self-centered behaviour and ultimately wonders out loud, "Was it always like this?" Over Nina's objections, Jamie decides to leave to allow her to move on.

Towards the end of the film, Jamie watches Nina leave and one of his fellow ghosts asks, "Well?" and Jamie responds, "I think so ... Yes." At this point the central conceit of the movie has become clear: Jamie came back specifically to help Nina get over him by tarnishing her idealized memory of him.

== Cast ==
- Juliet Stevenson as Nina
- Alan Rickman as Jamie
- Jenny Howe as Burge
- Carolyn Choa as Translator
- Bill Paterson as Sandy
- Christopher Rozycki as Titus
- Keith Bartlett as Plumber
- David Ryall as George
- Stella Maris as Maura
- Ian Hawkes as Harry
- Deborah Findlay as Claire
- Vania Vilers as Frenchman
- Arturo Venegas as Roberto
- Richard Syms as Symonds
- Michael Maloney as Mark

== Production ==
Minghella said he wrote the script specifically as "a vehicle for [Stevenson] to express all her talents. She plays piano, likes dancing and has a quirky side to her which she usually can't express in the classical parts she is asked for." The title comes from a word game played by the main characters, in which they challenge each other in turns to repeat and add to a series of adverbs describing the depths of their mutual affection. The working title for the film was Cello, a reference not only to the instrument within the film, but also to the Italian word for heaven, cielo. The film was made-for-TV, and produced in a 28-day shooting schedule for just $650,000.

It was shot on location in London and Bristol, with external shots in Highgate and on the South Bank. Stevenson said in 2012 that it was the favourite role of her career, commenting that the shoot was like a party.

== Release and reception ==
The film had its world premiere on 10 November 1990 at the National Film Theatre as part of the London Film Festival with the title Cello.

=== Critical response ===
The film was critically successful, winning several awards including a BAFTA for best original screenplay for Anthony Minghella, while Alan Rickman and Juliet Stevenson earned Best Actor and Best Actress nominations. Rickman, Stevenson and Minghella all won awards at the 1991 Evening Standard British Film Awards.

It became a hit in the American arthouse circuit and Minghella subsequently was offered work by every major studio in Hollywood. The film's combination of serious themes with comic scenes, music and strong performances from the actors was noted by critics. Roger Ebert called it "a Ghost for grownups" (a common comparison because of the shared theme of lovers returning as ghosts and the concurrent releases of the films) and considered the film to reveal "some truths that are, the more you think about them, really pretty profound".

Review aggregator Rotten Tomatoes reports a 76% approval rating based on 38 reviews. The website's critics consensus reads: "Largely thanks to charming performances from Alan Rickman and Juliet Stevenson, Truly Madly Deeply is an afterlife romance with infectious spirit." At Metacritic, the film has a weighted mean score of 72 out of 100 based on 16 reviews.

=== Box office ===
The film grossed $£603,000 in the United Kingdom and $1,554,742 in the United States and Canada.

=== Awards and nominations ===
Year	Award	Category	Nominated work	Result
1992	British Academy Film Awards	Best Actor	Alan Rickman	Nominated
1992	British Academy Film Awards	Best Actress	Juliet Stevenson	Nominated
1992	British Academy Film Awards	Best Original Screenplay	Anthony Minghella	Won
1992	Evening Standard British Film Awards	Best Actor	Alan Rickman	Won
1992	Evening Standard British Film Awards	Best Actress	Juliet Stevenson	Won
1992	Evening Standard British Film Awards	Most Promising Newcomer	Anthony Minghella	Won
1992	London Film Critics' Circle	Best Actor of the Year	Alan Rickman	Won
1992	London Film Critics' Circle	Best Actress of the Year	Juliet Stevenson	Won
1991	New York Film Critics Circle	Best New Director	Anthony Minghella	Nominated
1991	New York Film Critics Circle	Best Actress	Juliet Stevenson	Nominated

== See also ==
- List of ghost films
- Kiss Me Goodbye
- Over Her Dead Body
