= Kingdom (British TV series) =

British television comedy drama series (2007–2009)

- Genre: Comedy drama
- Created by: Simon Wheeler; Alan Whiting (co-creator)
- Starring: Stephen Fry; Hermione Norris; Celia Imrie; Karl Davies; Tony Slattery; Phyllida Law; John Thomson; Dominic Mafham
- Composer: Mark Russell
- Country of origin: United Kingdom
- Original language: English
- No. of series: 3
- No. of episodes: 18 (list of episodes)

Production
- Executive producers: Simon Wheeler; Stephen Fry; Alan Moloney; Gina Carter
- Producer: Georgina Lowe
- Running time: 46 minutes
- Production companies: Parallel Film and Television; Sprout Productions; Ingenious Broadcasting

Original release
- Network: ITV
- Release: 22 April 2007 – 12 July 2009

Kingdom is a British television series produced by Parallel Film and Television Productions for the ITV network. It was created by Simon Wheeler and stars Stephen Fry as Peter Kingdom, a Norfolk solicitor who is coping with family, colleagues, and the strange locals who come to him for legal assistance. The series also starred Hermione Norris, Celia Imrie, Karl Davies, Phyllida Law and Tony Slattery.

The first series of six one-hour episodes was aired in 2007 and averaged six million viewers per week. Despite a mid-series ratings dip, the executive chairman of ITV praised the programme and ordered a second series, which was filmed in 2007 and broadcast in January and February 2008. Filming on the third series ran from July to September 2008 for broadcast from 7 June 2009.

In October 2009, ITV announced it was cancelling the series; the channel said that, given tighter budgets, more expensive productions were being cut.

== Series synopses ==
The series follows Peter Kingdom, a small-town solicitor whose work revolves around cases brought by the eclectic and eccentric populace of Market Shipborough. The series retains a largely episodic format, where self-contained plots play out before the hour concludes, though a continuing storyline concerns the mysterious disappearance of Simon Kingdom, Peter's half-brother. The first episode reveals that he vanished at sea six months previously and that everybody who knew him (including Peter) assumed that he committed suicide. Each week there are further indications that he did not die, culminating in episode six when it is revealed that he had a relationship with a woman who become pregnant with his child after he had supposedly died. In the first series we are also introduced to Peter's half-sister, Beatrice, who slowly becomes an integral character in the series.

Simon returns in the second series and is charged with faking his own death. He is released from custody after Lyle, the trainee solicitor in Peter's practice, decides to use Simon's own money (possibly obtained illegally by Simon) to bail him, after Simon reveals he was actually attempting suicide. Beatrice learns that she is pregnant and she leaves Market Shipborough, until the baby is born in the last episode of the series. Lyle threatens to leave Kingdom & Kingdom when his mentor Peter neglects him, but he changes his mind when Peter makes him a partner. In the final episode, a torrential storm hits Market Shipborough, flooding much of the town. While searching for his brother, who drove off the previous night, Peter encounters something unseen by the audience, which is revealed to be Simon's dead body in Series 3.

Series 3 focuses more on Peter's life, Beatrice and her new baby (Petra), Lyle, and Gloria, the receptionist. Toward the end of the series Peter begins to suffer from small blackouts. He has some minor tests done to find out the cause of the problem. It is revealed in the last episode that Peter has Type 2 diabetes. When Peter asks the doctor whether he should tell Beatrice and Petra to get checked out, the doctor revealed that diabetes isn't the only thing they discovered. In the final scenes Peter reveals that he has found out that he has no blood relation to Beatrice or Simon, and that therefore "their" father was not in fact his father.

== Characters ==
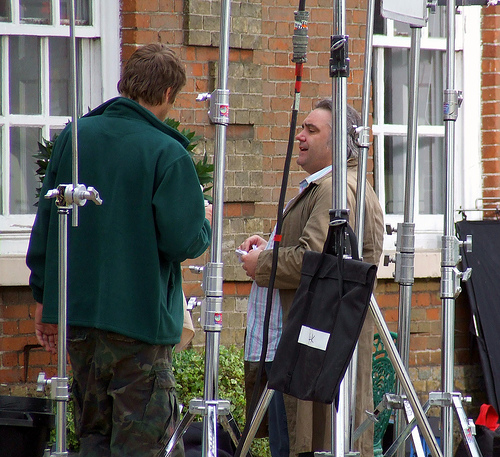
Tony Slattery (right) as Sidney Snell during filming of the second series in 2007. To emphasise the character's unkempt nature, his costume is rarely changed.

The characters are described by Wheeler as "three families"; Peter's relations, his colleagues, and the populace of Market Shipborough.

- Peter Kingdom (played by Stephen Fry) is a Cambridge-educated solicitor and one half of Kingdom & Kingdom, a law firm he ran with his father. Peter is respected and regarded as compassionate by the local community. Fry describes him as "kind and empathetic", "on the side of the ordinary people" and as being "lonely and isolated" and not revealing his true emotions. Phyllida Law describes Peter as "into the community like one of those old French village priests".
- Beatrice Kingdom (played by Hermione Norris) is Peter's half-sister, who arrives in the first episode after leaving rehabilitation. She is described by Wheeler as intended to be the "ultimate annoying little sister". By series two, she is successfully controlling her mental illness with medication and has become more responsible and reliable. Norris's second pregnancy (with her daughter, Hero) was worked into the series storyline; Beatrice is portrayed as promiscuous in the first series and takes several pregnancy tests in the second series, which all come up positive. Beatrice goes into labour in episode five of the second series and asks Simon to be present at the birth. The identity of Petra's father is initially not known, and Simon tells Peter he "will totally flip" when he finds out. It is later revealed her father is a local philandering judge. Petra is played by twin girls in the third series. Their mother answered a casting call for young twins in a local newspaper.
- Lyle Anderson (played by Karl Davies) is a trainee solicitor at Kingdom & Kingdom during the first series. At the end of the second series, he qualifies, and is offered and accepts a partnership in the practice. Lyle is a somewhat comic character often having bad luck, whether he misses out on a potential relationship or gets hit by a golf ball. The writers created a running joke for the character, where he gets injured in almost every episode, from falling in swimming pools, landing in dikes, having his feet set in concrete by developers or simply hit by falling crucifixes or golf balls..
- Gloria Millington (played by Celia Imrie) is a legal secretary who is recovering from the death of her husband a year before the first series. She has a young son (played by Angus Imrie, the actress's son) and is "the sister he (Peter) deserved" but never had. Gloria is antagonised by Beatrice during the first series, but the two become friends after a day out together.
- Sidney Snell (played by Tony Slattery) is a smelly local and a frequent client of Peter who often finds ways to sue the local council. Slattery described Snell as an "everyman anti-hero", with Wheeler calling him an "unlikely guardian of Market Shipborough" on account of his numerous attempts to stop building work. Snell develops a close friendship with the recently widowed Gloria in the first series. To emphasise his unwashed state, the wardrobe department rotated Snell's costume only once in the first series.
- Aunt Auriel (played by Phyllida Law) is Peter's aunt and confidante. She lives in a retirement home on a large country estate.
- Nigel Pearson (played by John Thomson) is introduced in the second series as the captain of Market Shipborough's cricket team. Peter investigates Nigel after discovering he has not honoured sponsorship contracts made with several local businesses. Nigel confides in Peter that his marriage is breaking down - his wife (played by Rachel Fielding) is having an affair with Simon, and he returns the money owed. Nigel returns as a regular cast member in the third series, now working as a relationship counsellor.
- Simon Kingdom (played by Dominic Mafham) was an unseen character (with the exception of some photographs) in the first series, with the final episode revealing that he had fled to Dublin, apparently to escape large debts. In the second series, he returns to Market Shipborough and is charged with faking his own death. Simon has a reputation as a ne'er-do-well, and usually behaves in a self-centred and womanising manner. At the end of the second series, he disappears after fleeing from a Mafia-type gang during a storm. It is revealed at the start of series three that he now really is dead, with the opening scene showing Peter, Beatrice and Auriel standing at his grave.

Thomas Fisher plays Ted, a local yokel who is the landlord of the local pub and a friend of Sidney Snell. Gerard Horan plays DC Yelland, who is in charge of prosecuting the Simon Kingdom case but also sometimes appears on other matters. Both Ted and Yelland's roles are expanded in the second series. In the first series, Maryann Turner plays a recurring minor character referred to only as "Mrs Thing", whom Peter is constantly trying to avoid. Simon's pregnant partner, Honor O'Sullivan (played by Kelly Campbell), is introduced in the final episode of the first series. By the second series she has given birth to baby Daniel and is living with Beatrice and Peter, where she develops an attraction to Lyle. She leaves after Simon returns.

Guest appearances in the first series are made by Lynsey De Paul (as a high-living philanthropist who dies of a heart attack in her pool in episode one), Steve Pemberton (as a married sweatshop operator who fathers a child with an illegal immigrant worker in episode two), Richard Wilson (as Peter's old university tutor in episode four), Robert Bathurst (as a cross-dressing husband in episode five), Joss Ackland (as an Auschwitz survivor in episode six), and Rory Bremner (as a vicar, also in episode six). Bremner, known more for satire than acting, has joked that he played the vicar "as" Michael Howard and Rowan Williams and that his character's name was "Jane", due to an error in the script. Wilson returned for the second series, which also includes roles by Lucy Benjamin and Richard Briers, and Diana Quick. Local residents appear as background extras and in crowd scenes. Guest stars confirmed for the third series include Pippa Haywood, James and Oliver Phelps, June Whitfield, Peter Sallis, Colin Baker, Sandi Toksvig, Jack Dee, Miriam Margolyes, Adrian Scarborough, Sophie Winkleman, Anna Massey and Jaye Griffiths.

== Production ==
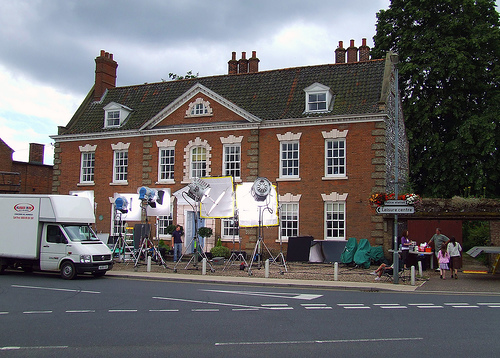
Filming of the second series outside Oakleigh House in 2007

Wheeler spent two years developing the idea for the series before filming began in 2006 and proposed the Peter character as "helping people more than doing the law". The series was originally to be based around a probate solicitor, with the title Where There's a Will. Stephen Fry disapproved of the title and raised the point that it would be difficult to produce six scripts featuring his character dealing with probate issues. A series of six episodes was announced in June 2006.

The series is primarily a vehicle for Fry, and was his first television drama series for ITV since the conclusion of Jeeves and Wooster in 1993. Most of the main cast had worked with Fry before: Slattery had been in Footlights with Fry, and he and Law appeared with him in Peter's Friends; Imrie appeared in Gormenghast though the two did not share any scenes. Already being acquainted meant the cast appeared more relaxed in front of the camera. Norris had not made any appearances with the rest of the cast beyond a credit with Imrie in Hospital!, a one-off Channel 5 comedy. However, she is married to Wheeler, and he had previously written for Wire in the Blood, in which she formerly starred. She took the role as a change of pace from the "ice maiden" characters she often portrays.

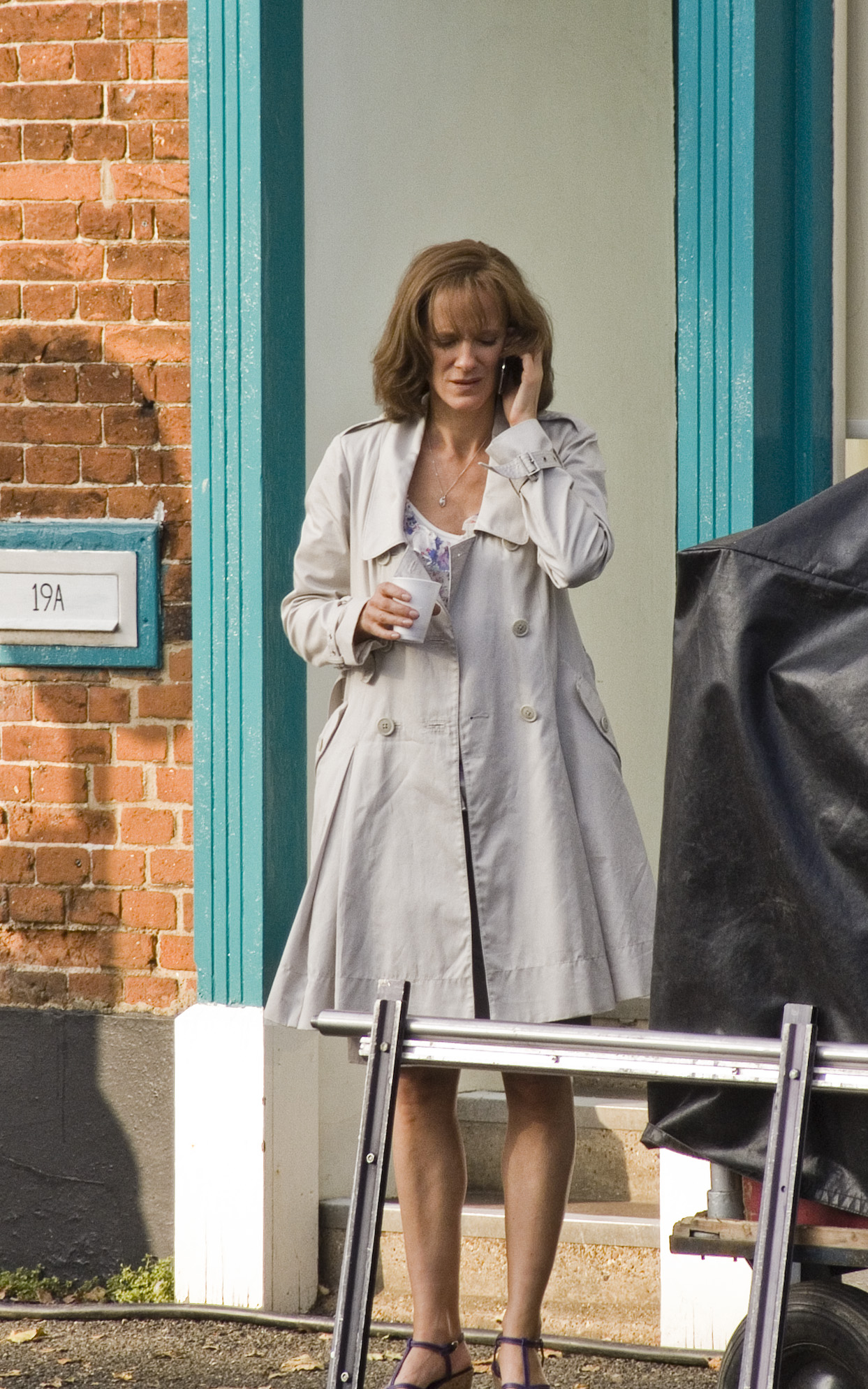
Hermione Norris on location during filming of series three

Location filming is primarily based in Swaffham. Filming of the first series began on 10 July 2006 and was scheduled for 12 weeks. Shooting also took place in nearby Hunstanton, Holkham, Thetford and Dereham. Beach and harbour scenes were shot at Wells-next-the-Sea, as well as the lifeboat station being used for that of Market Shipborough. Fry recommended Swaffham to the producers, citing market towns as "more revealing of what Britain is like than a city is." Locations used within Swaffham include Oakleigh House (as the offices of Kingdom and Kingdom) and the Greyhound pub (renamed "The Startled Duck"), among others. The producers noted that Oakleigh House was ideal for the offices as there was an "authenticity" of opening the door straight onto the market square, instead of a transition from studio to location footage.

First-series scenes featuring Fry driving an Alvis TE 21 were placed in jeopardy when the actor was caught speeding in May 2006. His counsel successfully postponed the hearing until December, allowing filming to resume unaffected (Fry was eventually banned from driving for six months). The first two episodes were directed by Robin Sheppard, the third and fourth by Metin Hüseyin and the final two by Sandy Johnson. A making-of special was filmed for the ITV3 Behind the Scenes strand and was broadcast on 27 May 2007, immediately following the end of episode six on ITV.

Filming of the second series was scheduled in two blocks: the first—directed by Andrew Grieve—ran from 2 July to 11 August and the second—directed by Edward Hall—from 20 August to 29 September. Shooting was again based in Swaffham. Norris took a break from filming in August to give birth to her daughter, returning to the set to complete her scenes in September.

Series 3 commenced filming in July 2008. Scenes were filmed on Holkham beach featuring the Blues and Royals of the Household Cavalry, who have been based in nearby Watton. During September, scenes set in Stockport, Greater Manchester, were filmed in King's Lynn and Halifax. Shooting concluded at the end of the month. Edward Hall returned to direct three episodes.

== Reception ==
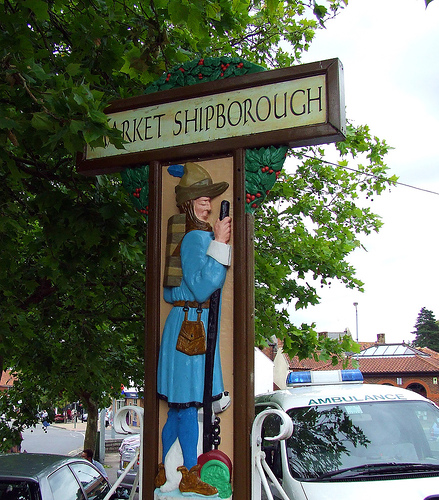
The Swaffham town sign, depicting the Pedlar of Swaffham, is altered to show "the Tinker of Market Shipborough". The filming of Kingdom in Swaffham has had a positive effect on the local economy.

In a preview, Radio Times described it as "Sunday night television at its cosiest", though called the plot of episode one "feeble". Comments by The Stage echoed this, calling the storyline a "run of the mill affair", but praised the locations and referred to the series as a whole as "nice". Following the broadcast of the first episode The Guardian wrote that the series "slips down as smoothly as a pint of Adnams" and (with tongue in cheek) welcomed it as a change from "loutish" Michael Kitchen in "relentlessly vulgar" fellow Sunday-night drama Foyle's War. The Times had a negative view, awarding the episode one star out of five and criticising Stephen Fry for "playing Stephen Fry". The casting of the other characters was also criticised, though the costuming was wryly praised.

The programme received some criticism in Norfolk for its inaccurate depiction of local accents. Local journalist and broadcaster Keith Skipper told the Eastern Daily Press: "If they are going to set these dramas in a specific location with locals and extras surely they should get the accent right otherwise it is self defeating." An ITV spokesman told the paper: "We hired a professional dialect coach to help the actors achieve their Norfolk accent. The Norfolk accent is different in one area of Norfolk to another. What we are trying to achieve is something that resembles a Norfolk accent that cannot be pinned down." However, he failed to identify any area of Norfolk in which the accent contains a Mummerset "r".

ITV executive chairman Michael Grade was pleased with the series, describing it at a conference in June 2007 as having "done well for [ITV]" in the prestigious 9 p.m. slot.

Following Simon's reappearance in the second series, a writer on The Herald expressed disappointment that the air of mystery had gone from the programme; "As the sage and saintly Peter, Stephen Fry no longer has any great detective-style fraternal conundrum to unravel, or agonise over." The fifth episode of Series 2 won the 9 p.m. slot with 5.4 million viewers and a 22% audience share, beating the BAFTA coverage on BBC One. The series has been compared to Doc Martin, another ITV series featuring a professional working in a rural town.

The ratings for the first episode of Series 3 were affected by a scheduling clash with the finale of The Apprentice on BBC One; the episode had 4.95 million viewers and a 19.1% audience share.

The series has a fresh 82% on Rotten Tomatoes from 22 reviews.

=== "The Kingdom effect" ===
Filming of the series in Swaffham and surrounding areas gave a boost to the local economy, dubbed "the Kingdom effect" by producer Georgina Lowe. Businesses capitalised on the popularity of the series by offering guided tours of featured locations, as well as tourist merchandise such as "Kingdom rock" and postcards. Lowe gave a lecture to Swaffham's Iceni Partnership in 2007, in which she explained that the production team used local businesses "for everything from equipment and scaffold rental to buying props, costumes, food and drink". By the end of the filming of the second series, Parallel Productions had invested approximately £2.5 million into the local economy.

== Ratings ==
=== Series 1 ===
Date	Episode	Viewers (millions)
22 April 2007	1	8.55
29 April 2007	2	7.05
6 May 2007	3	5.44
13 May 2007	4	5.89
20 May 2007	5	6.31
27 May 2007	6	6.28

=== Series 2 ===
Date	Episode	Viewers (millions)
13 January 2008	1	5.80
20 January 2008	2	6.16
27 January 2008	3	5.41
3 February 2008	4	5.23
10 February 2008	5	5.65
17 February 2008	6	5.69

=== Series 3 ===
Date	Episode	Viewers (millions)
7 June 2009	1	5.32
14 June 2009	2	4.70
21 June 2009	3	4.76
28 June 2009	4	5.10
5 July 2009	5	4.94
12 July 2009	6	5.14

== Series information ==
=== Broadcast history ===
The first series aired on the ITV network in the UK at 9 p.m. on Sunday nights from 22 April to 27 May 2007. The second series was commissioned before the first episode was broadcast. It was filmed from July to September 2007 and broadcast from January to February 2008. The third series was commissioned in March 2008 and began broadcast on 7 June 2009. STV decided not to broadcast series 3.

International distribution rights were bought by Portman Film and Television, which sold the series to 14 international networks by February 2007. Seven regional European Hallmark Channels broadcast it, with other showings on NRK in Norway, RÚV in Iceland, YLE in Finland, Rai Tre in Italy and één in Flanders. The Australian rights were picked up by the Seven Network, although the ABC aired seasons 1 and 2 in 2011 and season 3 late in 2012, with TVNZ buying it for New Zealand. The programme aired in the United States on some PBS affiliates in early 2008. A wider syndication deal was struck with American Public Television later that year for the first two series to be available to all affiliates, and other public stations; the third season began distribution on 1 December 2009. In Canada, the first and second series were broadcast April–June, 2010, on the Vision TV network. The third series premièred on the Flemish channel één on 10 April 2009.

=== DVD releases ===
The first series was released by 2 Entertain Video on 28 May 2007 and includes the ITV3 Behind the Scenes special. 2 Entertain holds the worldwide rights to the DVD release in 2007. The complete second series was released on six DVDs in The Daily Telegraph and The Sunday Telegraph between 1 and 7 March 2008 and was also generally released from 15 June 2009.

=== Digital release ===
In August 2009, the six episodes of the first season were released in the United States on Hulu, as part of Hulu's partnership with ITV. As of May 2019, all 3 seasons are available on AcornTV.

=== Music ===
A soundtrack album featuring the original music from the series, composed and conducted by Mark Russell was released on 15 June 2009 and is only available through the iTunes Store at the moment. The album mainly contains music from the third series although some of it has been used earlier in the series.
