= The Cement Garden =

1978 novel by Ian McEwan

- First edition cover
- Author: Ian McEwan
- Cover artist: Ron Bowen
- Language: English
- Publisher: Jonathan Cape
- Publication date: 1978
- Publication place: United Kingdom
- Media type: Print (Hardcover)
- Pages: 138
- ISBN: 0-224-01628-8

The Cement Garden is a 1978 novel by Ian McEwan. It was adapted into a 1993 film of the same name by Andrew Birkin, starring Charlotte Gainsbourg and Andrew Robertson. The Cement Garden has had a positive reception since its original publication.

== Plot summary ==
In The Cement Garden, the father of four children dies. About a year later, the children's mother also dies. In order to avoid being taken into foster care, the children hide their mother's death from the outside world by encasing her corpse in cement in the cellar. The children then attempt to live on their own.

The narrator is Jack (15) and his siblings are Julie (17), Sue (13), and Tom (6). Jack describes how, when they were younger, he and Julie would play doctor with their younger sister, although he is aware that their version of the game occasionally broke boundaries. Jack then mentions how he longs to do the same to his older sister but it is not allowed. Sexual tension between Jack and his older sister, Julie, becomes increasingly obvious as they take over the roles of "mother" and "father" in the house, which is gradually deteriorating into squalor.

When Julie begins to date a young man called Derek, aged 23, and invites him to their house, Jack feels jealous and shows hostility towards him. Derek gets a hint that something is hidden in their cellar, and becomes more and more interested while the children attempt to hide it from him. When a smell begins to emanate from the cellar, the children tell him their dead dog, Cosmo, is encased in the cement. Derek then helps to re-seal the cement which their mother is hidden in. Eventually, Tom tells Jack that Derek has told him he believes their mother is in the cellar.

Jack enters naked into Julie's bedroom, apparently absent-mindedly. Only Tom is present. Jack climbs into Tom's cot and begins to talk to him about their parents. Julie enters and, seemingly unsurprised by her younger brother's nakedness, jokes that "it is big." Jack and Julie sit on the bed while Tom sleeps, and Julie takes off her clothes. While talking, Jack and his older sister become more and more intimate with each other. Right at this point, Derek enters. He remarks that he has seen it all and calls them "sick." When he leaves, Jack and Julie begin to have sex. A thudding noise is heard below, and their sister Sue comes and informs them that Derek is smashing up the concrete coffin. The three begin to talk, remembering their mother. After a while, police lights illuminate the room through the bedroom window.

== Reception ==
The Cement Garden received positive reviews from critics. A reviewer for Kirkus Reviews argued that although one important event in the novel seemed staged for effect, the grim book "is somehow suffused with light and warmth. Having worked such wonders with such intrinsically stunted material, McEwan calls attention to his undeniable talent. If he and his characters can stretch to measure up to that prose, we may be watching a major novelist in the making." Robert Towers of The New York Review of Books deemed The Cement Garden "morbid, full of repellent imagery – and irresistibly readable." Paul Abelman of The Spectator called it "just about perfect", and Blake Morrison declared in The Times Literary Supplement that the novel "should consolidate Ian McEwan's reputation as one of the best young writers in Britain today".

In The New York Times, however, Anne Tyler praised McEwan as a skillful writer but stated that "these children are not--we trust--real people at all. They are so consistently unpleasant, unlikable and bitter that we can't believe in them (even hardened criminals, after all, have some good points) and we certainly can't identify with them. Jack's eyes, through which we're viewing this story, have an uncanny ability to settle upon the one distasteful detail in every scene, and to dwell on it, and to allow only that detail to pierce the cotton wool that insulates him. [...] It seems weak-stomached to criticize a novel on these grounds, but if what we read makes us avert our gaze entirely, isn't the purpose defeated?"

In a review of the film adaptation, John Krewson of The A.V. Club referred to McEwan's original book as a "beautiful but disturbing novel". Kitty Aldridge of The Independent argued in a 2012 article, "McEwan's calm, exquisite sentences lead you into the secret and strange world of the post-war middle-class family, with its unique clash of make-do-and-mend and sexual revolution. Devastating information is relayed in short, cool-headed paragraphs, increasing the charged atmosphere of disorder and horror. [...] The novel is a masterclass in clarity and precision." In a lukewarm review for a stage adaptation of the novel, Charles Spencer of The Daily Telegraph said that the book remains "powerful and disconcerting" despite a narrative that is clearly heavily influenced by Lord of the Flies. Stephen King placed it 66th on a list of books that had influenced him.

In a 2018 article, Elaina Patton of The New Yorker praised the author's extensive discussion of the minutiae of the environment, writing, "McEwan's evocative detail and perfect British prose lend a genteel decorum to the death and decay that surround the family. [...] McEwan's lovers are loathsome, a far cry from the romanticized versions in the 1993 film adaptation. But they're all the more captivating for it." The Cement Garden is David Aaronovitch's favorite McEwan novel. Eileen Battersby of The Irish Times called the book "shocking" and placed it fifth along with The Comfort of Strangers (1981) in her list of recommended books by the author. It was also ranked one of the author's five essential books by Book Marks in 2019.

=== Controversy ===
Several critics suggested that the plot bore a close resemblance to Julian Gloag's Our Mother's House. McEwan denied having read that work and no formal charges of plagiarism were filed.

== In popular culture ==
A quote from the book can be heard in the opening of Madonna's song "What It Feels Like for a Girl".

The Cement Garden was adapted into a film of the same name by Andrew Birkin in 1993, starring Charlotte Gainsbourg and Andrew Robertson. In March 2008, it was adapted for the first time for the stage by FallOut Theatre in Cambridge. A developed version of this adaption opened in London at The Vaults, Waterloo, starring George MacKay and Ruby Bentall in January 2014.

== Anthology ==
The Cement Garden was included in the book Horror: Another 100 Best Books (2005) by Stephen Jones.

== Bibliography ==
- Malcolm, David (2002). Understanding Ian McEwan. Univ of South Carolina Press. ISBN 978-1-57003-436-7.
