= Hollow Reed =

1996 film

- Theatrical release poster
- Directed by: Angela Pope
- Screenplay by: Paula Milne
- Story by: Neville Bolt
- Starring: Martin Donovan; Joely Richardson; Ian Hart; Jason Flemyng; Sam Bould
- Cinematography: Remi Adefarasin
- Edited by: Sue Wyatt
- Music by: Anne Dudley
- Distributed by: Channel Four Films
- Release date: 18 April 1997 (US)
- Running time: 104 min (US)
- Countries: United Kingdom; Germany; Spain
- Language: English
- Box office: $265,732

Hollow Reed is a 1996 film drama directed by Angela Pope. The plot follows a divorced gay man who begins to suspect that his son is being physically abused by his ex-wife's new boyfriend. The story takes place in Bath, Somerset.

== Plot ==
Oliver Wyatt lives with his mother, Hannah Wyatt, and her live-in boyfriend, Frank Donally, and spends occasional afternoons with his father Martyn Wyatt. After Oliver suffers a series of mysterious physical injuries, which he vaguely blames on neighbourhood bullies, suspicions are raised by his father, a medical doctor, against Hannah's boyfriend, Frank.

While Martyn becomes firmly convinced Frank is abusing his son, Oliver keeps silent about the true source of his injuries, and Hannah refuses to believe Frank could be abusing her son. Martyn begins court proceedings to gain sole custody of Oliver, though his gay relationship with Tom Dixon is brought as evidence by Hannah's lawyer of the unsuitability of Martyn's home. Only after she catches Frank abusing Oliver does Hannah accept that her boyfriend is the source of Oliver's injuries, though she is swayed by Frank's pleas and agrees to remain quiet about the issue and promises Oliver that the abuse will end.

In the climactic scene, Oliver attacks Frank and is saved from a terrible beating by his father, Martyn, who instead receives Frank's wrath. As Frank's savagery is witnessed not only by Hannah, Oliver, and Tom, but also by Hannah's neighbours, who in turn call the police, the film ends with Hannah visiting Oliver, who now resides with his father, and asking him if he'd like to return to her home on occasion, now that Frank no longer lives with her. It is implied that Frank is now serving a prison sentence for abusing Oliver. Her request is met with stony silence from Oliver.

== Cast ==
- Martin Donovan as Martin Wyatt
- Joely Richardson as Hannah
- Sam Bould as Oliver Wyatt
- Ian Hart as Tom Dixon
- Jason Flemyng as Frank Donnally
- Roger Lloyd-Pack as Hannah's lawyer
- David Calder as Martin's lawyer
- Edward Hardwicke as the judge
