= The Blue Boy (film) =

- Written by: Paul Murton
- Directed by: Paul Murton
- Starring: Emma Thompson; Adrian Dunbar
- Theme music composer: Philip Appleby
- Country of origin: United Kingdom
- Original language: English

Production
- Producer: Kate Swan
- Running time: 64 minutes
- Production company: BBC Scotland

Original release
- Network: BBC Two
- Release: 2 January 1995

The Blue Boy is a 1994 British television film, starring Emma Thompson. In the story, a couple deal with personal conflict and supernatural happenings while spending the weekend at a secluded loch.

== Plot ==
Joe Bonnar breaks off his affair with a woman named Beth when his wife, Marie, falls pregnant. To try and fix their marriage, Joe and Marie go to a hotel in rural Scotland. Marie is told about a young boy who drowned in the nearby loch a century ago. While dealing with Joe's infidelity, Marie cannot get the story of the boy out of her mind and frequently sees his image in the lake.

== Cast ==
- Emma Thompson as Marie Bonnar
- Adrian Dunbar as Joe Bonnar
- Phyllida Law as Marie's mother
- Eleanor Bron as Christine
- David Horovitch as Robert
- Joanna Roth as Beth

== Broadcasting and reception ==
The film was first shown on BBC Two on 2 January 1995. In America, it aired on 2 October 1994 as part of PBS's Masterpiece Theatre series.

The review in Entertainment Weekly gave the film a C grade, and called it a "slow muddle", saying that it was "frequently impossible to tell why Marie is rattled and teary: Is it because of her husband's philandering or the spectral visions she has of the boy turned blue from the freezing water?" and that the rest of the cast "seem lost and irrelevant" because of the emphasis on Thompson. Conversely, on the British Film Institute website Sergio Angelini praised "the finesse with which it introduces supernatural elements into an otherwise straightforward-seeming narrative about a couple coping with marital problems".

== Background ==
The story of the blue boy, a four-year-old who drowned in nearby Loch Eck, is told at the Coylet Inn at Coylet.
