= Yesterday's Men (TV programme) =

British television documentary

- Genre: Documentary
- Country of origin: United Kingdom
- Original language: English

Yesterday's Men is a British documentary that appeared as part of the 24 Hours series (BBC 1) on 17 June 1971. The programme is remembered for provoking a clash between the Labour Party and the BBC. According to Anthony Smith, the editor of 24 Hours at the time, the film led to "the biggest and most furious row that a television programme in the English language has ever provoked."

== Documentary ==
The "History of the BBC" section of the corporation's website states on its page on the Yesterday's Men controversy: "Straight-dealing is one of the principles of BBC programme making, but it has not always been followed." The programme makers reversed the slogan the Labour Party had used in the 1970 general election against the Conservatives (who won) to apply to the members of the former Labour government then in opposition. As far as they knew, the programme's title was "Her Majesty’s Loyal Opposition"; the programme's real title was not disclosed to participants. They were not informed that it would feature a satirical song with this title commissioned from The Scaffold pop group. Former Prime Minister Harold Wilson and his colleagues "were effectively tricked into taking part in a programme that would ridicule them" according to the BBC's own account. The normal procedure would have been to refer the matter of the song upwards in the management hierarchy, but this was not done.

The objective of the programme, envisioned David Dimbleby, was to analyze the Labour Party's first year in opposition. Historian Jon Lawrence commented that "the programme was widely viewed as a deliberate attempt to undermine the folksy, down-to-earth image of Wilson and his fellow Labour ex-ministers by presenting them as driven above all by money and personal ambition." The tone outraged Labour, particularly as a companion film on Edward Heath and his Conservative government broadcast the following evening Mr. Heath's Quiet Revolution was thought to be much more positive.

During Wilson's interview in his room at the House of Commons, Dimbleby asked him to reveal the precise fee he had been paid by The Sunday Times for the serialisation rights of his memoirs. This, plus the accusation that he might have profited from his access to secret government papers led to a heated exchange. According to press secretary Joe Haines, questions about Wilson's book were excluded from the agreement, although this detail was disputed. This portion of the interview was not broadcast. The transcript soon leaked despite threats from Wilson. "Inadvertently it seemed, we'd stumbled upon this legal tax avoidance scheme", Dimbleby said in 2013. According to him, as a first-time author, Wilson had been paid a small fee by his publisher, resulting in tax-free royalties.

In addition to Wilson, the documentary features interviews with former cabinet ministers including James Callaghan, Roy Jenkins, Denis Healey, and Barbara Castle. Future prime minister (and Wilson's eventual successor) Callaghan was thought to be already too old for the job at almost 60. Jenkins tried to evade the question of whether—owing to his optimistic view of the entry into the European Economic Community (later the European Union)—he might ultimately lead a party faction in a split over the issue.

The political difficulties of the opposition are discussed, including the problems implicit in opposing the Industrial Relations Bill when the Labour government had made its attempt, with the "In Place of Strife" white paper, to change the legal framework under which industrial disputes should proceed. Callaghan, who had opposed "In Place of Strife", refused to say whether it was appropriate for Castle to shadow her previous portfolio. Peter Jenkins, a journalist on The Guardian, was interviewed about the political situation and leading figures.

== Repercussions and responses ==
Haines complained about the documentary to Charles Curran, the BBC's director general, immediately after the filming of the Wilson interview had concluded. Lord Goodman, Wilson's solicitor, explored the legal possibilities of gaining an injunction to prevent its broadcast, which was not pursued. Shortly before transmission, Wilson asked the governors to intervene, and contrary to usual practice, the governor's chairman Lord Hill, and some of his colleagues, saw the programme before it went out. As Nick Robinson argues: "Instead of defending the management and inquiring afterward into whether they'd carried out their jobs properly, the governors had taken over editorial control at the prompting of a political leader."

In response to the decision not to transmit the question about Wilson's memoirs, Dimbleby and director-producer Angela Pope had their names removed from the credits. Journalist Robert Kee thought at the time that the programme was "a vulgarly brilliant equivalent of the newspaper cartoon" and that it was "the duty of a healthy Fourth Estate to reflect some [disrespect]." According to Tony Benn in his diary, those responsible for the programme "knifed Harold as hard as they could."

In an internal contemporary memo, John Crawley, assistant to Charles Curran, thought "the title and the commissioned song ... [gave] the programme the flavour of malice that ruined it." Later in 1971, the governors issued a partial apology for the film, and a BBC Programmes Complaints Commission was established in October. Subsequently, Dimbleby detected a "rather hideous softening" in the way politicians were questioned, and BBC–Labour relations took time to return to normal. The Annan Committee Report in 1977 commented that the controversy had led to "caution, lack of direction, touchiness and unsteadiness" at the BBC.

John Simpson, reflecting in 2010, wrote that while the programme was "clever and funny", it was also "distinctly shallow, poking its finger into the eye of authority merely for the sake of it." The Corporation agreed not to show the film again during Wilson's lifetime, and it was not screened until a Harold Wilson Night on the BBC Parliament channel in 2013 commemorating the fiftieth anniversary of Wilson becoming Labour leader.
