= Jenny Howe =

British actress and theatre practitioner (born 1950)

- Born: Jennifer A. Howe; 1950 (age 75–76); England
- Occupations: Actress, theatre practitioner
- Years active: 1970s–2020s
- Spouse: Robert Cooper (divorced)
- Children: 2

Jenny Howe (born 1950) is a British actress and theatre practitioner. Trained at the London Academy of Music and Dramatic Art, she began her career in repertory theatre in the early 1970s before becoming a prolific character actress on British television. She is best known for her role as the headmistress Mrs Keele in Grange Hill, and later appeared in series including The Bill, Casualty, Holby City, EastEnders and Silent Witness, as well as in films including Truly Madly Deeply and The Heart of Me.

== Early life and training ==
Howe trained at the London Academy of Music and Dramatic Art (LAMDA) from around 1969 to 1972. During her training she appeared in student productions including Alice (1970), Little Boxes and The Coffee Lace (1971), and The Importance of Being Earnest (1971). As well as theatre, she noted her interests in her early twenties were sailing and painting.

== Career ==
Howe's first professional appearance came in 1972, when she joined the Crewe Theatre Company and appeared in the production Sailor Beware. She subsequently appeared in productions including Arms and the Man and Macbeth, the latter in the role of one of the witches. She continued to work steadily in repertory and regional theatre during the 1970s, appearing at the Gateway Theatre in Chester in productions including Wanted, One Body and Dry Rot, both of which drew favourable local notice. She also worked with the Wearabout Theatre Company in Sunderland in Theatre in Education and touring productions, and later appeared with the Phoenix Theatre Company in Leicester.

In the 1980s she continued to develop her stage career, appearing at venues including the Contact Theatre in Manchester, where she was nominated for Best Supporting Performance at the Manchester Evening News Theatre Awards in 1987. In 1989 she won the Morrison Cup for her production of Hell and High Water, reflecting a parallel move into directing. Howe also performed at the National Theatre.

Alongside her theatre work, Howe developed a substantial television career. Her best-known role was as Mrs Keele, the headmistress in the BBC school drama Grange Hill, in which she appeared from 1992 to 1994. She was also a regular presence in British television drama, with appearances in series such as The Bill, Casualty, Holby City, EastEnders and Silent Witness, typically playing professional or authority figures.

Her film work included a role in Truly Madly Deeply (1990), produced by her then husband Robert Cooper, as well as later appearances in films including The Heart of Me and Puckoon.

Later in her career Howe returned to theatre, appearing at the Orange Tree Theatre in Richmond in productions including The Scapegoat and The Stingless Marionette. She also founded the production company Choiceworks.

== Personal life ==
Howe married theatre director and producer Robert Cooper in 1983; the couple later divorced. They had two daughters, Zoe Cooper, who became a playwright, and Emily Cooper.

In 1987 the family were living in Glossop while Cooper was working in Belfast, and a later profile noted that Howe's acting career influenced family decisions about relocation.

== Filmography ==
=== Television ===
Year(s)	Title	Role	Notes
2024	KAOS	Laundry Mistress	1 episode
2021	Dalgliesh	Grace	2 episodes
2021	Silent Witness	Coroner	1 episode
2019	A Throne of Shadows	Maud	2 episodes
2017	Cold Feet	Ruby Savage	1 episode
2004–2016	Doctors	Elizabeth Gunn / Dr Louise Forrester	2 episodes
2000–2016	EastEnders	Tina / Judge Harriet Steele / Magistrate	3 episodes
2014	Lewis	Moira	1 episode
2013	The Guilty	Child Psychologist	1 episode
2011	Psychoville	Sister Abigail	1 episode
2010	Law & Order: UK	Iris Robinson	1 episode
2009	Margaret	Cynthia Crawford	Television film
2008	The Wrong Door	Various	2 episodes
2008	My Family	Sister Ann	1 episode
2007	The Whistleblowers	Opposition MP	1 episode
2006	Suburban Shootout	Felicity the Librarian	1 episode
2006	Rosemary & Thyme	Manageress	1 episode
2006	Time Trumpet	Various	1 episode
2005	Love Soup	Mrs Blunt	1 episode
2001–2005	Where the Heart Is	Social Worker / Solicitor	2 episodes
2004	Marple	Maid	1 episode
2004	Peep Show	Registrar	1 episode
2004	Spooks	Mrs Sayle	1 episode (uncredited)
2004	Noah & Saskia	Mrs Privett	1 episode
2004	Life Begins	Female Customer	1 episode
2003	Fortysomething	Maureen Cowley	1 episode
2003	Strange	Librarian	1 episode
1990–2003	The Bill	Betty Fraser / Eileen / Margaret Trent	4 episodes
2002	Rose and Maloney	Wendy	1 episode
2002	Wire in the Blood	Dr Sandra Bass	1 episode
2001	Shades	Judy Jacobs	1 episode
1999	Hope and Glory	Chrissie Hill	1 episode
1999	A Touch of Frost	Anne Waldren	1 episode
1996	Dangerfield	Inspector Caines	1 episode
1992–1994	Grange Hill	Mrs Keele	36 episodes
1992	Anglo Saxon Attitudes	Party Guest	1 episode
1990	Inspector Morse	Angry Neighbour	1 episode
1989	Dramarama	Amber	1 episode
1989	Coronation Street	Mrs Lambert	1 episode
1986	Emmerdale	Sally James	4 episodes
1980	Lady Killers	Miss Thomas	1 episode

=== Film ===
Year	Title	Role	Notes
2009	Hell's Pavement	Magistrate	
2007	Daphne	Tod	Television film
2005	The Year London Blew Up: 1974	Mrs Matthews	Television film
2004	Passer By	Magistrate	Television film
2003	Too Good to Be True	Registrar	Television film
2002	Good Thing	Irene	
2002	The Heart of Me	Nurse	
2002	Puckoon	Mrs Croucher	
2000	Madame Bovary	Sister Evangeline	Television film
1999	The Turn of the Screw	Cook	Television film
1990	Truly Madly Deeply	Burge	
