= The Captives (film) =

2004 film

- Directed by: Jude Miller
- Written by: Jude Miller
- Produced by: Jude Miller
- Starring: Elliot Miller; Sarah "Sadie" Jones
- Cinematography: Eric Lilly of Digital Vision Works
- Edited by: Eric Lilly of Digital Vision Works, Judy Miller, John Pabst
- Music by: Jake Krack, Elliot Miller, Andrew Miller, Scott Schmidt, John Sheltmier
- Production company: Jude True Blue Productions
- Release date: July 31, 2004
- Running time: 58 minutes
- Country: United States
- Language: English
- Budget: $75,000

The Captives is a 2004 American film starring Elliot Miller, produced and directed by Jude Miller for Jude True Blue Productions. It is based on the true story of Mary Draper Ingles and her struggles during the French-Indian War. The film tells the story of Mary Draper Ingles and others in her settlement being taken captive to the Ohio Country by Shawnee Indian Warriors, and her journey home as she escaped from the tribe.

Jude Miller became interested with the story of Mary Draper Ingles after the disaster on September 11th, and began writing the screenplay in 2002. She was deeply inspired by the story of Mary Draper Ingles and her bravery and determination through trying times.

== Synopsis ==
The Seven Years’ War, better known as the French and Indian War, was a conflict between the French, British, and Native Americans over land. English land speculators encouraged people to move west and build farms. Mary Draper Ingles’ family was one of many who were recruited to move west of the mountains. As more English settlers moved west towards their lands and hunting grounds; Native American tribes revolted. They invaded English settlements, including that of Mary Draper Ingles.

== Plot ==
The movie begins in the summer of 1755, with a terrible attack on Drapers Meadow by the Shawnee Indian Warriors. Many people were killed in the attack, including Mary Draper Ingles’ mother, and her sister-in-law’s baby whose head was bashed against the side of a house. Mary, her two boys, and her sister-in-law were taken captive by the Shawnee on a long journey west to Ohio Country. Mary tried to remember important landmarks along the way in case they had a chance to escape. She tied knots in her sash each day to keep track of how long they were gone. By the end of the second day of their journey, they reached the point where Indian Creek flows into the New River. The Shawnee had two canoes secreted at the riverbank, which they used to carry captives and stolen food. The Shawnee swam with the horses. That night they camped west of the New River. At this time Will and John, Mary’s husband and brother, were setting out to rescue the captives. Mary was pregnant during the time of the trip so she had to stop and give birth alongside the river. After, they continued their trip over Flat Top Mountain and along Paint Creek.

The next stop they made was at a salt spring at Canal River to make salt. When they reached the Shawnee town which was by the Ohio and Scioto River, the warriors were welcomed home. There was a big celebration that lasted late into the night. The next morning all the captives except Mary were forced to run the gauntlet by the Shawnee. After the gauntlet, things got worse for the captives. Mary’s two boys and her sister in law were taken away. Mary had to give her baby to a caretaker named Sauwaseekau, so that she could work making shirts for the Shawnee. She was an excellent seamstress and was paid well. When Mary asked how much it would cost to get freedom for her children, she was told that she and her children were to become Shawnee.

The Shawnee started sending Mary and an Old Dutch woman out on daily trips to look for berries. Because they were alone, Mary started thinking they could escape. In preparation, they stole a little extra food each day before the trip. Mary left her baby with Sauwaseekau because she knew the baby could not survive the long journey home. Mary and the old Dutch woman set out on the trip, knowing they could not return to the Shawnee or they would be facing death. Mary and the old Dutch woman navigated themselves by the rivers. Neither of them could swim, so they had to go around the rivers making their trip even longer. After a while, hunger took toll on them, and the old Dutch woman tried to eat Mary. Mary escaped from her and found a canoe buried under leaves alongside the river. She used it to cross the river and keep distance between her and the old Dutch woman. They continued on their journey and from time to time saw each other traveling on the other side of the river and encouraged each other to keep going. After 43 days and 800 miles, Mary had arrived home to her husband, brother, and friends.

== Cast ==
- Garlan Miller - Narrator
- Sarah "Sadie" Jones - Storyteller
- Elliot Miller - Mary Draper Ingles
- Hayley Schmidt - Betty Draper
- Katie Gaughan - Draper Infant
- James Blake - Shawnee War Captain
- Kayla Walker - Thomas Ingles
- David Walker - George Ingles
- Andrew Miller - John Draper
- James Zablocki - William Ingles
- Susan Greathouse - Mrs. Stump
- Christian Hays - Chief
- Tony Gerard - Fur Trader
- Maria Hays - Sauwaseekau

== Awards and reviews ==
The Captives is the Winner of 2005 Gold Davey Award, which honors films made by small production companies. It also received the Award of Excellence in the 2005 Accolade Competition, Award of Excellence for Drama in the 2005 DV Awards, and Winner of 2004 West Virginia Filmmaker’s Film Festival for Best Docudrama.

“The South Charleston Museum is sponsoring a showing of "The Captives", the new Mary Ingles film directed by Spencer filmmaker Jude Miller, at 7 p.m.July 31, 2004 at The LaBelle Theater in downtown South Charleston. In June, the film premiered at the Robey Theater where more than 600 people saw it at two screenings. The film stars Miller's daughter, Screen Actors Guild actress Elliot Lowe Miller, in her first film role. Her performance can be compared to Nicole Kidman in "Cold Mountain". The period costumes, especially for the Shawnee warriors, are as good as anything in Hollywood film. The film was an official 'indie SAG' film which is limited to a budget of $75,000. If you love WV history, see this film." Steve Fesenmaier – Graffiti News
