= Captives =

- Theatrical release poster
- Directed by: Angela Pope
- Written by: Frank Deasy
- Produced by: David M. Thompson
- Starring: Julia Ormond; Tim Roth
- Cinematography: Remi Adefarasin
- Edited by: Dave King
- Music by: Colin Towns
- Production companies: BBC Films; Distant Horizon
- Distributed by: Entertainment Film Distributors
- Release dates: August 1994 (Venice Film Festival); 11 September 1994 (Toronto International Film Festival); 28 April 1995 (UK)
- Running time: 100 minutes
- Country: United Kingdom
- Language: English

Captives is a 1994 British romantic crime drama film directed by Angela Pope and written by the Dublin screenwriter Frank Deasy. It stars Julia Ormond, Tim Roth and Keith Allen. The picture was selected as the opening film in the Venetian Nights section of the 1994 Venice Film Festival, in addition to its selection for Gala Presentation at the 1994 Toronto International Film Festival.

== Plot ==
After the break-up of her marriage to Simon (Peter Capaldi), dentist Rachel Clifford (Julia Ormond) throws herself into work by taking an extra assignment at a local British prison. One of her patients is Philip (Tim Roth), a man nearing the end of a ten-year sentence for a crime he refuses to reveal. She later sees him on the street when he is released to attend his college class. They form a friendship that eventually turns into a secret relationship. Their relationship becomes strained when Rachel realises Philip is serving time for the murder of his wife.

Another inmate, Towler (Colin Salmon), sells drugs within the prison. He uncovers Rachel and Philip's relationship and uses his associate Kenny (Mark Strong) to intimidate her into smuggling a gun into the prison. She ultimately cannot go through with it and Philip, realising that she is out of her depth, reveals their relationship to the authorities in order to secure her help. When Kenny confronts Rachel in a diner, she uses the gun to shoot him as the police arrive.

In the aftermath, Rachel is found to have shot Kenny in self-defense and Philip is transferred to another prison. In spite of everything that has occurred, she indicates that she would like to continue her relationship with him.

== Production ==
The film was a BBC Films co-production with Distant Horizon.

== Cast ==
- Julia Ormond as Rachel Clifford
- Tim Roth as Philip Chaney
- Keith Allen as Lenny
- Mark Strong as Kenny
- Siobhan Redmond as Sue
- Peter Capaldi as Simon
- Colin Salmon as Towler
- Richard Hawley as Sexton
- Annette Badland as Maggie
- Jeff Nuttall as Harold
- Kenneth Cope as Dr. Hockley
- Bill Moody as Surgery Officer
- Nathan Dambuza as Moses
- Christina Collingridge as Katie
- Victoria Scarborough as Dental Nurse
- Anthony Kernan as "Blackie"

== Reception ==
The movie received a mixed response.

=== Box office ===
The movie grossed £29,214 in its opening weekend in the United Kingdom from 20 screens.
