= Alan Whiting =

British screenwriter

- Occupations: Screenwriter; television producer
- Years active: 1960s–present
- Notable work: Wire in the Blood; Kingdom (co-creator); The Scarlet Pimpernel; Steel River Blues; Half Broken Things; Titanic: Blood and Steel; Strike Back (series 1)
- Awards: Edgar Award nomination (2005)

Alan Whiting is a British screenwriter who has written for Wire in the Blood and Kingdom (which he also co-created).

== Career ==
Whiting's career began in the mid-1960s, contributing episodes to The Newcomers, a BBC soap opera which dealt with a London family, the Coopers, who moved to a housing estate in the fictional country town of Angleton. Into the 1980s and 1990s, he wrote for multiple series, such as Heartbeat, El C.I.D., Boon and See You Friday.

In the 2000s, Whiting wrote for the period swashbuckler The Scarlet Pimpernel and Steel River Blues. "The Darkness of Light", one of his Wire in the Blood episodes, was nominated for an Edgar Award for Best Television Feature Or Mini-Series Teleplay in 2005.

He adapted Half Broken Things as a television movie for Festival Films and it was broadcast on ITV in 2007. He later wrote the historical miniseries Titanic: Blood and Steel and some episodes of the first series of Strike Back.
