= Alan Dossor =

British theatre director

Alan Dossor (19 September 1941 – 7 August 2016) was a British theatre director.

He was artistic director of the Everyman Theatre Liverpool from 1970 to 1975. He was considered by British theatre/entertainment newspaper The Stage to have been "a major influence on some of our greatest actors and writers". - in a period described by British national newspaper The Guardian as "a golden five-year period in British regional theatre".
