= The Cement Garden (film) =

1993 film

- Film poster
- Directed by: Andrew Birkin
- Written by: Andrew Birkin; Ian McEwan
- Based on: The Cement Garden by Ian McEwan
- Produced by: Bee Gilbert; Ene Vanaveski
- Starring: Charlotte Gainsbourg; Andrew Robertson; Sinéad Cusack; Hanns Zischler; Alice Coulthard; Ned Birkin; Jochen Horst
- Cinematography: Stephen Blackman
- Edited by: Toby Tremlett
- Music by: Edward Shearmur
- Distributed by: Metro Tartan Pictures
- Release dates: February 1993; 22 October 1993 (United Kingdom)
- Running time: 105 minutes
- Country: United Kingdom
- Language: English
- Budget: £1.9 million
- Box office: £126,874 (UK) $322,975 (US)

The Cement Garden is a 1993 British drama film written and directed by Andrew Birkin. It is based on the 1978 novel written by Ian McEwan. It was entered into the 43rd Berlin International Film Festival, where Birkin won the Silver Bear for Best Director.

== Plot ==
In late 1970s England, Jack is a narcissistic 15-year-old boy living in a post-war era prefab house with his parents, his annoying 17-year-old sister Julie, 13-year-old sister Sue, and 6-year-old brother Tom. One day, while unloading large bags of cement to resurface the garden path of their home, the father collapses from a heart attack and dies. Only a few months after this tragedy, Jack's mother takes ill and becomes bedridden and frail, prompting Jack and Julie to take control of the household.

Though Jack and Julie initially clash due to Jack's immaturity and selfishness, the pair's tension gradually shifts to a romantic one as Jack develops an incestuous crush on Julie. In their new roles as the parental figures in the family, Jack finds himself escorting Sue and Tom to and from school, while Julie takes up the cooking and cleaning duties.

Jack's mother informs him that her illness has become worse and she will have to go to the hospital for a couple of months. She tells Jack and Julie not to tell anyone about her absence, or else the remaining family members will be forced into foster care and their home will be torn down. Shortly afterwards, the mother dies at home of her illness. In an attempt to conceal their mother's death from authorities and thus evade placement into foster care, Jack and Julie entomb their mother's body in the basement, in a cement sarcophagus made from the leftover bags of cement that Jack's father had bought.

The children become more withdrawn and their mental states further disintegrate as time passes with no adult supervision following their mother's death. Jack slowly matures; he stops bathing. Sue becomes more introverted, distancing herself from her siblings and confiding only in her diary. Julie forms a relationship with an older man named Derek whom Jack starts to view with jealousy and hostility. Tom, attempting to remodel himself as a girl, takes up cross-dressing, then later regresses to an infantile state, sleeping in Julie's room in a crib and drinking from a bottle.

When Derek becomes suspicious of the unpleasant smell coming from the basement and investigates, Jack lies and tells Derek that the sarcophagus contains a dead dog, subtly alluding to his mother in the process. Jack is awakened by Tom's crying; Tom reveals that Derek has told him that the sarcophagus actually contains their mother. Jack realizes that Julie has exposed their secret. The next morning, Julie wakes Jack and confides to him that she and Derek are not physically intimate and that he is an immature adult who lives with his mother. Their conversation becomes more intimate, with Julie undressing and the two cuddling while contemplating the future now that someone else knows their family's secret. Jack is convinced that they will be taken into foster care, and their house will be torn down like the other prefabs in the area. He predicts that one day, someone will only find a few bricks among tall grass. Derek suddenly walks in on the two in bed together and expresses his disgust and horror at their incest. Unperturbed, Jack and Julie continue their conversation in bed, and conclude with the shared belief that their situation is natural. The pair make love as the sound of Derek demolishing the sarcophagus reverberates throughout the house. As Jack and Julie fall asleep together, police lights flicker against the walls.

== Cast ==
- Andrew Robertson as Jack
- Charlotte Gainsbourg as Julie
- Alice Coulthard as Sue
- Ned Birkin as Tom
- Sinéad Cusack as Mother
- Hanns Zischler as Father
- Jochen Horst as Derek, Julie's friend
- Gareth Brown as William, Tom's friend
- William Hootkins as Commander Hunt (voice)
- Dick Flockhart as Truck Driver
- Mike Clark as Driver's Mate

== Reception ==
=== Critical reception ===
On Rotten Tomatoes, the film has an approval rating of 82% based on 11 reviews. Of the film, Roger Ebert wrote director Birkin "uses nuance, timing and Edward Shearmer's unsettling music to create an atmosphere in which outside values cease to matter, and life becomes a series of skirmishes between hostility and temptation. There is a little of Lord of the Flies lurking here somewhere…[the film] leads us into a world where some secrets are hidden and others indulged, and there is no restraint on its dark impulses". In a more critical review, John Powers noted in New York magazine, "Though the young actors are terrific, the movie doesn't yield its meanings easily. It hints at many themes—the origins of gender roles, the triumph of nature over culture, the future of England itself—but preserves the hermetic density of a parable".

=== Box office ===
The film opened on 22 October 1993 in the United Kingdom on 10 screens and grossed £24,018 for the weekend. It went on to gross £126,874 in the UK.

=== Year-end lists ===
- Honorable mention – Michael MacCambridge, Austin American-Statesman
- Top 12 worst (Alphabetically ordered, not ranked) – David Elliott, The San Diego Union-Tribune
- #9 Worst - Jeffrey Lyons, Sneak Previews

== In popular culture ==
The Madonna song "What It Feels Like for a Girl" opens with a spoken word sample from the movie. The quote used is a line spoken by actress Charlotte Gainsbourg: "Girls can wear jeans and cut their hair short, wear shirts and boots. 'Cause it's OK to be a boy. But for a boy to look like a girl is degrading. 'Cause you think that being a girl is degrading. But secretly you'd love to know what it's like... Wouldn't you? What it feels like for a girl".
