= Ruth Caleb =

British film and television producer

Ruth Irene Caleb OBE (born 1942) is a British film and television producer. She was appointed head of drama at BBC Wales in the mid-1980s, making her the BBC's first ever female head of drama. She is known for her work on productions that include; Pawel Pawlikowski's Last Resort, the BBC1 series Judge John Deed and Saul Dibb's Bullet Boy.

In 2012, it was announced that Caleb would partner with independent production company, Leopard Drama, the drama division of Argonon. One of her recent projects in collaboration with Argonon has been producing children’s drama series, Eve, for CBBC.

Ruth was awarded the Alan Clarke BAFTA Award in 2001, for her "outstanding personal contribution to TV" and in 2012, was granted a lifetime achievement award at the year’s Women in Film and Television Awards. The award was presented by actress Julie Walters, whom Caleb had worked with twice before; on TV film, Pat and Margaret (1994) and again, in the 2009 drama, A Short Stay in Switzerland. In 2004, she was appointed an OBE (Officer of the Order of the British Empire) for her services to drama.

Some of Caleb’s more recent credits include The Last Days of Lehman Brothers, The Whale, starring Martin Sheen and the Dylan Thomas biopic, A Poet in New York.
