= Robert Cooper (producer) =

British television producer

- Born: 1950 (age 75–76); West Bromwich, Staffordshire, England
- Occupation: Television producer
- Employer: BBC
- Known for: Head of Drama, BBC Northern Ireland
- Spouse(s): Jenny Howe (divorced); Kate Triggs
- Children: 2, including Zoe Cooper

Robert Cooper (born 1950) is a British television producer who served as Head of Drama at BBC Northern Ireland. He played a significant role in developing television drama production in Northern Ireland and is associated with the film Truly, Madly, Deeply.

== Early life and education ==
Cooper was born in West Bromwich, Staffordshire, in 1950, the son of Alan G. Cooper and Helen M. Cooper (née Brown). He was educated at Harefield Primary School, Whitehall Junior School in Uxbridge, St Nicholas Grammar School in Northwood, and Altrincham Boys' Grammar School. He later studied English and Drama at the University of Hull (1969–1972).

== Career ==
Cooper began his career at BBC Radio Humberside, working in the engineering department as a tea boy and general assistant before moving into programme production. In 1973 he joined BBC Radio Merseyside as a station assistant, where he began producing programmes, including a weekly series of short stories by local writers. During this period he worked closely with writer Alan Bleasdale, commissioning early radio drama and helping to establish new writing on local radio, work which brought him recognition including awards such as the Prix Italia and Sony awards.

His early career in Liverpool also included a period at the independent station Radio City, where he produced a range of programming including Bleasdale's Scully series and other arts output. By the mid-1970s he had moved into network production, joining the BBC in Manchester in 1976, where he directed drama for BBC Radio 3 and BBC Radio 4. Around the same time he also worked in theatre as a stage manager at the Victoria Theatre-in-the-Round in Stoke-on-Trent.

In 1977 Cooper relocated to Belfast to take up a post as a radio drama producer. There he commissioned and directed work by a wide range of Irish writers and became closely associated with the development of drama production in Northern Ireland. He remained in the province for several years, later describing his enthusiasm for producing high-quality work outside London.

He returned to Manchester in 1984, continuing to commission and direct radio drama while working with writers including Anthony Minghella. Projects developed during this period eventually led to the film Truly, Madly, Deeply, which achieved both critical and commercial success.

By 1987 Cooper had become one of the BBC's most prominent radio producers in Manchester before being appointed television drama producer in Northern Ireland, a move widely regarded as a promotion. Initially, he divided his time between Belfast and England, commuting at weekends while his family remained in Glossop.

In 1988 he was appointed Head of Drama at BBC Northern Ireland, where he played a central role in establishing a sustainable regional drama production base. Operating in a context of financial uncertainty and centralised commissioning, he developed a model in which the department competed for network funding and external investment. Under his leadership, the department expanded significantly in both scale and ambition, increasing staff, budgets and output while producing a series of award-winning dramas.

Productions during this period included A Breed of Heroes, Life After Life and The Hanging Gale, as well as co-productions such as A Man of No Importance, contributing to the emergence of Northern Ireland as a centre for television drama production.

In 2003 Cooper co-founded Great Meadow Productions with Kate Triggs, through which he continued to produce television drama for the BBC and Channel 4. Working with Triggs, he was involved in productions including the television film Margaret, which was developed over several years with the BBC, and the adaptation Room at the Top, which won the BAFTA Award for Best Mini-Series in 2013.

== Personal life ==
Cooper was married to the actress Jenny Howe, with whom he has two daughters, including playwright Zoe Cooper.

During his move to Northern Ireland in 1987, Howe remained in Glossop with their children while Cooper travelled between Belfast and England. The couple later divorced. Cooper subsequently partnered and married television producer Kate Triggs.
