= Joanna Roth =

Scottish actress (born 1965)

- Born: Joanna Angelis; 1965 (age 60–61); Aarhus, Denmark
- Occupation: Actress
- Years active: 1990–present
- Spouse: John Hannah (m. 1996)
- Children: 2

Joanna Roth (nee Angelis, born 1965) is a Danish-British actress. She trained at the Royal Academy of Dramatic Art (RADA) and has appeared in film, television, video games, and theatre. She is known for her portrayal of Ophelia in the film Rosencrantz & Guildenstern Are Dead.

She is married to Scottish actor John Hannah. Roth has worked alongside her husband in the BBC One legal drama New Street Law, the ITV detective series Rebus, the romantic drama film Sliding Doors, and on stage at London's Bush Theatre in A Bright Light Shining. In the realm of voice acting, she provided the voice of Aveline Vallen in the video game Dragon Age II.

== Filmography ==
=== Film ===
Year	Title	Role	Notes
1990	Rosencrantz & Guildenstern Are Dead	Ophelia	
1994	Mary Shelley's Frankenstein	Marie	
1997	Snow White: A Tale of Terror	Liliana	
1998	Sliding Doors	Suspicious Girl	
2016	Away	Tanya	

=== Television ===
Year	Title	Role	Notes
1990	The Real Charlotte	Francie Fitzpatrick	3 episodes
1990	Omnibus	Eugenie	Episode: "Van Gogh"
1990	Boon	Jan Melzer	Episode: "A Night at the Ballet"
1991	Spatz	Alexandria Kitchenko	Episode: "From Russia With Love"
1991	Sherlock Holmes	Alice Turner	Episode: "The Boscombe Valley Mystery"
1991	Jute City	Caroline	3 episodes
1992	Stalin	Svetlana	TV movie
1993	Strathblair	Tansy Stewart	4 episodes
1994	The Blue Boy	Beth	TV movie
1995	The Plant	Connie	TV movie
1996	In Suspicious Circumstances	Lady Dudley	Episode: "An Evil Business"
1996	Soldier Soldier	Capt Shelley Enright	Episode: "Walking on Air"
1997	Bramwell	Isobel Kilshaw	
1997	See You Friday	Lucy	6 episodes
1998	Smith & Jones	—	
2000	The Mrs Bradley Mysteries	Lacey Prideux	Episode: "Laurels Are Poison"
2000	Rebus	Eve Kendal	Episode: "Black and Blue"
2000	The Scarlet Pimpernel	Francoise Picard	Episode: "Friends and Enemies"
2001	Two Thousand Acres of Sky	Helen Kennedy	6 episodes
2002	In Deep	Tania Lamb	2 episodes
2002–2007	Holby City	Marion Wooding / Susan Bradshaw	3 episodes
2005	Sea of Souls	Patience Green	2 episodes
2005	Judge John Deed	Viv Hurst	Episode: "In Defense of Others"
2005	Spooks	Rebecca Sinclair	
2006–2007	New Street Law	Judge Rene Newland	6 episodes
2008	The Bill	Nicola Parry	2 episodes
2008–2010	Doctors	Dr. Gillian Roper / Patricia Leeson	2 episodes
2009	Midsomer Murders	Melanie Jeffers	
2010	Lewis	Christine Hawkins	Episode: "Falling Darkness"
2010	Taggart	Lorna Beattie	Episode: "Abuse of Trust"
2011	Threesome	Jenny	2 episodes
2014	The Widower	Trisha	2 episodes
2014	A Touch of Cloth	Deborah Something	2 episodes
2016	Endeavour	Prudence Maddox	Episode: "Arcadia"
2016	In Plain Sight	Bridget Manuel	3 episodes

=== Video games ===
Year	Title	Role
2011	Dragon Age II	Aveline Vallen (voice)
2015	Final Fantasy XIV: Heavensward	Hydaelyn (voice)
2021	Final Fantasy XIV: Endwalker	Venat / Hydaelyn (voice)
