= Andrew N. Robertson =

British actor

Andrew N. Robertson (born 1974) is a British actor best known for his performances in The Cement Garden and the Gormenghast series. He is also a musician and former academic researcher and has published work on automatic accompaniment for rock music at the conference on New Interfaces for Musical Expression.

In May 2009, Robertson was awarded a research fellowship of the Royal Academy of Engineering for his work on digital music. Robertson was a research student at Queen Mary, University of London at the Centre for Digital Music specialising in interactive real-time musical systems, where he obtained a PhD. In January 2011, Robertson developed software called "B-Keeper" which would allow drummers in rock bands to enhance their live performances. Robertson is also a former member of a band playing mainly space rock music called Higamos Hogamos which trialled the "B-Keeper" software that he developed.
