= David M. Thompson =

British film and television producer (born 1950)

- Born: David Marcus Thompson; 18 July 1950 (age 75); Hackney, London, England, UK
- Occupations: Film producer, television producer
- Years active: 1978–present

David Marcus Thompson (born 18 July 1950 in Hackney, London) is a British film and television producer, and the editor of several books about film directors.

== Overview ==
Thompson worked for the BBC from 1978 as a film programmer and documentary maker. In 1981 he filmed Woza Albert!. From 1997 he was head of BBC Films. Up until 2007, BBC Films was run and funded as a private company, with its own offices in Mortimer Street around the corner from Broadcasting House, while still under the full control of the BBC.

In 2007, a re-structure of the division saw it re-integrated into the main BBC Fiction department of BBC Vision, under the control of Jane Tranter. As a result, it moved out of its independent offices into Television Centre and David Thompson, previously head of BBC Films, left to start his own film production company, Origin Pictures.

The films he has produced for Origin Pictures include The Awakening, An Education, and The Sense of an Ending. He has continued to executive-produce films for the BBC, including The History Boys (2006) and the remake of Brideshead Revisited (2008).

David Thompson's two-part BBC documentary on the films of Jean Renoir in 1993 led to him editing an anthology of the director's letters for Faber & Faber, Jean Renoir: Letters (1994, with Lorraine LoBianco). For the same publisher, he has also edited Levinson on Levinson (1992),Scorsese on Scorsese (1996, with Ian Cristie), and Altman on Altman (2006).
