= Paul Murton =

Scottish TV presenter and broadcaster

- Born: 1957 (age 68–69)
- Occupations: TV presenter and broadcaster, film-maker, and historian

Paul Murton is a Scottish television presenter and broadcaster, film-maker, and historian, working primarily on the BBC with an emphasis on travelogues in Scotland. Born in 1957 and raised in Ardentinny on the shores of Loch Long, Argyll, Scotland, where his parents ran a small hotel, Murton is best known for his series Scotland's Clans, Grand Tours of Scotland, Grand Tours of the Scottish Islands and Grand Tours of Scotland's Lochs. Murton is a graduate of the University of Aberdeen and the National Film and Television School. Before writing and presenting his Grand Tours series, he directed several TV dramas, including Bramwell, The Bill, Casualty and River City. In 2021 he wrote the biographical novel The Highlands, published by Birlinn. He is married with five children and lives in Scotland.
