= Seamus McGarvey =

Northern Irish cinematographer (b. 1967)

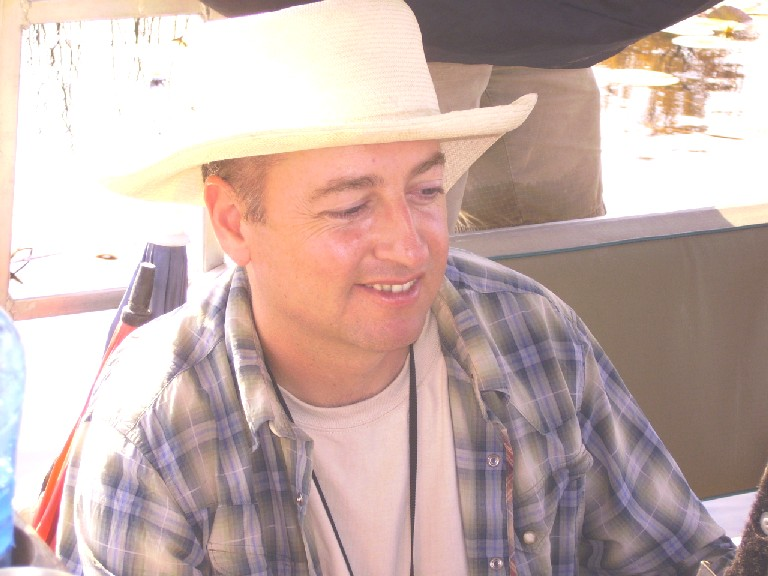
- McGarvey filming The No. 1 Ladies' Detective Agency
- Born: 29 June 1967 (age 59); Armagh, Northern Ireland
- Education: University of Westminster
- Years active: 1989–present
- Spouse: Lorna Tucker

Seamus McGarvey ASC, BSC (born 29 June 1967) is a cinematographer from Northern Ireland, known for his work with directors Joe Wright, Lynne Ramsay and Sam Taylor-Johnson. He has received two Oscar nominations for Best Cinematography, for Joe Wright's Atonement and Anna Karenina. He is also a four-time BAFTA Award and Primetime Emmy Award nominee, and a seven-time IFTA Film & Drama Award winner.

== Early life and education ==
McGarvey was born in Armagh in 1967, and was educated at St Patrick's Grammar School. He began his career as a still photographer, before attending film school at the University of Westminster.

== Career ==
After graduating in 1988, he began shooting short films and documentary films, including Skin, directed by Vincent O'Connell, and Atlantic, directed by Sam Taylor-Wood. In 1998, he became the youngest-ever member of the British Society of Cinematographers.

He served as cinematographer on the pilot for the TV series The No. 1 Ladies Detective Agency, directed by Anthony Minghella.

His documentary work includes Lost Angels: Skid Row Is My Home, which followed his work on Wright's The Soloist, and filmed in the same locales; Harry Dean Stanton: Partly Fiction; Rolling Stones: Tip of the Tongue; and The Name of This Film Is Dogme95.

Supplementing his work on features and TV movies, McGarvey has photographed and directed over 100 music videos for various artists, including Coldplay, Paul McCartney, Dusty Springfield, The Rolling Stones, U2, and Robbie Williams.

In 2004, he received the Royal Photographic Society's Lumière Award.

In 2015, he was awarded an Honorary Doctor of Laws from Dundee University and an Honorary Doctor of Fine Arts from the University of Ulster. He is an Honorary Fellow of Edinburgh College of Art. He is featured in the book In Conversation with Cinematographers by David A. Ellis and in the book Ballinger, Alexander; New Cinematographers (2004) ISBN 978-1-85669-334-9.

== Personal life ==
McGarvey is married to Lorna Tucker, and they live in London. He has three children.

== Filmography ==
Key
†	Denotes films that have not yet been released

=== Feature films ===
Year	Title	Director	Notes
1995	Butterfly Kiss	Michael Winterbottom	
1997	Harald	Jürgen Egger	
1997	Jump the Gun	Les Blair	
1997	The Winter Guest	Alan Rickman	
1997	The Slab Boys	John Byrne	
1999	The War Zone	Tim Roth	
1999	I Could Read the Sky	Nichola Bruce	With Owen McPolin
1999	A Map of the World	Scott Elliott	
1999	The Big Tease	Kevin Allen	
2000	High Fidelity	Stephen Frears	
2001	Enigma	Michael Apted	
2002	The Hours	Stephen Daldry	
2003	The Actors	Conor McPherson	
2004	Along Came Polly	John Hamburg	
2005	Sahara	Breck Eisner	
2006	World Trade Center	Oliver Stone	
2006	Charlotte's Web	Gary Winick	
2007	Atonement	Joe Wright	
2009	The Soloist	Joe Wright	
2009	Nowhere Boy	Sam Taylor-Wood	
2011	We Need to Talk About Kevin	Lynne Ramsay	
2012	The Avengers	Joss Whedon	
2012	Anna Karenina	Joe Wright	
2014	Godzilla	Gareth Edwards	
2015	Fifty Shades of Grey	Sam Taylor-Wood	
2015	Pan	Joe Wright	With John Mathieson
2016	Nocturnal Animals	Tom Ford	
2016	The Accountant	Gavin O'Connor	
2017	Life	Daniel Espinosa	
2017	The Greatest Showman	Michael Gracey	
2018	Greta	Neil Jordan	
2018	Bad Times at the El Royale	Drew Goddard	
2021	Cyrano	Joe Wright	
2024	Without Blood	Angelina Jolie	
2025	The Accountant 2	Gavin O'Connor	
2025	Die My Love	Lynne Ramsay	
2027	Narnia: The Magician's Nephew †	Greta Gerwig	Post-production
TBA	Bare †	Lorna Tucker	Filming

=== Short films ===
Year	Title	Director	Notes
1995	Hello, Hello, Hello	David Thewlis	
1995	Skin	Vincent O'Connell	
1997	Magic Moments	Saul Metzstein	
1998	Flying Saucer Rock'n'Roll	Enda Hughes	
1998	The End	Joe Wright	
2006	Death Valley	Sam Taylor-Johnson	Segment of Destricted
2008	Love You More	Sam Taylor-Johnson	
2011	James Bond Supports International Women's Day	Sam Taylor-Johnson	
2016	Kitty	Chloë Sevigny	

=== Television ===
Year	Title	Director	Notes
1993	He-Play, She-Play	Kieron J. Walsh	Episode "Shooting to Stardom"
1994	Screen Two	Nick Ward	Episode "Look Me in the Eye"
1996	Out of the Deep Pan	Kieron J. Walsh	TV movie
2001	Wit	Mike Nichols	TV movie
2008	The No. 1 Ladies' Detective Agency	Anthony Minghella	Pilot episode
2016	Black Mirror	Joe Wright	Episode "Nosedive"
2021	The Nevers	Joss Whedon	2 episodes
2024	Mussolini: Son of the Century	Joe Wright	Miniseries

== Awards and nominations ==
Academy Awards

Year	Title	Category	Result
2008	Atonement	Best Cinematography	Nominated
2013	Anna Karenina	Best Cinematography	Nominated

BAFTA Awards

Year	Title	Category	Result
2007	Atonement	Best Cinematography	Nominated
2012	Anna Karenina	Best Cinematography	Nominated
2016	Nocturnal Animals	Best Cinematography	Nominated

American Society of Cinematographers

Year	Title	Category	Result
2007	Atonement	Outstanding Achievement in Cinematography	Nominated
2012	Anna Karenina	Outstanding Achievement in Cinematography	Nominated

British Society of Cinematographers

Year	Title	Category	Result
2007	Atonement	Best Cinematography	Nominated
2012	Anna Karenina	Best Cinematography	Won
2016	Nocturnal Animals	Best Cinematography	Won
2018	Bad Times at the El Royale	Best Cinematography	Nominated
2021	Cyrano	Best Cinematography	Nominated
2025	Die My Love	Best Cinematography	Nominated

Evening Standard British Film Awards

Year	Title	Category	Result
2002	The Hours	Technical Achievement Award	Won
2007	Atonement	Technical Achievement Award	Won
2012	Anna Karenina	Technical Achievement Award	Won

IFTA Film & Drama Awards

Year	Title	Category	Result
2005	Sahara	Best Cinematography	Won
2007	Atonement	Best Cinematography	Won
2011	We Need to Talk About Kevin	Best Cinematography	Won
2012	Anna Karenina	Best Cinematography	Won
2016	Nocturnal Animals	Best Cinematography	Won
2017	The Greatest Showman	Best Cinematography	Won

Other awards

Year	Award	Category	Title	Result
1995	Royal Television Society	Cinematography Award	Skin	Nominated
2004	Royal Photographic Society	Lumiere Medal		Won
2007	Chicago Film Critics Association	Best Cinematography	Atonement	Nominated
2007	Houston Film Critics Society	Best Cinematography	Atonement	Nominated
2007	Online Film Critics Society	Best Cinematography	Atonement	Nominated
2007	St. Louis Gateway Film Critics Association	Best Cinematography	Atonement	Nominated
2011	British Independent Film Awards	Best Technical Achievement	We Need to Talk About Kevin	Nominated
2025	British Independent Film Awards	Best Cinematography	Die My Love	Won https://www.bifa.film/awards/2025/winners-nominations/
2012	Satellite Awards	Best Cinematography	Anna Karenina	Nominated
2016	Critics Choice Association	Best Cinematography	Nocturnal Animals	Nominated
2016	Houston Film Critics Society	Best Cinematography	Nocturnal Animals	Nominated
2016	San Diego Film Critics Society	Best Cinematography	Nocturnal Animals	Nominated
2016	Washington D.C. Area Film Critics Association	Best Cinematography	Nocturnal Animals	Nominated

== See also ==
- List of Academy Award winners and nominees from Great Britain
- List of Academy Award winners and nominees from Ireland
