= Ashley Scott-Layton =

British writer and director (born 1987)

Ashley Scott-Layton (born 13 November 1987 in Hertfordshire) is a British writer and director. He was the winner of The Directors Guild Award in 2010 and resident director on The Curious Incident of the Dog in the Night-Time. during its run at the Apollo Theatre

He studied at Leeds University where he founded Ravenrock Theatre Company whose members included Kate Phillips and Grace Savage. His production of 'Phaedra's Love' by Sarah Kane was invited to The National Student Drama Festival where Layton won the Directors Guild Award. Following graduation Layton took on resident director positions at Lyric Hammersmith and The National Theatre later becoming the resident director The Curious Incident of the Dog in the Night-Time during its run at the Apollo Theatre.

His work as a playwright includes The Nymph at Lyric Hammersmith Studio, A/Girl at the Oval House Theatre and Charlie Cumcup at the Edinburgh Festival. He often collaborates with the controversial dramatist G.G.Lolock
