= Skin (1995 film) =

- Directed by: Vincent O'Connell
- Written by: Sarah Kane
- Starring: Ewen Bremner; Marcia Rose
- Production companies: Tapson/Steel Films for British Screen; Channel 4 Films
- Release date: October 1995
- Running time: 11 minutes
- Country: United Kingdom
- Language: English

Skin is an 11-minute short film directed by Vincent O'Connell and starring Ewen Bremner and Marcia Rose. Produced by Tapson/Steel Films for British Screen and Channel 4 Films (now Film4 Productions), it was filmed in September 1995. The screenplay was written in the summer of that year by British playwright Sarah Kane.

It was first screened at the London Film Festival in October 1995, and was later given its television debut on Channel 4 at 11.35pm on 17 June 1997. An original airtime of 9.40pm was pushed back after television executives became worried about the depiction of violence and racism in the film, Vincent O'Connell was nominated for a Golden Bear award in the category "Best Short Film" for the film at the 1996 Berlin International Film Festival.

The film's screenplay was only Kane's second work, written after her 1995 debut Blasted but before 1996's Phaedra's Love. The screenplay appears in the complete collection of Sarah Kane's work, Sarah Kane: Complete Plays, published in 2001 by Methuen.

Bremner and Rose, who had never met prior to making the film, became romantically involved during its shooting, and subsequently had a child together.

== Plot ==
Billy, a young skinhead, joins in a racist attack on a Black wedding party in Brixton, London, but then finds himself drawn to Marcia, a Black woman whose flat is visible from his window. He visits Marcia and the couple have sex. From this point, the power dynamic between the two begins to reverse: in separate scenes, she slaps his face repeatedly as he is tied to the bed, feeds him dog food, and scrubs off his tattoos with bleach, including one of the Union Flag. Finally, Marcia carves her name on Billy's back. Despite his pleas, she rejects him, finding solace with Kath, her flatmate, while Billy unsuccessfully attempts to overdose on drugs and is saved by Neville, a black man living in the same apartment building as him.

== Cast ==
- Ewen Bremner as Billy
- Marcia Rose as Marcia
- Agnieszka Liggett as Kath
- Yemi Ajibade as Neville
- Dave Atkins as Mother
- James Bannon as Terry
- Dominic Brunt as Martin
- Gregory Donaldson as Nick
