= ID2: Shadwell Army =

- Directed by: Joel Novoa
- Written by: Vincent O'Connell
- Produced by: Sally Hibbin; Patrick Cassavetti
- Starring: Simon Rivers; Linus Roache; Paul Popplewell; Christine Tremarco; Neil Pearson; Andy Rush; Lee Ross; Richard Graham; Perry Fenwick; Duncan Airlie James
- Music by: Freddy Sheinfeld
- Distributed by: Universal Pictures
- Release date: 12 August 2016
- Running time: 92 minutes
- Country: United Kingdom
- Language: English

ID2: Shadwell Army is a 2016 British football hooligan film made by Universal Pictures, directed by Joel Novoa, written by Vincent O'Connell and starring Simon Rivers, Linus Roache and Paul Popplewell. It is the sequel to the 1995 film I.D. and like its predecessor, it is set in the Shadwell area of London and follows a Muslim police officer who is sent undercover to infiltrate the hooligan gang connected to Shadwell Town Football club.

Lee Ross reprises his role as "Gumbo", where as both Perry Fenwick and Richard Graham return in minor roles as Eddie and Trevor. The film was shot entirely in East Yorkshire and, in particular, Kingston Upon Hull.

== Plot ==
Set twenty-one years after I.D., Mo, a young Muslim police officer in the Metropolitan Police is sent by Trevor to infiltrate the hooligan firm of Shadwell Town Football Club, who are reportedly fired up following the club's takeover by a wealthy Russian oligarch. Mo searches out Eddie, who has now retired and is working as a stand-up comedian in a pub run by former Shadwell player Gerry Edwards. Eddie warns Mo of the dangers of the Shadwell firm and warns him whatever happens he needs to be careful not to be drawn in like John was, warning him of the alcoholism, drug abuse, violence and racism that come with his assignment.

Mo begins attending The Rock pub (now called La Chien), where he becomes acquainted with some of Shadwell's hooligans, Nick, Danny Boy and Gumbo. Danny initially doesn't like Mo and gets angry when he loses a game of pool to him. Mo leaves the pub and makes his way towards the stadium, where he comes across a group of Bolton Wanderers fans. Without the fans noticing him, Mo runs into a wall several times to feign injury and returns to the pub. When Nick and Danny see what has happened to Mo, the Shadwell firm runs out of the pub and ambushes the Bolton fans, and Mo's performance in the fight means he becomes accepted by the firm.

Mo is introduced to Vinnie, who is one of the leaders of the firm. Mo attempts to follow Vinnie from the pub but is caught. Vinnie takes him back to his house, where Alison, his wife, makes them both dinner. Vinnie tells Mo that he is working for the special branch and is also undercover; he explains that he has been sent in to infiltrate a gang of far-right fanatics attached to the club that object to the building of a new mosque next to Shadwell's stadium. The firm travels to Amsterdam for Shadwell's Europa League first leg fixture with Tambuur SC. Whilst there, Andy, Danny, and Gumbo use prostitutes, and later in the pub Mo joins them in eating marijuana cakes which makes them intoxicated, causing them to fall asleep in the pub and miss the game. When they wake, they realise they have let Vinnie down and arrive in the middle of a fight with Dutch Police who are seen to be arresting Vinnie.

Mo returns to London and arrives at Vinnie's house to warn Alison of Vinnie's arrest; she then allows Mo to stay the night on the sofa. The next morning Vinnie returns, and Alison sends Mo out into the shed to hide, assuming Vinnie would assume they were cheating. She and tells him to wait there as Vinnie arrives with Dave, George and Hunt who are members of the English Defence League. A plan is divulged to place a bomb inside a local mosque; Hunt produces a homemade bomb that George realises is about to detonate. Vinnie runs out and places it in his shed, only for Mo to run out. Hunt holds a gun to Mo's head, but Vinnie tells him he is a Sikh and that he hates Muslims. Dave then offers Mo an opportunity to join their group, to which he accepts.

Shadwell will make it past Tambuur in their second leg and play away at Athletic Bilbao in the next round. As they arrive on the ferry, Danny Boy has become suspicious of Mo and accuses him of being a journalist, but none of the others agree, and Danny is eventually convinced of Mo's sincerity. As the group bunk down for the night in the ship's cabin, Gumbo tells Mo he knows he's a Policeman to which Mo admits. Gumbo says he won't tell anyone and goes back to sleep. When they arrive in Spain the next morning, the Bilbao hooligans meet them off the boat, and a brawl ensues.

Upon his return, Alison comes to Mo's boathouse, where he lives, and tells him he needs to get out. The pair have sex, but Mo tells her he plans to go through with his assignment. Dave meets with Kash, one of the Muslim leaders, and tells him that his mosque needs to take a hit if they plan on building another one. The plan is set to detonate a bomb at the mosque on the night of Shadwell's second leg game with Bilbao and use Mo to sneak it through the front door with a rucksack. As a precursor, Mo warns Gumbo and asks him to help him, to which Gumbo accepts. Mo meets Vinnie, Hunt, George, and Dave, and they place the bomb into his bag and tell him to go to the mosque with George following behind. After Mo leaves, Hunt states to Dave that he knows Mo is a policeman, to which Dave calls George and orders him to kill him once he has placed the bomb inside.

Mo arrives at the mosque and places the bomb in a hallway; as he is leaving, he is confronted by George, but before he can pull the trigger, Vinnie shoots him dead, saving Mo. As the pair looks for the bomb, it is revealed that Gumbo has picked up the bag and has taken it to The Kennel, whereby by now the game has ended. The bomb detonates, killing Gumbo and he is revealed on the news the next day as a lone wolf who detonated the bomb because of a dislike for Shadwell's Russian owner.

Mo joins Andy and Danny Boy to lay flowers outside the pub in memory of Gumbo, before later meeting up with Eddie at Gerry's pub. The pair have a drink to Gumbo's memory, and in the closing scene, Mo returns to the mosque dressed in traditional Islamic clothing.

== Cast ==
- Simon Rivers as Mo
- Linus Roache as Vinnie
- Paul Popplewell as Danny Boy
- Andy Rush as Nick
- Neil Pearson as Dave
- Benjamin Harris as George
- Lee Ross as Gumbo
- Christine Tremarco as Alison
- Sahid Ahmed as Kash
- Perry Fenwick as Eddie
- Richard Graham as Trevor
- Duncan Airlie James as Hunt
- Sylwia Kaczmarek as Irina
- Naveed Choudhury as Muhitar
- Tatiana Dufrey as Catriona
- Reece Dinsdale as John (stock footage in opening credits)
- David Schaal as Paul Funnell (stock footage in opening credits)
- Nick Bartlett as David Daley (stock footage in opening credits)
- Terry Cole as Puff (stock footage in opening credits)
- Nicholas Bailey as Mickey (stock footage in opening credits

== Development ==
Writer Vincent O'Connell stated when preparing to write the film that he had started the hooligan genre, but most other films that came after I.D. he had loathed. All prominent actors from the first film received an open invitation to be in the film. O'Connell says he could not have made the film without Gumbo and says that the character was the living, breathing heart of I.D. Reece Dinsdale who played lead character John in the 1995 film, announced on Twitter that he had been offered a part but stated "Sometimes it's best to let sleeping 'dogs' lie".

== Production ==
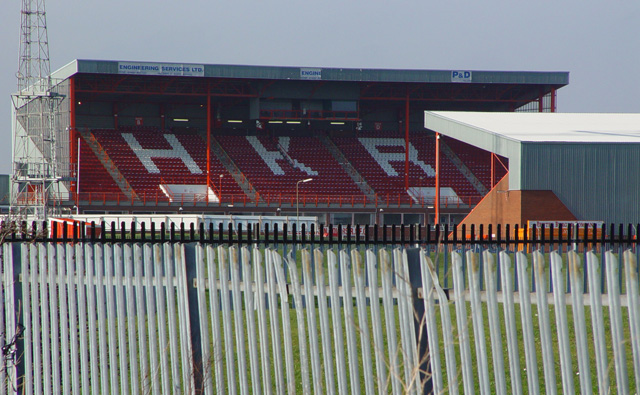
Craven Park the home of Hull Kingston Rovers was used as "The Kennel"

Despite some exterior shots of Shadwell station being used, filming took place entirely in East Yorkshire in particularly Kingston upon Hull, with some minor scenes being shot in the nearby town of Beverley. Craven Park the home of Rugby League side Hull Kingston Rovers served as Shadwell Town's home ground "The Kennel", replacing the now derelict Millmoor in Rotherham which had been used in the previous film. Shots that were intended to be Amsterdam were filmed at Trinity Square in Hull. The pub used as "The Rock" in the original film was demolished shortly after filming, so the former Duke of Wellington in Hull was used, although the pub in the film was now called "La Chien".

== Release & Reception ==
ID2: Shadwell Army was released in the UK on 12 August 2016 to mixed reviews. Critics blamed a weak plot and the lack of links to the previous film for its poor performance at the box office. However some critics such as David Parkinson of the Radio Times were more positive about the film writing:

"The sense of place is well established, while gritty performances by Roache and Pearson are ably complemented by Christine Tremarco and Perry Fenwick, as a neglected wife and a cop-turned-comedian."

In addition to this, Tom Huddleston of Time Out Magazine wrote:

"The plotting may be a little ropey, especially towards the end. But ‘ID2’ has smart things to say about identity and social class, and strides confidently through the minefield of British racial politics."
