= Christopher Fulford =

British actor

- Born: 1955 (age 70–71); London, England
- Occupation: Actor
- Years active: 1981–present
- Spouse: Camille Coduri (m. 1992)
- Children: 2

Christopher Fulford (born 1955) is a British actor who is best known for his supporting roles in many British TV shows, one of the earliest being punk Alex in the short lived sitcom Sorry, I'm a Stranger Here Myself (1981–82).

== Career ==
Fulford was born in London. In his early career he often appeared in British crime dramas, appearing in both the ITV crime series Inspector Morse episode "Driven to Distraction" (1990) and as a killer in the early A Touch of Frost episode "Widows and Orphans" (1994). He played the role of Kaspar Van Beethoven in the movie Immortal Beloved (1994). In 1993, Fulford starred in the BBC adaptation of Scarlet and Black alongside the virtually unknown Ewan McGregor and Rachel Weisz. He appeared as a vigilante in Dalziel & Pascoe, a corrupt ex-footballer in The Fix, and Mr. Hunter in the TV series Hornblower.

Fulford was featured as the murderer in the Hollywood film D-Tox (2002, with Sylvester Stallone) and starred as the sadistic schoolmaster Metcalf in the 2002 TV adaptation of Goodbye Mr Chips. He appeared in Millions (2004) and Pierrepoint (2005) and the television dramas The Last Train and Deceit. He has also appeared extensively on British television, appearing in guest roles in many episodes of series such as Inspector Morse, Cracker, Prime Suspect, Midsomer Murders, Dalziel and Pascoe, Murphy's Law (fifth series), Wire in the Blood (episode "Right to Silence"), Spooks, Judge John Deed, Waking the Dead and The Brief. Fulford appeared in the ITV1 dramas Whitechapel and Collision, both alongside Phil Davis. He played a suicidal Prime Minister in the British TV series The Last Enemy and appeared in Crave for the 'Sarah Kane Season' in Sheffield.

== Personal life ==
Christopher married actress Camille Coduri in 1992. They have two children, Rosa (born 1993) and Santino (born 1996).

== Partial filmography ==
=== Film ===
Year	Title	Role	Notes
1983	The Ploughman's Lunch	Young Journalist	
1985	Wetherby	Arthur	
1987	A Prayer for the Dying	Billy Meehan	
1987	Body Contact	Peter	
1989	Resurrected	Slaven	
1990	Mountains of the Moon	Herne	
1994	Immortal Beloved	Kaspar Anton Carl van Beethoven	
1998	Bedrooms and Hallways	Adam	
2000	One of the Hollywood Ten	Riffkind	
2001	Hotel	Steve Hawk	
2002	D-Tox	Slater	
2004	The Aryan Couple	Edelheim	
2004	Millions	The Man	
2005	Pierrepoint	Sykes	
2006	Joyeux Noël	Le Major Ecossais	
2006	Scoop	Strombel's Co-Workers	
2010	You Will Meet a Tall Dark Stranger	Ray's Friend	
2010	Pelican Blood	DC Thomas	
2012	Bel Ami	Police Commissioner	
2012	Tower Block	Kevin	
2014	Stonehearst Asylum	Paxton	
2015	Queen of the Desert	Winston Churchill	
2018	The Guardian Angel	Thuesen	
2019	Burning Men	Lenny	
2025	28 Years Later	Sam	
2026	Ink	Frank	

=== Television ===
Year	Title	Role	Note
1981–1982	Sorry, I'm a Stranger Here Myself	Alex	13 episodes
1983	A Married Man	Terry Pike	3 episodes
1983	Tales of the Unexpected	Bill	Episode: "Down Among the Sheltering Palms"
1983	Made in Britain	P.C. Anson	TV movie
1984	Minder	Billy	Episode: "A Well Fashioned Fit-Up"
1984	Play for Today	Billy	Episode: "Under the Hammer"
1985	Juliet Bravo	Cpl. Tom Warren	Episode: "Turbulence"
1985	We'll Support You Evermore	David Hollins	TV movie
1986	Boon	Andy	Episode: "Answers to the Name of Watson"
1986	The Fourth Floor	Det. John Miller	3 episodes
1988	Jack the Ripper	Beggar / Sergeant Brent	2 episodes (mini series)
1988	King and Castle	Det Sgt. Ryder	Episode: "Kicks"
1990	Inspector Morse	Tim Ablett	Episode: "Driven to Distraction"
1990	Mistress of Suspense	Dusenberry	Episode: "A Bird Poised to Fly"
1990	Screen One	Tony Lash	Episode: "News Hounds"
1991	4 Play	Alan Trent	Episode: "Itch"
1991	The Ruth Rendell Mysteries	Dudley Drury	2 episodes
1992	Lovejoy	Derek Rudge	Episode: "Smoke Your Nose"
1993	Comics	Nigel Perfect	1 episode
1993	Cracker	Nigel Cassidy	2 episodes
1993	Scarlet and Black	Napoleon	3 episodes
1993	ScreenPlay	First Surveillance Man	Episode: "The Vision Thing"
1994	99-1	Tate	2 episodes
1994	A Touch of Frost	Ronald Gould	Episode: "Widows and Orphans"
1995	The Ghostbusters of East Finchley	Frankie Pullen	6 episodes
1995	Prime Suspect	DCI Tom Mitchell	Episode: "The Scent of Darkness"
1996	The Fortunes and Misfortunes of Moll Flanders	Daniel Dawkins	1 episode
1996	Screen Two	George	Episode: "Bad Boy Blues"
1996	The Sculptress	Hal Hawksley	4 episodes (mini series)
1997	The Fix	Jimmy Gould	TV movie
1999	Hornblower	M'Man Hunter	Episode: "The Duchess and the Devil"
1999	The Last Train	Ian Hart	6 episodes (mini series)
2000	Deceit	Jack Crawford	2 episodes (mini series)
2001	The Mists of Avalon	Lot	2 episodes (mini series)
2002	Spooks	Jonny Marks	Episode: "One Last Dance"
2002	Goodbye Mr Chips	Metcalf	TV movie
2002–2013	Silent Witness	Nick Connors / DCC Tony Warren	4 episodes
2003	Burn It	Rory	1 episode
2003	Servants	Jarvis	6 episodes
2003	Wire in the Blood	Gary Cochran	Episode: "Right to Silence"
2004–2005	The Brief	Ray Scanlon	8 episodes
2005	The Golden Hour	Jack Dean	1 episode
2006	Dalziel and Pascoe	Terry Parker	2 episodes
2006	Hotel Babylon	John Boyack	1 episode
2007	The Commander	Denny Wade	Episode: "Windows of the Soul"
2007	Murphy's Law	Mark Baker	3 episodes
2008	The Last Enemy	George Gibbon	4 episodes (mini series)
2008	Waking the Dead	Josh Findlay	2 episodes
2009	Collison	DCI Stephen Maitland	4 episodes
2009	Midsomer Murders	Alan Best	Episode: "The Black Book"
2009	New Tricks	Barry Lestade	Episode: "Meat is Murder"
2009–2010	Whitechapel	DC Leo Fitzgerald	5 episodes
2010	Jack Taylor	Mason	2 episodes
2010	Survivors	Henry Smithson	2 episodes
2012	Him & Her	Pete	1 episode
2012	Twenty Twelve	Commander Bob Burford	Episode: "Castrophisation"
2013	By Any Means	Keith Brooks	1 episode (mini series)
2013	Foyle's War	Det Supt. Cranborne	Episode: "The Enternity Ring"
2013	The Guilty	Tom Rose	2 episodes
2013	Life of Crime	Furlong	Episode: "2013"
2013	Jo	Michel Melvillee	Episode: "Place de la Concorde"
2014	Law and Order: UK	Micky Belker	Episode: "Flaw"
2014	Pramface	Dave	Episode: "Tinker, Tailor, Lobster"
2015	The Musketeers	Gus	Episode: "An Ordinary Man"
2017	Grantchester	Eric Garston	1 episode
2017	Elvis Jones	Danny Fisher	Episode: "Suspicious Minds"
2018	Dark Heart	Bob Jessop	Episode: "Suffer the Children, Part 2"
2019	A Confession	John Godden	4 episodes
2019	Manhunt	DI Matthew Marjoram	2 episodes
2022	Screw	Dolby	1 episode
2022–2023	Top Boy	Wilson Lee	8 episodes
2025	Lynley	Dave Parsons	Episode: "Careless in Red"
