= 19;29 Performance =

Theatre company in London, UK

19;29 was a London-based theatre company who specialised in making work in undiscovered or under-explored sites, interrogating the atmosphere and heritage of these spaces and making performances in response to them.

The company was formed in 2005 by Artistic Directors Felix Mortimer and Susanna Davies-Crook.

== Past productions ==
- Threshold (2010)

A series of projects which investigated the telling and retellings of the Bluebeard myth, this included a film made jointly with Unthank Films, a Museum in Stroud Green, A radio play and A live piece at Traquair House

- HALL (2009)

An exploration of power and choice at Hornsey Town Hall, North London.

- Experiment 1 (2009)

An exploration of the Orpheus myth at Clyde Road Depot in North London.

- Blasted (2008)

19;29's adaptation of Sarah Kane's seminal 1995 play Blasted premiered at The Mosser Hotel in San Francisco on 19 June 2008. The US production was held in association with Exit Theatre.

- Blasted (2008)

This adaptation of Sarah Kane's play Blasted was performed in the Queens Hotel in Leeds in conjunction with the West Yorkshire Playhouse The Guardian's theatre critic Lyn Gardner called the production an "inspired idea" and it formed part of a national debate about subversion of theatrical space, which culminated in artistic director Felix Mortimer responding in The Guardian. The production ran in February 2008.

- Lazarus (2007)

This site-specific promenade piece encompassed three locations. The action began in St George's Field cemetery, and ended at DN:10 Railway Arches beneath Leeds railway station. Audiences were transported between the locations by doubledecker bus. The play was a hybrid of Henrik Ibsen's Hedda Gabler and the life of Sylvia Plath. The production ran in March 2007.

- Dr Faustus (2006)

This adaptation of Christopher Marlowe's play The Tragical History of Doctor Faustus was performed in the oak lined Special Collections room at the University of Leeds's Brotherton Library in England. The production ran in May 2006.
