= Justin Kerrigan =

British film director and screenwriter

Justin Kerrigan (born 1973) is a Welsh writer from Cardiff, best known for directing and writing the 1999 film Human Traffic.

== About ==
Born in Cardiff, Kerrigan attended Cantonian High School and then Newport Film School (formerly part of the University of Wales, Newport, now the University of South Wales) His film credits include I Know You Know & Human Traffic.

== Filmography ==
=== Film ===
Year	Film	Producer	Director	Writer
1995	Party Politics	Yes	Yes	Yes
1996	Life in a Buslane	Yes	Yes	Yes
1996	Pubroom Paranoia	Yes	Yes	Yes
1999	Human Traffic	Yes	Yes	Yes
2008	I Know You Know	Yes	Yes	Yes
