= Perry Fenwick =

English actor (born 1962)

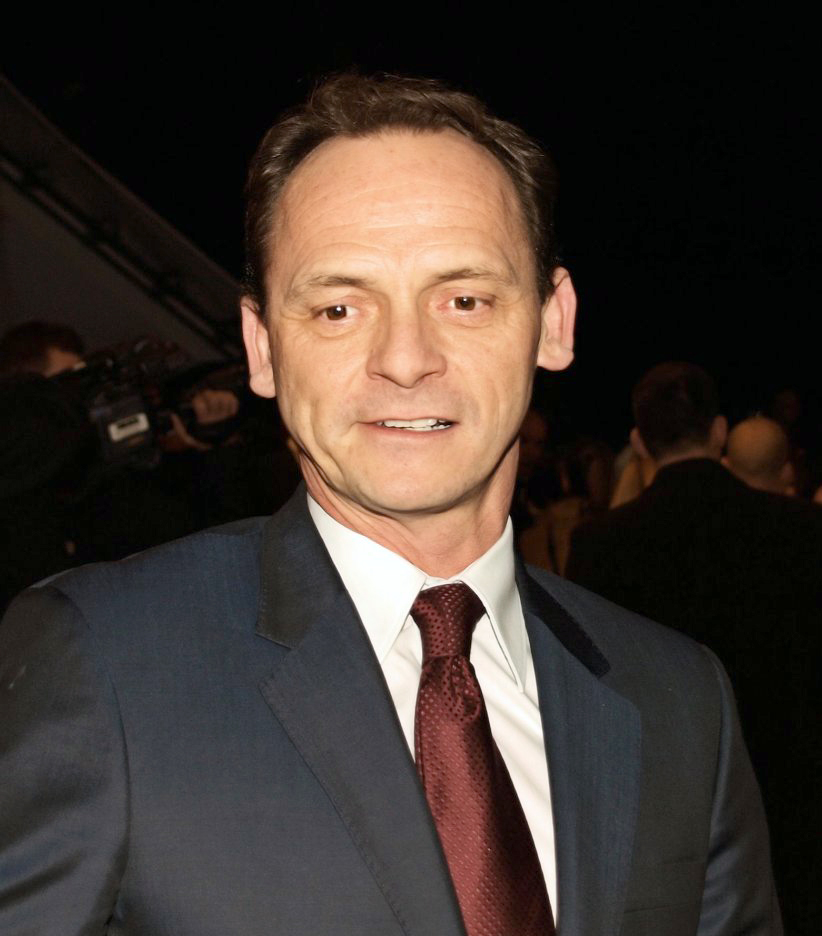
- Fenwick in 2010
- Born: 29 May 1962 (age 64); Canning Town, Newham, England
- Occupation: Actor
- Years active: 1980–present
- Spouse: Angela Lonsdale (m. 2005; sep. 2010)
- Children: 3
- Relatives: Georgina Hagen (second cousin)

Perry Fenwick (born 29 May 1962) is an English actor. He is known for playing Billy Mitchell in the BBC soap opera EastEnders, a role which he has played since 1998.

== Early life ==
Fenwick was born on 29 May 1962 in Canning Town, a suburb in the West Ham district of the Newham borough of East London. He has one sister, Tracey, and two brothers, Faron and Lee. He is also the second cousin of Georgina Hagen.

== Career ==
=== Television ===
Fenwick's first regular television role was in the sitcom Watching. He has also appeared in Inspector Morse, The Brittas Empire, Minder, On the Up, The Thin Blue Line, London's Burning and Bergerac. He appeared in the long-running ITV police drama series The Bill five times, playing a different minor character each time.

Fenwick's film credits include Party Party, Mona Lisa, Empire State, The Raggedy Rawney, I.D., The Tichborne Claimant, Janice Beard 45 WPM, The Winslow Boy, G:MT – Greenwich Mean Time and ID2: Shadwell Army. In 1998, Fenwick was cast in the role of Billy Mitchell in EastEnders.

== Personal life ==
Fenwick married former Coronation Street actress Angela Lonsdale, but in February 2010, it was announced that the couple were to separate.

== Filmography ==
=== Film ===
Year	Title	Role
1983	Party Party	Larry
1986	Mona Lisa	Pimp
1987	Empire State	Darren
1988	The Raggedy Rawney	Victor
1990	Crimestrike	Nitro
1995	I.D.	Eddie
1998	The Tichborne Claimant	John Holmes
1999	The Winslow Boy	Fred
1999	Janice Beard 45 WPM	Mr. Button
1999	G:MT – Greenwich Mean Time	Ant
2016	ID2: Shadwell Army	Eddie

== Awards and nominations ==
Year	Award	Category	Result	Ref.
2000	6th National Television Awards	Most Popular Newcomer	Nominated	
2002	The British Soap Awards	Best Actor	Nominated	
2002	8th National Television Awards	Most Popular Actor	Nominated	
2003	British Soap Awards	Best Actor	Nominated	
2005	11th National Television Awards	Most Popular Actor	Nominated	
2005	TVQuick & TVChoice Awards	Best Soap Actor	Nominated	
2006	12th National Television Awards	Most Popular Actor	Nominated	
2007	British Soap Awards	Best Actor	Nominated	
2013	TV Choice Awards	Best Soap Actor	Nominated	
2013	British Soap Awards	Best Actor	Nominated	
