= Deceit (2004 film) =

2004 American television film

- Based on: Deceit by Clare Francis
- Teleplay by: John Sacret Young
- Directed by: John Sacret Young
- Starring: Marlo Thomas; Vondie Curtis-Hall; Brett Cullen; Emily Barclay; Louis Corbett; William Devane; Catherine Boniface; Andrew Robertt; Rebecca Hobbs; Tim Balme; Kama Brown; Darien Takle; David Stott; Owen Black; Blair Strang
- Music by: David Hamilton
- Country of origin: United States
- Original language: English

Production
- Producer: Steve Sachs
- Cinematography: Johnny E. Jensen
- Editor: Christopher Nelson
- Running time: 91 minutes
- Production companies: Open Road Productions; Samoset Productions; Sony Pictures Television

Original release
- Network: Lifetime
- Release: March 15, 2004

Deceit is a 2004 American television movie adapted from the 2000 British television serial of the same name. Marlo Thomas, the film's leading actress, also served as executive producer. This crime film follows Ellen McCarthy (Thomas) in her attempt to determine the circumstances of her rich husband's disappearance at sea. It was first broadcast on March 15, 2004 by Lifetime Television.
