= I Know You Know =

- Film poster
- Directed by: Justin Kerrigan
- Written by: Justin Kerrigan
- Produced by: Sally Hibbin; Michael Reuter
- Starring: Robert Carlyle; Arron Fuller; David Bradley; Karl Johnson
- Cinematography: Ed Wild
- Edited by: Stuart Gazzard
- Music by: Guy Farley
- Release dates: October 2008 (BFI London Film Festival); 4 December 2009
- Running time: 81 minutes
- Country: United Kingdom
- Language: English

I Know You Know is a 2008 feature film written and directed by Justin Kerrigan, his first major work since his debut with Human Traffic in 1999.

The film is about a young boy who becomes involved with his father's espionage work. His father wants to finish one more job before they can both move to a better life in America. However, things do not go to plan.

This movie was filmed in Wales and many other locations within the United Kingdom.

== Cast ==
- Robert Carlyle - Charlie
- Arron Fuller - Jamie
- David Bradley - Mr Fisher
- Karl Johnson - Ernie
- Howard Marks - Jack
- Ross O'Hennessy as The Desk Sgt.
- Ryan Spriggs as Annoying Bully
- Christian Patterson as Policeman John
- Daniel Shane Flynn as Bully Dean
