= Lee Ross (actor) =

English actor (born 1971)

Lee Ross (born 1971) is an English actor known for his roles as Kenny Phillips in the CITV dramedy Press Gang and as Owen Turner in the BBC soap opera EastEnders. He is also known for his debut role as Dodger in the drama series Dodger, Bonzo and the Rest, Secrets & Lies, The Catherine Tate Show and BBC sitcom White Gold.

== Education ==
Lee Ross attended Stockwood High School, Luton.

== Career ==
Ross first appeared on British television in 1983 as one of the children in a Colgate commercial which featured a parody of the hit Madness song Baggy Trousers.

His first acting role was as Fat Sam in Micky Dolenz' West End production of Bugsy Malone. He went on to play Dodger in the TV series Dodger, Bonzo and the Rest, which was a spin-off from the series Dramarama. The series ran from 1985 till 1986. He next played Kenny Phillips in Press Gang from 1989 to 1991.

Ross had lead roles in two films in 1990, playing Bryan in Amongst Barbarians and Phil in Sweet Nothing. He also had small roles in Buddy's Song in 1990, playing Jason, and in the 1999 film Rogue Trader, playing Danny.

He had another lead role in the movie Hard Men playing the part of a gangster and in 1995 he played Gumbo in the film I.D.

In 1991 he played Justin Parrish, the son of Jim Broadbent's character, in Work!. In 1992 and 1993 he had roles in The Guilty, Between the Lines, Casualty, Westbeach, The Bill and The Upper Hand. He had many more roles in the late 1990s including Trial & Retribution

Ross played Paul, the boyfriend of Roxanne, in the 1996 Mike Leigh film Secrets & Lies. He provided the voice for Hawkbit in all three of the 1999 Watership Down television series.

He has appeared on The Catherine Tate Show in many sketches, working alongside Catherine Tate and Niky Wardley. He has also had many guest roles in a variety of television shows, including Waking the Dead, Hustle, Jericho, M.I.T.: Murder Investigation Team and recurring roles in Mutual Friends and Life on Mars/Ashes to Ashes.

In 2018, Ross starred as retired drag queen Hugo Battersby / Loco Chanelle in the West End musical Everybody's Talking About Jamie. He also appeared in South Pacific in 2022.

Ross has appeared in several productions at the Royal Court Theatre. He appeared in Birdsong at the Comedy Theatre in 2010.

== Filmography ==
=== Film ===
Year	Film	Role	Notes
1990	Amongst Barbarians	Bryan	
1991	Buddy's Song	Jason	
1992	Life's a Gas		Short film
1994	The Crane	Young Man 2	
1995	I.D.	Gumbo	
1995	The Hurting	Bull	
1996	Black Eyes	Tony	
1996	Secrets & Lies	Paul	
1996	Hard Men	Speed	
1996	The English Patient	Spalding	
1997	Metroland	Toni Barbarowski	
1997	The Island on Bird Street	Freddy	
1998	Vigo	Oscar Levy	
1999	Five Seconds to Spare		
1999	Dropouts		
1999	Rogue Trader	Danny Argyropoulos	
1999	Dreaming of Joseph Lees	Harry	
2000	Jump	Willy	
2000	Secret Society	Ken	
2004	Billy's Day Out	Dave	
2005	Goal!	Bluto	
2009	Origin	Jimmy Holmes	Post-production
2010	Centurion	Septus	
2013	Locke	PC Davids	voice
2014	Dawn of the Planet of the Apes	Grey	motion capture
2015	Containment	Mark	
2016	ID2: Shadwell Army	Gumbo	
2016	Dusty and Me	Bill	
2017	Bikini Blue	Sergeant Daldry	
2018	Farming	Jack Carpenter	
2021	A Castle for Christmas	Thomas	

=== Television ===
Year	Show	Role	Notes
1984	Dramarama	Dodger	1 episode: "Dodger, Bonzo and the Rest"
1985–1986	Dodger, Bonzo and the Rest	Dodger	Series regular
1989–1991	Press Gang	Kenny Phillips	Series regular
1990	Sweet Nothing	Phil	
1991	Work!	Justin Parrish	
1991	The Bill	Mace	1 episode: "Stress Rules"
1991	Shrinks	Paul Carter	1 episode: "1.6"
1992	The Guilty	Tommy	
1992	Between the Lines	Michael Brandell	1 episode: "Out of the Game"
1992	Casualty	Dave	1 episode: "Money Talks"
1993	Westbeach	Chris Cromer	Recurring
1993	The Bill	Neil Simpson	1 episode: "Trust"
1993	The Upper Hand	Gary Grant	1 episode: "The Price Is Right"
1995	Shine on Harvey Moon	Roy	Recurring
1996	Casualty	Ray	1 episode: "Land of Hopes"
1997	Trial & Retribution	Peter James	2 episodes: "1.1" and "1.2"
1998	Only Love	Technician	
1999	Playing the Field	Ryan Pratt	Recurring from Episode "2.1" to "4.3"
1999	Dockers	Andy Walton	
1999	Tube Tales	Male Reveller	
1999	Watership Down	Hawkbit (voice)	39 episode television series
2001	Waking the Dead	Christopher Redford	2 episodes: "Every Breath You Take" (parts 1 & 2)
2003	Where the Heart Is	Gary Frasier	1 episode: "The Need of You"
2004	Dunkirk	Sgt Moore	
2004	Hustle	Ray Fordham	1 episode: "The Last Gamble"
2004–2007	The Catherine Tate Show	Paul	Series regular
2005	M.I.T.: Murder Investigation Team	Andy Nash	1 episode: "2.4"
2005	Jericho	Louis	4 part series
2006	Life on Mars	DCI Litton	2 episodes: "1.3" and "1.6"
2006	The Family Man	Gary	
2006	Mutual Friends	Harry Seed	6 part series; recurring
2009	Moses Jones	Mick Mahoney	3 part series; recurring
2007 & 2009	Robin Hood	Sir Jasper	2 episodes: "Walkabout" and "Total Eclipse"
2006 & 2009	EastEnders	Owen Turner	Series regular
2010	The Persuasionists	Cockney Jim	1 episode: "Cockney Cheese"
2010	Ashes to Ashes	DCI Litton	1 episode: "3.5"
2011	Doctor Who	Boatswain	1 episode: "The Curse of the Black Spot"
2011	Coming Up	Jim	1 episode: "Geronimo"
2011	Midsomer Murders	Sergeant Trevor Gibson	1 episode: "The Sleeper Under the Hill"
2012	Titanic	Barnes	4-part series
2012	Flikken Maastricht	IRA killer Gerry Utters (better known as Bran Collins)	Dutch police drama
2014	The Driver	Kev Mitchell	3-part series
2017	Silent Witness	Tommy McAteer	Episode: "Covenant"
2017	White Gold	Ronnie Farrell	
2017	STAR	Buddy Bruce	
2018	Farming	Jack	
2021	Andor	Kloris	Episode 4, 5

=== Video games ===
Year	Show	Role	Notes
2020	Watch Dogs: Legion	Nigel Cass	Voice
