= Richard Graham (actor) =

English actor

- Born: 10 May 1960 (age 65); Farnborough, Kent, England
- Occupation: Actor
- Years active: 1983–present
- Spouse: Yvonne Graham
- Children: 2

Richard Graham (born 10 May 1960) is an English actor. He played George T. Rowe in the 1997 film Titanic.

He has also appeared in In the Name of the Father (1993), Gangs of New York (2002) and Vera Drake (2004), as well as playing Trevor Clyner in football hooligan films ID (1995) and ID2: Shadwell Army (2016). He appeared in all 12 episodes of Maisie Raine as Mickey Farrel, and in 16 episodes of Hollyoaks as William Alexander. He has also appeared in Inspector Morse and Pie in the Sky. In 2019, he appeared in the BBC soap opera EastEnders as Jonno Highway, a role in which he reprised in September 2025.

== Filmography ==
=== Film ===
Year	Film	Role	Notes
1984	The Bounty	John Mills	
1985	My Beautiful Laundrette	Genghis	
1989	Return from the River Kwai	Sergeant Perry	
1989	Try This One for Size	First Security Guard	
1991	Under Suspicion	Denny	
1993	In the Name of the Father	Detective	
1995	ID	Trevor	
1997	Titanic	Quartermaster George T. Rowe	
2000	24 Hours in London	Novell	
2001	Happy Now	Bronwyn's Nurse	
2001	Arthur's Dyke	Andy	
2002	Gangs of New York	Harvey / Card Player	
2004	Vera Drake	George	
2005	Rug	Charles	Short film
2007	Cassandra's Dream	Detective	
2007	Breath	Alex	Short film
2008	The Other Man	Eric	
2010	The Kid	Fruit + Veg Trader	
2013	The World's End	Head Builder	
2013	Dom Hemingway	Prison Guard	
2014	The Right to Remain Silent	Detective / Narrator	Short film
2016	The Removal	Father	Short film
2016	ID2: Shadwell Army	Trevor Clyner	
2017	Phantom Thread	George Riley, News of the World	

=== Television ===
Year(s)	Title	Role	Notes
1983	Up the Elephant and Round the Castle	1st Son	Episode: "A Cuckoo in the Nest"
1985	Inside Out	Brian	5 episodes
1986	The Fourth Floor	Det. Jim Collins	3 episodes
1987	Bergerac	Kirk Barnett	Episode: "A Desiderable Little Residence"
1987	Boon	Mickey	Episode: "Texas Ranger"
1987	Home to Roost	Dusty Miller	Episode: "Paper Chase"
1988	King of Olympics: The Lifes and Loves of Avery Brundage	Reporter	Television film
1989–2007	The Bill	Various	5 episodes
1990	Forgotten Prisoners: The Amnesty Files	Turan	Television film
1990–1994	The Ruth Rendell Mysteries		6 episodes
1992	Van der Valk	Jan Malen	Episode: "Still Waters"
1992	Covington Cross	Sherwood	Episode: "The Trial"
1992	An Ungentlemanly Act	Cpl. Armour	Television film
1993	Inspector Morse	PC Cobbs	Episode: "The Day of the Devil"
1993	Olly's Prison	Olly	Television film
1993	Brian Conley: Outside Chance	Jake Brewer	Television film
1994–1995	Time After Time	Jake Brewer	7 episodes
1995	Kavanagh QC	Ray West	Episode: "Heartland"
1995	A Touch of Frost	Tony Walder	Episode: "Quarry"
1996	Pie in the Sky	DC Linney	Episode: "This Other Heaven"
1996	Thief Takers	Gil Rogers	Episode: "Whispers in the Dark"
1997	Hostile Waters	Belikov	Television film
1998–1999	Real Women	Pete	
1998–1999	Maisie Raine	D.S. Mickey Farrel	Main role
1999	The Passion	Michael	
1999	Bravo Two Zero	Mark	Television film
2000	Lock, Stock...	Toothless	Episode: "...and a Good Slopping Out"
2000	The Thing About Vince...	Bradshaw	Episode 2
2001	I Was a Rat	Charlie	3 episodes
2001	Silent Witness	Stephen Merchant	Episode: "Two Below Zero: 1"
2001, 2006	Heartbeat	Ray Dooley, Pete Atkins	2 episodes
2002–2003	Rockface	Mike Bayliss	7 episodes
2005	Down to Earth	Dave Sewell	Episode: "Changes"
2005	Holby City	Alan Delaney	Episode: "Love, Life and Loss"
2006	Doctors	Simon Tyson	Episode: "Home from Home"
2008	HolbyBlue	Kevin Watson	
2008	Midnight Man	Brian Makepeace	2 episodes
2008	Einstein and Eddington	Man with White Feather	Television film
2008, 2016	Midsomer Murders	Stanley Goodfellow Gerry Bleacher	“Talking to the Dead”, ”Breaking the Chain”
2009	My Family	Barry	Episode: "Bully for Ben"
2011	Hollyoaks	William 'Billy' Alexander	16 episodes
2011	New Tricks	Peter Offord	Episode: "End of the Line"
2012	Whitechapel	John Cobbett	2 episodes
2013	Blackout	Mark	Television film
2019, 2025	EastEnders	Jonno Highway	Guest role
