= James Hornsby School =

The James Hornsby School
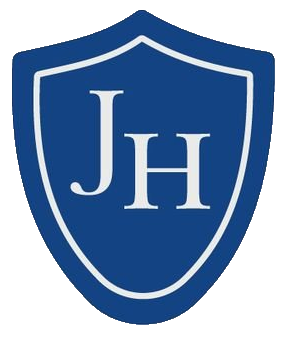

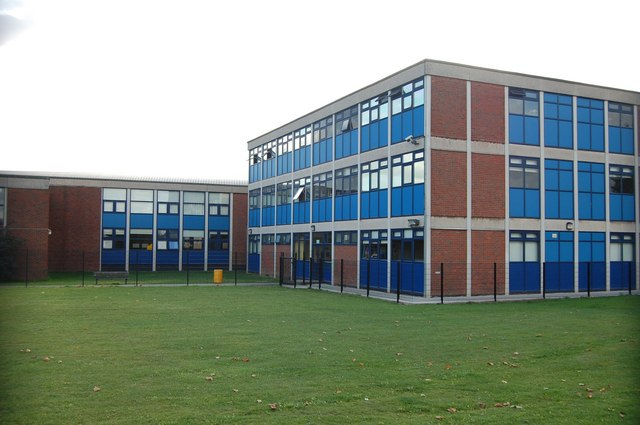

Location
- Leinster Road; Basildon, Essex, SS15 5NX; England; 51°34′33″N 0°25′50″E

Information
- Type: Academy
- Motto: Together We Excel
- Established: 1998 (by merger)
- Trust: Zenith Multi Academy Trust
- Department for Education URN: 138865 Tables
- Ofsted: Reports
- Headteacher: Tammy Nicholls
- Staff: 100+
- Gender: Co-educational
- Age: 11 to 16
- Enrolment: 1050
- Color
- Website: http://www.jameshornsby.essex.sch.uk/

The James Hornsby School is a co-educational secondary school located in Laindon, in the Borough of Basildon, Essex, England. It was formed from the merger in 1998 of the Laindon School and Nicholas Comprehensive, and occupies the site of the latter.

The name 'James Hornsby' comes from the name of the last headmaster who taught at the nearby St Nicholas's Church in the 19th century.

The school specialised and became James Hornsby High School Sports College by 2009 and became an academy in October 2012, changing the name to James Hornsby School. The school is also working with The King John School in South Benfleet.

== History ==
In 1928 the Laindon High Road County Senior School opened. In the late 1980s it was renamed The Laindon School In 1963 the Nicholas School opened, later to become Nicholas Comprehensive in September 1968.

In 1990 Nicholas became the first secondary in Basildon to be honoured with the Schools Curriculum Award and in 1993 the first to be inspected by Ofsted. Due to a stagnating student population in both schools the Essex County Council decided to amalgamate both schools and they closed in July 1998. After closure Laindon's campus hosted the new James Hornsby High School while the Nicholas campus was renovated. The James Hornsby school reopened on the Nicholas campus in September 2000 and the Laindon campus closed for the last time.

== Buildings ==
The school has two main buildings. The main three-storey building accommodates the English and media, science, mathematics and IT departments. The science laboratories had major refurbishment in 2010. The building also has a series of one-storey blocks which house the language, visual arts, PE, health and social care, music and dance departments. The reception, cafeteria, library and staff offices are also located in the main building.

The second building is the "Humanities Block". This also has a main three-storey block which accommodates the history, geography, RE, classical civilisations. The building also has another block within containing two IT rooms, drama, resistant materials, food technology, graphic design and public services departments. The "servery" is also located in this block as an alternative food vendor to the cafeteria.

A third building has been added to the campus, opened in October 2010.

The school has a sports hall, gymnasium, two performing arts studios, large assembly hall and a swimming pool. In July 2010, the sports hall underwent work to make a new corridor and extension which was completed in December 2010. The new extension has been designed to meet Disability Discrimination Act 2005 guidelines. The extension has two floors, the top floor acting as a further class room and observation room into the sports hall. On the lower floor there is a disabled toilet and another observation room for the swimming pool that can be hired out.

== Uniform ==
The uniform at James Hornsby was changed in September 2012 from blue blazers with yellow and blue ties to black blazers with the school's new logo and new school ties with one of four different colours (for each of the colleges) with black trousers and a white shirt.

== Subjects ==
All pupils study English, mathematics, science, PE and PSHRE (Personal, Social, Religious and Health Education).

Pupils in years 7, 8 and 9 also study modern languages, art, music, drama, catering, IT, materials tech, history and geography. These are offered as options in years 10 and 11, along with hair & beauty, child development, media, construction, business, photography, sociology and sports studies.

== Headteachers and deputy headteachers ==
=== Laindon School ===
==== Heads ====
- Mr. George Radford (1928-1949)
- Mr. Jack H.J. Woodward (1949-1962)
- Mr. W. Day (1963-1966)
- Mrs D. Clark (1966)
- Mr. Arthur H.J. Chadband (1967-1988)
- Mr. Newton (1988-1993)
- Mr. Brian Gillman (1993-1996)
- Mr. Michael Feehan (1997-1998)

==== Deputies ====
- Ms. Janet Duke (1933-1964, also Headmistress at Markham's Chase Primary renamed Janet Duke Primary in her memory)

=== Nicholas School ===
==== Heads ====
- Mr. John Goodier (1963-1970s)
- Mr. John Greener (1970s-1982)
- Mr. John Cooper (1982-1998)

==== Deputies ====
- Mrs. Coulthard (1963-1975)
- Mrs. Betty Barrett (1975-1979)
- Mrs. Giordan (1979-1983)
- Mr. Robin Lees (1983-1985)
- Mr. Ken Edwards (1985-1988)
- Ms. Christine Jeffries (1988-1998)

=== James Hornsby School ===
==== Heads ====
- Mrs. Jaqueline White (1998-2005)
- Ms. Gill Hillman/Mrs. Gill Thomas (2005-2010)
- Mr. Nick Feltimo (2010)
- Mr. Chris Hayes (2011-2012)
- Mr. Stuart Reynolds (2012-2013)
- Mrs. Margaret Wilson (Executive 2012-2018)
- Mr. Jason Carey (2013-2019)
- Mr. Daniel Steel (2019-2021)
- Mrs. Tammy Nicholls (2021–present)

==== Deputies ====
- Mr. Freeman (2015-2018)
- Mrs. Pip Frend, Mr. David Back and Mr. Simon Smith (2021–present)

== Notable former pupils ==
=== Nicholas School ===
Martin Gore and Andy Fletcher of electronic band Depeche Mode attended Nicholas Comprehensive and the band played their first gig there. Gore and Fletcher shared a class with Cure member Perry Bamonte and singer Alison Moyet. Nicholas was also attended by Bob The Builder and PAW Patrol creator, Keith Chapman, Screenwriter, Playwright and Director Vincent O'Connell and Conservative Member of Parliament for Rayleigh and Wickford, Mark Francois. From 2019 to 2024, the school was attended by several students, known locally as the “Box Lads,” one member of the group, Alfie Longworth, played football with Anton Ferdinand (the brother of Rio Ferdinand).

=== Laindon School ===
Depeche Mode member Vince Clarke went to Laindon School and later formed Yazoo with Nicholas Comprehensive's Alison Moyet.
