= Butterfly Kiss =

- Directed by: Michael Winterbottom
- Written by: Frank Cottrell Boyce; Michael Winterbottom
- Produced by: Julie Baines; Sarah Daniel
- Starring: Amanda Plummer; Saskia Reeves
- Cinematography: Seamus McGarvey
- Edited by: Trevor Waite
- Music by: John Harle
- Release date: 18 August 1995
- Running time: 88 minutes
- Country: United Kingdom
- Language: English
- Budget: £400,000
- Box office: £0.2 million

Butterfly Kiss (alternative title Killer on the Road) is a 1995 British film, directed by Michael Winterbottom and written by Frank Cottrell Boyce. It stars Amanda Plummer and Saskia Reeves. The film was entered into the 45th Berlin International Film Festival.

== Plot ==
Eunice, a bisexual serial killer, travels along the bleak motorways of Lancashire, searching filling stations for a mysterious woman named Judith and asking about finding a song that she vaguely remembers, always asking if the cashier's name is Judith. She does this at one and, after the cashier tells her her name is Wendy, not Judith, Eunice murders her, stealing her name badge.

After searching fruitlessly at another, she travels outside and douses herself with petrol. The cashier, Miriam, dashes out and offers her to stay for the night at her apartment, where she lives with her invalid grandmother; on their way Eunice shows Miriam a stack of letters she claims were written by Judith. At the apartment, Eunice strips off her clothes, revealing herself to be covered in chains, piercings and tattoos, reciting a religious poem as she undresses.

Eunice seduces Miriam, only to leave the following morning, writing "your not Judith" on her mirror in toothpaste. Eunice hitches a ride with a tradesman named Tony, whom she murders as they have sex, stealing his van. Miriam, abandoning her grandmother, catches up with Eunice by hitchhiking with Mr McDermott, a friendly customer of hers, joining her in the stolen van.

As the two arrive at a forest, Eunice reveals the corpse of Tony, Miriam offers to help her conceal the evidence, and drags the body out to bury it. Eunice abandons Miriam and goes to a nearby restaurant, leaving Miriam to deal with the corpse. At the diner she meets a waitress, Angela and invites her to sit at her table.

Eunice returns to Miriam, who, overcome to see her return, fawns over Eunice in gratitude. The two sleep in a stolen car and take off the following morning, after Miriam finds Eunice walking along the beach. As they eat breakfast at a filling station café, Eunice attempts to stop Miriam from following her, commanding her to go home, though Miriam refuses.

At the filling station, they pick up two hitchhikers, Gary and his 12-year-old daughter, Katie, on their way to Morecambe. On their way, Eunice takes a detour to an amusement park. Whilst Eunice is away from the car, Miriam discovers the body of Angela in the boot and refuses to allow Gary and Katie to travel any further with them. As they are about to leave the park, Eunice spots Katie sitting alone and orders Miriam to find Gary. When Miriam and Gary arrive, they find Eunice standing by the car alone. She tells Gary that Katie went off to find him, sending him away in turn. As Eunice and Miriam travel away, Miriam sits in silence, believing she has murdered Katie. Katie then pops up in the back seat, frightening Miriam. Miriam forces Eunice to pull over and leaves Katie by the side of the road, telling her to find someone to take her back to the park. On a bridge over the motorway, Eunice explains that she could not kill Katie only because Katie refused to look at her; she curses God for having forgotten her and allowing her to get away with such horrific crimes. To comfort her, Miriam assures her that she will stay with her and do all she can to make her a better person; Eunice coldly tells her it is impossible.

As they come to a truck stop, they get rid of the stolen car and meet a philosophical truck driver named Robert with whom Eunice strikes up a conversation. After making a light-hearted joke at her expense, Eunice invites Robert to have sex with the two of them, putting forward Miriam. Miriam is hesitant, but Eunice orders her to do what she says, disappearing into the night. As Robert begins to have sex with Miriam, Eunice, hearing Miriam's cries, returns and bludgeons Robert to death with a stolen headlight, stealing his lorry. At the next filling station, Eunice asks, as normal, if the cashier's name is Judith, when she says that it is, Eunice kisses her. The woman throws her off in shock, stating that she has no idea who Eunice is. Eunice flies into a rage, just as Miriam intervenes and removes her from the shop.

Miriam negotiates a ride with Mr McDermott and as they go with him, Eunice begins to throw his time share tickets (a petrol station incentive) out the window, stating that he needs to be punished. Mr McDermott, revealing himself to be a masochist, agrees with her. Mr McDermott checks the three of them into a hotel room and, whilst Miriam is out getting food, begins to have sex with Eunice. When Miriam returns, she sees the two of them in the shower and, believing that McDermott is raping Eunice, beats him to death with the shower hose. Eunice calmly states that now they are both in hell. In the car as they flee, Eunice torments Miriam over what she has done, telling her that her life is over. Miriam tears up and changes the subject by identifying the song that Eunice had been looking for, "World In Motion" which she had misremembered as a love song (Miriam had heard the song playing in the grocery shop). Miriam asks Eunice what she wanted to do once she found Judith to which Eunice tells her that she wanted to make Judith into a religious sacrifice.

As they stop the car in a remote area, Eunice tells Miriam that she wants to become the sacrifice herself as this is the only way she can avoid hell. Stripping off, Miriam begins to remove the chains which Eunice wears as 'her punishment'. As the sun rises the following morning, the two travel down to the beach where Eunice recites the bible as they march out to the sea. As the tide comes in, Eunice orders Miriam to force her head under the water, to drown her. The film closes as Miriam cradles the body of Eunice in a Pieta pose, sobbing in the midst of the rising sea.

== Cast ==
- Amanda Plummer as Eunice: A violent, bisexual psychopath, she is promiscuous, readily seducing both men and women, whilst adhering to an idiosyncratic form of Christianity, frequently reciting biblical quotes and religious poetry. She carries a stack of letters purported to be from "Judith", who she represents with an image of the biblical character.
- Saskia Reeves as Miriam: An unintelligent, partially deaf woman who works at a petrol station, she encounters Eunice as she asks after Judith. She lives with her housebound grandmother and, being starved of love, becomes infatuated with Eunice after she is seduced. She is optimistic about people and their inherent goodness, her good nature and low intelligence making her especially vulnerable to Eunice's manipulation. The viewer is led to believe that after the events of the film, Miriam was arrested, as the film is interspersed with black and white footage of her speaking about her relationship with Eunice, as if in a police interrogation, which shows her to be an unreliable narrator.
- Kathy Jamieson as Wendy: A woman who works at a petrol station, she is murdered by Eunice at the beginning of the film when she cannot help her find Judith.
- Des McAleer as Eric McDermott: A Masochistic petrol customer of Miriam's and a travelling vacuum salesman.
- Lisa Riley as Danielle
- Freda Dowie as Elsie: Miriam's elderly, housebound grandmother
- Paula Tilbrook as Ella: A woman who works with Miriam at the filling station.
- Fine Time Fontayne as Tony: A tradesman murdered by Eunice
- Joanne Cook as Angela: A waitress who is murdered by Eunice
- Elizabeth McGrath as Waitress
- Shirley Vaughan as Waitress
- Paul Bown as Gary: A hitchhiker who travels with Eunice and Miriam
- Emily Aston as Katie: Gary's twelve-year-old daughter, Eunice kidnaps her briefly.
- Ricky Tomlinson as Robert: A philosophically minded lorry driver, he is murdered by Eunice after Eunice manipulates Miriam into having sex with him.
- Katy Murphy as Judith: A woman who shares the same name as the object of Eunice's search.

== Soundtrack ==
- "Walkin' Back to Happiness" Helen Shapiro
- "I Will Survive" Gloria Gaynor
- "Ridiculous Thoughts" The Cranberries
- "You Won't Find Another Fool Like Me" The New Seekers
- "Silly Games" Janet Kay
- "Away" The Cranberries
- "Leavin' On Your Mind" Patsy Cline
- "Trouble" Shampoo
- "There's More To Life Than This" Björk
- "I Don't Need" The Cranberries
- "Stay" Shakespeare's Sister
- "Missed" PJ Harvey
- "Jewel" Marcella Detroit
- "World In Motion" New Order
- "No Need To Argue"' The Cranberries

== Reception ==
Film critic Roger Ebert, in a positive review, noted that the characters' names are shortened to "Mi" and "Eu" throughout the film, suggesting that they may represent "parts of a schizophrenic personality."

Variety called it "An often breathtakingly original meld of road movie, lesbian love story, psychodrama and black comedy".

Andrew Billen praised the dialogue in what he described as "a lesbian Thelma and Louise set on the M6".

Howard Feinstein of The Advocate described it as a "touching love story".

== See also ==
- Aileen Wuornos
