= Saskia Reeves =

British actress (born 1961)

- Born: 16 August 1961 (age 65); Paddington, London, England
- Occupation: Actress
- Years active: 1984–present
- Children: 2

Saskia Reeves (born 16 August 1961) is a British actress. She has appeared in films including Close My Eyes (1991), I.D. (1995) and Our Kind of Traitor (2016). On television she has appeared in the 2000 miniseries Frank Herbert's Dune and as a series regular in Luther (2010), Shetland (2016) and Slow Horses (2022–present).

== Early life and education ==
Saskia Reeves was born on 16 August 1961 to a Dutch mother and English father, and brought up in Twickenham and Paddington, London. Reeves attended the Lady Eleanor Holles School in Hampton.

According to Reeves, her father was an actor, writer and singer. As a teenager, while her parents did not encourage her, she and her sister attended weekend acting workshops "for a laugh". Reeves was faring poorly in secondary school, missing classes and not doing homework, and did not take her university-qualifying A-level exams. She discovered "drama school" as an alternative to university that didn't require A-levels; it sounded like "brilliant fun" and would give her three years to figure out her future. She attended London's Guildhall School of Music and Drama. She then worked for a year and a half as a waitress before getting a "decent job in a theatre in Wales", followed by other jobs, until she concluded, "I could earn a living at this".

== Career ==
Early in her career Reeves performed in puppet shows and in satirical revues at the Covent Garden Community Theatre. Her stage work includes productions with the Royal Shakespeare Company and at London's Royal National Theatre. She was a member of the Cheek by Jowl international theatre company. In 2008, she starred in the English Touring Theatre revival of Athol Fugard's Hello and Goodbye at the Trafalgar Studios in London.

Reeves work in film includes: Close My Eyes (1991); I.D. (1995); Butterfly Kiss (1995) co-starring with Amanda Plummer – described in the New York Times as "a disturbing road movie that suggests a twisted British answer to 'Thelma and Louise' spiced with dashes of 'Heavenly Creatures' and 'Natural Born Killers'"; and Our Kind of Traitor (2016).

Reeves's numerous television credits include Spooks, The Commander and the Bodies finale. In 1997, Plotlands, a six-part BBC One miniseries about the creation of the suburbs in the 1920s, was her first major TV series role. In 2010, she starred as Anne Darwin, the wife of John Darwin, in BBC Four's Canoe Man, a dramatization of the John Darwin disappearance case, and co-starred as DSU Rose Teller in the first season of the BBC One series Luther. In 2011, Reeves played the matriarch, Anna Brangwen, in the first part of William Ivory's two-part adaptation of D. H. Lawrence's novels The Rainbow and Women in Love, first shown on BBC Four. She co-stars with Gary Oldman and Kristin Scott Thomas in the Apple TV series Slow Horses (2022–present).

Reeves has also done voice work, including commercials, narration and book readings.

== Personal life ==
Reeves has two children.

== Filmography ==
=== Film ===
Year	Title	Role
1991	December Bride	Sarah Gilmartin
1991	Close My Eyes	Natalie / Sister
1991	The Bridge	Isobel Heatherington
1994	Traps	Louise Duffield
1995	Butterfly Kiss	Miriam
1995	I.D.	Lynda
1996	Different for Girls	Jean
1998	L.A. Without a Map	Joy
1999	Heart	Maria Ann McCardle
2003	The Tesseract	Rosa
2008	Me and Orson Welles	Barbara Luddy
2013	Anna (originally Mindscape)	Michelle Greene
2013	Nymphomaniac: Vol. 1	Nurse
2015	The Program	Conference doctor
2016	Our Kind of Traitor	Tamara
2016	The Prime Minister	US President
2020	Delia Derbyshire: The Myths and Legendary Tapes	Maddalena Fagandini / Jen / Actor / Mary Wollstonecraft
2020	Shadows	Mother
2021	Creation Stories	Helen
2024	The Outrun	Annie

=== Television ===
Year	Title	Role	Notes
1984	Last Day of Summer	Linda	TV movie
1985	A Woman of Substance	Edwina	Episode: #1.3
1985	Lytton's Diary	Pretty Girl	Episode 1.2: "Daddy's Girls"
1989	Theatre Night	Greta Samsa	Episode: "Metamorphosis"
1990	Screen Two	Rosie	Episode: "Children Crossing"
1990	Screenplay	Antonia McGill	Episode: "Antonia and Jane"
1991	4 Play	Helen	Episode: "In the Border Country"
1994	Citizen Locke	Lady Marsham	TV movie
1994	Performance	Irina Shestova	Episode: "Summer Day's Dream"
1995	The Perfect Match	Bridget	TV movie
1995	Cruel Train	Selina Roberts	TV movie
1997	Plotlands	Chloe Marsh	
1999	A Christmas Carol	Mrs. Cratchit	TV movie
2000	Frank Herbert's Dune	Lady Jessica	Episodes 1.2-3
2003	Suspicion	Julie Hopcroft	Episodes: 1.1-3
2003	Waking the Dead	Dr. Laurie Poole	Episodes 3.5-6: "Breaking Glass: Part 1 & 2"
2004	A Line in the Sand	Meryl Rodgers	TV mini-series
2004	Island at War	Cassie Mahy	
2005	The Commander	Eileen Judd	Episode: #2.1-2: "Virus (Part One & Two)"
2005	If...	Mary Alton	Episode 2.4: "If... TV Goes Down the Tube"
2005	The Strange Case of Sherlock Holmes & Arthur Conan Doyle	Louise Doyle	TV movie
2005	Afterlife	Sheila Rabey	
2006	The Inspector Lynley Mysteries	Eileen Edwards	Episode 5.1: "Natural Causes"
2006	MI-5	Sally / Sally Bernard	Episodes 5.6-7: "Hostage Takers: Part 1 & 2"
2006	Bodies	Mary Dodd	Episode 2.11: "The Finale"
2007	The Last Days of the Raj	Lady Mountbatten	TV movie
2007	Silent Witness	DS Maureen Steele	
2008	The Fixer	Andrea Greene	Episode 1.4
2009	Red Riding: The Year of Our Lord 1983	Mandy Wymer	TV movie
2010	Canoe Man	Anne Darwin	TV movie
2010	Luther	DSU Rose Teller	Season 1
2010–12	Wallander	Vanja Andersson	Episodes 2.3 "The Fifth Woman" (2010), 3.1 "An Event in Autumn" (2012)
2010–2016	Midsomer Murders	Marcia Macintyre, Summer Pitt	Episodes 13.2: "The Sword of Guillaume" (2010), 18.4: "A Dying Art" (2016)
2011	Lewis	Alison McLennan	Episode 5.1: "Old, Unhappy, Far Off Things"
2011	Women in Love	Anna Brangwen	TV mini-series
2011	Page Eight	Anthea Catcheside	TV movie
2012	One Night	Sally	TV mini-series
2012	Playhouse Presents	Teddy Brookman	Episode 1.1 "The Minor Character"
2013	Vera	Laura Marsden	Episode 3.2 "Poster Child"
2013	NTSF:SD:SUV	P.M.O.T.R.N.	Episode 3.10 "U-KO'ed"
2014	Salting the Battlefield	Anthea Catcheside	TV movie
2014	From There to Here	Claire	TV mini-series. Episodes 1.1-3
2015	Wolf Hall	Johane Williamson	TV mini-series. Episodes 1.1 "Three Card Trick", 1.2 "Entirely Beloved", 1.3 "Anna Regina", 1.4 "The Devil's Spit", 1.6 "Master of Phantoms"
2016	Shetland	Freya Galdie	Series 3 (5 episodes)
2017	Silent Witness	DS Maureen Steele	Episodes 20.3 "Discovery: Part 1", 20.4 "Discovery: Part 2)"
2017	Redemption Road	Mrs. Hales	TV movie
2017	The Child in Time	Thelma	TV movie
2018	Collateral	Deborah Clifford	TV mini-series. Episodes 1.1, 1.4
2019	Death in Paradise	Frances Compton	Episode: "Beyond the Shining Sea: Part Two"
2020	Belgravia	Ellis	TV mini-series
2020	Us	Connie Petersen	TV mini-series
2020	Roadkill	Helen Laurence	Episodes 1.2-4
2022–present	Slow Horses	Catherine Standish	Main role
2024	Secrets & Spies: A Nuclear Game	Herself (Narrator)	3 Episodes (BBC)

=== Shorts ===
Year	Title	Role
1999	Ticks	
2001	Bubbles	Annie
2004	The Knickerman	Mum
2006	Fast Learners	Lynda
2013	Unoriginal	Beatrice
2015	Be Now	Karen
2015	Out for a Walk	Mother

=== Stage ===
Year	Title	Role	Notes
1985	The Man Mode	Harriet	Cheek by Jowl
1986	A Midsummer Night's Dream	Hermina	RSC
1986	Metamorphosis	Greta	
1987	Who's Afraid of Virginia Woolf	Honey	Hampstead Theatre
1987	Measure for Measure	Isabella	
1988	Twelfth Night	Viola	RSC
1989	Icecream	Jaq	Royal Court Theatre
1991	The Two Gentlemen of Verona	Silvia	RSC
1991-1992	The Virtuoso	Miranda	RSC
1992	Tis Pity She's A Whore	Annabella	RSC
1992	A Woman Killed with Kindness	Anne Frankford	RSC
1993	King Lear	Regan	Royal Court
1996	Sweet Panic	Mrs. Trevel	Hampstead Theatre
1998	Much ado about Nothing	Beatrice	Cheek by Jowl
1999	The Darker Face of the Earth	Amalia Jennings Lafarge	National Theatre
2000	Orpheus Descending	Carol Cutrere	Donmar Warehouse
2010	National Theatre Live: A Disappearing Number	Ruth Minnen	National Theatre Live
2014	The Mistress Contract	She	
2017	King Lear: Live from Shakespeare's Globe	Kent	
2018	Curtains	Katherine	
2019	The Tragedy of King Richard the Second	Bushy / Green / Duchess of York	National Theatre Live
2025	National Theatre: End	Julie	National Theatre Live

=== Audio ===
Year	Title	Role
2019	Dr. Who: The Monthly Adventures	Carmen Rega (voice)
