= The Brief (2004 TV series) =

- Title card
- Genre: Crime drama
- Created by: Dusty Hughes
- Written by: Dusty Hughes
- Starring: Alan Davies; Linda Bassett; Christopher Fulford; Cherie Lunghi; Robert Whitelock
- Composers: John E. Keane; Paul Leonard-Morgan
- Country of origin: United Kingdom
- Original language: English
- No. of series: 2
- No. of episodes: 8

Production
- Executive producers: Ted Childs; Michele Buck; Damien Timmer
- Producers: Chris Burt; Graeme McArthur
- Running time: 90 mins
- Production companies: Carlton Television (Series 1); Granada Television (Series 2)

Original release
- Network: ITV
- Release: 25 April 2004 – 28 October 2005

The Brief is a British crime drama series first broadcast on ITV on 25 April 2004. The series follows the work of defence barrister Henry Farmer (Alan Davies), whose complicated personal life manages to overlap into his work. Other stars in the series include Linda Bassett, Christopher Fulford and Cherie Lunghi. After critical acclaim and strong viewing figures for the first series of four episodes, a second and final series was commissioned, which began transmission on 7 October 2005.

However, the second series did not achieve the same viewing figures as the first; and following rumblings of the possible return of Jonathan Creek, Davies quit the role and a third series was not commissioned. However, both series were subsequently released in a double DVD box set on 27 April 2009, and were digitally released via the ITV store on 14 February 2016.

== Plot ==
The Brief follows the work of defence barrister Henry Farmer (Alan Davies), whose complicated personal life manages to overlap into his work. With an overbearing workload, debt and alimony payments to meet, as well as being in love with the wife of a prominent politician who won't leave her husband for him, Henry is forced to set his own demons to one side to tackle cases that only he can win. The show was described by the Radio Times as an "engaging blend of courtroom drama, suspense, intrigue and humour".

== Cast ==
- Alan Davies as Henry Farmer QC
- Steven Alvey as Paul Bracewell
- Linda Bassett as Maureen Tyler
- Christopher Fulford as Ray Scanlon
- Cherie Lunghi as Cleo Steyn
- Edward Petherbridge as Gillespie
- Robert Whitelock as Ben Halliwell

== Episode list ==
=== Series 1 (2004) ===
No. overall	No. in series	Title	Directed by	Written by	Original release date	Viewers (millions)
1	1	"The Road to Hell"	Jack Gold	Dusty Hughes	25 April 2004	6.64
Henry takes on three cases at once in order to close his financial shortfall, including an immigrant rug dealer accused of false advertising, an alleged fence dealing in stolen property, and a former mental patient accused of drowning her boyfriend's two children.
2	2	"So Long, Samantha"	Jack Gold	Dusty Hughes	2 May 2004	5.42
Henry deals with accusations of misconduct in his latest case after offering help to an aggrieved father who believes his Anglo-Greek daughter was raped and murdered before falling to her death in Jakarta - but local police have declared that it was suicide or an accident.
3	3	"Children"	Stuart Orme	Dusty Hughes	9 May 2004	6.74
Henry switches over to a prosecution role, but he's far from happy about it. The defendant is a 12-year-old girl accused of murdering a nine-year-old child, and the trial becomes a choice between one bad verdict and another that could be even worse.
4	4	"A Sort of Love"	Sandy Johnson	Dusty Hughes	16 May 2004	6.58
Henry works on the appeal for a man convicted of killing his partner in a twisted sexual triangle, while his own love triangle takes on a few new twists of its own. A missing Ferrari, long-hidden secrets, and difficult clients all push Henry to his limits.

=== Series 2 (2005) ===
No. overall	No. in series	Title	Directed by	Written by	Original release date	Viewers (millions)
5	1	"Blame"	Minkie Spiro	Dusty Hughes	7 October 2005	4.60
Henry's love life has derailed, and his financial situation has crashed, leaving him temporarily homeless. But his problems are made even worse when he is forced to deal with his own father as a witness in the trial of a train driver.
6	2	"Lack of Affect"	John Deery	Amanda Coe	14 October 2005	5.17
Henry's newest client, a young man with Asperger syndrome accused of murdering his own mother, may be the only habitually honest person involved in the case. Revelations of adultery and a suspicious bruise complicate matters almost as much as Henry's own life.
7	3	"Forever on the Mind"	David Drury	Dusty Hughes	21 October 2005	5.24
Henry defends a nurse accused of murdering an elderly patient who added her to his will two days before his death. Unfortunately, she's determined to speak out and clear her name no matter what Henry says.
8	4	"The Architect's WifeThe Architect’s Wife"	Ian Knox	Dusty Hughes	28 October 2005	5.43
With almost no evidence in hand, Henry's case against an accused rapist falls to pieces, and the civil action he takes up on behalf of the victim tears his life apart. Couch surfing and fiscally reeling, he is unprepared to see his father is seriously ill.
