= Cruel Train =

- Genre: Crime drama
- Written by: Malcolm McKay
- Directed by: Malcolm McKay
- Starring: David Suchet; Saskia Reeves; Adrian Dunbar; Alec McCowen; Minnie Driver; Richard Ridings; Melanie Hill
- Composer: Nick Bicât
- Country of origin: United Kingdom
- No. of episodes: 1

Production
- Executive producers: George Faber; Chris Parr
- Producer: Mervyn Gill-Dougherty
- Cinematography: Sean Van Hales
- Editor: Masahiro Hirakubo
- Running time: 100 minutes
- Production company: BBC Worldwide

Original release
- Network: BBC2
- Release: 22 December 1996

Cruel Train (also known as The Beast in Man) is a British television crime drama, written and directed by Malcolm McKay, and first broadcast on BBC2 on 22 December 1996. Based on Émile Zola's 1890 novel La Bête humaine, and set during the Blitz, the film stars David Suchet as Ruben Roberts, a railway official who discovers that his wife, Selina (Saskia Reeves), was sexually abused as a child by the Chairman of the Line, Arthur Grandridge (David Belcher), who is her godfather. Assisted by Selina, Ruben plots to murder Grandridge on the Brighton Express.

Filming for Cruel Train took place at Pebble Mill Studios between 25 November and 22 December 1994, with a budget of £1.25 million. The set was built entirely from scratch in a disused warehouse on the site of the former GEC turbine and transformer works, which was demolished shortly after filming ceased. In 1996, Cruel Train was nominated for the British Academy Television Craft Award for Best Original Television Music. Despite remaining commercially unreleased on VHS or DVD, Cruel Train is available to stream on Amazon Prime Video in the United States.

== Cast ==
- David Suchet as Ruben Roberts
- Saskia Reeves as Selina Roberts
- Adrian Dunbar as Jack Dando
- Alec McCowen as Supt. Fish
- Jonathan Moore as Sgt. Handy
- Richard Ridings as Percy Cotton
- Melanie Hill as Phyllis Pratt
- Vivienne Burgess as Mrs. Liddle
- Gerard Horan as Colin Caine
- Minnie Driver as Flora Mussell
- Bryan Pringle as Maurice Mussell
- Sheila Reid as Vera Mussell
- Patrick Godfrey as Mr. Davidson
- Steven Crossley as John Muster
- Paul McKay as Henry Holloway
- David Belcher as Arthur Grandridge
- N15 class no. 777 as the locomotive
