= Nina Hibbin =

English film critic and author (1922–2004)

Nina Gloria Hibbin (28 September 1922 – 28 May 2004) was an English film critic and author. She was the film critic for the Daily Worker (subsequently known as the Morning Star) from 1957 to 1971, and also wrote reviews for The Lady. After retiring from journalism, she became the first person to work in the position of films officer for the Yorkshire Arts Association. During the late 1970s, she was programme director of the BFI-aligned Tyneside Cinema in Newcastle upon Tyne. She is the author of Eastern Europe: An Illustrated Guide and co-author (with her daughter, film producer Sally Hibbin) of What a Carry On – The Official Story of the Carry On Films.

Hibbin was a staunch communist and ensured that her reviews conveyed her political convictions. Writing in The Guardian shortly after her death, film critic Derek Malcolm said: "She will be remembered for her passionate advocacy of east European cinema, her hatred of the censorship sometimes imposed on it by regimes with no taste for rebellious art, and for her many campaigns to persuade British distributors to screen what was then called third-world cinema." In 2019, Ranker listed Nina Hibbin at number 15 in its list of "Famous Female Film Critics".

== Childhood and early career ==
Hibbin was born in Romford, Essex. Her family were Jewish and originated from Eastern Europe.

At the outbreak of the Second World War in September 1939, Hibbin began working as an investigator for the Mass-Observation (MO) research organisation. She first reported on the British public's reaction to posters about the war. She went on to write studies on antisemitism in London's East End, conditions in the city's air-raid shelters, and the role of the Women's Auxiliary Air Force (WAAF). She worked as an observer in the East End throughout the early part of the war, engaging citizens in casual conversation to ascertain morale and the effectiveness of the government's security measures. She was highly opposed to the MO's ties with the Ministry of Information, however, describing the link as an "act of betrayal". She resigned from the job in 1941, out of protest at what she saw as the ministry's manipulation of her reports, and once the opportunity came for women to enlist in military units on the home front.

Hibbin welcomed the opportunities presented by the war and enlisted in the WAAF. She later said: "Before the war, there was virtually no way well-brought-up young women could leave home and the prospect was simply that you got married to leave home. And now suddenly there was this possibility of joining the WAAF ... [We] knew we would learn a trade, we would travel, and ... just the mere fact of leaving home meant a lot, being free from the chores that were expected of women ..." She worked as a mechanic on Spitfire fighter planes at RAF Hendon, north of London.

A contributor to Picture Post magazine, Hibbin wrote captions for photographs of working people. Her socialist convictions were further reflected in her authorship of reports for the London Workers' Film Society and a conference paper at the International Film Festival in Moscow and at the Symposium in Repino, Leningrad.

Hibbin was disappointed that, with the end of hostilities, women's opportunities in the armed services evaporated. After demobbing from the WAAF, Hibbin trained as a teacher at Dartington Hall, near Totnes in Devon. She then taught at a school in Cornwall, where her communist sympathies proved controversial. She returned to London in the early 1950s.

== Film criticism ==
In 1960, Hibbin became a member of the Critics' Circle, the national professional body of critics for dance, drama, film, music, visual arts and architecture. She began working as the film critic for the communist Daily Worker newspaper (retitled the Morning Star in 1966). She was billed as a "guest critic" when her first reviews appeared on 30 November 1957 but became a permanent critic two weeks later. Despite its political slant, she also wrote film reviews for The Lady. She became a familiar sight, travelling to screenings in London on her motorbike.

Hibbin's contributions to the Daily Worker and the Morning Star reflected her strident opinions on cinema and politics. In a June 1964 article on the critical reception given to The Finest Hours, a documentary about Winston Churchill, The New York Times reported: "Nina Hibbin of the Daily Worker took exception to the scant mention of the part the Soviet Union played in the war. 'The battle of Stalingrad, it now appears, was won by the weather,' she wrote." Her review of Come Back, Africa – in which she described the film as "the most damning indictment of apartheid and the pass system that I have ever seen" and asked, "How long are we going to allow these appalling conditions to exist?" – ensured that the Daily Worker fully embraced the anti-apartheid cause. She described Lindsay Anderson's If ... as a "devastating view ... of the cruel traditions which go into the shaping of the ruling class" and judged it "the best and most significant film of the Sixties".

Derek Malcolm wrote in 2004 that Hibbin's reviews were "full of her sympathy for working people and against what she saw as the soul-destroying glibness of Hollywood". She also lobbied British film distributors to release films from Eastern Europe and lesser-known countries, as well as titles such as Ken Loach's Kes. In 1969, she authored the book Eastern Europe: An Illustrated Guide. She decided to abandon film criticism in 1971.

== Later career and retirement ==
Hibbin became the first-ever films officer for the Yorkshire Arts Association, a role in which she awarded grants to local filmmakers. From 1976 to 1979, she was director of the BFI-aligned Tyneside Cinema in Newcastle upon Tyne. She oversaw a programme of films combining populist and more progressive tastes. One early critic of her programme bemoaned the preponderance of "films about tractor collectives in the Ukraine". Hibbin's directorship nevertheless led to healthy audience numbers at the Tyneside, a trend that continued under her successor, Sheila Whitaker.

Hibbin retired and moved to Boulby, near Staithes in North Yorkshire. There, she and her husband Eric ran a café beside the Cleveland Way, a popular walking track. She edited two books of poetry by local writers. In 1988, she and her daughter, Sally Hibbin, co-wrote a book about the Carry On film series titled What a Carry On – The Official Story of the Carry On Films.

In 2001, she moved to Saltburn. In her final years, she was afflicted with heart disease, emphysema, kidney failure and cancer. On her death in May 2004, she was survived by her daughter Sally, a film producer.
