= New Town Utopia =

- Directed by: Christopher Ian Smith
- Produced by: Christopher Ian Smith
- Starring: Jim Broadbent; Terry Bird; Vincent O'Connell
- Cinematography: Christopher Ian Smith
- Edited by: Neil Lenthall; Christopher Ian Smith
- Music by: Greg Haines (composer); Steve Cookman (dubbing); Robin Green (sound designer)
- Production company: Cult Modern
- Release date: 4 May 2018 (United Kingdom)
- Running time: 80 minutes
- Country: United Kingdom

New Town Utopia is a 2018 documentary feature film about the British new town experiment. It is an alternative social history of the Essex town of Basildon, including interviews and performances from artists, poets and musicians of the town.

== Plot ==
The poetic narrative of the film explores topics including: the flawed utopian ambition of post-war planning and design, social housing and the impact of Thatcher's right-to-buy policy; the neglect of creative and cultural facilities by national and local government; and the demonisation of working-class people by the British media.

== Release ==
New Town Utopia was released theatrically the UK on 4 May 2018. It was directed by British filmmaker Christopher Ian Smith and executive produced by Margaret Matheson (Scum, Sid and Nancy, Sleep Furiously). It features actor Jim Broadbent (Iris, Topsy-Turvy, Moulin Rouge!) as the voice of Lewis Silkin MP. Hippy Joe Hymas of the band Hayseed Dixie also features.

== Reception ==
It was well received by critics and audiences. It has a 100% Fresh rating on Rotten Tomatoes. The Guardian's Peter Bradshaw called it an "Unapologetically upbeat film in which utopianism is taken unexpectedly seriously. Absorbing and heartening." The Times review said it was "Consistently fascinating, unfolds like a warning from history'.

== Cast ==
- Jim Broadbent
- Terry Bird
- Vincent O'Connell
- Joe Morgan
- Ralph Dartford
- Sue Ryder Paget
- Mike Parker
- Kath Joyce-Banks
- Shaun Badham
- Vin Harrop
- Penny Betteridge
- Rob Marlow
- Tim Williams
- Pat Joyce
- Stuart Brown
- Phil Burdett
- Richard Lee
- Richard Hawkins
- Marc Barnacle
- Ölmo Lazarus
- Steve Waters
- Barry Hayes
- ”Hippy” Joe Hymas
