= I.D. (1995 film) =

- Directed by: Philip Davis
- Screenplay by: Vincent O'Connell
- Story by: James Bannon
- Produced by: Sally Hibbin
- Starring: Reece Dinsdale; Warren Clarke; Sean Pertwee; Richard Graham; Perry Fenwick; Philip Glenister; Saskia Reeves; Claire Skinner; Lee Ross
- Cinematography: Thomas Mauch
- Edited by: Inge Behrens
- Music by: Will Gregory
- Production companies: PolyGram Filmed Entertainment; BBC Films; Parallax Pictures; Metropolis Filmproduktion; Hamburg Film Fund; European Co-Production Fund
- Distributed by: PolyGram Filmed Entertainment
- Release date: 5 May 1995
- Running time: 107 minutes
- Countries: United Kingdom; Germany
- Language: English
- Box office: £286,407 (UK)

I.D. is a 1995 film made by BBC Films about football hooliganism, directed by Philip Davis, screenplay written by Vincent O'Connell based on the original story by James Bannon, and starring Reece Dinsdale, Sean Pertwee and Warren Clarke. It is set in 1988 in the Shadwell area of East London, England, and is a story about a group of Metropolitan Police officers who are sent undercover to infiltrate a gang of dangerous football hooligans.

Although set in London, a lot of the film was filmed in South Yorkshire, in particular Rotherham and Sheffield. Millmoor stadium in Rotherham served as Shadwell Town's fictional home "The Kennel". The tagline is "When you go undercover, remember one thing... Who you are." The true events that inspired the movie are chronicled in the 2013 book Running with the Firm written by former undercover detective James Bannon. The film has a cult following. In 2016, twenty one years after the original the film was released, it received a sequel named ID2: Shadwell Army.

== Plot ==
Set in 1988, John (Reece Dinsdale), an ambitious young police officer in the Metropolitan Police, is sent undercover along with colleagues Trevor (Richard Graham), Eddie (Perry Fenwick) and Charlie (Philip Glenister) to join a violent football firm associated with Shadwell Town Football Club. Their mission is to track down the 'generals' – the shadowy figures who orchestrate the violence. Posing as painter and decorators, John and Trevor begin frequenting the main hooligan pub, "The Rock" at lunch times and later start visiting on match days. After becoming familiar with barmaid Linda (Saskia Reeves) and some of the regulars, they start attending matches with hooligans Martin (Sean Pertwee), Nik (Charles De'Ath) and Gumbo (Lee Ross). During one pub crawl, they get into a brawl with Arsenal fans.

As a bus of Midchester fans goes past the pub, John tells Trevor that he needs to find out where they are going and runs out of the pub, following the bus which is eventually held up in traffic. The bus is then ambushed and attacked by the Shadwell firm who have followed John from the pub. Firm leader Bob (Warren Clarke) who was initially suspicious of John, now lauds him as a hero for leading the charge against the away fans.

The hard-drinking and hard-fighting macho culture (where Saturday's match and Saturday's fight are all that matters) prove irresistible to John and he finds himself slowly becoming one of the thugs he has been sent to entrap. En route to the next game, Martin informs John of the location of the next fight between Shadwell and an opposing firm. Trevor calls ahead from a service station payphone to inform the police of the details. With the location given away, the police are on the scene and make arrests.

Martin, now heavily suspicious of John and Trevor, accuses them of being police officers. John's answers convince Bob and Martin that they are who they say they are. Later, John pretends to be unable to read when playing on a pub quiz machine which appears to get rid of any certainty that he is a policeman. John's relationships with his wife Marie (Claire Skinner), his superiors and even his undercover team become strained. He begins to ignore his wife, leading to an argument during which John attempts to violently have sex with her.

In the next round of the FA Cup, Shadwell are drawn away at local rivals, Wapping. Before the game, Bob convinces John and Trevor to come with them to where the home fans are in order to start a fight. Martin and Nik call them mad and the rest of the gang head off to the away end. When Trevor sees one of the Shadwell hooligans with a machete, he panics and leaves.

Eventually a fight occurs and the group are ejected. John is led away by several policeman but breaks free, running into the Shadwell end where he is greeted as a hero. Marie organises a beach holiday, but after an argument the pair break up and she returns to her parents' house. John, in a drunk stupor, turns up at Linda's house and the pair begin an affair.

Shadwell's next match is away at Tyneburn. During a stand off inside the stadium the home fans begin throwing objects, one of which a dart hits and injures Gumbo. Martin and Nik attempt to climb up over the fence separating the two fans but are pulled down by the police. Following the game, the firm chase off a group of Tyneburn fans but this leads them to a deserted market place where they are confronted by their firm who are armed with weapons. With Shadwell outnumbered, other members of the gang run away leaving John and Martin who charge at the gang. It is later revealed that one of the Tyneburn fans was fatally stabbed and subsequent CCTV footage viewed by Trevor, Eddie and Charlie shows that John is responsible. Trevor however trashes the video tape to spare John of conviction.

Later back in "The Rock", Bob tells John that one of the "generals" Wynton wants a word with him. Wynton passes John a packet of drugs and tells him that he has been watching him and that he could use his skills in the criminal underworld. The following morning John returns to the investigation HQ to find out that the operation is being closed down and later back at Scotland Yard he is told that the team are to be commended but would now have to serve several weeks of beat police duty at their respective divisions, to which Trevor pleads that if any of his targets see him and John in uniform then they would be killed. As the group are coming out of the meeting an officer from the licensing department thanks the team for their evidence and tells them that they've been able to use the information in their report to shut down The Rock. He returns to Linda's house but she attacks him for getting The Rock shut down and says she knew he was a Police Officer the first time she saw him.

John, who is now an alcoholic, attempts to reconcile with Marie but his attempts are rebuffed, which leads to a confrontation with her parents and they are forced to scare him off their property with their dogs. Returning to work as a beat policeman he has a mental breakdown when looking at himself in uniform in the locker room. He later returns home and trashes his entire house. As his addiction takes over, John is later seen emptying cocaine into his breakfast cereal as he sits in his trashed house.

The closing sequence shows a neo Nazi march through the streets to which a shaven-headed John is taking part. Trevor, who is watching the march, approaches him to ask him what he is playing at, but is rebuffed. John says that he is, again, working undercover. There is a degree of ambiguity as he stands to attention performs a Nazi salute and chants Sieg Heil over and over again. This makes it clear that whatever the truth, John is unable to prevent himself from sinking into his character.

== Cast ==
- Reece Dinsdale as John
- Richard Graham as Trevor
- Perry Fenwick as Eddie
- Philip Glenister as Charlie
- Warren Clarke as Bob
- Claire Skinner as Marie
- Saskia Reeves as Lynda
- Sean Pertwee as Martin
- Charles De'Ath as Nik
- Lee Ross as Gumbo
- Terry Cole as Puff
- Steve Sweeney as Vinny
- Nicholas Bailey as Micky
- Nick Bartlett as David Daley
- David Schaal as Paul Funnell
- Alan Cooke as Wynton Mbula
- Peter Blythe as DAC Evans
- Ian Redford as DI Schofield
- Mark Burdis and Jamie Foreman as Previous Team
- Graham Camball as Licensing Officer
- Max Smith as Tyneburn policeman
- Philip Davis as Duty Sergeant
- Michael Brogan as Shadwell Hooligan
- Jason Moody as Shadwell Hooligan
- Jacqueline Leonard as Stef
- Steve Toussaint as Shadwell Hooligan
- Thomas Craig as Tyneburn Leader
- Paul Brennen as Tyneburn Leader

== Development ==
Vincent O'Connell described himself as a "method writer" and said he became so immersed in writing the script that he began acting out himself by getting into scraps with people and starting fights in the pub, and at times had to question why he was acting this way. The plot of the film is loosely based on "Operation Full-Time", a Scotland Yard undercover operation which attempted to identify the leaders of West Ham United's firm, the Inter City Firm (ICF). However, none of the real life officers suffered John's (Reece Dinsdale) fate. The film features the fictitious teams of Shadwell Town and Wapping FC. The locations the teams are based on are real – they are neighbouring areas on the northern bank of the River Thames in London's traditional East End. It is believed that Millwall F.C was the inspiration for one team, as the clubs' fans had a long-standing reputation for violence during the period which the film represents. Another possible parallel is that Shadwell are promoted to the First Division for the first time in their history towards the end of the film - Millwall were promoted to the top flight of English for the first time at the end of the 1987-88 season. Shadwell are also called "The Dogs" and play at "The Kennel" where as Millwall are "The Lions" who played at "The Den".

AFC Bournemouth, Arsenal, Grimsby Town, Portsmouth and Wimbledon are the only real life teams who are mentioned in the film. All other teams are fictional and are Wapping a neighbouring London based club, Midchester described as a club from Birmingham and Tyneburn who are from the North East.

== Production ==
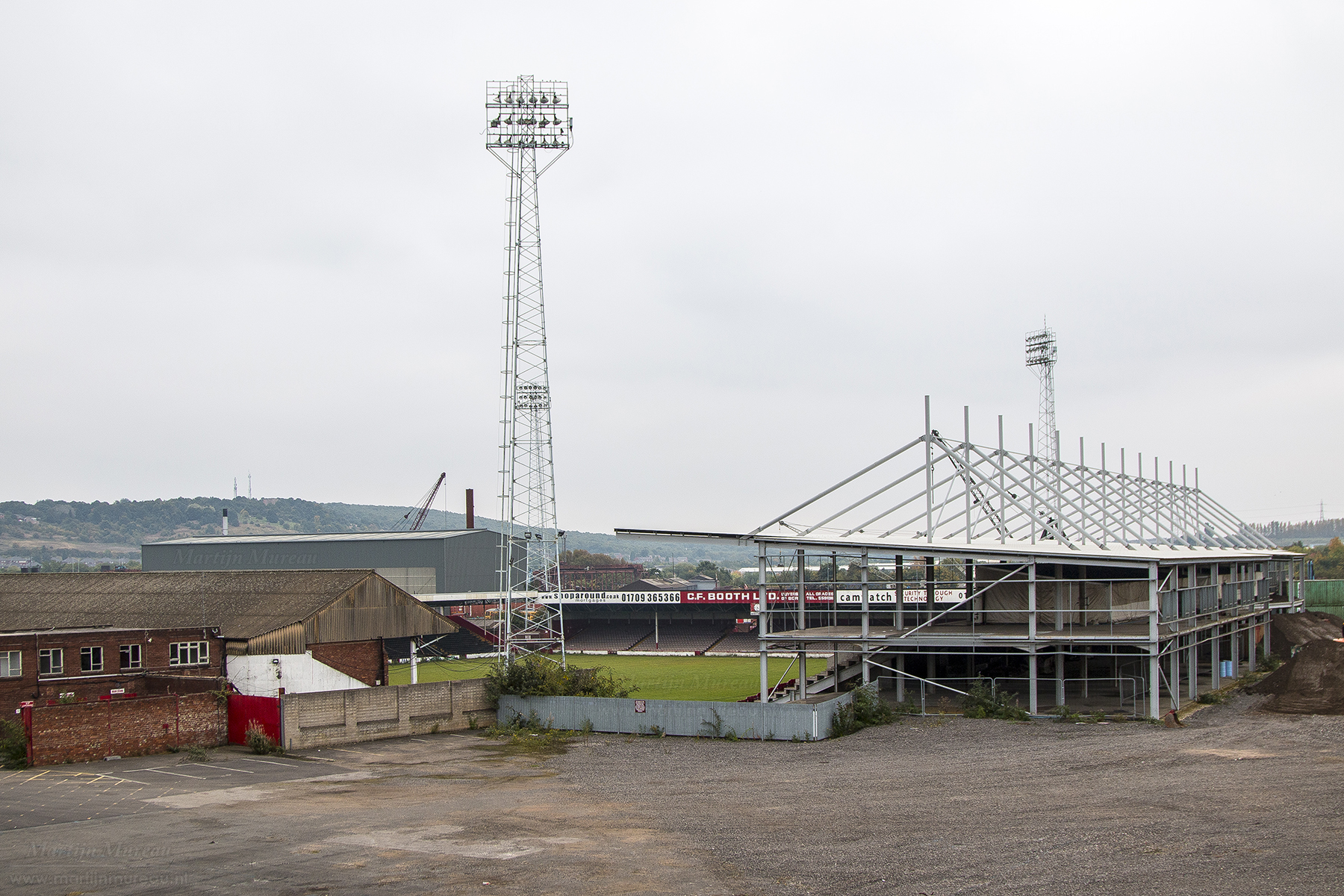
Millmoor (pictured derelict in 2015) appeared as "The Kennel" the home of Shadwell Town.

Filming took part in a number of locations largely across London and Yorkshire. Despite being set in London both interior and exterior shots including the surrounding streets of Rotherham United's stadium Millmoor was used for Shadwell Town's ground "The Kennel". Other stadiums used in the film were Bradford City's Valley Parade, Crystal Palace's Selhurst Park, Leyton Orient's Brisbane Road and Millwall's old ground The Den. Other locations used are Sheffield railway station, Rotherham Centenary Market, Leicester Square and New Scotland Yard.

The pub used as "The Rock" was the Rising Sun on Old Jamaica Road in Bermondsey, South London. The pub was demolished shortly after filming. The Tower Hotel in Wapping was also used.

== Release ==
The film was released in the United Kingdom on 26 screens on 5 May 1995. The film was released on VHS video on 9 March 1998. DVDs were released in 2005, 2009 and 2012, with a Blu-ray release in May 2012.

== Reception ==
IMDb users rate the movie at 7.3 out of 10. Rotten Tomatoes score it at 81%.

The film grossed £43,034 in its opening weekend in the UK, placing twelfth at the UK box office. It went on to gross £286,407.

== Accolades ==
Phil Davis won the "Audience Award" at the Valenciennes International Festival of Action and Adventure Films in 1996, he was also nominated for the "Golden Alexander" award at the Thessaloniki International Film Festival.

== Sequel ==
A sequel, with the title of ID2: Shadwell Army was released in August 2016. It was directed by Joel Novoa, and was written by Vincent O'Connell. The sequel saw Perry Fenwick, Lee Ross and Richard Graham reprise their roles from the original film.

== Legacy ==
Writer, Vincent O'Connell claimed that he was initially very disappointed with how the film turned out and it took him several years to appreciate the film's cult status. "I could never get over how people quote whole chunks of dialogue from the first film, still now, years on. It never stops amazing me," he began. "People send me photos of tattoos with bits of the script they've got on their body. I've been in the pub before and no-one has known me from Adam, and loads of football supporters have started singing Shadwell songs."

O'Connell went on to say that the film failed to reach his artistic goals but had become popular entertainment and after fans had told him he needed to have more respect for the film he decided to re-address his issues with the film. This culminated in him writing the sequel in 2016.

In 2016, British Retro football designer Toffs released a range of Shadwell Town football merchandise.

== See also ==
- List of association football films
