= Deceit (2000 TV series) =

British mystery thriller television series

- Genre: Thriller • Mystery
- Created by: Clare Francis
- Written by: Jacqueline Holborough
- Directed by: Stuart Orme
- Starring: Francesca Annis; Peter O'Brien; Christopher Fulford; James Hazeldine; David Horovitch; Ger Ryan; Sammy Glenn; David Schaal
- Theme music composer: Colin Towns
- Country of origin: United Kingdom
- Original language: English
- No. of series: 1
- No. of episodes: 2

Production
- Executive producers: Pippa Harris; Jane Tranter
- Producer: Nicolas Brown
- Cinematography: Witold Stok
- Editor: Anne Sopel
- Camera setup: Trevor Coop
- Running time: 90 minutes

Original release
- Network: BBC One
- Release: 2 April – 9 April 2000

Deceit is a British television mystery thriller, based on the 1993 novel of the same name by Clare Francis, that first broadcast on BBC One on 2 April 2000. Stuart Orme served as director, while Nicolas Brown served as producer. The miniseries, which stars Francesca Annis, Peter O'Brien and Christopher Fulford, follows housewife Ellen Richmond (Annis), whose husband mysteriously disappears after going out sailing on his yacht.

The series was partly filmed in and around Ipswich. Critical reception to the series was positive. The series was remade as an American television movie with the same title in 2004. Notably, the series has never been released on VHS or DVD; however it is often repeated on True Entertainment as part of their "Best of British" season.

== Cast ==
- Francesca Annis as Ellen Richmond
- Peter O'Brien as Richard Moreland
- Christopher Fulford as Jack Crawford
- James Hazeldine as Henry Richmond
- David Horovitch as Inspector Dawson
- Ger Ryan as Molly Sinclair
- Sammy Glenn as Katie Richmond
- David Schaal as Leo Braithwaite
- Elaine Claxton as Mrs. Anderson
- Jacqueline Cotter as Jill Hooper
- Angela Douglas as Anne Barlow
- Carmel Howard as WDC Owen
- Helene Kvale as Caroline Palmer
- Jon Laurimore as Gordon Critchley
- Charlie Lucas as Josh Richmond
- Tom Lucy as Colin Atkins
- William Oliver as Tim Schwartz
- Philip Pickard as PC Willis
- Paul Ridley as Charles

== Episodes ==
No.	Title	Directed by	Written by	British air date	UK viewers (million)
1	"Episode 1"	Stuart Orme	Jacqueline Holborough	2 April 2000	7.51
Ellen Richmond is devastated to learn her husband Harry, a respected and well-liked businessman, has been lost at sea – but as she begins to rebuild her life, it becomes clear he was not the man she thought.
2	"Episode 2"	Stuart Orme	Jacqueline Holborough	9 April 2000	7.19
Harry's body is recovered and his injuries suggest he committed suicide, but as the police piece together the evidence they begin to suspect Ellen of murder.
