= Sally Hibbin =

British independent film producer (born 1953)

- Born: 3 July 1953 (age 73); London, England
- Occupation: Film Producer

Sally Hibbin (born 3 July 1953) is a British independent film producer, known for her work on low budget films with directors like Ken Loach and Phil Davis as well as producers like Sarah Curtis and Rebecca O'Brien. She has produced various British independent films and some television productions.

She was born on 3 July 1953 in North London. She is the daughter of Nina Hibbin, film critic for the communist Daily Worker (later the Morning Star). Her career also began as a journalist until she founded her independent production company, Parallax Pictures in 1981. She had a lengthy cooperation with Ken Loach, which began in the early 1990s and was “a pivotal period in the director's career”, with films like Riff-Raff (1991), Raining Stones (1993), Ladybird, Ladybird (1994), Land and Freedom (1995) and Carla's Song (1996). She also worked with television directors such as Les Blair on feature films like Bad Behaviour (1993) and Stand and Deliver (1997), as well as actor Phil Davis on his directorial debut motion picture, I.D. (1995) and then, Hold Back the Night (1998).

With Skreba Films, Hibbin assisted in producing A Very British Coup (miniseries) (1988) for Channel 4, a three-part dramatization of the novel by MP, Chris Mullin, depicting United Kingdom under a genuinely socialist Labour government. The series won four BAFTA Awards in 1989 - for Best Actor (Ray McAnally), Best Drama Series (Ann Skinner, Sally Hibbin, Alan Plater and Mick Jackson), Best Film Editor (Don Fairservice) and Best Film Sound (Christian Wangler, David Old and Peter Elliott ) – and a 1988 International Emmy Award for Best Drama. Her other award winning productions are Riff-Raff (1991), which won the Critics' Award at Cannes Film Festival as well as the inaugural Felix for Best European Film, and I Know You Know, which won the BAFTA Cymru award in 2009.

Sally Hibbin is also the author of three books on James Bond films.

== Filmography ==
=== As producer ===
- 1982: Live a Life (Documentary)
- 1983: The Road to Gdansk (TV Movie documentary)
- 1985: Policing London (Documentary short)
- 1988: A Very British Coup (miniseries) (TV Mini-Series)
- 1991: Riff-Raff
- 1993: Raining Stones
- 1994: Ladybird, Ladybird (film)
- 1995: I.D. (1995 film)
- 1996: Carla's Song
- 1998: Pat Condell: Stand and Deliver (TV Special documentary)
- 1999: Dockers (film) (TV Movie)
- 1999: Hold Back the Night
- 2003: Blind Flight
- 2004: Yasmin (2004 film)
- 2006: Almost Adult
- 2008: I Know You Know
- 2016: ID2: Shadwell Army

=== As Executive Producer ===
- 1993: Bad Behaviour (1993 film)
- 1995: Land and Freedom
- 1995: The Englishman Who Went Up a Hill But Came Down a Mountain
- 1998: The Governess
- 1998: Shark Hunt
- 2000: Liam (film)
- 2002: The Intended
- 2011: Biatch! (Short)

== Books ==
- The Official James Bond 007 Movie Book (1987)
- The Making Of Licence To Kill (1989)
