= Blasted =

Play by Sarah Kane

- Cover of the Methuen edition
- Written by: Sarah Kane
- Characters: Ian; Cate; Soldier
- Original language: English
- Subject: War, sexual violence
- Setting: An expensive hotel room in Leeds, UK

Premiere
- Date premiered: 12 January 1995
- Place premiered: Royal Court Theatre Upstairs, London

Blasted is the first play by the British author Sarah Kane. It was first performed in 1995 at the Royal Court Theatre Upstairs in London.

== Synopsis ==
The play is set in an expensive hotel room in Leeds. Ian, a foul-mouthed middle-aged tabloid journalist has brought a young woman, Cate, to the room for the night. Cate is much younger than Ian, emotionally fragile, and seemingly intellectually simple.

Throughout Scene 1, Ian tries to seduce Cate, but she resists. All the while, Ian proudly parades his misogyny, racism and homophobia. The scene ends with the sound of spring rain.

Scene 2 begins the next morning. Ian engages in frottage with Cate during one of her fits. Afterwards, Cate performs oral sex on Ian, biting him. Cate retires to the bathroom. A soldier unexpectedly enters the room brandishing a gun, and finds Cate has escaped through the bathroom window. The hotel room is then struck by a mortar bomb, and the scene ends with the sound of summer rain.

In Scene 3, the hotel room is in ruins; the bomb has blasted a hole in the wall. The soldier and Ian begin to talk, and it is gradually revealed that the hotel is located in the midst of a brutal war. The soldier tells Ian about appalling atrocities that he has witnessed and taken part in, involving rape, torture and genocide, and says he has done everything as an act of revenge for the murder of his girlfriend. He then rapes Ian, and sucks out his eyes. The scene ends with the sound of autumn rain.

In Scene 4, Ian lies blinded next to the soldier, who has committed suicide. Cate returns, describing the city being overrun by soldiers, and bringing with her a baby that she has rescued. The baby dies, and she buries it in a hole in the floorboards and leaves, but not before arguing with Ian about the utility or futility of praying during a burial. The scene ends with the sound of heavy winter rain.

Scene 5 consists of a series of brief images, showing Ian crying, masturbating and even hugging the dead soldier for comfort as he starves in the ruined room. Eventually, he crawls into the hole with the dead baby and eats it. The stage direction then reads that Ian dies. It starts raining, and Ian says "Shit". Cate returns, bringing sausage and gin. The blood seeping down her legs implies that she has paid for this by having sex with the soldiers outside. She eats and hand-feeds the rest of her meal to Ian, who says: "Thank you."

== Notable productions ==
World premiere (London, 1995)

12 January 1995 at the Royal Court Theatre Upstairs, London, UK.
Directed by James Macdonald.

- Ian - Pip Donaghy
- Cate - Kate Ashfield
- Soldier - Dermot Kerrigan

The premiere which prompted headlines labelling the play a "disgusting feast of filth"

Italian premiere

1997 at Teatro della Limonania, Sesto Fiorentino, Florence, Italy. The first Italian appearance of the play.

2001 London revival

2001 at the Royal Court Theatre Downstairs, London, UK.
Directed by James Macdonald.

- Ian - Neil Dudgeon
- Cate - Kelly Reilly
- Soldier - Tom Jordan Murphy

The Royal Court revival which received positive reviews.

2005-2006 German production

16 March 2005 at Schaubühne, Berlin, Germany.
Also performed 7th-11th Nov 2006 at the Barbican, London, UK.
Translated into German by Nils Tabert. Performed under the title of Zerbombt.
Directed by Thomas Ostermeier.

- Ian - Ulrich Mühe
- Cate - Katharina Schüttler
- Soldier - Thomas Thieme

2008 site-specific Leeds production

2008 at Queens Hotel, Leeds, UK.
Directed by Felix Mortimer.

- Ian - Mark Taylor Batty
- Cate - Mariel Kaplan
- Soldier - Ash Layton

Produced in its authentic setting, this production by 19;29 Performance saw the audience invited into the hotel room Kane set the play within.

New York premiere production

2008 at the Soho Rep, New York City, New York, U.S.
Directed by Sarah Benson.

- Ian - Reed Birney
- Cate - Marin Ireland
- Soldier - Louis Cancelmi

2010 London revival

2010 at Lyric Hammersmith, London, UK.
Directed by Sean Holmes.

- Ian - Danny Webb
- Cate - Lydia Wilson
- Soldier - Aidan Kelly

A major revival of the play, 15 years on from its debut, by contemporary of Sarah Kane and the Lyric's Artistic Director Sean Holmes. The production won an Olivier Award for Outstanding Achievement in an Affiliate Theatre.

2015 Sheffield production

2015 at the Crucible Theatre, Sheffield, UK.
Directed by Richard Wilson.

- Ian - Martin Marquez
- Cate - Jessica Barden
- Soldier - Mark Stanley

As part of the Sarah Kane season with staged productions of Blasted, Crave and 4.48 Psychosis and semi-staged readings of Phaedra's Love and Cleansed.

2019 Vienna production

2019 at TheaterArche, Vienna, Austria.
Directed by Tom Crawley.

First original language production of the play in Austria, produced by Mental Eclipse Theater House in cooperation with Vienna theatre project.

== Critical reception ==
The initial performance was highly controversial and the play was fiercely attacked by most newspaper critics, many of whom regarded it as an attempt to shock the audience. However, critics have subsequently reassessed it; for example The Guardian's Michael Billington, who savaged the play in his first review, later recanted in the wake of Kane's suicide: "I got it wrong, as I keep saying. She was a major talent. Apparently, Harold Pinter said at her memorial service that she was a poet, and I think that's dead right." After seeing a revival of the play, an Evening Standard reviewer Annie Ferguson wrote "How shrill and silly the 1995 hullabaloo and hysteria seemed last night when Blasted returned to the Royal Court. It is, and always was, a play with a fine, moral purpose." It was listed in The Independent as one of the 40 best plays ever.

== Bibliography ==
- Kane, Sarah, Sarah Kane: Complete Plays. London: Methuen (2001), ISBN 0-413-74260-1
- Saunders, Graham. Love Me or Kill Me: Sarah Kane and the Theatre of Extremes. Manchester, Eng.: Manchester UP, 2002.
- Sierz, Aleks. "Blasted". The Literary Encyclopedia. 3 June 2004. Accessed 25 Feb. 2007. (Paid subscription required for access to full article; only a portion accessible otherwise.)
