= Vincent O'Connell =

British filmmaker and writer

Vincent O'Connell is a British filmmaker and writer of films, theatre, television and radio drama. His films as director include the 1995 film Skin, starring Ewen Bremner, written by Sarah Kane, and his 2000 film, Beyond the Boundary, which won a British Academy Children's Award. His feature films as a writer include I.D. and ID2: Shadwell Army, other full-length films as writer including Sweet Nothing and Criminal, both for the BBC. Criminal won 1993 Best Single Drama at the Royal Television Society.

== Biography ==
Vincent was born in North London and grew up in Basildon, Essex. He is a prominent interviewee in Christopher Smith's 2017 film about creativity and Basildon, New Town Utopia.

He was educated at Nicholas Comprehensive School, and went on to the University of York, where he studied English Literature and Philosophy. At York, he was very active in student drama, where he acted, directed and wrote his first plays. Several of these were successfully staged at the Edinburgh Festival Fringe, and one, Mr Lovert's Occupation was subsequently performed in Belfast and Newcastle.

In York, after graduating, he worked both as a stagehand at York Theatre Royal and Community Theatre Director at York Arts Centre. He continued to write, and was Director of York Community Theatre, writing and directing a number of large scale touring theatre shows. He went on to direct the Sheffield Street Show for Metro Theatre Company, performed by a company of over a hundred actors.

He then moved to London, where he became a Script Associate at the Royal Court Theatre, and was a member of the Writer's Group there, writing and directing for their production of new short plays Shots In The Dark.

O'Connell was a founder member of Loose Exchange Theatre Company, writing a play Scarecrows which toured England with Arts Council assistance and ran for two months in London. He also wrote and directed in Improbabilities for the Loose Exchange residency at the Soho Poly Theatre (now the Soho Theatre). O'Connell wrote a play cycle Five Minute Warnings for Basildon Youth Theatre which opened the Helen Mirren Studio at the Towngate Theatre in his home town, and first met there a 17 year old actor called Sarah Kane, who became a lifelong friend. Vincent enlisted Kane as Assistant Director with Loose Exchange for their production at the Soho Poly, and she skipped off school to fulfil the role.

While at the Royal Court O'Connell attracted interest from the BBC, where he was commissioned for a string of dramas. He also wrote a Channel 4 short film, Life's A Gas around this time. His first feature film commission, Vicious, was a collaboration with director Alan Clarke, but Alan became ill as the film was preparing for production, and he died in the summer of 1990. Sweet Nothing was O'Connell's first feature-length production with the BBC, broadcast as a 'Screen 1' in September 1990. It was dedicated to the memory of Alan Clarke, and won an Honorable Mention at the San Francisco Film Festival. Both Vicious and Sweet Nothing were developed with producer Louis Marks and script editor Paul Marcus.

A string of BBC commissions followed, of which Criminal received a number of awards including Royal Television Society Best Single Drama in 1995. In the same year his feature film I.D. won a number of international film festival awards and was short-listed for Best Screenplay by the Writers' Guild of Great Britain.

Concurrently with these developments in film work, Vincent was also involved in a number of innovative theatre projects. With Sarah Kane, who was now an undergraduate at Bristol University, he took two shows to Edinburgh in the summers of 1990 and 1991. Dreams, Screams and Silences and Dream/Screams 2 consisted of a series of short works written by O'Connell and monologues written by Sarah - her first publicly performed work.

Throughout these years O'Connell was regularly employed in television script writing.

O'Connell's first two short films as director were self-financed, and were distributed on the same reel as a package of two interlinked dramas. Conform and Deform constitute Sex Crimes, shot on 16mm and also written by O'Connell. The following year he directed Sarah Kane's script Skin, financed by Film 4, which was shortlisted for a Golden Bear at Berlin. He also made a number of no-budget experimental films, which he wrote, directed, shot and edited, including Living Space and Happy Hour. He wrote and directed the BBC-funded Schools Drama Beyond the Boundary, which won a BAFTA for Best Film in its category.

Over recent years O'Connell has created and written a number of major commissioned TV series, none of which have made it into production.

O'Connell has also written Rachman-Empire of Dirt, a feature film based on the very strange life of 1950s slum landlord Peter Rachman, which O'Connell is engaged to direct for Redspur Films. This was first developed by Paul Marcus, to be directed by him.

O'Connell's recent work has included two radio dramas broadcast on BBC Radio 4 - Undivided Heart and Velvet Blackout.

== Produced work ==
=== Film and television ===
- ID2: Shadwell Army : Undercover Asian cop becomes embroiled in rival extremist political gangs. (Universal Pictures/Parallax)
- I.D. (1995 film) : Undercover policeman investigating football gangs adopts the identity of his targets. (BBC/Parallax)
- CRIMINAL : True story of a teenage petty criminal falling through all the social safety nets. (BBC)
- SWEET NOTHING : Homeless teenager journeys through the London underworld. (BBC)
- SKIN : Love story between a racist skinhead and a black woman. Short film. (Channel 4)
- BEYOND THE BOUNDARY : Abusive father is confronted by his children. (BBC)
- SEX CRIMES : Stories of violent sexual encounters. Two short films.
- LIFE’S A GAS : Two itinerants decide to eat and drink themselves to death. Short film. (Channel 4)
- LIVING SPACE : Rites of passage in an Essex newtown. Short film.
- CRACKER: THE BIG CRUNCH : Middle class evangelical family kidnap a vulnerable schoolgirl. TV series. (Granada TV)
- ROCKLIFFE’S FOLLY: WITCH HUNT : Persecution of a pagan mother and her daughter. TV series. (BBC)

=== Radio ===
- UNDIVIDED HEART : A story of grief and recovery. (BBC)
- VELVET BLACKOUT : An amnesiac woman compelled to recover her memory. (BBC)

=== Theatre ===
- PLAGUE MYSTERIES : Epic play, a community struggles with affliction of mythical plague. (National Theatre commission.)
- CABARET ON A SINKING SHIP : Multi-authored political cabaret. (New Writing South)
- DREAMS, SCREAMS AND SILENCES : Short plays. (Nightmare Productions)
- IMPROBABILITIES : Short plays. (Loose Exchange Theatre Company)
- FIVE MINUTE WARNINGS : Large scale youth theatre show. (Basildon Youth Theatre)
- SHOTS IN THE DARK : Short plays. (Royal Court Theatre)
- SCARECROWS : Five young people having very different experiences of London in the 1960s. (Loose Exchange Theatre Company)
