= Crave (play) =

1998 play written by Sarah Kane

- Written by: Sarah Kane
- Characters: C, M, B and A
- Original language: English
- Setting: Neutral

Premiere
- Date premiered: 13 August 1998
- Place premiered: Traverse Theatre, Edinburgh

Crave is a one-act play by British playwright Sarah Kane. It was first performed in 1998 by the theatre company Paines Plough, with which Kane was writer-in-residence for the year, at the Traverse Theatre, Edinburgh. The play was initially presented under the pseudonym Marie Kelvedon; Kane used a pseudonym to avoid the distraction of her reputation for graphic staged violence from her previous works. Crave was Kane's fourth play. It is dedicated by the author to Mark Ravenhill.

== Structure ==
The play reflects a stylistic departure from Kane's previous works, using a non-linear, poetic style, and is notable for its lack of staged violence that had been a hallmark of the author's previous work; this style is continued in her next and final work, 4.48 Psychosis. The dialogue is intertextual, and often it is unclear to whom each line is addressed. Much of the delivery of the text is left up to directorial interpretation.

== Characters ==
In the script of Crave Kane does not provide context, stage directions or clear descriptions of the play's four characters: A, B, C, and M.

However, Kane in an interview revealed the meanings behind the naming of the characters in the play:

"A, B, C and M to me do have very specific meanings, which I am prepared to tell you: which is A was (A is many things) which is the Author, Abuser (because they are the same thing: author and abuser). Aleister as in Aleister Crowley, who wrote some interesting books which some of you might like to read. Antichrist. My brother came up with Arsehole, which I thought was quite good. And there was also the actor who I originally wrote it for who was called Andrew. So that was how A came about. M was simply Mother. B was Boy. And C was Child. But I didn't want to write those things down because then I thought then they'll get fixed in those things forever and never ever change."

The gender of the characters is only identifiable from context within the play. In the same interview Kane explained:

"To me, A was always an older man; M was always an older woman; B was always an younger man and C was always a young woman. I decided not to specify it; I thought there were things the characters said which made it very clear. For example, it would be odd if the man said "When I wake I think my period must have started." That would be very strange. Also it would also be very strange if a man kept on talking about how much he wanted a baby. But, on the other hand, yes it could be done."

== Themes and allusions ==
Crave continues the theme of pain in love that Kane had explored with previous plays, but is stylistically a departure. The play contains several dark themes, presented as issues haunting the four characters. These themes include rape, incest, pedophilia, anorexia, drug addiction, mental instability, murder, and suicide.

Kane incorporates numerous literary allusions in the text of the play, especially to The Waste Land by T.S. Eliot. She also makes several references to biblical scripture, especially through the character of "A".

== "Marie Kelvedon" ==
The pseudonym "Marie Kelvedon" was based on the village of Kelvedon Hatch, where Kane grew up. Kane included the following fictitious biography in the programme notes:

Marie Kelvedon is twenty-five. She grew up in Germany in British Forces accommodation and returned to Britain at sixteen to complete her schooling. She was sent down from St Hilda's College, Oxford, after her first term, for an act of unspeakable Dadaism in the college dining hall. She has had her short stories published in various European literary magazines and has a volume of poems Onzuiver ('Impure') published in Belgium and Holland. Her Edinburgh Fringe Festival debut was in 1996, a spontaneous happening through a serving hatch to an audience of one. Since leaving Holloway she has worked as a mini-cab driver, a roadie with the Manic Street Preachers and as a continuity announcer for BBC Radio World Service. She now lives in Cambridgeshire with her cat, Grotowski.

== Popular culture ==
The lyrics to Icelandic singer Björk's song "An Echo, A Stain", released on the album Vespertine in 2001, are based on this play.
