= David Schaal =

English actor

- Born: 27 May 1963 (age 63); Albuquerque, New Mexico, U.S.
- Education: Rose Bruford College
- Occupations: Actor; director; screenwriter; comedian
- Years active: 1992–present

David Schaal is an English actor, director, screenwriter, and comedian. He is best known for his roles as Taffy in the English sitcom The Office and Terry Cartwright in The Inbetweeners.

== Career ==
Schaal portrayed the warehouse manager Glynn, nicknamed "Taffy" in Ricky Gervais' mockumentary comedy series The Office and the character Terry Cartwright in the hit comedy series The Inbetweeners.

Schaal’s many television credits include Missing, Casualty, The Wrong Door, Beautiful People, Hancock and Joan, Ashes to Ashes, The IT Crowd, Deceit, Doc Martin, Peak Practice, Silent Witness, Hustle, Lead Balloon, Dangerfield, a cameo in the 2005 series of The Basil Brush Show.

More recently, Schaal has appeared in Veep, Fearless, playing Brunsden for a season in Hetty Feather, Ghosts, Victoria and Britannia.

His film credits include Kidulthood, Mr. Nobody, Clubbed, and Dirty Weekend. In 2008, he provided the voice for Mad-Dog "The Strangler" McGraw in the action role-playing video game Fable II.

Schaal has also appeared as Norm, Shirley Carter's seedy landlord, in EastEnders. He played troubled father Tom Hargreaves in Grange Hill. Other notable credits include The Murder of Stephen Lawrence, Relative Values, and football hooligan film I.D. Schaal also played Eric in British gangster film Down Terrace.

Schaal wrote the short films Poppy's Present (directed by Chris Jury) and Half Time (directed by Duncan Roe). He also co-wrote the play Reality Chokes and appeared in it as Rob, and directed a production of the play at the Edinburgh Festival in 2010. Other writing credits include the plays Shame, No Hiding Place, The Legacy of Colonel Ash, and Baby Blue.

In 2012, Schaal wrote and directed the play Brotherly Love for The Real London Ensemble at Pentameters Theatre. He then appeared in English soap Hollyoaks in September 2013, playing the role of Ken, who is falsely accused of sexually interfering with Robbie Roscoe (Charlie Wernham). Schaal and Wernham both previously co-starred in The Inbetweeners.

Schaal has worked extensively in Canada and the United States on The Strain filming in Toronto with David Bradley, Frontier filming in Newfoundland with Alun Armstrong and Zoe Boyle and You're the Worst filming in L.A. opposite Chris Geere and Aya Cash. Schaal also played Colonel Gubbins in the film A Call to Spy filming in Philadelphia and playing opposite Stana Katic and Linus Roache.

In March 2021, he appeared in an episode of the BBC soap opera Doctors as Colin Turner and later in the year, appeared as police officer DS Foden in three episodes of EastEnders.

In 2022, Schaal co-wrote the feature film Back to Archway with Matt Bartlett and Heavenly Waters with writer/producer Kim Leggatt.

Schaal is a lifelong supporter of West Ham United.
