= Sarah Kane =

English playwright (1971–1999)

- Born: 3 February 1971; Brentwood, Essex, England
- Died: 20 February 1999 (aged 28); Camberwell, London, England
- Cause of death: Suicide by hanging
- Education: University of Bristol (BA); University of Birmingham (MA)
- Occupation: Playwright
- Writing career
- Language: English
- Notable works: Blasted (1995); Skin (1995); Phaedra's Love (1996); Crave (1998); 4.48 Psychosis (2000)
- Movement: In-yer-face theatre

Sarah Kane (3 February 1971 – 20 February 1999) was an English playwright. She was known for her plays that deal with themes of redemptive love, sexual desire, pain, torture—both physical and psychological—and death. They are characterised by a poetic intensity, pared-down language, exploration of theatrical form and, in her earlier work, the use of extreme and violent stage action.

Kane herself and scholars of her work, such as Graham Saunders, have identified some of her inspirations as expressionist theatre and Jacobean tragedy. The critic Aleks Sierz saw her work as part of a confrontational style and sensibility of drama termed "in-yer-face theatre". Sierz originally called Kane "the quintessential in-yer-face writer of the [1990s]" but later remarked in 2009 that although he initially "thought she was very typical of the new writing of the middle 1990s", "[t]he further we get away from that in time, the more un-typical she seems to be".

Kane's published work consists of five plays, the short film Skin, and two newspaper articles for The Guardian.

== Life and career ==
Born in Brentwood, Essex, and raised by evangelical parents, Kane was a committed Christian in adolescence. Later, however, she rejected those beliefs. After attending Shenfield High School, she studied drama at Bristol University, graduating in 1992, and went on to take an MA course in play writing at the University of Birmingham, led by the playwright David Edgar.

She praised Jeremy Weller's Mad as "the one piece of theatre that changed my life".

Kane wrote consistently throughout her adult life. For a year, she was writer-in-residence for Paines Plough, a theatre company promoting new writing, where she actively encouraged other writers. Before that, she had worked briefly as literary associate for the Bush Theatre, London.

=== Career as a playwright ===
Kane originally wanted to be a poet, but decided that she was unable to convey her thoughts and feelings through poetry. She wrote that she was attracted to the stage because "theatre has no memory, which makes it the most existential of the arts. No doubt that is why I keep coming back in the hope that someone in a dark room somewhere will show me an image that burns itself into my mind".

=== Blasted ===
Kane's first play was Blasted. Kane wrote the first two scenes while a student in Birmingham, where they were given a public performance. The agent Mel Kenyon was in the audience and subsequently represented Kane, suggesting she should show her work to the Royal Court Theatre in London. The completed play, directed by James Macdonald, opened at the Royal Court Theatre Upstairs in 1995. The action is set in a room of a luxurious hotel in Leeds where Ian, a racist and foul-mouthed middle-aged journalist, tries to seduce Cate, an innocent, simple-minded young woman. From its opening in a naturalistic—though troubling—world, the play takes on different, nightmarish dimensions when a soldier, armed with a sniper's rifle, appears in the room. The narrative ultimately breaks into a series of increasingly disturbing short scenes. Its scenes of anal rape, cannibalism, and other forms of brutality, created one of the biggest theatre scandals in London since Edward Bond's Saved in 1965. Kane admired Bond's work, and he in turn publicly defended Kane's play and talent. Other dramatists whom Kane particularly liked and who could be seen as influences include Samuel Beckett, Howard Barker, and Georg Büchner, whose play Woyzeck she later directed (Gate Theatre, London 1997).

Blasted was fiercely attacked in the British press. Blasted was, however, praised by fellow playwrights Martin Crimp, Harold Pinter (who became a friend), and Caryl Churchill, who considered it "rather a tender play". It was later seen to be making parallels between domestic violence and the war in Bosnia, and between emotional and physical violence. Kane said, "The logical conclusion of the attitude that produces an isolated rape in England is the rape camps in Bosnia and the logical conclusion to the way society expects men to behave is war." Blasted was produced again in 2001 at the Royal Court. The assistant director of this production, Joseph Hill-Gibbins, suggests that "The argument is made through form, through the shifts in styles in Blasted. That's how she constructs the argument, by taking this setting in an English Northern industrial town and suddenly transporting the action to a war zone." The critical realism that the first scene sets up is "literally blasted apart" in Scene Two. The critic Ken Urban says that "for Kane, hell is not metaphysical: it is hyperreal, reality magnified".

=== Skin ===
Skin was an eleven-minute film written for Channel 4, a British TV station, depicting a violent relationship between a black woman and a racist skinhead. It was first shown at the London Film Festival in October 1995 and televised by Channel 4 in 1997. The film is directed by Vincent O'Connell and stars Ewen Bremner, Marcia Rose, Yemi Ajibade and James Bannon.

=== Phaedra's Love ===
Kane was then commissioned by the Gate Theatre, London, to write a play inspired by a classic text. Phaedra's Love was loosely based on the classical dramatist Seneca's play Phaedra, but given a contemporary setting. In this reworking of the myth of Phaedra's doomed love for her stepson Hippolytus, it is Hippolytus, rather than Phaedra, who takes the central role. It is Hippolytus' emotional cruelty which pushes Phaedra to suicide. Kane reversed classical tradition by showing, rather than describing, violent action on stage. The play contains some of Kane's wittiest and most cynical dialogue. Kane described it as "my comedy". Directed by Kane, it was first performed at the Gate Theatre in 1996.

=== Cleansed ===
Cleansed premiered at the Royal Court's theatre downstairs in April 1998, and was directed by James Macdonald. This was at the time the most expensive production in the Royal Court's history. Kane stated that the play was partly inspired from reading a part of Roland Barthes's work A Lover's Discourse where "[Barthes] says the situation of a rejected lover is not unlike the situation of a prisoner in Dachau." Cleansed is set in what Kane in her stage directions described as a "university" but which functions more as a torture chamber or concentration camp, overseen by the sadistic Tinker. It places a young woman and her brother, a disturbed boy, a gay couple and a peepshow dancer within this world of extreme cruelty in which declarations of love are viciously tested. It pushes the limits of what can be realised in the theatre: stage directions include "a sunflower pushes through the floor and grows above their heads" and "the rats carry Carl's feet away". The play was presented at the National Theatre in London in 2016, the first time any of Kane's work had been performed there.

=== Crave ===
A change in critical opinion occurred with Kane's fourth play, Crave, which was directed by Vicky Featherstone and presented by Paines Plough at the Traverse Theatre in Edinburgh in 1998. The play was performed under the pseudonym of Marie Kelvedon, partly because the notion amused Kane, but also so that the play could be viewed without the taint of its author's notorious reputation. "Marie" was Kane's middle name and she was brought up in the town of Kelvedon Hatch in Essex.

Crave marks a break from the on-stage violence of Kane's previous works and a move to a freer, sometimes lyrical writing style, at times inspired by her reading of the Bible and T. S. Eliot's The Waste Land. It has four characters, each identified only by a letter of the alphabet. It dispenses with plot and unlike her earlier work, with its highly specific stage directions, gives no indication what actions, if any, the actors should perform on stage, nor does it give any setting for the play. As such, it may have been influenced by Martin Crimp's 1997 play Attempts on Her Life, which similarly dispenses with setting and overall narrative. Kane had written of her admiration for Crimp's formal innovations. The work is highly intertextual. At the time, Kane regarded it as the "most despairing" of her plays, written when she had lost "faith in love".

=== 4.48 Psychosis ===
Her last play, 4.48 Psychosis, was completed shortly before she committed suicide and was performed in 2000, at the Royal Court, directed by James Macdonald. This, Kane's shortest and most fragmented theatrical work, dispenses with plot and character, and no indication is given as to how many actors were intended to voice the play. Written at a time when Kane was suffering from severe depression, it has been described by her fellow-playwright and friend David Greig as having as its subject the "psychotic mind". According to Greig, the title derives from the time—4:48a.m.—when Kane, in her depressed state, frequently woke in the morning.

== Depression and suicide ==
Kane struggled with severe depression for many years and was twice voluntarily admitted to the Maudsley Hospital in London.

She took antidepressants with reluctance. According to Kane's agent, Mel Kenyon, Kane told her "she didn't like taking pills because they numbed her response to the world, which is, of course, what they're supposed to do. But as an artist, it's extraordinarily difficult if your responsive level is made less intense. What do you do? Take pills and take away the despair? But despair also engenders knowledge in some way, and that knowledge fuels your understanding of the world and therefore your writing, but at the same time you want to exorcise the despair. She tried to weigh it up all the time."

Whilst talking about how her play Phaedra's Love deals with the theme of depression, Kane said that "[t]hrough being very, very low comes an ability to live in the moment because there isn't anything else. What do you do if you feel the truth is behind you? Many people feel depression is about emptiness but actually it's about being so full that everything cancels itself out. You can't have faith without doubt, and what are you left with when you can't have love without hate?"

=== First suicide attempt and hospitalisation ===
In the early hours of 17 February 1999, Kane attempted suicide in her Brixton flat by consuming 50 sleeping pills and over 150 antidepressant tablets. Her flatmate, David Gibson, awoke and found a suicide note from her, stating that he was not to enter her room. Ignoring this request, Gibson entered Kane's room where he found her to be unconscious.

Kane was then taken to London's King's College Hospital where she was resuscitated and assessed by two psychiatrists. One of the psychiatrists, Nigel Tunstall, said that "it was very clearly the case that [Kane] was intending to kill herself and she was surprised and upset that she had not succeeded" and that she "said she had no intention of killing herself while she remained at King's College Hospital, but in abstract terms she said that at some point she would certainly kill herself." Because of this, Dr Tunstall ordered that Kane should be detained under the Mental Health Act if she attempted to leave the hospital.

Kane was admitted to the Brunel ward of the King's College Hospital, which was a general ward and not a psychiatric wing.

While in hospital, she was visited by her agent Mel Kenyon. Kane told Kenyon that she survived her attempted suicide by overdose because she had eaten pizza. Kenyon recalled that when she visited Kane "She was extraordinary. She looked happy, healthy. She was very funny. She was brimming with self confidence. I took her 200 cigarettes which we hid under the bed. We talked about everything under the sun. We did talk about suicide. We did talk about God. We did talk about plays. We did talk about friendship.[…] And then after I had given her the fags I just kissed her on her forehead and I said 'I love you' and she said 'I love you too' and that was the last time I saw her."

=== Suicide ===
Shortly after 3:30a.m. on 20 February, a nurse discovered that Kane was not in her hospital bed. The nurse forced open the door to the Brunel ward's toilets where she found Kane's dead body. Kane had hanged herself by her neck with her own shoelaces from the hook on the inside of the toilet door. She was 28 years old when she died. At the inquest into her death, it was stated that she probably died within three minutes.

=== Coroners court inquest ===
An inquest was held at Southwark coroner's court to determine the circumstances that resulted in Kane's death.

The coroner delivered a verdict of death by suicide. The coroner commented that Kane "was plagued with mental anguish and tormented by thoughts of suicide" and that she "made her choice and she made it at a time when she was suffering from a depressive illness [and while] the balance of her mind was disturbed".

The inquest heard how Kane had not been observed by nurses between 2am and 3:30am on 20 February, which was the timeframe when she left her room in the hospital and went to the toilets where she killed herself. One of the psychiatrists who assessed Kane, Dr Nigel Tunstall, told the inquest how he "took it as read" that Kane would be "constantly observed" by nurses because of the notes from psychiatrist Dr Sedza Mujic who had also assessed Kane. However, nurses were unaware that Kane needed continuous supervision. Dr Tunstall also wrote in his notes that Kane did not require one-to-one care from a psychiatric nurse. It was stated that one of the reasons this was not requested was because it was felt that such a measure could be counter-productive, as Kane was ambivalent towards psychiatric treatment.

A review panel that investigated Kane's death recommended that the communication between medical staff be improved by formalising the procedures that related to the risk assessment of patients. However, a spokesperson from the hospital said that none of these procedures would have prevented her death.

After the inquest Sarah Kane's father, Peter Kane, considered taking legal action against the hospital for "criminal negligence". He stated that "The hospital has admitted there was not enough communication between the doctors of these departments and the nurses" and that "I am not seeking financial compensation for the death of my daughter. I want answers as to why she was not given proper care in order that this does not happen to somebody else's daughter."

=== Responses to Kane's death ===
It has been reported that in response to Kane's death there was a minute's silence held on radio in Germany and that theatres in the country dimmed their lights as a mark of respect.

Kane's agent, Mel Kenyon, stated that "I don't think she was depressed, It was deeper than that. I think she felt something more like existential despair – which is what makes many artists tick." Kenyon's words were challenged by playwright Anthony Neilson who in a letter to The Guardian wrote that "No one in despair "ticks"" and that "Truth didn't kill her, lies did: the lies of worthlessness and futility whispered by an afflicted brain". Neilson suggested that Kane's depression was the result of "crazy and irregular tides of chemicals that crash through the brain" and that "Far from enhancing talent these neurological storms waste time, narrow vision and frequently lead, as here, to that most tragic, most selfish actions".

Eight days after Kane's death, The Independent published an essay written by Paul Gordon titled "You don't have to be suicidal to be an artist, and it doesn't help". In the essay, Gordon commented on the negative impact of how "our culture romanticises creativity and depression". He wrote that "The tragic suicide of the young playwright Sarah Kane is already finding its place in the mythology of the creative depressive: the artist - young or old, but preferably young - who creates public beauty out of personal suffering." He concluded his piece writing that "Only those who knew Sarah Kane personally can mourn her. Perhaps the rest of us could be less in thrall to the romantic ideas of which her death is prey and think more of the thousands of "nameless" suicides whose deaths each year shames us, as individuals and as a society."

The playwright Harold Pinter knew Kane personally and remarked how he was not surprised to hear the news of her suicide: "She talked about it a great deal. She just said it was on the cards, you know, and I had to say, 'Come on! For God's sake!' I remember a line in [her play] Crave: 'Death is my lover, and he wants to move in.' That's quite a line, isn't it? She felt man's inhumanity to man so profoundly. I believe that's what finally killed her. She couldn't stand the bloody thing any more." Pinter spoke at Kane's memorial and is reported to have just said the following four words: "She was a poet".

The artistic director of The Bush Theatre, Dominic Dromgoole, had previously known Kane when she was the theatre's literary associate. Dromgoole wrote that Kane's death "left a long black cloud hanging over many. A huge amount of anger was felt. Anger at her for robbing us of what we so loved. Anger at those who maltreated her. […] anger directed inward for failing to help her." Dromgoole wrote that he was angry with how Kane had been mistreated by others. He stated that this anger was not aimed at "the press" who he saw as being "held up so easily as scapegoats" but rather it was directed at "certain people in the profession" who he claimed to have taken advantage of her: "There were a lot of timid souls who dared not, who forced Sarah to dare on their behalf. She enacted their fantasies of outrage for them. There is always one child in the class who will do the things others fear to. That is what marks them out, their courage, and their will. The good friends of that child will help her to harness it for her own benefit. The bad friends will use it as a form of entertainment. 'Go on, jump over that', 'Say that to the bully', 'Go on cut yourself'. Sarah was that child, and where some reined her back, others let her go, even encouraged her." He also said that "We all behaved a bit strangely after Sarah's death. It awoke old despairs, and morbidities, and adolescent terrors."

The playwright Edward Bond knew Kane personally and had some correspondence with her. Bond has referred to Kane's suicide in various essays he has written about theatre. In an essay from 1999 (revised in 2000), Bond wrote "Sarah Kane had to confront the implacable. You can postpone the confrontation only when you are certain that at some time it will take place. Otherwise, it will slip away. Everything Sarah Kane did had authority. If she thought that perhaps the confrontation could not take place in our theatre, because it was losing the understanding and the means – she could not risk waiting. Instead, she staged it elsewhere. Her means to confront the implacable are death, a lavatory and shoelaces. They are her comment on the meaningless of our theatre and our lives, and on our own false gods." In 2000, Bond wrote that "Her suicide has to be understood. She was the most gifted dramatist of her generation. It is said that she killed herself because she was clinically depressed. What does that mean of a writer? Not that her death had a cause, but that her life had no inducement. She saw no future for theatre and so none for herself. But it is possible to see such a future for theatre. Her plays present the need for such a theatre." In 2021, Bond wrote "[Kane] had personal problems but she was destroyed by the theatre industry. Drama had been her umbilical lifeline but the theatre industry tuned it into the rope with which she hanged herself."

== Reception and legacy ==
In 1998, Kane was included in the Evening Standard's list of 'London's Top 100 women', which was a list of "The most influential women in the capital". In the same year, she was also featured in the newspaper's list of "London's fifty brightest young things".

In 1999, she was one of the recipients of the V Europe Prize Theatrical Realities awarded to the Royal Court Theatre (with Mark Ravenhill, Jez Butterworth, Conor McPherson, Martin McDonagh).

Though Kane's work never played to large audiences in the UK and was at first dismissed by many newspaper critics, her plays have been widely performed in Europe, Australia and South America. In 2005, the theatre director Dominic Dromgoole wrote that she was "without doubt the most performed new writer on the international circuit". Fellow playwright Mark Ravenhill has said her plays "have almost certainly achieved canonical status". At one point in Germany, there were 17 simultaneous productions of her work. In November 2010, the theatre critic Ben Brantley of the New York Times described the SoHo Rep's "shattering production" of Kane's Blasted (which had opened two years previously) as "one of the most important New York premieres of the decade".

In December 2011, the playwright David Eldridge wrote that "For any playwright of my generation the spirit and experiential theatre of Sarah Kane casts a long shadow. Sarah believed passionately that form ought to be expressive and carry meaning as powerfully as the story of a play. Blasted markedly influenced my adaptation of the film Festen for the stage".

Playwright Robert Askins, who received a 2015 Tony Award nomination for Best Play for Hand to God, has cited Kane as a major inspiration.

In Ukraine, director Roza Sarkisyan chose to produce an excerpt of one of Kane's plays for the British Council in 2017, and cites Kane as an inspiration.

== Works ==
Plays

- Blasted (1995)
- Phaedra's Love (1996)
- Cleansed (1998)
- Crave (1998)
- 4.48 Psychosis (1999)

Screenplays

- Skin (1995)

Anthologies

- Sarah Kane: Complete Plays. London: Methuen (2001), ISBN 0-413-74260-1

== See also ==
- List of British playwrights since 1950
- List of atheists in film, radio, television and theatre
