= Phaedra's Love =

1996 play by Sarah Kane

- Cover of the Methuen edition
- Written by: Sarah Kane
- Characters: Hippolytus; Phaedra; Strophe; Theseus; Doctor; Priest; Crowd
- Original language: English
- Subject: Violence, sexuality
- Setting: The palace of Theseus

Premiere
- Date premiered: 15 May 1996
- Place premiered: Gate Theatre, London

Phaedra's Love is a play by British playwright Sarah Kane. It was first performed in 1996 at London's Gate Theatre, directed by the author. The play is a modern adaptation of Seneca's Phaedra. The play explores the brutal nature of love, social relations, nihilism and belief through the example of an affair between a queen and her stepson.

It centres more on Hippolytus (the original focuses more on Phaedra), who is rendered lazy and cynical by his upbringing as the son of King Theseus. Unlike classical drama, most of the violent action happens on stage rather than off.

Kane described Phaedra's Love as "my comedy".

== Plot ==
The play opens with Hippolytus cleaning semen and snot with socks that are lying about his room. He is described as 'fat' and his room is in disarray. Shortly thereafter Phaedra, his step-mother, is talking to a doctor about Hippolytus's wellbeing. The doctor deduces Phaedra's romantic affection for her step-son and warns her against consummating her affection. She confides in her daughter, Strophe, who likewise warns Phaedra against pursuing an affair with Hippolytus. Phaedra approaches Hippolytus, regardless of the warnings she has heard. Hippolytus openly speaks about his multiple sexual partners and reinforces how he doesn't care for any of them and won't care for Phaedra. Phaedra confesses her love for him, but he spurns her, telling her she will only be hurt. She then proceeds to perform fellatio on him. He is initially unresponsive, but when he reaches his climax he asserts himself in the act. During the interaction Hippolytus informs Phaedra that he has had sex with his step-sister, Strophe, and that Strophe, Phaedra's biological daughter, has also had sex with Theseus, Phaedra's husband and Hippolytus's father. It is later revealed that Strophe had sex with Theseus on the night Theseus and Phaedra were married. Afterwards, Phaedra kills herself, leaving behind a note that states Hippolytus has raped her. Strophe confronts Hippolytus about the accusation, but he refuses to deny or confirm the allegation, though the subtext implies that he did not. Whilst in prison, Hippolytus speaks with a priest who eventually performs fellatio on Hippolytus. In the final sequence Theseus has returned home and disguises himself in a crowd. Strophe, unbeknownst to Theseus, has done the same. She publicly defends Hippolytus and Theseus responds by raping and killing her. The enraged mob rips Hippolytus limb from limb, and his father disembowels him. Afterwards, when Theseus sees the corpses, he realizes that it was Strophe who he had just raped and killed and expresses regret before cutting his own throat. The play ends as a vulture flies down to consume the corpse of Hippolytus.

== Bibliography ==
- Kane, Sarah, Sarah Kane: Complete Plays. London: Methuen (2001), ISBN 0-413-74260-1
