= List of alumni of Saint Martin's School of Art =

This is a list of notable people who studied at Saint Martin's School of Art from its foundation in 1854 up to the time of its amalgamation with the Central School of Art and Design in 1989.

== A ==
- Alan Aboud
- Ruth Abrahams
- Jane Ackroyd
- Sade Adu
- Maurice Agis
- Joe Allen (painter)
- Martin Asbury
- Michael Attree
- Mabel Lucie Attwell
- Frank Auerbach

== B ==
- Jeff Banks
- Jonathan Barnbrook
- Lionel Bart
- Pauline Baumann
- Cressida Bell
- Zadok Ben-David
- Simon Bill
- Sandra Blow
- Brian Bourke
- Hamish Bowles
- Helene Brandt
- Nick Brandt
- Roland Brener
- Pierce Brosnan
- Robert Buhler
- John Bunting (sculptor)
- Jim Burns
- James Butler (artist)

== C ==
- Mel Calman
- Stephen Cartwright
- Billy Childish
- Alison Chitty
- Jarvis Cocker
- William Constable (designer)
- Richard Cook (painter born 1947)
- Cressida Cowell
- Roderick Coyne
- Jack Crabtree (artist)
- Edward Cronshaw
- Stan Cross
- Stephen Chambers

== D ==
- Dexter Dalwood
- Richard Deacon (sculptor)
- Len Deighton
- Braco Dimitrijević
- Peter Doig
- Eric Doitch
- Arthur Dooley
- Barry Driscoll
- Violet Hilda Drummond, author and illustrator
- William Dudley (designer)
- Keanan Duffty
- Brian Duffy (photographer)

== E ==
- Benni Efrat
- Afi Ekong
- Clifford Ellis
- John Ernest

== F ==
- Mick Farren
- Micheal Farrell
- Stephen Farthing
- Sheila Fell
- Ronald Ferns
- Michael ffolkes
- Tim Flach
- Barry Flanagan
- Dennis Flanders
- Eva Frankfurther
- Barnett Freedman
- Hamish Fulton

== G ==
- George Gale (cartoonist)
- Abram Games
- Dudu Gerstein
- Bill Gibb
- Gilbert & George
- Darla Jane Gilroy
- Sybil Mullen Glover
- Antony Gormley
- Andrew Grassie
- Pamela Green
- Carla Guelfenbein

== H ==
- Francesca von Habsburg
- Z'ev ben Shimon Halevi
- Donald Hamilton Fraser
- Richard Hamilton (artist)
- Katharine Hamnett
- Tony Harding
- David Harrison (artist)
- Tim Head
- Gerard Hemsworth
- Nicholas Hely Hutchinson
- Albert Herbert
- Richard Heslop
- Peter Hide
- John Hilliard (artist)
- Bobby Hillson
- Paul Hogarth
- Ruth Horam
- Albert Houthuesen
- Barbara Howard (artist)
- John Hurt
- Keith Holland

== I ==
- Bryan Ingham

== J ==
- Chaz Jankel
- Catherine Johnson (novelist)
- Janet and Anne Grahame Johnstone
- Dylan Jones
- Joy Farrall Jones
- Stephen Jones (milliner)
- Isaac Julien

== K ==
- Menashe Kadishman
- Phillip King (artist)
- Linda Kitson
- Leon Kossoff

== L ==
- Gerald Laing
- Peter Lasko
- Amanda Lear
- Doris Lindner
- Julia Lockheart
- Richard Long (artist)

== M ==
- Anne Magill
- Edna Manley
- Frank Marcus
- Glen Matlock
- Bruce McLean
- Margaret Mee
- Alicia Melamed Adams
- Kobena Mercer
- Ian Miller (illustrator)
- Lisa Milroy
- Richard G. Mitchell
- Bruno Monguzzi
- Fernando Montes
- Henry Moon
- Mona Moore

== O ==
- Bruce Oldfield
- Olly and Suzi
- Thérèse Oulton
- Rifat Özbek

== P ==
- Jenny Packham
- Eduardo Paolozzi
- George Passmore (sculptor)
- Dave Pearson (painter)
- Charles Peattie
- A. R. Philpott
- Carl Plate
- Platon (photographer)
- Sandy Powell (costume designer)
- Matt Pritchett
- Gilbert Prousch
- The Puppini Sisters
- Stephen Pusey

== R ==
- Shani Rhys James
- Lancelot Ribeiro
- Paul Richards (artist)
- Ray Richardson (artist)
- Philip Ridley
- William Roberts (painter)
- Ron Robertson-Swann
- Claudia Roden
- Meg Rosoff
- Frank Runacres
- Craig Richards (DJ)

== S ==
- Elisabeth Sakellariou
- Rashad Salim
- Philip Sallon
- Mangala Samaraweera
- Gerald Scarfe
- Buky Schwartz
- Tim Scott (artist)
- Nick Sharratt
- Jack Smith (artist)
- Kenneth Snowman
- Carole Steyn

== T ==
- Patrick Thomas (graphic artist)
- Frank Tovey
- William G. Tucker
- Yoko Terauchi

== V ==
- Paul Vanstone

== W ==
- Hanna Weil
- Sophia Wellbeloved
- John Wells (artist)
- Jim Whiting
- Isaac Witkin
- Carol Wyatt
- Cerith Wyn Evans

== Y ==
- Emily Young
- Esme Young

== Z ==
- Philip Zec
