= Abboud =

aboud
- Language: Arabic

Abboud, Aboud, or `Ābūd (Arabic: عابود) is an Arabic nickname to any Arabic name that starts with Abdul Abdel Abdal (e.g. Abdallah, Abdelrahman). Instances include:

Given name

- Aboud El Zomor (born 1948), Egyptian general
- Aboud Jumbe (1920 – 2016), Zanzibari politician
- Aboud Omar (born 1992), Kenyan footballer
- Abboud Qanbar (born 1945), Iraqi General
- Aboud Rogo (1968 – 2012), Kenyan Muslim cleric
- Aboud Yasin aka Abdul Rahman Yasin (born 1960), Iraqi-American suspect in the 1993 World Trade Center bombing

Surname

- Ahmed Aboud (born 1970), Iraqi Olympic boxer
- Fuhad Abdallah Abboud (born 1967), Lebanese/French, Ecuadorian Hollywood Film Maker, Automotive Collector and Designer
- Alan Aboud (born 1966), Irish graphic designer
- Aline Abboud (born 1988), German journalist
- Chris Abboud (born 1956), American politician from Nebraska
- Dick Aboud (1941–2000), Canadian football player
- Élie Aboud (born 1959), French-Lebanese politician and doctor
- Fadi Abboud (born 1955), Lebanese businessman and politician
- Farid Abboud (born 1951), Lebanese diplomat
- Fathi Aboud (born 1964), Libyan triple jumper
- Ghassan Aboud (born 1967), Syrian entrepreneur and philanthropist
- Hassan Aboud (died 2014), Syrian opposition leader
- Ibrahim Abboud (1900–1983), Sudanese president
- Ibrahim Aboud (born 1987), arrested in the 2006 Toronto terrorism case
- James Aboud (born 1956), Trinidad and Tobago High Court judge and poet
- John Aboud (born 1973), American writer and comedian
- Joseph Abboud (born 1950), American fashion designer and author
- Jumana Emil Abboud (born 1971), Palestinian artist
- Kamel Abboud (born 1961), Algerian boxer
- Layal Abboud (born 1982) Lebanese singer
- Mario Abboud (born 1981), Lebanese basketball center
- Mark Abboud (born 1970) American soccer player
- Maroun Abboud (1886–1962), Lebanese poet
- Michel Abboud (born 1977), Lebanese-born architect and artist
- Patrick Bou Abboud (born 1987), Lebanese basketball player
- Paula Aboud (born 1950), U.S. politician, Arizona Senate member
- Rabah Aboud (born 1981), Algerian runner
- Sadoon Abboud (born 1967), Iraqi boxer
- Samir Aboud (born 1972), Libyan football goalkeeper
- Sari Abboud aka Massari (born 1980), Lebanese Canadian R&B/pop singer
- Shafic Abboud (1926–2004), Lebanese painter
- Shawqi Aboud (1927–2008), Iraqi coach

Al-Aboud surname

- Abdulrahman Al-Aboud (born 1995), Saudi Arabian footballer
- Fadel Al-Aboud (1872–1936), head of the Haj Fadel government in eastern Syria
- Khaled Al-Aboud (born 1990), Saudi Arabian footballer

Middle name

- Abdelwahid Aboud Mackaye (born 1953), Chadian insurgent leader
- Salah Aboud Mahmoud (1942–2024), Iraqi Army general

Placename

- Abud, Oman
- Abboud, Palestine
- Abboud Building, a building located in al-Rasheed Street in Baghdad, Iraq
- Abu Abud, Nasar Rural District, Arvandkenar District, Abadan County, Khuzestan Province, Iran
- Ras Abu Aboud, district in Doha, Qatar
- Sheykh Abud, Kushk-e Hezar Rural District, Beyza District, Sepidan County, Fars Province, Iran

== See also ==
- Abd (Arabic)
- Abud (disambiguation)
- Al-Abud Network, insurgent group in the Iraq War
