= Leicester Square Theatre =

British theatre in London, England

- Notre Dame Hall; Cavern in the Town; The Venue
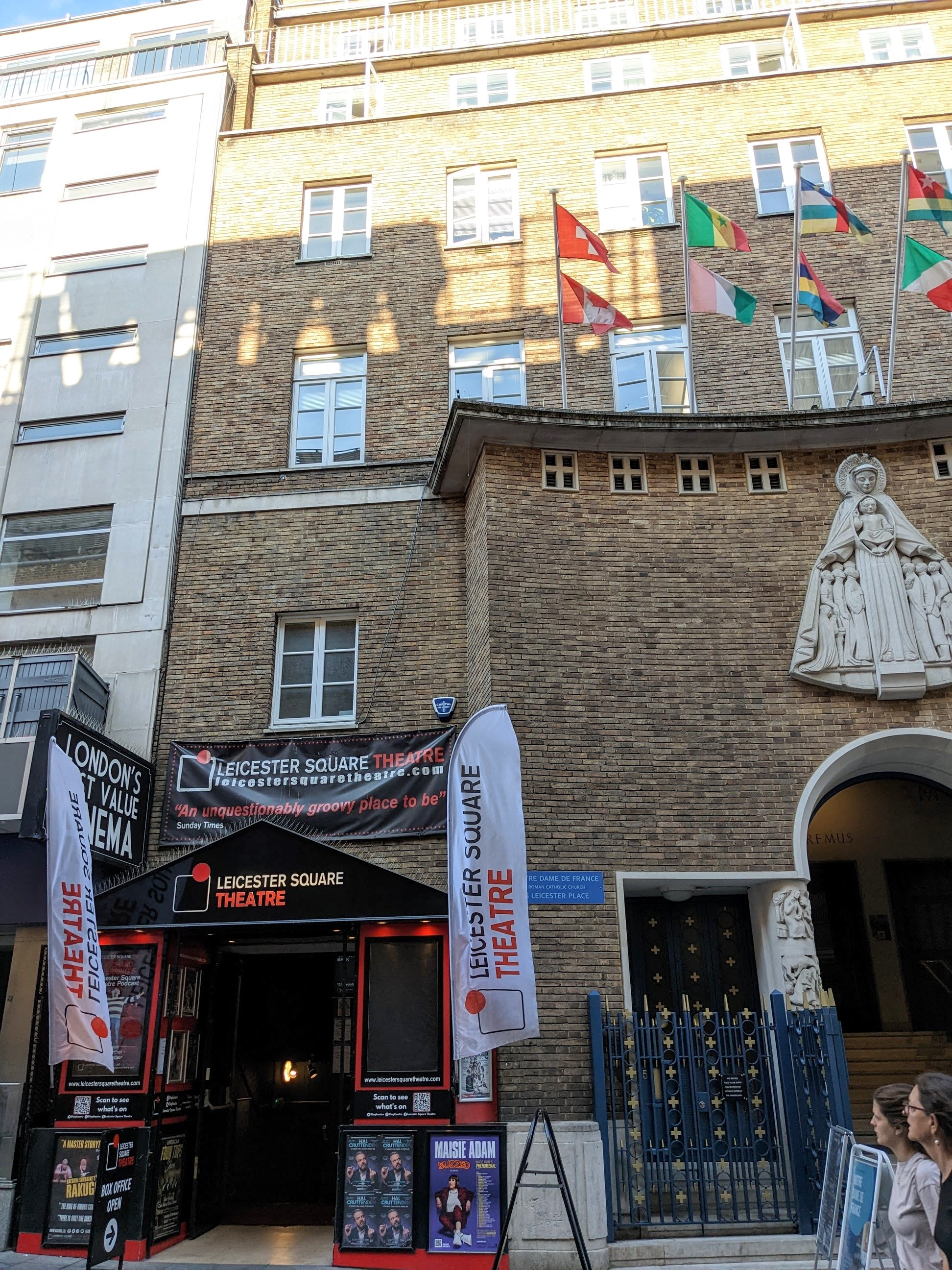
- Interactive map of Leicester Square Theatre
- Address: Leicester Place; London, WC2; United Kingdom
- Coordinates: 51.5103°N 0.1303°W
- Owner: London International Arts Theatre
- Capacity: 400 seats
- Type: Off-West End
- Public transit: Leicester Square

Construction
- Opened: 1953; 73 years ago

Website
- www.leicestersquaretheatre.com

The Leicester Square Theatre is a 400-seat theatre in Leicester Place, immediately north of Leicester Square, in the City of Westminster, London. It was previously known as Notre Dame Hall, Cavern in the Town and The Venue. The theatre hosts stand-up comedy, cabaret, music, plays and comedies.

== History ==
The building originated as the Notre Dame Hall in 1953, replacing an earlier building that had been destroyed by World War II bombing, and part of the rebuild of the adjacent Notre Dame de France church; the hall was used as a French cultural centre for a time. It became a popular music venue in the 1960s under the name Cavern in the Town, regularly hosting beat music group the Small Faces. It was renamed Notre Dame Hall in the 1970s and presented the Rolling Stones and the Who, but specialised in punk music, hosting such acts as the Sex Pistols. In 1979, the Clash previewed material from London Calling here shortly before recording the album. In the mid-90s, Notre Dame Hall hosted The Halloween Society's monthly events, which featured short films, variety acts, live music and cabaret. In 2001, it was converted to a theatre and named The Venue.

Productions at The Venue included the world premiere of the Boy George musical Taboo, which had a highly successful run in 2002 before transferring to Broadway, and Round the Horne ... Revisited (2004-05).

In 2008, the theatre was under new ownership and underwent refurbishment of the auditorium and bars. It reopened in August that year as the Leicester Square Theatre. The opening season included American comedian Joan Rivers making her acting debut with her play Joan Rivers: A Work in Progress by a Life in Progress, which played a total of 75 performances to celebrate her birthday. A musical based on the comic strip Alex, by Charles Peattie and Russell Taylor, starring Robert Bathurst, finished the year 2008.

The theatre launched its New Comedian of the Year competition in 2009. This competition has seen many well-known acts come through to become finalists, including Rob Beckett, Rachel Parris, Dane Baptiste, Sofie Hagen, Tim Renkow, Joby Mageean, Bilal Zafar and Tez Ilyas. It is regarded as one of the best New Comedian competitions and has given rise to the Not So New Comedian Competition and Sketch Off, both at the theatre's sister venue, the Museum of Comedy at St. George's, Bloomsbury.

The theatre has subsequently been host to many comedians, including Al Murray, Michael McIntyre, Arabella Weir, Dave Chappelle, Ed Gamble, Janey Godley, Jerry Sadowitz, Jim Gaffigan, Tim Vine, Mark Thomas, Michelle Wolf, Micky Flanagan, Rachel Parris, Hal Cruttenden, Ruby Wax, Sean Lock, Tom Stade, and Jim Jefferies. Theatre shows have included Tiddler, Scarecrows Wedding, Private Peaceful, An Evening With Joan Collins, and Musik (the Pet Shop Boys musical). Music has been performed by Blake, Mark Kingswood, Macy Gray, Buddy Greco, Joe Longthorne, Hazel O'Connor and Boy George.

Performers who have returned regularly to the venue include Ricky Gervais, Frank Skinner, Frankie Boyle, Henning Wehn, Bill Bailey, Stacey Kent, and Stewart Lee. Richard Herring records his live podcast there, titled, Richard Herring's Leicester Square Theatre Podcast, featuring well-known comedians, actors and musicians. The theatre has a long-standing relationship with the children's theatre show Stick Man, which has been a regular feature for some years over the festive season.

The theatre is owned and managed by artistic director Martin Witts.
