= Jaysh Muhammad al-Fatih =

Iraqi militant group

- جيش محمد الفاتح
- Leader: Moayad Ahmed Yasseen (2003–2004)
- Dates active: 2003–2011; 2014–2017
- Ideology: Sunni Islamism; Iraqi nationalism Saddamism; Anti-Zionism
- Wars: Iraq War

Jaysh Muhammad al-Fatih (Arabic: جيش محمد الفاتح, romanized: Jaysh Muḥammad al-Fātiḥ, lit. 'Army of Muhammad the Conqueror') was an Iraqi militant group that is both politically and religiously motivated. The politically motivated faction within JM was primarily made up of former Ba'athist members mainly from the Sunni region. Many of the people who had enjoyed a special status during the leadership of Saddam Hussein, were from Tikrit, which is in turn within an area of Iraq where the Arab population is mostly Sunni. People who generally hold the ex-vice-president, Izzat Ibrahim ad-Douri, in exceptionally high esteem were members of the security, intelligence and police forces from the previous government.

Jaysh Muhammad al-Fatih was initially believed to consist of fighters who had infiltrated Iraq from Saudi Arabia and other Arab countries. Later it was reported by the Iraq Survey Group, that membership appears to be primarily of Iraqi citizens, former regime officers. This was supported by their ability to use a pre-war information network and supply infrastructure. The JM was responsible for sophisticated attacks on Coalition forces during early 2004, assisted by former intelligence and security officers.

== Attacks ==
On August 19, 2003, a masked man claiming to speak for the Islamic Jihad Brigades of Muhammad's Army, Abdallah Bin-Iyad Brigade, took responsibility for the a bombing at the UN compound in Baghdad through an audiotape provided to Lebanon's LBC satellite television. A group calling itself the Armed Vanguards of the Second Muhammad Army claimed responsibility for the bombing of the UN headquarters in Baghdad, The claim took the form of a typewritten, Arabic statement shown on the Al-Arabiya station on August 21, 2003.

On January 31, 2004, men with their faces covered circulated a declaration in Fallujah outlining their plan for taking control of Iraqi cities after the US occupation forces withdraw. The declaration was signed by 12 organizations and groups including: The Iraqi Islamic Patriotic Resistance (al-Muqawamah al-Wataniyah al-Islamiyah al-'Iraqiyah), the Salafi Movement for Propagation and Jihad (al-Harakah as-Salafiyah li-d-Da'wah wa-l-Jihad), the al-Qari'ah Organization (Tanzim al-Qari'ah), the Army of Partisans of the Sunnah (Jaysh Ansar as-Sunnah), and the Army of Muhammad.

An anonymous interview with a member of Jaysh Muhammad from Ba'qubah gave to the Institute for War and Peace Reporting was published on May 14, 2004. The insurgent stated that the majority of Jaysh Muhammad al-Fatih combatants are farmer workers who joined the Salafist Sunni movement to drive the coalition from Iraq. He said there were only a few foreign fighters in the group and that they had "lived with us [before the war] and did not come from abroad after the war." He denied that the group, which he described as not Wahhabi, is linked to Al-Qaeda. He also claimed that the group received no funding from abroad, but that it is funded "from honorable and good people in this country." He said that Jaysh Muhammad al-Fatih opposed the Iraqi Governing Council because it was not elected, and since so many of the Council members were exiles. "They do not understand Iraqis' suffering and Arab traditions. [They] were distorted by the Western life they lived," he said. He also claimed that his group is affiliated with an Islamic political party, but declined to identify which party, only to say that it is not the Iraqi Islamic Party. While he denied the group targeted Iraq police officers, he condoned the kidnapping of foreigners, saying that "kidnapping is an obligation." He also said: "There is no real United Nations. It is an organization completely controlled by the United States and its resolutions always serve U.S. interests."

In November 2004 during Operation Phantom Fury, the U.S. staged a large scale assault on Fallujah and captured Moayad Ahmed Yasseen, the leader of Jaysh Muhammad al-Fatih. Yasseen while under detention of the Coalition soldiers confessed to seeking aid from the Iranian government and having contacts with Iranian intelligence officers. Yasseen was a former colonel in Saddam Hussein's army. Yaseen went on to state Iranian officials provided money, weapons "and as far as I know even car bombs" for the group. He said among the officials they met in Iran was its supreme leader Ali Khamenei. He further stated he received permission from Saddam Hussein, before his capture, to seek money and weapons from the Syrian government, he did not state if that request was granted. Stratfor however reported that no evidence has been produced to date that Hussein oversaw strategic decision-making for, or provided money to, any guerrilla force. Furthermore, Jaysh Muhammad al-Fatih in a statement to Basra Network denied that Yassen was ever a commanding general in the group, as was claimed in the media.

== Composition ==
It is rumored that Jaysh Muhammad al-Fatih is the military wing of the Arab Socialist Ba'th Party (ASBP). The group is said to have been founded in 2003 by a group of insurgents in Diyala during a meeting between representatives from the towns of Ramadi, Fallujah, Samarra and Baquba.

Known brigades of Jaysh Muhammad:

- Al-husayn Brigade
- Al-Abbas Brigade
- Islamic Jihad Brigade
- Abdallah Bin-Jahsh Bin-Rikab al-Asadi Brigade
- Walid Bin al-Mughirah Brigade
- Umar al-Faruq Brigade
- Al-Mahdi al-Muntazir

== See also ==
- al-Abud Network
- Iraq War
- Second Battle of Fallujah
- Fedayeen Saddam
