= Robert Bathurst filmography =

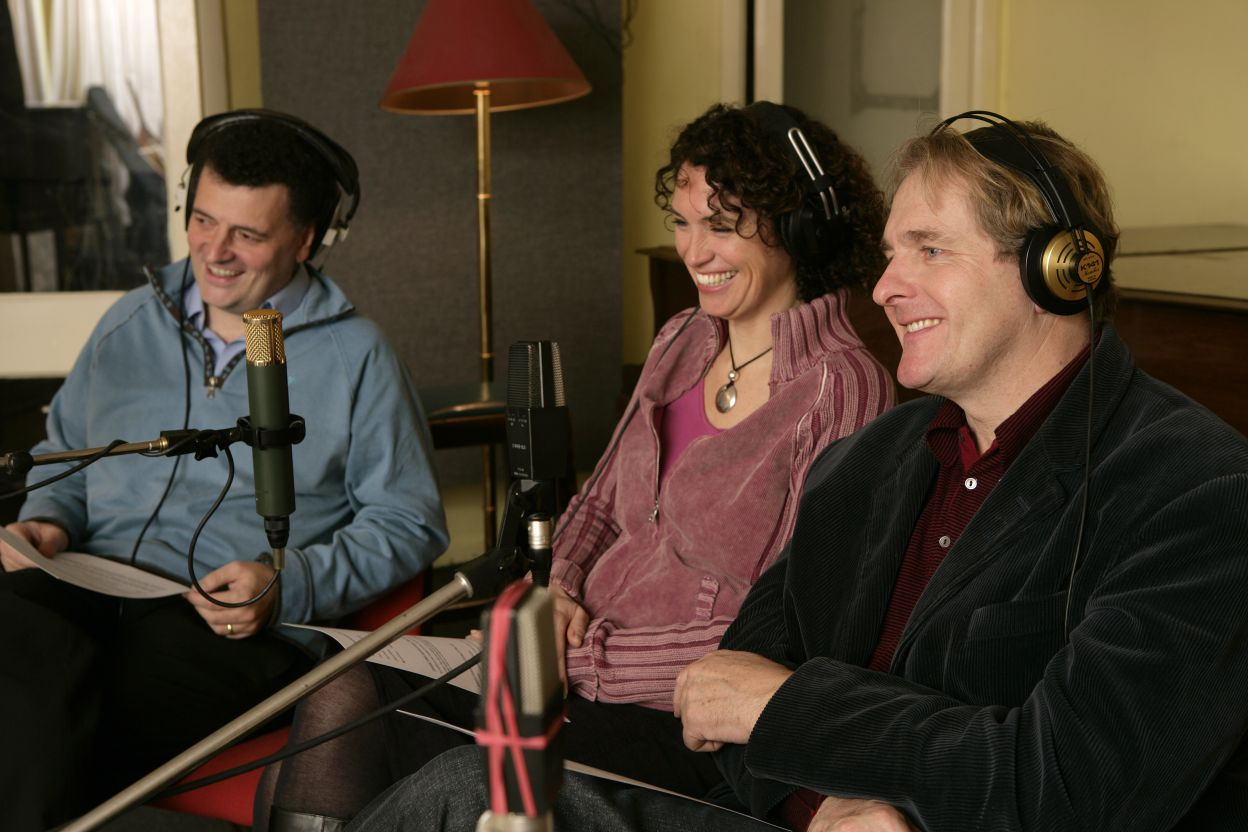
Robert Bathurst (r) recording the DVD audio commentary for Joking Apart with co-star Fiona Gillies (c) and writer Steven Moffat (l). Joking Apart was Bathurst's first major television role, and ran for two series from 1993 to 1995.

The filmography of English actor Robert Bathurst comprises both film and television roles spanning almost 30 years. Bathurst made his acting debut for television in 1982 in the never-broadcast pilot episode for the BBC sitcom Blackadder, though his character Prince Henry was recast when the Black Adder series was commissioned. Throughout the rest of the 1980s, Bathurst appeared in episodes of The Lenny Henry Show, Who Dares Wins, The District Nurse, Red Dwarf, and Chelmsford 123, before starring alongside his Cambridge Footlights colleague Stephen Fry in the short-run series Anything More Would Be Greedy. He also appeared in the films Whoops Apocalypse (1986) and Just Ask for Diamond (1988).

Into the 1990s, Bathurst gained wider recognition from television audiences, first as writer Mark Taylor in Joking Apart from 1991 to 1995, then as David Marsden in Cold Feet from 1997 to 2003 and again from 2016. The decade also saw him appear in the television series The House of Eliott, The Detectives, and Hornblower, and the films Twenty-One (1991) and Terry Jones's The Wind in the Willows (1996).

In the early 2000s, Bathurst starred in a succession of one-off television dramas before taking the role of British prime minister Michael Phillips in the sitcom My Dad's the Prime Minister. Throughout the rest of the decade, he appeared in episodes of New Tricks, Agatha Christie's Poirot, and Kingdom, played Mark Thatcher in the fact-based drama Coup!, had a recurring role in the sitcom My Family, and starred in the costume drama Emma. He starred as John Le Mesurier in the Hattie Jacques television biopic Hattie and returned to a weekly TV series role in Wild at Heart in 2012.

Alongside his television and film roles, Bathurst has developed a theatre career. He appeared in several Cambridge Footlights Revues between 1977 and 1981, and co-directed the 1978 Footlights pantomime with Martin Bergman. (Note: Bathurst's acting credit for this role was "Bob Bathurst".) From his first professional stage role playing Tim Allgood in Michael Frayn's Noises Off (1983), Bathurst has starred in Judgement (1987), Getting Married (1993), The Nose (1995), The Rover (1996), Alarms and Excursions (1998–1999), The Three Sisters (2003), Whipping it Up (2006, 2007), Present Laughter (2010), and Blithe Spirit (2010, 2011).

== Filmography ==
=== Television ===
Television
Year(s)	Title	Role(s)	Description
1982	The Black Adder	Prince Henry	Unaired pilot episode
1984	The Lenny Henry Show	Various	Television series
1986	New World	Cast member	Television film
1986	Who Dares Wins	Various	1 episode
1987	The District Nurse	Christian	1 episode
1988	Red Dwarf	Frank Todhunter	1 episode ("The End")
1988	All in Good Faith	Father Cary	1 episode ("The Spirit Is Willing")
1988	Chelmsford 123	Gaius	1 episode
1989	Mr Christie	Larry Craig	Television film
1989	Anything More Would Be Greedy	Dennis Medlam	6-part television serial
1990	Up Yer News	Various	Live television sketch series
1991	About Face	Dave	1 episode
1991	Lazarus & Dingwall	Justin De Jong	1 episode
1991	Comic Asides: Joking Apart	Mark Taylor	Television pilot
1992	No Job for a Lady	Tony	1 episode
1992	Early Travellers in North America	William Makepeace Thackeray	2 episodes
1992	The House of Eliott	Hector Furneux	1 episode
1993–1995	Joking Apart	Mark Taylor	2 series
1994	The Detectives	Thomas	1 episode
1994	Screen One: A Breed of Heroes	Major Edward Lumley	Television film
1997	Get Well Soon	Squadron Leader Fielding	1 series
1997	Comedy Premieres: Cold Feet	David Marsden	Television pilot
1998	Hornblower	Lt. Eccleston	1 episode ("The Even Chance")
1998–2003, 2016–2020	Cold Feet	David Marsden	9 series
1999	The Nearly Complete and Utter History of Everything	English Ambassador; Sir Francis Drake	Television film
2001	Goodbye, Mr Steadman	Alan Steadman	Television film
2002	The Secret	Alex Faraday	2-part television film
2002	White Teeth	Marcus Malfen	4-part television serial
2002	The Safe House	Dr Adam Daley	Television film
2003–2004	My Dad's the Prime Minister	Prime Minister Michael Phillips	2 series
2004	New Tricks	Martin Lombard	1 episode
2004	The Three Sisters	Vershinin	Televised play
2005	The Stepfather	Christopher Veazey	Television film
2005	The Comic Strip Presents...	Charles	1 episode
2006	Agatha Christie's Poirot: After the Funeral	Gilbert Entwhistle	1 episode
2006	Coup!	Mark Thatcher	Television film
2006–2009	My Family	James Garrett	3 episodes
2007	Kingdom	Philip Collins	1 episode
2009	Emma	Mr Weston	4-part television serial
2009	The Queen	Anthony Eden	1 episode
2010	The Pillars of the Earth	Percy Hamleigh	4 episodes
2010–2011	Downton Abbey	Sir Anthony Strallan	6 episodes
2011	Hattie	John Le Mesurier	Television film
2012	Wild at Heart	Ed Lynch	Television series
2012–2015	Toast of London	Ed Howzer-Black	3 series
2013	Dracula	Lord Thomas Davenport	
2013–2014	Blandings	Sir Gregory Parsloe-Parsloe	5 episodes
2014	Agatha Raisin and the Quiche of Death	Andy Cummings Brown	Television film
2015	Mrs. Brown's Boys	William Hunt	1 episode
2017	Gap Year	Bertie	1 episode
2019	Dad's Army: The Lost Episodes	Sergeant Wilson	3 episodes
2020	Luck on Sunday	Guest	1 episode
2021	Doctor Who	General Farquhar	Episode: "Survivors of the Flux"
2021	The Larkins	Johnny Delamere	
2021	The Mezzotint	Garwood	Television film
2022	Toast of Tinseltown	Ed Howzer-Black	Television series
2025	Casualty	Russell Whitelaw	Television series

=== Film ===
Film
Year	Title	Role	Description
1986	Whoops Apocalypse	Damien	Feature film (debut)
1988	Just Ask For Diamond	Vicar	Feature film
1991	Twenty-One	Mr Metcalfe	Feature film
1993	The Euphoric Scale	Raymond Tanner	Short film
1996	The Wind in the Willows	St John Weasel	Feature film
2005	Heidi	Mr Sessemann	Feature film
2006	The Thief Lord	Dottore Massimo	Feature film (Minor antagonist)
2006	Talk	Afghan Hound Owner	Short film
2006	Scoop	Strombel's Co-worker	Feature film
2007	Life:XP	Dr Eckhart	Short film
2009	A Family Portrait	Robert	Short film
2014	Mrs. Brown's Boys D'Movie	Maydo Archer	Feature film
2015	Absolutely Anything	James Cleverill	Feature film
2015	Narcopolis	Kim Nolan	Feature film
2021	The Fall	Michael Hamilton	Short film
2021	Munich – The Edge of War	Sir Nevile Henderson	Feature film

== Theatre ==
Theatre
Year(s)	Title	Role	Director(s)	Performance history
1977	Tag!	Various	Griff Rhys Jones	Arts Theatre, Cambridge, 7–18 June 1977; Oxford Playhouse, 20–25 June 1977; Robin Hood Theatre, Averham, 4–9 July 1977; St Mary's Street Hall, Edinburgh (Edinburgh Festival), 19 August–10 September 1977 (Note: Also broadcast on BBC2 on 16 December 1977 as The 1977 Cambridge Footlights Revue.)
1978	Stage Fright	Various	Martin Bergman	Arts Theatre, Cambridge, 6–17 June 1978. St Mary's Street Hall, Edinburgh (Edinburgh Festival), 18 August–3 September 1978
1978	Aladdin	Widow Twankey	Robert Bathurst & Martin Bergman	ADC Theatre, Cambridge, 21 November–2 December 1978
1979	Nightcap	Various	Clive Anderson	Arts Theatre, Cambridge, 5–16 June 1979; St Mary's Street Hall, Edinburgh (Edinburgh Festival), 17 August–1 September 1979
1979	Brown Rice with Everything	Various	Charles McFarland	St Mary's Street Hall, Edinburgh (Edinburgh Festival), 21 August–1 September 1979
1981	Botham: The Musical	Various	— (Note: Some information relating to Bathurst's early theatrical career is not held in nationally published works, though may exist in individual theatre company archives or smaller, local publications.)	Tour of Australia: Perth, Adelaide, Melbourne, Canberra, Sydney, Brisbane, Hobart, Launceston, Burnie, Albury-Wodonga
1982	Beyond the Footlights	Various	Jon Plowman	Lyric, Hammersmith, 5–10 April 1982
1983	Noises Off	Tim Allgood	Michael Blakemore	Savoy Theatre, from 3 January 1983 (second cast)
1984	Saint Joan	Sentry	Ronald Eyre	Olivier (National), 16 February–24 July 1984
1984	Mandragola	Cast member	David Gilmore	Olivier (National), from 14 June–20 October 1984
1984	A Little Hotel on the Side	Cast member	Jonathan Lynn	Olivier (National), from 10 August 1984
1986	The Swap	Roger	Mark McCrum	Boulevard, Soho, from 9 September–October 1986
1987	Judgement	Andrei Vukhov	Paul Jepson	Man in the Moon, 18 August–15 September 1987
1987–1988	Ubu	Cast member	Paul Jepson	Latchmere, Battersea, 28 December 1987 – 15 January 1988
1988	Dry Rot	Cast member	Christopher Renshaw	Theatre Royal, Bath for three weeks Lyric Theatre, from 28 September 1988 – 7 January 1989
1990	The Next Best Thing	Steve	Patrick Sandford	Nuffield, Southampton, February–March 1990
1990	The Importance of Being Earnest	Jack	Pip Broughton	Nottingham Playhouse, 3–20 October 1990
1991	Lady Audley's Secret	Cast member	Annie Castledine	Lyric Hammersmith, 21 October–30 November 1991
1992	The Choice	Consultant	Annie Castledine	Salisbury Playhouse (Salberg Studio), 12–28 March 1992
1993	Getting Married	Hotchkis	Frank Hauser	Chichester Festival, 30 April–24 June 1993
1994	A Comedy of Errors	Cast member	Paul Clayton	Nottingham Playhouse, 1 September–1 October 1994
1995	The Nose	Kovalyov	Martin Duncan	Nottingham Playhouse, 25 March–15 April 1995
1996	The Rover	Willmore	Jonathan Church	Salisbury Playhouse, 29 April–25 May 1996
1997	Good Copy	Cast member	Topher Campbell	West Yorkshire Playhouse, 1–5 July 1997
1998–1999	Alarms and Excursions	Various	Michael Blakemore	Yvonne Arnaud Theatre, Guildford, 14–25 July 1998; Gielgud Theatre, 14 September 1998 – 6 March 1999
1999	Hedda Gabler	Tesman	Annie Castledine	Theatre Royal, Plymouth, 18–27 November 1999; Richmond Theatre, 29 November–4 December 1999; Theatre Royal, Brighton, 6–11 December 1999
2003	The Three Sisters	Vershinin	Michael Blakemore	Playhouse Theatre, 30 March–18 May 2003
2005	David Blunkett: The Musical	Boris Johnson	Mary-Jo Paranzino	One night only preview, Soho Theatre, 14 April 2005
2006	Members Only	Adrien	Marianne Badrichani	Trafalgar Studios, 28 March–22 April 2006
2006–2007	Whipping it Up	Alistair	Terry Johnson	West End run, 2006 and 2007; Bush Theatre, 10 November–23 December 2006; Ambassadors Theatre, 1 March–16 June 2007; National tour, 2007; New Victoria Theatre, Woking, 4–8 September 2007; Palace, Southend-on-Sea, 10–15 September 2007; Everyman Theatre, Cheltenham, 17–22 September 2007; Richmond Theatre, 1–6 October 2007; Theatre Royal, Brighton, 8–13 October 2007; Theatre Royal, Bath, 15–20 October 2007; Churchill Theatre, Bromley, 12–17 November 2007
2007–2009	Alex	Alex	Phelim McDermott	West End run, 2007; Arts Theatre, 18 October–8 December 2007; International tour, 2008; National tour, 2008; Devonshire Park Theatre, Eastbourne, 21–25 October 2008; Theatre Royal, Windsor, 27 October–1 November 2008; Yvonne Arnaud Theatre, Guildford, 4–8 November 2008; Derngate Theatre, Northampton, 10–15 November 2008; Mercury Theatre, Colchester, 17–22 November; West End run Leicester Square Theatre, 21 November 2008 – 11 January 2009; Nominated, What's on Stage Award for Best Solo Performance
2010	Present Laughter	Garry Essendine	Belinda Lang	National tour, 2010; Richmond Theatre, 18–21 January 2010; Cambridge Arts Theatre, 8–13 February 2010; Everyman Theatre, Cheltenham, 15–20 February 2010; Theatre Royal, Nottingham, 1–6 March 2010; Theatre Royal, Bath, 29 March–3 April 2010
2010–2011	Blithe Spirit	Charles Condomine	Thea Sharrock	National tour, 2010–2011; Theatre Royal, Bath, 3–13 November 2010; Theatre Royal, Brighton, 16–21 November 2010; Cambridge Arts Theatre, 22–27 November 2010; Milton Keynes Theatre, 14–19 February 2011; Richmond Theatre, 21–26 February 2011; West End run, 2011; Apollo Theatre, 2 March–18 June 2011
2012	Blue/Orange		Christopher Luscombe	National tour, 2012
2014	An Ideal Husband	Sir Robert Chiltern	Rachel Kavanaugh	Chichester Festival, 20 November-13 December 2014
2015	Love, Loss and Chianti	Christopher Reid	Jason Morell	Minerva Theatre in association with Chichester Festival, 27–31 January 2015
2015	Who Cares	Multiple roles	Debbie Hannan, Lucy Morrison and Hamish Pirie	Royal Court Theatre, London, 10 April–16 May 2015
2016–2017	King Charles III	King Charles III	Gary Griffin	Chicago Shakespeare Theater, Chicago, 5 November 2016–15 January 2017
2019	Jeffrey Bernard is Unwell	Jeffrey Bernard	James Hillier	Norman's Coach and Horses, London, 7 May–1 June 2019
2020 & 2022	Love, Loss and Chianti	Christopher Reid	Jason Morell	Riverside Studios, Hammersmith, 25 February–March 2020; Edinburgh Assembly Rooms, 3–23 August 2022
2022–2023	Dolly Parton's Smoky Mountain Christmas Carol	Ebenezer Scrooge	Andrew Hilton	Queen Elizabeth Hall, Southbank Centre, London, 8 December 2022–8 January 2023
2023	Jeffrey Bernard is Unwell	Jeffrey Bernard	James Hillier	Norman's Coach and Horses, London, 29 October–21 November 2023

=== Music video ===
Title	Year	Performer	Album	Ref.
"Uptown Girl"	2001	Westlife	World of Our Own	

== Audiobooks ==
Year	Book Title	Role	Notes
2015	The Nature of the Beast	Narrator	Chief Inspector Gamache Novel, Book 11 by Louise Penny
2016	A Great Reckoning	Narrator	Chief Inspector Gamache Novel, Book 12 by Louise Penny
2017	Glass Houses	Narrator	Chief Inspector Gamache Novel, Book 13 by Louise Penny
2018	Kingdom of the Blind	Narrator	Chief Inspector Gamache Novel, Book 14 by Louise Penny
2019	A Better Man	Narrator	Chief Inspector Gamache Novel, Book 15 by Louise Penny
2020	All the Devils Are Here	Narrator	Chief Inspector Gamache Novel, Book 16 by Louise Penny
2021	The Madness of Crowds	Narrator	Chief Inspector Gamache Novel, Book 17 by Louise Penny
2021	The Hangman	Narrator	Chief Inspector Gamache novella by Louise Penny
2022	A World of Curiosities	Narrator	Chief Inspector Gamache Novel, Book 18 by Louise Penny
