= Peattie =

Peattie is a surname. Notable people with the surname include:

- Charles Peattie (born 1958), British cartoonist
- Donald C. Peattie (1898–1964), American botanist
- Elia W. Peattie (1862–1935), author
- Mark Peattie (1930–2014), American academic
