= Vanstone =

Vanstone is a surname. Notable people with the surname include:

- Amanda Vanstone (born 1952), Australian politician and diplomat
- Hugh Vanstone, English lighting designer
- James W. VanStone (1925–2001), American anthropologist
- Paul Vanstone (born 1967), British sculptor
- Scott Vanstone (1947-2014), Canadian cryptographer
