= Russell Taylor (cartoonist) =

British cartoonist (born 1960)

Russell Philip Taylor
- Born: 8 July 1960 (age 65)

Russell Philip Taylor MBE (born 8 July 1960) is a British writer, journalist and composer. He is best known as half of the team (with Charles Peattie) that created the satirical comic strip Alex.

== Education ==
Taylor studied at Abingdon School from 1973 to 1978. During his time at the school he was on the editorial board of The Abingdonian. He then read Russian and Philosophy at St Anne's College, Oxford.

== Alex ==
Alex was created by Taylor and Charles Peattie and it first appeared in the London Daily News which ran from 24 February to 23 July 1987. The cartoon then appeared in The Independent during 1987 before moving to The Daily Telegraph in 1992.

The cartoon strip was so popular that it was subject to a nationwide billboard campaign before it switched to The Daily Telegraph. Taylor is a supporter of Tottenham Hotspur football club, and as a private joke (and to avoid libel accusations) always names characters who are fired in the Alex strip after Tottenham footballers.

Alex was turned into a stage play by Peattie and Taylor and was performed at the Arts Theatre, London in October, 2007. Robert Bathurst portrayed the titular character.

== Other works ==
He also writes TV and film music with Steve Cooke. Among others, they composed the music for the documentaries The Dying Rooms in 1995 and Saving Africa's Witch Children – both of which won BAFTAs in 1996 and 2009 respectively.

He has also written books on Russia and marathon running and was appointed Member of the British Empire in the 2002 New Year Honours.

== See also ==
- List of Old Abingdonians
