= Endsville =

Endsville may refer to:

- Endsville, an album by Huevos Rancheros
- Endsville, a film by Steven Cantor, and starring Kyle Secor
- Endsville, a poetry collection by Paul Durcan and Brian Lynch
- Endsville, a fictional location in The Moon Is a Harsh Mistress
- Endsville, a fictional town in The Grim Adventures of Billy & Mandy
- Endsville, a sculpture by Roland Brener
