= Mary Fitzpayne =

British artist (born 1928)

- Born: Alice Mary Payne; 23 March 1928 (age 98); Catterick, North Yorkshire, England
- Education: Leeds College of Art; Central School of Art and Design; Royal College of Art
- Known for: Painting

Mary Fitzpayne (born 23 March 1928) is an English artist.

== Early life and education ==
Fitzpayne was born Alice Mary Payne in Catterick, North Yorkshire, and brought up in Leeds. She studied at the Leeds College of Art, the Central School of Art and Design and the Royal College of Art in London from 1949 to 1952. There she studied under the artists Roderigo Moynihan, Carel Weight, John Minton, Francis Bacon and Ruskin Spear and met the painter Eric Doitch, who was to become her husband. They set up home in London, eventually moving to a house in Camberwell that became renowned for its collection of art and for their circle of friends which included writers such as Elias Canetti, Richard Grunberger and Erich Fried.

== Painting and drawing ==
Fitzpayne honed her drawing skills with many hours of life drawing and sketching the people on the streets of Leeds. She later found her subjects among the lives of the street drinkers that populated Camberwell. Fitzpayne's identification with and concern for those on the margins of society led her to begin a series of drawings and paintings in the early 1960s depicting the homeless and street people. These individuals were often living in makeshift communes in central London venues. As a person she had sympathy with their plight and was always at great pains to point out that they were human beings who deserved to be treated with fairness and dignity. Fitzpayne made regular visits to the areas where they slept and to the church of St Martin-in-the-Fields which has always offered shelter.

Fitzpayne's paintings of the circus, inspired by a visit made with her children, began an artistic journey that continues to this day. Clowns, harlequins and circus acrobats people the internal landscape of her work. She moved to rural Lincolnshire in 1971. Her work continues to be drawn from mythological and religious subjects in a vivid figurative manner.

Fitzpayne exhibited works in group shows in Britain, Germany and the Netherlands. She had solo exhibitions at the Usher Gallery in Lincoln during 1983 and 1989, at the Blackfrairs Art Gallery in 1988 and at the Guildhall Museum in Boston in 2000. Both Swindon and Westminster Education Authorities hold examples of her work. Her drawings feature in the British Museum collection.

== Personal life ==
Fitzpayne married the Austrian refugee artist Eric Doitch in 1954 and they had two children. She lives in Lincolnshire.
