= Abud (disambiguation) =

Abud is a village in Palestine.

Abud may also refer to:

Places

- Abud, a village in Ghindari, Mureș County, Romania
- Aboud (disambiguation), Arabic-language placenames variously transliterated Abboud, Aboud, or `Ābūd

Surname

- Chaim Shaul Abud (1890–1977) Syrian–Israeli poet, rabbi, and educator
- Liliana Abud (born 1948), Mexican actress
- Juan José Guerra Abud (born 1952), Mexican entrepreneur and politician
- Manuel Abud, Mexican-American media executive
- Aboud (disambiguation), Arabic-language personal names variously transliterated Abboud, Aboud, or `Ābūd
