= School of Art, Architecture and Design =

School of art in London, England

Coordinates: 51.5153103°N 0.0739167°W

The School of Art, Architecture and Design, London Metropolitan University
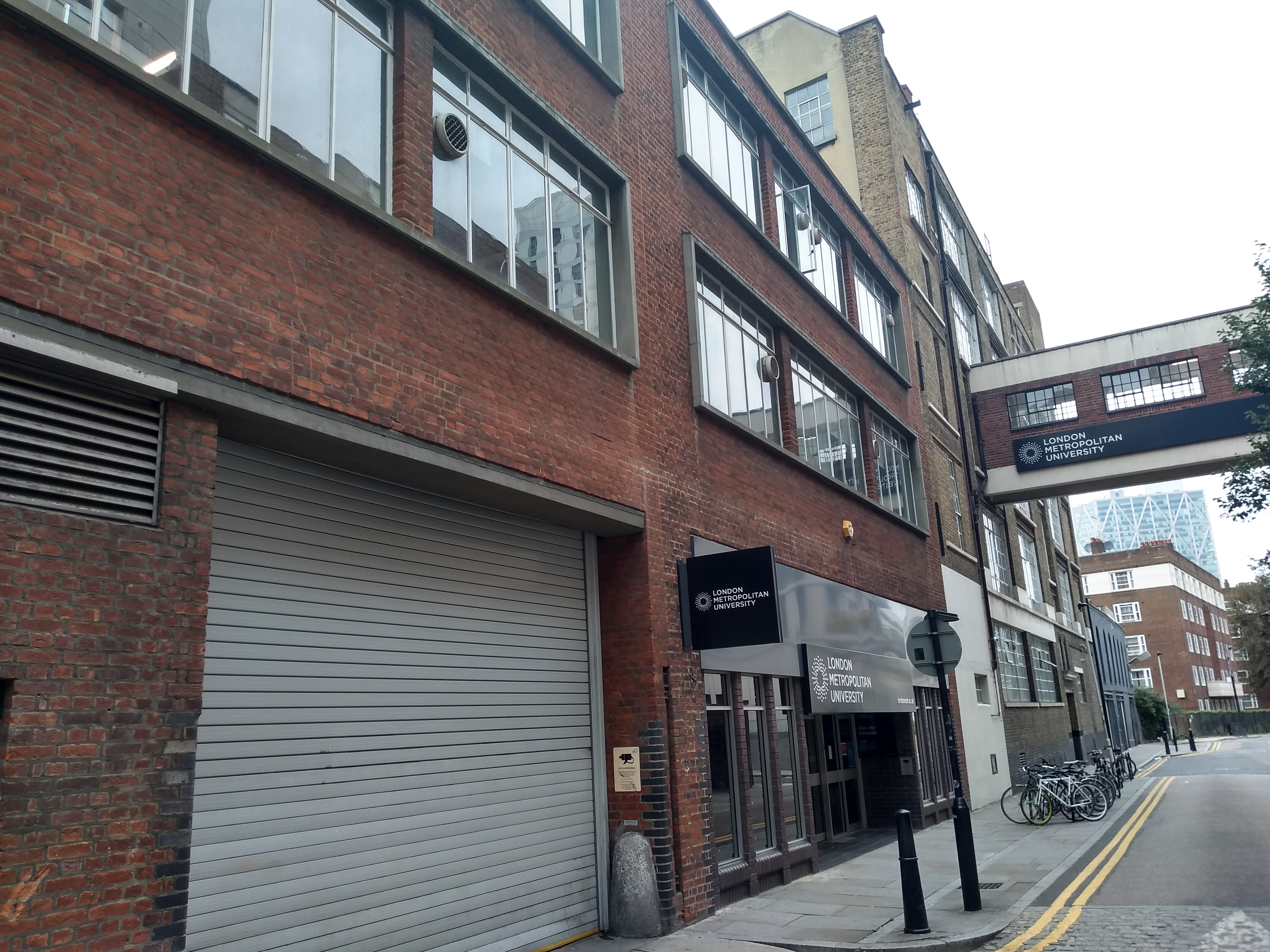

Location
- Old Castle Street; London, E1 7NT; England

Information
- Other name: The Cass
- Former names: Sir John Cass Technical Institute (1899–1949); Sir John Cass College (1950–1964); Sir John Cass School of Art (1965–2001); Sir John Cass Faculty of Art, Media and Design (2002–2020)

The School of Art, Architecture and Design is an art school in Aldgate in London, England, that is part of London Metropolitan University. It was established in its present form in 2012 from the merger of the Sir John Cass Faculty of Art, Media and Design and the faculty of Architecture and Spatial Design of the London Metropolitan University. John Cass' name was removed from the institutional name in 2020 because of his associations with the slave trade. The school is presently based at the University's refurbished Aldgate Campus which comprises three buildings, Goulston Street, Calcutta House and the Calcutta Small Annexe in Aldgate, London. Courses are provided at all levels including short courses, foundation year, undergraduate and postgraduate programmes. It previously nicknamed 'The Cass', and also went by the Sir John Cass School of Art (1965–2001), the Sir John Cass College (1950–1964), and the Sir John Cass Technical Institute (1899–1949).

== History ==
It has a history stretching back to 1899, when it was founded as the Sir John Cass Technical Institute. The school took its former name from philanthropist Sir John Cass (1661–1718), who helped establish funding for education in Aldgate and whose statue is displayed in the University.

In 1965, the Sir John Cass School of Art was formed by a merge between the School's department of fine and applied art with the department of silversmithing and allied crafts from the Central School of Arts and Crafts. The Sir John Cass School of Art merged with the City of London College in 1970 to form the City of London Polytechnic ( see London Guildhall University). In 2002, the school merged with London Metropolitan University to form the Sir John Cass Faculty of Art, Media and Design at London Metropolitan University.

In March 2019 London Metropolitan University formally announced that The Cass would remain in Aldgate. The decision, which was made following a series of discussions with students, staff, industry professionals and the local council, was formally ratified by the University's Board of Governors and announced to the School by the University's Vice-Chancellor Professor Lynn Dobbs.

=== Sale of Central House in 2015 ===
Controversy erupted in late 2015 after London Metropolitan University unveiled plans to cut many of the Cass's signature programmes while moving the Cass from its traditional Aldgate location (which would be sold) to its Holloway campus; this plan attracted opposition from many of Britain's most renowned artists and designers. Senior members of the faculty, such as dean Robert Mull, resigned in protest over the decision and other initiatives, amid protests by students and staff. Despite the opposition, the sale went through in February the next year, though the building continued to be leased out to the university.

=== Name change in 2020 ===
On 10 June 2020, the University announced that it would be dropping "Sir John Cass" from the school's institutional name with immediate effect. The school is now known as The School of Art, Architecture and Design, pending a further official name change. The decision was made in the wake of the George Floyd protests, and calls by the Black Lives Matter movement for the removal and revision of monuments and names commemorating historical figures connected with the slave trade. The Vice-Chancellor "apologize[d] that we haven't taken this step before now".

== About ==
A studio or unit is a study group with a particular theme or focus taken by year two and three undergraduate art, architecture and design students and by postgraduate architecture students at The Cass as part of their studies. Studios are led by both academic staff and professional practitioners, sometimes linking to external organisations or project briefs. At the start of each academic year, the leaders of each studio present their studio's themes, position and approach to allow students to choose from a wide range of issues, methods of working and types of project. During the year the studios come together for major events such as Celebration Week – when students present work in progress to panels of external critics – and summer exhibitions.

== Notable alumni ==
- Jon Klein (musician) (born 1960), guitarist for Siouxsie and the Banshees, and time-based media artist
- Alicia Melamed Adams (1927–2022), painter, Holocaust survivor
- Sandi Fellman (born 1952), American photographer
