= Heather Amery =

English author

Heather Amery is an English author and editor of children's books. Amery's body of work has been published for 50 years, from the 1970s, and has continued to be re-published and expanded into the 2020s.

She is the author of more than three hundred books for children. These included her work in conjunction with well-known children's illustrator Stephen Cartwright, such as in the series of 20 Farmyard Tales books and the Usborne First Thousand Words... series (both series were illustrated by Cartwright). Amery's other works included the My First Reading Library series, and a range of other books that encourage early learners in reading, science, history, English, and languages other than English, as well as collections of classic fairy tales, songs and poetry, Greek myths, Bible stories and craft books.

She has been awarded the English Association Award for Non-Fiction (which is replaced since 2017 by the Margaret Mallet Award for Children's Non-Fiction).

Amery was born and raised in Bath, Somerset, England.

== Reviews ==
In 2002, The Classical Outlook described Greek Myths for Young Children as "retold by...Amery in a way that young children can listen to and understand and older children can read for themselves", while in 2007, it described Greek Myths Jigsaw Book as "six of the best-known and best-loved stories ... chosen for this beautifully illustrated jigsaw puzzle book."

Re The Time Traveller Book of Rome and Romans, Margaret LeFevre in 1978 stated that "Every page is full of accurate details presented in amusing drawings, ... most useful ...[and] well thought out."

Re The Age of Sailing Ships, David Killingray believed it would be "difficult to think of children not enjoying the attractive and imaginatively presented account of European sailing vessels... [under] twenty-four topics... [that] delight the enthusiast and excite the curious."

== Notable works ==
=== Farmyard Tales ===
- The Usborne Book of Farmyard Tales.
- The Usborne Book of More Farmyard Tales (1990).
- Even More Farmyard Tales (1993).
- The Usborne Book of Lots More Farmyard Tales (1995).
- Poppy and Sam's First Words Flash-cards (2002).
- Farmyard Tales Treasury (2006).
- Farmyard Tales Christmas Flap Book (2010).
- Poppy and Sam's Sticker Book (2011).
- Poppy and Sam Complete Book of Farmyard Tales (2013; reissue 2023; 2025).
- The Complete Book of Farmyard Tales (2013); contains 20 Farmyard Tales stories.
- Poppy and Sam's First Word Book (2019).
- Poppy and Sam's Telling the Time Book (2021).
- Poppy and Sam's Lift-the-Flap Christmas (2025)

=== Other works ===
- Amery, Heather; Littler, Angela (1975). The Knowhow Book of Batteries and Magnets. Educational Development Corporation. ISBN 978-0-86020-008-6.
- Amery, Heather; Civardi, Anne; Corless, Jim (1976). The Funcraft Book of Print and Paint. Scholastic Book Services. ISBN 978-0-590-11935-1.
- Amery, Heather; Vanags, Patricia (1976). The Time Traveller Book of Rome and Romans.
- Nash, G. P. B.; Amery, Heather (1976). The Age of Sailing Ships.
- The Usborne Children's Songbook. illustrated by Stephen Cartwright. Usborne Publishing. 1998.
- The Usborne Children's Bible, 1998, illustrated by Linda Edwards.
- Then and Now, 2008, illustrated by Peter Firmin.
- Dealbh is Facal ('Picture and Word', in Scots Gaelic), 2010, illustrations by Stephen Cartwright.
- Usborne Easter Story, 2011, illustrated by Norman Young.
- Usborne Greek Myths, 2012, illustrated by Linda Edwards.
- Christmas Around the World, 2014, illustrated by Angela Ruta.
- Y Tri Mochin Bach (The Three Little Pigs, in Welsh), 2019.

=== Language learning (illustrations by Stephen Cartwright) ===
- NOTE: Some editions are available to read online, through the Community Library Network, and have internet-linked pronunciation guides.
- The First Thousand Words in English, French, Spanish, German, Italian, Russian, Hebrew.
- The Usborne First Thousand Words in Maori, 2006.
- The Usborne First Thousand Words in English, 2013.
- The Usborne First Thousand Words in English Sticker Book, 2014.
- The Usborne First Thousand Words in French, 2013.
- The Usborne First Thousand Words in French, Sticker Book, 2014.
- The Usborne First Thousand Words in Italian, 2013.
- The Usborne First Thousand Words in Arabic, 2014.
- The Usborne First Thousand Words in Spanish, 2015
- The Usborne First Thousand Words in Polish, 2013.
- The Usborne First Thousand Words in German, 2014.
- The Usborne First Thousand Words in Portuguese, 2015.
- The Usborne First Thousand Words in Japanese, 2014.
- The Usborne First Thousand Words in Latin, 2014.
- The Usborne First Thousand Words in Chinese, 2014.
