= Joe Allen (painter) =

British artist

Joe Allen (born 1955) is a British artist. He is known for a series of large-sized paintings on wood and for small portraits of artists.

== Life and work ==
Allen was born in Airdrie, Scotland. When attending school he took private lessons from C. M. Cameron, a Scottish painter of landscapes and also attended art classes at the Glasgow School of Art. He started his vocational education at St Martins School of Art in London and gained his degree as Bachelor of Arts with Honours in Fine Art at the Camberwell School of Art. Subsequently he gained the Master of Art Degree at the Royal Academy School in London.

In 1983 he started lecturing at Art Colleges in Newcastle and London, later he taught at the Centro de Arte Verrochio near Siena. From 1984 to 2007 he was a lecturer at the European Art Academy in Trier. He lives in London und Trier (Germany).

References to works from various periods in the history of art are to found in his paintings. They evoke reminiscences of Piero della Francesca, Velázquez, Titian or John Constable. Also an influence by impressionist painters such as Édouard Manet, Claude Monet or Pissarro and masters van Gogh and Cézanne can be detected. Although he spent most of his adult life outside Scotland Allen can also be seen as standing in the tradition of the Glasgow Boys.

In 2007 Allen started a series of more than thirty small portraits of famous painters (and persons related to painters) among them Rembrandt, Delacroix, Toulouse-Lautrec, Picasso, Mark Rothko and David Hockney. Allen describes the process of painting by claiming that these portraits were not planned. "They came as a gift as it were. I put down two or three tones and there he was ‘Manet’; I just had to bring him out of the shadows a little more. Interested, exited, I took a fresh canvas and began in the same way, Mary Cassatt showed herself, and as I repeated the process Soutine arrived." (A special selection, 2007, foreword).

== Exhibitions ==
- 1986 Galerie Ariadne, Wien
- 1988 Galerie Ariadne, Wien
- 1989 Galerie Elisabeth und Klaus Thoman, Innsbruck
- 1990 Galerie Ariadne, Wien; Galerie 86, Trier
- 1991 Galerie Claire Fontaine, Luxemburg
- 1992 Galerie Ariadne, Wien
- 1995 Cynthia Bourne Gallery, London
- 1997 Galerie Claire Fontaine, Luxemburg
- 2000 Galerie Claire Fontaine, Luxemburg; Künstlerhaus Metternich, Koblenz; Galerie Bernd Weise, Chemnitz; Galerie Ariadne, Wien
- 2001 Galerie Weise, Chemnitz
- 2002 Galerie Rothamel, Erfurt
- 2003 Biennale Sharjah - Special Show; 2003 Galerie Claire Fontaine, Luxemburg; Galerie Netusil, Wien
- 2006 Schloss Moyland, Bedburg-Hau;
- 2007 Galerie Claire Fontaine, Luxemburg
- 2008 Schloss Detmold, Ausstellung des Kunstvereins Detmold
- 2009 Galerie Claire Fontaine, Luxemburg
- 2009/2010 Kunsthalle Darmstadt: Gesichtslos. Die Malerei des Diffusen.

== Literature ==
- Joe Allen. Spuren und Fährten. Malerei 1996 - 2006. Ed. by Stiftung Museum Schloss Moyland, Sammlung van der Grinten, Joseph Beuys Archiv des Landes Nordrhein-Westfalen. Bedburg-Hau 2006.
- Allen, Joe: A special selection. Luxemburg (Galerie Clairefontaine) 2007.
- Kunsthalle Darmstadt: Gesichtslos. Die Malerei des Diffusen. Eugène Carrière, John Beard (artist), Jörg Madlener, Joe Allen, Rainer Lind. Catalogue of the exhibition "Gesichtslos", September 2009 - January 2010.
