= Eric Doitch =

- Born: 17 May 1923
- Died: 7 June 2000 (aged 77)

Eric Doitch (17 May 1923 – 7 June 2000) was a British artist. Born in Vienna, Austria, he was expelled by the Nazis, with him subsequently settling in the United Kingdom, where he studied art and later operated as a professional artist.

== Early life ==
Doitch was born Siegfried Steiner in Vienna by a liaison between his father Edmund Deutsch and the young Golda Steiner. Adopted into his father's family, he used the name Siegfried Deutsch after his expulsion from Vienna by the Nazis, eventually changing his name to Erich Deutsch and then to the name he used for the rest of his professional life – Eric Doitch.

As an artist he formed part of the London-based Jewish group of creative individuals that dominated cultural life in post-war Britain. He was friends with fellow refugees such as the artist Ernst Eisenmayer, the writer Elias Canetti, the writer Richard Grunberger, the poet Erich Fried, the poet Hans Schmeier and the composer and playwright Peter Ury amongst many others.

After being forcibly expelled from his school in Vienna by the Nazis he narrowly escaped arrest and imprisonment, eventually making his way to London where he settled with his parents in Maida Vale, a haven for refugees like himself. He was also briefly a member of the Young Austria organization based in Westbourne Terrace, London. His sister was forced to spend the war years in Egypt and many other members of the family perished in the death camps.

== Education and career ==
After spending some time at Saint Martin's School of Art he was forced into internment in the Isle of Man and then spent the rest of the war years as a lathe turner in a munitions factory. He eventually became a student at Camberwell School of Art where he was taught by Victor Passmore, Claude Rogers, William Coldstream and Sir Lawrence Gowing. He also studied printmaking with Merlyn Evans. In 1951, he won a scholarship to the Royal College of Art, and upon graduation in 1954 he married his fellow student, the artist Alice Mary Fitzpayne.

During his professional life as an artist and teacher, his work reflected and explored his early experiences, often picturing shocking scenes he had witnessed, or a single lonely figure in a landscape. He avoided crowds, being fearful of the power of large gatherings explored by his good friend Elias Canetti in his seminal work, 'Crowds and Power'. His Jewishnesss was also a private experience, avoiding the Jewish community or the visible expression of religion, borrowing his son's Scout beret rather than wearing a traditional 'kippa' on his rare visits to synagogue. Doitch lived a good deal of his early adult life in Kilburn and Camberwell, where he used the experience of living among the decayed post-war atmospheres of these inner London suburbs to shrewdly observe the urban landscape before him. He documented the dereliction and eventual destruction that these areas later experienced at the hands of the developers. His later years were spent in New Bolingbroke, a small village in rural Lincolnshire where he explored and created a body of work reflecting the local landscape and the life of the local pigs.

Doitch possessed skills and an understanding of art that was considered at odds with the contemporary fashion for abstraction, and his uncompromising attitude towards his work and his wariness of the gallery circuit means that he remains to some extent unrecognized for his artistic gifts and the intensity of his work.

== Personal life ==
Doitch married the artist Mary Fitzpayne in 1954. He had two children, his daughter the artist Käthe Deutsch and his son George.

He died in Boston, Lincolnshire.
