= Dick Aboud =

Canadian gridiron football player (born 1941–2000)

Profile
- Positions: Linebacker, OG

Personal information
- Born: July 24, 1941; Montreal, Quebec
- Died: February 15, 2000 (aged 58)
- Listed height: 6 ft 0 in (1.83 m)
- Listed weight: 208 lb (94 kg)

Career information
- Junior: Mount Royal Lions
- College: Tulsa

Career history
- 1963: Montreal Alouettes
- 1966–1967: Toronto Argonauts

Dick Aboud (July 24, 1941 – February 15, 2000), born Richard Aboud, was a Canadian professional football linebacker and offensive lineman for the Montreal Alouettes and Toronto Argonauts.
