= Alicia Melamed Adams =

Polish painter and Holocaust survivor (1927–2022)

- Born: Alicja Bianka Goldschlag; 26 September 1927; Borysław, Galicia, Second Polish Republic
- Died: 22 October 2022 (aged 95); London, UK
- Other names: Alicia Bianca Melamed Adams; Alicia Melamed; Alicja Mełamed
- Education: Saint Martin's School of Art, 1963; Sir John Cass School of Art
- Organisation: United Society of Artists
- Spouse: Adam Nathan Adams (m. 1946; died 2020)
- Children: 1
- Website: www.aliciamelamed.com

Alicia Melamed Adams (née Alicja Goldschlag; 1927–2022) was a Polish painter and Holocaust survivor based in London.

== Early life ==
Alicja Bianka Goldschlag (Note: Anglicised as Alicia Bianca Goldschlag) was born on 26 September 1927 in Borysław, Second Polish Republic (present-day, Ukraine) to a Polish Jewish family. Adams' father, Izydor Goldschlag (1885–1943), was petroleum engineer for the Vacuum Oil Company and her mother, Szarlotte Goldschlag (née Teicher; 1897–1943) was a designer. Adams had one older brother, Józef (1923–1942).

In the early 1930s Adams' father lost his job as a result of the Great Depression. The Goldschlag family moved to live with her mother's family in Drohobycz (present-day Drohobych, Ukraine), whilst her father moved to Gdynia and started a fruit import business. Adams first experienced antisemitism whilst living in Drohobycz. Two years later the family relocated to Gdynia and in 1937 Adams' father started a business in selling oil mining machinery. Following the outbreak of Second World War, Adams' father sent the family to Drohobych to live with her maternal grandparents. Adams' father later returned to Drohobycz and worked at a local oil refinery.

Adams was educated at the Polish gymnasium and studied drawing under Bruno Schulz, a family friend. Following the annexation of Drohobycz into Ukrainian SSR, Adams joined the Young Pioneers.

== Holocaust ==
=== Occupation of Drohobycz ===
Following the occupation of Drohobycz in 1941, the Goldschlag family hid during the ensuing three day pogrom. The family were forced into the Drohobycz Ghetto and Adams was forced to work carrying bricks on a building site by the Gestapo. Whilst working at the building site Adams met Poldek Weiss whose father was a tailor for the Gestapo. Adams was later forced to work as a cleaner for a Gestapo officer.

In 1942, Adams' brother Józef died at Janowska concentration camp. Adams and her family later lived and worked in a small recycling factory outside of the ghetto run by Viktor Kremin.

=== Beskiden Labour Camp ===
On 24 July 1943, the family was transported to a local prison. On 25 July 1943, Adams was released and transported to Beskiden Labour Camp by posing as the wife of Poldek Weiss, a forced labour at the Beskiden oil factory camp. Adams' father and mother were shot on the 26 July 1943.

Adams and Weiss were later transported to the Gestapo camp were Weiss's father worked, and managed to hide during the liquidation of the camp. Adams and Weiss managed to escape and hid with a Ukrainian family.

Following the liberation by Soviet Army, Adams lived with her uncle and the Weiss family in Drohobycz. Adams later moved with the Weiss family to Wałbrzych. Not wanting to marry Weiss and immigrate to Canada with the Weiss family, Adams moved to a nearby town to live with her uncle.

== London ==
In 1947, Adams and her husband temporarily moved Paris to prepare to immigrate to Israel, and for Adam Nathan Adams learnt to manufacture ties. However, Adams became severely ill. In 1950, Adams and her husband relocated to London.

From 1960 to 1963, Adams studied at Saint Martin's School of Art where she befriended Fernando Montes and Lady Rachel Clay. In 1963, Adams produced a series of paintings depicting her early life and the loss of her family and friends, which remained hidden in her studio until the 1980s. Adams later attended Sir John Cass School of Art.

In 1965, Adams joined the United Society of Artists.

== Personal life ==
In 1946, Adams met Izrael Natan Melamed (later Adam Nathan Adams; 1923–2020), a fellow Holocaust survivor. The couple married three months later in Warsaw by Rabbi Dawid Kahane. The couple had one son, born in 1951.

Adams died on 22 October 2022 in London, aged 95.
