= Fernando Montes =

Bolivian painter (1930–2007)

- Born: Fernando Montes Peñaranda; 14 August 1930; La Paz, Bolivia
- Died: 17 January 2007 (aged 76); London, UK
- Education: Higher University of San Andrés; Royal Academy of Fine Arts of San Fernando, 1959; Saint Martin's School of Art, 1960; Central School of Arts and Crafts, 1961
- Spouse: Marcela Villegas Sánchez Bustamante (m. 1960)
- Children: 2
- Website: fernandomontes.co.uk

Fernando Montes Peñaranda (14 August 1930 – 17 January 2007) was a Bolivian artist, painter and filmmaker who was based in London.

== Early life ==
Montes was born on 14 August 1930 in La Paz to Hugo Montes (died 1938), a lawyer and politician, and Eloísa Peñaranda Minchin. Montes' father was later the leader of the Liberal Party.

In 1942, aged 12, Montes and his family moved to Buenos Aires, Argentina to live with his maternal grandmother. Montes attended the Escuela Argentina Modelo, and in 1945 he began an apprenticeship with Vicente Puig. Upon finishing school Montes returned to La Paz and studied philosophy at the Higher University of San Andrés.

== Career ==
=== Bolivia ===
From 1951 to 1953 Montes worked with the filmmakers Augusto Roca and Jorge Ruiz Calvimonte, a childhood friend. Together they travelled through remote parts of the high plains and the Amazonian lowlands of Bolivia. In 1951, Montes recorded the sound for Los Urus, the first ethnographic documentary made in Latin America.

From 1953 onwards Montes painted professionally in Las Paz, where he first exhibited a series of portraits in 1956. He subsequently journeyed from La Paz, in the heart of the Andes mountains, down into Bolivia's Amazonian forest. On this expedition, Montes drew sketches of the Mosetén people, from which he painted several works the following year. In 1959, Montes represented Bolivia at the 5th São Paulo Art Biennial. The same year Montes was awarded a scholarship by the Spanish government to study for a year at the Royal Academy of Fine Arts of San Fernando in Madrid.

=== London ===
In June 1960, Montes was invited to view the collection of Latin American Art at the British Museum in London. Initially intending to stay in London for two weeks, Montes reencountered his future spouse Marcela Villegas Sánchez Bustamante. They were married in London in December 1960.

Deciding to stay in London, Montes enrolled at the Saint Martin's School of Art where he befriended Alicia Melamed Adams, From 1960 to 1961, Montes studied at the Central School of Arts and Crafts. In 1965, Montes had his first solo exhibition in London where he exhibited a series of 'pub paintings'. That same year Montes visited Bolivia with his wife and three-year-old son, triggering a return to Bolivian subject matter.

During this and later visits to Bolivia, Montes travelled across the Andean Plateau, where he created a number of drawings. These later became the basis for a series of paintings on the landscape of the Altiplano and its people, exploring the relationship between the human being and the land.

=== International recognition ===
In 1973, Montes was invited to participate in the "Bolivian Contemporary Painters" exhibition at the Musée d'Art Moderne de Paris.

In 1977, Montes was awarded the first prize in painting at the 2nd INBO (Note: Inversiones Bolivianas.) Biennial.

In 1999, Montes represented Bolivia at the 48th Venice Biennale. The same year a retrospective exhibition of Montes' work was held at the National Museum of Art in La Paz.

== Legacy ==
A painting by Montes was kept in the office of Evo Morales during his Presidency.

In 2007, the Fernando Montes Art Fund was created in his memory by his widow, Marcela, and his son and daughter, with the help of generous donations from friends. It was established to respond to Montes’ concern about the difficulties that young artists face in Bolivia and his wish for a greater emphasis to be placed on the teaching of drawing in the development of artists. The same year the Fund paid for the refurbishment of the gallery at the Fine Arts Academy (Academia Nacional de Bellas Artes “Hernando Siles”) in La Paz, Bolivia.

In 2008, the artist's widow, son and daughter set up a national prize in drawing, backed by the Fund and bearing Montes' name: (Premio El Valor del Dibujo, Fernando Montes Peñaranda). Held annually, it is open to young Bolivian artists (age 35 and under). The competition has become a major event in the country's cultural life.

In 2019, the Museo Fernando Montes was opened in La Paz by the Fundación Cultural del Banco Central de Bolivia.

== Personal life ==
In 1960, Montes married Marcela Villegas Sánchez Bustamante, (Note: Also known as Marcela Montes and Marcela de Montes.) a Bolivian private secretary to the Colombian ambassador in London. Montes and Villegas had two children.

On 17 January 2007 Montes died from cancer in London aged 76.

== Publications ==
- Montes, Fernando (1999). PINTORES BOLIVIANOS CONTEMPORANEOS Fernando Montes: Obra 1967 - 1999. La Paz: Santillana de Ediciones S.A. ISBN 978-99905-2-090-3
- Montes Peñaranda, Fernando (2023). Detrás de los Andes: diario de viaje de un artista [Behind the Andes: an artist's travel diary] (in English and Spanish). La Paz: Plural Editores. ISBN 9789917625414.
