= Anne Magill =

British artist

Anne Magill (born in Millisle, Northern Ireland) is a painter who now lives and works in Brighton, England.

== Biography ==
Born in Northern Ireland, Magill studied a foundation course at Liverpool Polytechnic before moving to London to study at St. Martins School of Art between 1981 and 1984. She subsequently became an illustrator, working for magazine and publishing houses, design and ad agencies. Her newspaper clients included The Sunday Times, The Observer and Today. Magill worked as a courtroom artist for both the BBC and for ITN. Her commercial clients have included British Airways, Marks & Spencer, Nike, Levi Strauss, Heineken, Canary Wharf, Saatchi & Saatchi and The Body Shop. She is a past winner of the Benson & Hedges Illustration Awards. Her first solo exhibition was in 1992 and since then she has regularly exhibited in London galleries as well as showing in Europe, the United States and Ireland.

== Philanthropy ==
In March 2010 Magill donated a painting, "Still", to the THT Media release in aid of the Terence Higgins Trust. The painting is one of a series of studies of performers preparing to go on stage which was featured in Magill's exhibition, Journeys.

In October 2010, Magill participated in the British Airways "Save the Postcard" campaign.

In April 2011, Magill contributed a piece of work to the Harestyling exhibition to raise funds for Great Ormond Street Hospital. Her piece was later auctioned at a celebrity ball for over £2000.

In December 2011, Magill donated the painting "Just Before Midnight" to the Cinderella Ball Auction to raise funds for the Muir Maxwell Trust.
