= Maroun Abboud =

Lebanese poet (1886–1962)

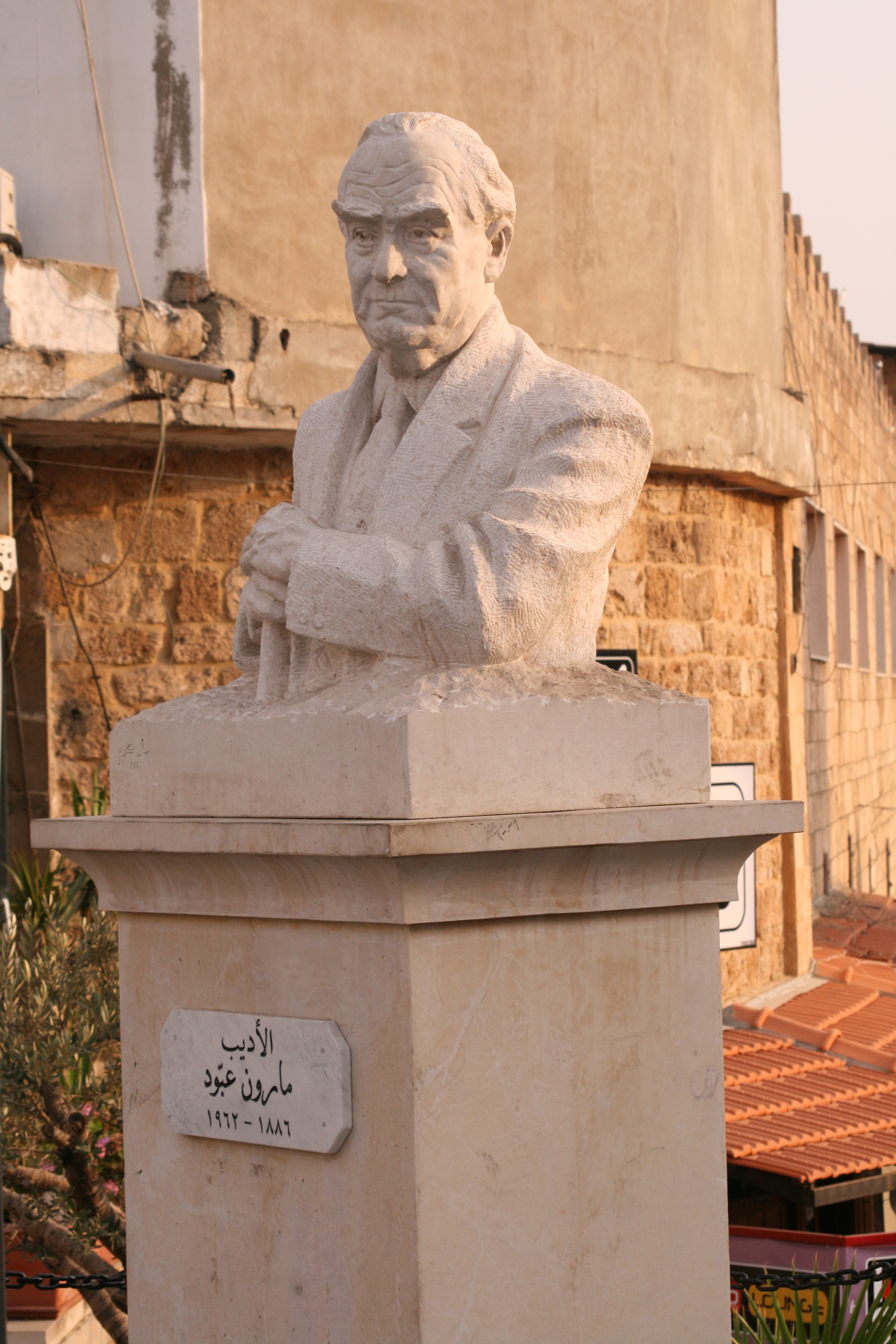

Maroun Abboud (Arabic: مارون عبود; 9 February 1886 – 3 June 1962) was a Lebanese poet and writer known for his simple everyday writing style.

== Life ==
Maroun Abboud was born in a village in Mount Lebanon named Ain Kfah. He studied Arabic, Syriac and French at several schools in Lebanon. Abboud entered the School of St. John Maron Batroun in 1900 to pursue a calling to priesthood. During his four years at St. Maron, he published numerous poems in Al-Rawda newspaper. He then entered the School of Wisdom, where he spent two years. Abboud found the atmosphere one conducive to developing literary talents, including those of Rashid Taqi Al-Din and Ahmed Taqi Al-Din and Said Akl, among others.

Maroun continued his career as a newspaper editor in addition to writing poetry. He died 3 June 1962.

== His writings ==
Maroun Abboud wrote about village life in Mount Lebanon and depicted his villagers as simplistic while still honoring their authenticity. His work uses humor to accurately depict the ways of these villagers. Translators of his work sometimes find it difficult to accurately show his fondness towards these people, and at times these translations come off as patronizing.
