= Alex (comic strip) =

British cartoon strip

- Alex, Clive and their wives in a strip from 2010, dwelling on the World Cup
- Author(s): Charles Peattie and Russell Taylor
- Current status/schedule: Ended in newspaper, 4 April 2025
- Launch date: 1987
- Publisher(s): London Daily News (1987), The Independent (1987-1992), The Daily Telegraph (1992-2025)
- Genre(s): Satirical, Gag-a-day

Alex was a British cartoon strip by Charles Peattie and Russell Taylor. It first appeared in the short-lived London Daily News in 1987. It moved to The Independent later that year and then to The Daily Telegraph in 1992. A translated version was published in the German newspaper Financial Times Deutschland. It was also published translated into Dutch for some years in the main financial newspaper of the Netherlands, Het Financieele Dagblad (FD), around the turn of the century.

The strip with its storylines-with-a-twist proved so popular that, in the course of its transfer to the Telegraph, it was preceded by a nationwide billboard campaign.

The strip occurred in 'real-time', i.e. time passes and characters age and develop as in real life. Alex and Penny married in the strip's early days and had a son called Christopher, who grew up, went to school, had work experience and has now started college. Alex and Penny themselves are now middle-aged.

The Daily Telegraph stopped publishing Alex in April 2025.

== Style and humour ==
The "dual panel" style, where slight variations on an otherwise near-identical wordings convey completely different meanings or comment or contrast two different viewpoints. In this example (click to read) the left panel comments on topical political and economic issues, while the right panel with almost identical wording comments on education. The panels pun on the names of then-topical UK political and economics figures Chris Patten (a former Minister for Education), Chancellor Norman Lamont, and well-known economist John Maynard Keynes, and comments on the twin issues of grade inflation within UK education and the European Exchange Rate Mechanism within economics, and the call for a "return to basics" in both, both issues being topical at the time. (Example from "Alex calls the shots" (1993))

The humour in the strip derives from wordplay and twist endings related to Alex's world of yuppie values, Conservative politics, obsession with appearances, displays of wealth and schemes to stay one up in the world of international finance. A common theme is to contrast the old days of the traditional City of London (alcohol-fueled lunches, insider dealing, corporate jollies) with the modern American-influenced financial world (abstemiousness, compliance, corporate-speak).

Peattie and Taylor are reputed to work closely with a variety of London financial contacts to ensure that their strips accurately reflect the recent scandals and rumours which pass around the City. Much gossip has circulated as to the likely inspiration for some of the characters. A storyline in March 2009 had one of Alex's old colleagues leave the city to become a teacher, coinciding with a British government plan to ease the amount of time spent on teacher training and encouraging "fantastic mathematicians... who would have once perhaps gone into the City but now actually might be more interested in a career in teaching".

The most common kind of joke features a conversation between the characters, where in the final frame a twist ending becomes apparent – the context of the conversation was not what the reader had supposed, usually reflecting on the protagonists' materialistic values and priorities.

For instance, in a restaurant, an embarrassed Alex apologises to the maître d' after his dinner guest answers a call on his mobile, which has been frowned upon in the past. The maître d's claim that the restaurant's policy on phones is very relaxed these days does not alleviate Alex's embarrassment since his concern was due to being seen with a companion who was not using the latest model, and not (as the reader may have supposed) due to talking on a cellphone in a restaurant.

Another kind of strip which appears occasionally consists of only two large frames, showing two different characters, or the same character in two different situations, giving a monologue composed of almost exactly the same words, but which, in the different situations, have very different meanings.

During Christmas times, the strip usually takes on storylines featuring fantasy characters and situations, such as 'A Close Encounter' with aliens (1990), visits to Santa Claus (2006, 2009) or a trip to Narnia (2005). In 2013, a 15-part storyline was published, featuring Alex taking over his boss Cyrus's job after the latter committed suicide. However a supernatural agreement saw reversal to "normal" circumstances.

The complexities of the jokes has meant that the strip has often had to take time off (i.e., not appear for two or more weeks) while the writers come up with new material.

== List of characters ==
Alex Masterley (born 24 February 1960) is the protagonist of the comic strip. He is an experienced investment banker working in London's Docklands. Alex is totally obsessed with personal status, with his work coming second and his family a distant third. His commitment to social standing requires him to have all of the latest professional gadgets, including a BlackBerry and a 3G mobile phone. For him, the most important thing is displaying your wealth to all and sundry. Alex usually works for Rupert Sterling at Megabank, but has, in the past, worked for Mr Hardcastle as his Head of Corporate Strategy. He became a Conservative Member of Parliament in 2019 United Kingdom general election.

Penny Masterley (née Wright) is Alex's long-suffering wife. They married very early in the strip's history, and have one son, Christopher. Penny enjoys the affluent lifestyle that Alex provides, but has little patience for Alex's obsessions with status and his work. The two spend very little time together, and are not very close. Alex has cheated on Penny a number of times, including a protracted affair with his secretary, Wendy, in 1991, and a one-night stand with a co-worker while travelling on business in 1998. In 2006, Alex started an affair with a client, Carolyn. Penny came very close to divorcing Alex after the affair with his secretary, and has considered leaving him on other occasions. In the summer of 2009, Penny went out to work (for the first time ever) as a redundancy counsellor: a move that upset Alex as he worried that having a working wife might draw people to conclude that he had himself lost his job. In 2013 Penny's work in the charity sector led to her being headhunted into a career as a company non-executive director. Fast-tracked in the corporate world due to her gender, her professional success has already begun to undermine Alex's standing and self-worth.

Christopher Masterley (born 11 September 1989) is Alex's son. At first, Christopher was very much his father's son, and shares his concern for status and his nose for business. Alex mostly sees Christopher as a symbol of his success, and often makes him a victim of his quest for status. Though initially educated at a top public school, Christopher was withdrawn during the City slump in 2004, when Alex was out of work, and faced the humiliation of leaving the school with a black plastic bag containing his things, a fate city stockbrokers often face, and which was set up by his own father. In 2009 Christopher went to college to study art, much to Alex's chagrin. Christopher is currently unemployed and back living with his parents.

Clive Reed is Alex's co-worker, and even Alex's boss from June 2004 to October 2005 (afterwards he got side-lined by Rupert but refused to resign, thus forced to accept a demotion). Until recently he lived with his longterm girlfriend and subsequent wife Bridget. Although a fellow Oxford graduate, Clive is Alex's inferior in every way. He is less socially skilled, and frequently commits embarrassing gaffes in public. He is less professionally skilled, and often makes bad financial investments or fails to manage his subordinates. Alex enjoys Clive's company because it provides many opportunities to show his superiority. Clive is also a dreadful wimp, and readily retreats from any situation of conflict or difficulty. In spite of this, Clive is something of a womaniser, and has enjoyed a moderate amount of success. In particular, Clive had a long and guilt-ridden affair with an American colleague Ruth while he was engaged to Bridget. Clive also enjoys just enough professional success to maintain his career and his affluent lifestyle. In August 2008, Clive was made redundant, a fact Alex knew but used to win a bet. However, he soon returned after it emerged that the bank had fired the wrong Clive Reed.

Bridget Mann is Clive's ex-wife. Unlike the pleasant Penny, Bridget has a calculating and sadistic temperament. She takes delight in any opportunity to expose Clive for the wimp and loser that he is. This, together with the affluent lifestyle that Clive somehow manages to provide, seems to have been her main reason for staying with him. In 2013, Clive and Bridget had a pair of twins, after years of failed IVF's; but two years later Clive discovered Bridget in bed with his American boss Cyrus. She subsequently expelled Clive from their house and has sought a divorce, which was finalized by December 2018.

Rupert Sterling is a retired senior bank executive. For many years, he was Alex and Clive's boss, and before retirement he served as senior director at Megabank. He and Alex are on the same wavelength as regards status and appearances. This has not stopped Rupert from sacking Alex on a number of occasions, though never for long. Rupert was once tried and jailed for financial fraud; this did not affect his life style too much: his wife would arrive on visiting day only to be told that her husband was in a meeting.

Greg Masterley is Alex's brother and a reporter. There appears to be little mutual affection or respect between the two siblings. Their elderly parents live in retirement.

Sir Stewart Hardcastle is the stereotypical Northern boss of a manufacturing company. Hardcastle employs Megabank for a lot of his financial work. Bluff and down-to-earth, it is surprising that he puts up with Alex's expensive and flash City ways. Alex worked for him during the City slump in around 2002, though he found every excuse from getting away from Hardcastle's northern-based offices to enjoy the pleasures of London and Ascot. Previously always known as Mr Hardcastle, he was knighted in the Queen's Birthday Honours, 2013.

Vince is a money broker from the dealing floor at Megabank. Representing the 'East End Barrow boy' type, Vince wears white socks, talks in cockney rhyming slang ("flute" = suit, "jam jar" = car) and is ignorant of the finer points of culture and etiquette at Glyndebourne and the Royal Opera that Alex and Clive revel in.

Christian is a European junior working his way through the ranks. Although sometimes described as "Eurotrash" he is actually a sophisticated and highly educated member of a rich French family. He disdains the 'Anglo' culture and in return is often the butt of Alex's jokes. He speaks a number of languages which the other staff find rather frustrating, especially when he and another foreign worker speak out openly — in English rather than French or Spanish about how badly the English cricket team is doing. Christian has not appeared in the strip since before the Brexit referendum and his present status is unknown.

Jane was Alex's head of department in 1996. A decisive and masterful figure, he was in awe of her the moment they first met. She herself had an apparently genuine passion for Alex and they had a brief affair. This ended when she had to resign for undisclosed reasons "after a full and frank discussion with the board". Her last act was to send a late night email to all her staff thanking them for showing her "kindness, warmth, respect, personal support, encouragement, loyalty, hospitality and friendship", concluding that all of this was now completely wasted since someone else would be determining their bonuses.

Ruth was Clive's American lover, not seen much lately. An expatriate investment banker and a frequent character in early years, she would appear in strips in which she and her female colleagues would complain about the treatment of women in the City

Shelley is Director of Human Resources at Megabank. While other staff members come and go, her appointment appears to be a permanent one. She was briefly (2002) Rupert Sterling's lover.

Wendy Tanner was Alex's secretary and had an affair with him. When his wife Penny found out they almost divorced, but later made up. Alex decided that there was no future with Wendy and felt it unwise to continue any longer since her probationary period was due to end and it is hard to sack clerical staff once they become full-time.

Cyrus is Alex's God-fearing American head of department who arrived on the scene in 2006, soon after the Megabank merger and the apparent promotion of Rupert to senior banker status. Cyrus is an unabashed workaholic who bows his head during Thanksgiving dinner grace in order to use his Blackberry for work. In spite of his strongly-held religious values Cyrus is currently (2016) having an adulterous affair with Bridget, wife of his subordinate Clive. Bizarrely this led to a duel at dawn with pistols on Hampstead Heath.

Carolyn is Alex's client and mistress, with whom he has been secretly involved. She's herself married, and her husband once challenged Alex in a boxing match after he found out their affair. The relationship, both commercial and romantic, appears to have cooled and Carolyn has not appeared in recent strips.

Faberge is a lapdancer that Clive meets regularly outside work. Clive cannot believe that's not her real name. By contrast with Clive, Faberge appears to have a practical and realistic view of life.

Robin Thorne was a graduate trainee who was employed at Megabank at the time of the dot-com bubble. Being of a new generation, his knowledge and use of the internet made him quite a contrast to Alex. The differences between two generations could be quite big with one having to painstakingly explain to the other how everything worked and being frustrated when they seemed unable to grasp basic essentials: like Robin using the internet to order sandwiches and get Alex's drycleaning done without having to do it himself and denying Alex the pleasure of demeaning him in the process. When the dot-com bubble burst, Alex finally got the opportunity to assign such tasks to Robin, who eventually left the bank. Alex was later asked to contact the head of a start-up hedge fund who, instead of being wined and dined, would be quite satisfied with sandwiches in his office: the potential client was Robin, who sent Alex out to get the sandwiches. As a result of the 2008 financial crisis, Robin's business went bust in early 2009 and he called on Alex for a possible job back at Megabank. Since they had done a lot of business with the hedge fund Alex felt that it was only fair to grant him an interview, give him 30 seconds to give his best three investment ideas and then leave — Alex getting pleasure by treating Robin the way he had treated him. To make ends meet, Robin later turned his home into a bed and breakfast, and ended up serving meals to Alex again.

Justin is a banker who successfully stood as a candidate for the Conservative Party in the 2010 UK General Election. He claimed his motivation for wishing to enter politics was his disgust at the recent United Kingdom Parliamentary expenses scandal, but then revealed that he had funded his campaign via various bogus claims on his expense account at the bank. Alex offered a job exchange to Justin during the 2019 United Kingdom general election, with Alex taking up Justin's place as MP and Justin resuming his bank career.

== Books ==
Alex cartoons are collected into annual volumes.

- Alex (1987)
- The Unabashed Alex (1988)
- Alex II: Magnum Force (1989)
- Alex III: Son Of Alex (1990)
- Alex IV: The Man With The Golden Handshake (1991)
- Alex V: For The Love Of Alex (1992)
- Alex Calls The Shots (1993)
- Alex Plays The Game (1994)
- Alex Knows The Score (1995)
- Alex Sweeps The Board (1996)
- Alex Feels The Pinch (1997)
- The Alex Omnibus (collects strips from 1987 to 1992)
- The Full Alex (collects strips from 1987 to 1998)
- The Alex Technique (1999)
- The Best Of Alex 1998–2001
- The Best of Alex 2002 to The Best of Alex 2020 (annual collections)

== Stage play ==
Alex was turned into a stage play by Peattie and Taylor and was performed at the Arts Theatre, London in October, 2007. Robert Bathurst portrayed the titular character in a one-man act assisted by animated cartoons of the other characters and the various locations. The plot revolved around Alex finding his personal and professional life in crisis when his wife Penny leaves him and a deal involving his perennial client Mr Hardcastle threatens to go sour. With his trademark cynical machinations Alex manages to turn both situations to his advantage and come out on top. Bathurst took Alex on an international tour, beginning in Melbourne, Australia in September 2008 and concluding in London in December. During the tour, it was announced that Bathurst would reprise the role of Alex in a film adaptation that was being developed by independent production company BreakThru Films. The film is to be a live-action/animation hybrid. Since the initial announcement, no further information has been published, though a trailer exists, suggesting a film of some form has been made.

== Radio adaptation ==
Bathurst reprised the role in 2010 in a radio version of Alex, broadcast in ten weekly episodes on Classic FM. The show did not mention that Alex was a fictional character voiced by an actor and – in the manner of Orson Welles’ The War of the Worlds radio broadcast – many listeners believed that they were listening to a real banker airing his controversial opinions on national radio (the 2008 financial crisis was in full swing and bankers were persona non grata at the time). In 2011, the show won a Media Week award and a Sony Award for Best Branded Content.

== Controversy ==
In 2017 the cartoon introduced a transgender character, Stephanie. She was an old-school, middle-aged boss transitioning to being a woman, but attempting to retain her previous privileges. The character was intended to draw attention to gender disparities. However The New Zealand Herald dropped Alex on 11 April 2019 following complaints from some readers about the character. Stephanie has not appeared in the strip since.
