= Patrick Bou Abboud =

Lebanese basketball player (born 1987)

No. 9 – Sagesse SC
- Position: Forward
- League: Lebanese Basketball League

Personal information
- Born: July 24, 1987 (age 39) Beirut
- Listed height: 6 ft 7 in (2.01 m)
- Listed weight: 99 kg (218 lb)

Career information
- Playing career: 2004–present

Career history
- 2004–2005: Champville SC
- 2005–2006: Hekmeh BC
- 2006–2007: Ghazir Club SC
- 2007–2009: Antranik SC
- 2009–2010: Hekmeh BC
- 2010–2011: Champville SC
- 2011–2012: Bejjeh SC
- 2012–2015: Hekmeh BC
- 2015–2016: Tadamon Zouk
- 2016–2017: Hekmeh BC
- 2017–2018: Antonine Club SC
- 2018—2019: Homenetmen Beirut BC
- 2019—2020: Beirut First Club BC
- 2024–present: Sagesse Club

Patrick Bou Abboud (born July 24, 1987) is a professional Lebanese basketball player for Sagesse Club in the Lebanese Basketball League. He previously played with Sagesse SC, Homenetmen Beirut BC, Champville SC, Antranik SC, Bejjeh SC, and Tadamon Zouk.

== LBL career statistics ==
Legend
GP	Games played	GS	Games started	MPG	Minutes per game
FG%	Field goal percentage	3P%	3-point field goal percentage	FT%	Free throw percentage
RPG	Rebounds per game	APG	Assists per game	SPG	Steals per game
BPG	Blocks per game	PPG	Points per game	**Bold**	Career high

=== Regular season ===
Year	Team	GP	GS	MPG	FG%	3P%	FT%	RPG	APG	SPG	BPG	PPG
2019-2020	Beirut First Club BC	4	4	27.3	41.7	43.8	66.7	5.0	8.3	1.55	1.75	8.3
2018-2019	Homentmen Beirut	23	23	NA	48.5	38.7	91.7	6.4	1.5	NA	NA	8.5
2017-2018	Antonine Club	26	26	28	41.5	30.4	72.9	6.22	2.14	1.22	0.59	11.8
2016-2017	Sagesse Club	27	27	NA	40.1	21.3	73.9	5.3	1.5	NA	NA	6.3
2011-2012	Bejjeh Club	23	23	32	40.3	27.8	71.9	7.6	2.3	1.6	1.0	11.9
2009-2010	Sagesse Club	NA	NA	NA	47.2	30.0	63.2	3.7	NA	1.0	NA	6.7
2008-2009	Antranik Club	22	22	NA	38.0	31.3	82.9	6.3	1.8	1.1	NA	9.7
2007-2008	Antranik Club	12	12	NA	48.6	16.7	62.5	5.2	1.8	1.6	NA	7.1
