= London Daily News =

Newspaper in London, published February–July 1987

- Romanized name: London Daily News
- Company type: Newspaper / Media Company
- Website type: Newspaper
- Available in: English
- Founded: 24 February 1987
- Dissolved: 23 July 1987
- Headquarters: London, UK, London, United Kingdom
- Country of origin: United Kingdom
- No. of locations: Main headquarters in London
- Area served: United Kingdom, primarily London
- Owner: Robert Maxwell
- Creator: Robert Maxwell
- Founder: Robert Maxwell
- Chairperson: Robert Maxwell
- CEO: Robert Maxwell
- Industry: Media / Publishing
- Products: Newspaper, News Articles, Cartoons (including Alex)
- Services: Journalism, Print Publication
- Total assets: Estimated at $40 million investment
- Parent: Maxwell Communications Corporation (Robert Maxwell’s company)

The London Daily News was a short-lived London newspaper owned by Robert Maxwell. It was published from 24 February to 23 July 1987. it was designed to challenge the local dominance of the Evening Standard in the London market. Despite significant investment and ambitious plans, the paper struggled to gain a substantial readership and was ultimately forced to shut down after only five months in circulation.

== History ==
The London Daily News was intended to be a "24-hour" paper challenging the local dominance of the Evening Standard. "For the city that never sleeps, the paper that never stops", ran the promotional slogan. The Standard’s owners, Associated Newspapers, responded by reviving the Evening News at a lower price to squeeze the London Daily News out of the market. A price war ensued finishing with the London Daily News selling at 10p and the Evening News at 5p.

Maxwell was dismissive when he heard about the cut-price Evening News. He told the BBC: "The Evening Standard and Lord Rothermere are so worried about their monopoly – which the London Daily News is finally breaking – and so scared about the huge demand for our paper, that they've brought out a cheapo Evening News, which is really a joke." After the London Daily News collapsed, The Evening Standard's publishers, Associated Newspapers, continued the Evening News for some months as a separate brand, aiming for a more downmarket readership than the Evening Standard before re-absorbing it into its sister publication and former rival. The London Daily News was the first home of the Alex cartoon, later published by The Independent and the Daily Telegraph.

Maxwell admitted defeat on 25 July 1987 an hour after paying undisclosed damages to Associated Newspapers for accusing it of lying about the Evening Standard's circulation figures. Starting the London Daily News, which published four editions a day, had cost him $40 million (then about £24.96 million), Reuters estimated. His paper was “selling less than 100,000 copies, when minimum sales targets were 200,000 by this time", Reuters reported Maxwell as commenting.

== Exclusives ==
The paper exposed a scandal relating to war crimes in Sri Lanka when it revealed and confirmed the presence of British mercenaries of the secret KMS unit working with Sri Lankan troops, and the subsequent termination of this following the discovery of atrocities committed against the Tamil population. The KMS mercenaries walked out after complaining that the Sri Lankan Special Task Force "was running out of control and was indiscriminately killing and torturing Tamil civilians". Human Rights Lawyer Karen Parker cited the news article in one of her NGO interventions criticising the Government of Sri Lanka at the United Nations Human Rights Commission.
