= Stephen Cartwright =

British children's book illustrator

- Born: 28 December 1947; Bolton, England
- Died: 12 February 2004 (aged 56)
- Education: Rochdale College of Art, Central Saint Martins College of Arts and Design, Royal College of Art
- Known for: Drawing, illustration, painting
- Notable work: First Thousand Words; Farmyard Tales series

Stephen Cartwright (28 December 1947 – 12 February 2004) was a British children's book illustrator who illustrated more than 150 books which sold millions of copies worldwide. His illustrations are noted for being instantly recognisable and usually depicting open-faced, innocent-looking children and animals.

== Life and career ==
Cartwright was born in Bolton, England, and studied at Rochdale College of Art before moving to London, where he trained at Saint Martin's School of Art, and then at the Royal College of Art to study illustration under Brian Robb and Quentin Blake. Soon after graduating, he joined the new book publishers, Usborne Publishing.

Cartwright's early work has been likened to Dudley Watkins and Leo Baxendale, with his 1970s work incorporating comic strip style, such as in Time Traveller series. Usborne's First Thousand Words, first published in 1979, was Cartwright's first international success and was translated into 55 languages. It was in this book, and ones that followed, that Cartwright incorporated a small yellow duck into his larger illustrations. The reader was prompted to find the duck on each page or find "where's Quacky?" The Times characterised his work from the 1980s onwards as "scenes of contemporary life conveyed a bonhomie which was typical of the artist himself."

Cartwright was married to Di Miggs, with whom he had a son and a daughter.

== Selected Usborne books illustrated by Stephen Cartwright ==
- Civardi, Anne; Graham-Campbell, James (2003). The Usborne Time Traveller Viking Raiders. Usborne. ISBN 978-0-7460-3073-8.
- Rawson, Christopher; Stephen, Cartwright (1979). The Usborne Book of Dragons. Usborne. ISBN 0-86020-336-0.
- Rawson, Christopher; Stephen, Cartwright. The Usborne Book of Witches. Usborne.
- Rawson, Christopher; Stephen, Cartwright. The Usborne Book of Giants. Usborne.
- Rawson, Christopher; Stephen, Cartwright. The Usborne Book of Princes & Princesses. Usborne.
- Rawson, Christopher; Stephen, Cartwright. The Usborne Book of Gnomes, Goblins & Fairies. Usborne.
- Rawson, Christopher; Stephen, Cartwright (1980). The Usborne Book of Wizards. Usborne. ISBN 0-86020-380-8.
- Rawson, Christopher; Stephen, Cartwright (1981). The Usborne Book of Robbers. Usborne. ISBN 0-86020-569-X.

=== Farmyard Tales series ===
Books in the Farmyard Tales series were written by Heather Amery and illustrated by Stephen Cartwright. There is a small yellow duck to find on every page. Titles include:

- Pig Gets Stuck
- The Naughty Sheep
- Barn on Fire
- The Runaway Tractor
- Pig Gets Lost
- The Hungry Donkey
- Scarecrow's Secret
- Tractor in Trouble
- The Grumpy Goat
- The Snow Storm
- Dolly and the Train
- The Old Steam Train
- Camping Out
- Rusty's Train Ride
- The Silly Sheepdog
- Woolly Stops the Train
- Market Day
- Kitten's Day Out
- The New Pony
- Surprise Visitors
- Farmyard Tales Farm Animals Jigsaw Book
- Farmyard Tales Christmas Jigsaw Book
- Farmyard Tales Snowy Christmas Jigsaw Book
- Poppy and Sam's Sticker Book
- Poppy and Sam's Telling the Time Book
- The Complete Farmyard Tales; contains 8 Farmyard Tales stories.
- The Usborne Book of Farmyard Tales.
- The Usborne Book of More Farmyard Tales (1990).
- Even More Farmyard Tales (1993).
- The Usborne Book of Lots More Farmyard Tales (1995); available in hardcover.
- Farmyard Tales Treasury (2006).
- Farmyard Tales Christmas Flap Book (2010)
- Poppy and Sam Complete Book of Farmyard Tales (2013; reissue 2025); available in hardcover.
- The Complete Book of Farmyard Tales (2013); contains 20 Farmyard Tales stories.
- Usborne Farmyard Tales Collection, (2016); 20 books boxed set.
- Children's Cookbook, written by Fiona Watt, illustrated by Stephen Cartwright, featuring the Poppy and Sam characters from Farmyard Tales.
- Children's Cookbook, reissue, written by Abigail Wheatley.
