= Jörg Madlener =

German painter, engraver and stage designer

Jörg Madlener (1939 in Düsseldorf, Germany) is a German painter, engraver and stage designer.

== Early life and education ==
Jörg Madlener was born on September 8, 1939, in Düsseldorf, Germany. His father, Max Madlener, was a surgeon and disciple of Ferdinand Sauerbruch with whom he worked at the Charité Hospital in Berlin. His mother, Hildegard Pape, was an interior designer. After receiving his undergraduate diploma in architecture in Darmstadt he continued his studies in 1960 at the Städelschule in Frankfurt where he studied under professor Heinz Battke. Afternoons he was auditor at lectures and seminars by Theodor Adorno and Max Horkheimer at the Johann Wolfgang Goethe University in Frankfurt.

In 1963 he was private student of Otto Dix in Hemmenhofen at the lake of Constance. Otto Dix taught Jörg Madlener the technique of egg-oil tempera and working with glazing.

In 1964 Jörg Madlener moved to Belgium and continued studying art at the Royal Institute of Fine Arts in Antwerp under Jos Hendrickx.

Jörg Madlener moved to the USA in 1999, where he lives and works in the Catskills [Claryville].

== Work ==
Jörg Madlener's first solo exhibition in 1965 at the Galerie Le Creuset in Brussels displayed a group of paintings, which were strongly influenced by the work of German painter Max Beckmann.

Starting in 1975 Madlener's work was bound to large themes that he followed over years, inspired by Robert Musil, Death in Venice (Thomas Mann and Luchino Visconti), Gustav Mahler's The Song of the Earth, Jackson Pollock.

Madlener's 32 portraits of Gustav Mahler are made with a wide range of visual vocabulary from a single photograph of the composer Gustav Mahler.

His works can be found at museums around the globe including the Solomon R. Guggenheim Museum in New York, the Albertina in Vienna, the Museum of Modern Art in Brussels and the Bayerische Staatsgemäldesammlung in Munich. Public and private collections in Belgium, Luxembourg, Switzerland, the Netherlands, France, Spain, Italy, Germany, the United States and the United Arab Emirates own his paintings.

In 2019 and 2020, his recent works about the Civil War in Syria and other war-related series will be shown at the former Royal Stables (now belonging to Royal Academies for Science and the Arts of Belgium) in Brussels, at the Energy Park Saerbeck, Germany (in a remodeled bunker of the Cold War) and in Worms, Germany.

== Stage design ==
Jörg Madlener worked with many world-renowned theatre stages as a stage and set designer. He worked on following plays:

- 1986 Den Haag, Haagse Comedie, Don Juan, by Molière
- 1986 Bruxelles, Théâtre National de Belgique, Les Fourberies de Scapin, by Molière
- 1977 Saarbrücken, National Sarreland Théâtre, A Midsummer Night Dream, by Shakespeare
- 1964 Bruxelles, Théâtre de l'Alliance, La Ballade du Grand Macabre, by Michel de Chelderode
- 1961 Frankfurt am Main, Neue Bühne at Frankfurt University, The New Mendoza, by J.M. Lenz and Mystero Buffo

== Exhibitions ==
Notable solo exhibitions include

- 2026 Transit Art Office, Mechelen, Paintings 1961-2026
- 2026 Polemos-Potamos in Enapter Campus, Saerbeck, Germany
- 2016 Liquid Art House, Boston
- 2015 ICCC Woodbourne New York
- 2010 Residenz Kempten, Germany
- 2010 Galerie Transit, Mechelen, Belgium
- 1985 Philippe Guimiot Gallery Brussels
- 1985 Esibeth Franck Gallery, kkonookke - le Zout, Belgium
- 1982 Palais des Beaux-Arts, Bruxelles
- 1981 B.P.I. Centre Pompidou, Paris
- 1978 Kunsthalle, Darmstadt
- 1977 Saarlandmuseum, Moderne Galerie
- 1973 Oldenburg Museum
- 1973 Musée des Beaux-Arts, Charleroi
- 1972 Museum D'hondt Dhaenens, Gent

Madlener participated in several international biennales

- 1983 Biennale São Paulo, Brazil, Belgian Pavilion
- 1981 Biennale Venice, Belgian pavilion, Death in Venice
- 1981 Sofia Triennale
- 1972 Venice Biennale, Grafica Oggi
- 1971 International Engraving Biennale, Ljubljana, Jugoslawien
- 1965 International Engraving Biennale, Ljubljana, Jugoslawien

== Future reading ==
- Jörg Madlener, Kassandra, Herausgeber Joch, Peter, London; Blurb, 2010
- Gesichtslos: die Malerei des Diffusen; Eugène Carrière, John Beard, Jörg Madlener, Joe Allen, Rainer Lind, 2009
- Ausgewählt! Neuerwerbungen aus der Graphischen Sammlung 2000 bis 2005 [anlässlich der Ausstellung Ausgewählt! Neuerwerbungen aus der Graphischen Sammlung 2000 bis 2005, 9. März - 4. Juni 2006] / Graphische Sammlung, Hessisches Landesmuseum Darmstadt, 2006 (ISBN 3-926527-78-1)
- Jörg Madlener - paintings, New York, 1999
- Jörg Madlener, Grenzüberschreitungen: Variationen zu Gustav Mahler u. Thomas Mann; e. Ausstellung d. Bad. Landesbibliothek / mit e. Einf. von Christel Römer. In Zusammenarbeit mit d. Galerie Paepcke, 1986 (ISBN 978-3-88705-015-3)
- Jörg Madlener - The mountain and the woodman’s hut, Brussels: Philippe Guimiot Art Gallery, 1986
- Jörg Madlener, [le chant de la terre; peintures 1983-1984, d'après la symphonie de Lieder de Gustav Mahler et les poèmes de Wang-Wei, Li-Tai-Po, Tchang-Tsi, Mong-Kao-Yen]; Paris, Grand Palais FIAC, 84 [20-28 octobre], Madrid, Palacio de Cristal, Arco 85, 1984
- Der Tod in Venedig: Hommage à Thomas Mann et Luchino Visconti; Zeichn., Aquarelle u. Gemälde von Jörg Madlener, Jan Vanriet; Kunsthalle am Steubenplatz, 24.9. - 29.10.1978 / Kunstverein Darmstadt, 1978
