= Patrick Thomas (graphic artist) =

British graphic artist

- Born: 1965 (age 59–60); Liverpool, England
- Occupation: Graphic artist

Patrick Thomas is an English-born graphic artist. He has illustrated book reviews and opinion pieces in The New York Times. Thomas was born in Liverpool in 1965, and lives in Berlin.

== Work ==
A billboard Thomas created depicting a horse with the title "Moo" was displayed at the Leicester Square tube station in London as promotion for the Affordable Art Fair. The poster appeared in the midst of a horse-meat scandal involving the queen. The controversy arose when six carcasses tainted with the anti-inflammatory drug, a potential carcinogen, exported to France in May 2019, may have entered the food chain and been eaten by the Queen and members of the Royal Family after the horse meat was passed off as beef. Thomas commented that it "is the job of an artist to be witness to his time in history and art should have a social function and be an intrinsic part of everyday life."

He regularly contributes illustrations to The New York Times Book Review. His works were featured in a March 2009 exhibition at The New York Times' Gallery 7.

Thomas' Protest Stencil Toolkit is a set of graffiti stencils sold in book form. The stencils are designed to facilitate the creation of protest graphics in public spaces.

Thomas has lived in Berlin since 2011 and has an artist's studio in Neukölln, Berlin.

== Publications ==
- Black and White, Paperback, 96 pp. Studio laVista, Barcelona, Spring 2005, Languages: English, Spanish, Catalan, ISBN 84-609-5046-8
- Protest Stencil Toolkit Paperback, 144 pp. Laurence King Publishing, London, May 2011, Language: English, ISBN 978-1-85669-766-8.
