= Richard Grunberger =

British historian

Richard Grunberger (7 March 1924 Vienna, Austria – 15 February 2005) was a British historian who specialised in study of the Third Reich.

He was born in Austria to Jewish parents. His father died when he was young, and he was raised by his mother in relatively difficult economic circumstances. After the 1938 Anschluss with Hitler's Germany, he was put on the first Kindertransport train to leave Vienna. He was initially housed in a refugee camp at Lowestoft in England. After this he lived with a Jewish family, who were West End tailors in London, and later was interned on the Isle of Mann. Grunberger entered their tailoring business. His desire for education however led to his taking A levels at Birkbeck college. He gained an exhibition scholarship in history at King's College London.

When he went to the Wiener Library in London, he expressed to a friend his frustration at the absence of a book that held together the masses of documentation surrounding Nazism and 20th-century Germany. A friend asked why he did not write one, and so he did. The product was A Social History of the Third Reich, first published in 1971 by Weidenfeld & Nicolson. It has since become a significant text for studying the social history of Nazi Germany in schools and at undergraduate level.

Initially, much of Grunberger's leisure time in Britain was taken up by the communist youth group Young Austria, which functioned as a substitute family for him. However, he grew disillusioned with communism, and in his political outlook became a staunch social democrat. He was a critical supporter of the State of Israel.

== Publications ==
- A Social History of the Third Reich
- Germany 1918–1945
- Hitler's S.S.
- Red Rising in Bavaria
