= Al-Abud Network =

Iraqi insurgent group

The al-Abud Network is a former insurgent group who was operating within Iraq during the Iraq War. First reported in the "Comprehensive Report of the Special Advisor to the DCI on Iraq's WMD", the group is alleged to have attempted to acquire chemical weapons for use in fighting against Coalition Forces (source).

== Membership ==
The al-Abud network was primarily composed of members of Jaysh Muhammad (JM), an anti-Coalition group motivated by both political and religious elements. The politically motivated faction of JM has strong ties to the Sufi region, which once was highly favored by Saddam during his rule. The Sufi region was home to many former Iraqi security forces, intelligence officers as well as police officers. It is believed through their former standing, political affiliations and business relationships, the group is able to acquire chemical precursors and weapons such as mortars through a "pre-OIF supply infrastructure." It is believed by the Iraq Survey Group that Jaysh Muhammad and Fallujah based insurgents were able to acquire chemical munitions, however those munitions were not yet located.

== Actions ==
The al-Abud Network recruited, in late 2003, an Iraqi chemist in attempts to develop tabun, and mustard agents. The group was able to acquire malathion pesticide and nitrogen mustard precursors, however it is believed they were unable to acquire further precursors for the final stages. From interrogation of key suspects in the 2004 raids against the network, the Iraq Survey Group (ISG) was able to ascertain the final goal of the group was to use the chemical agents within a mortar round, possibly for firing or detonation as an improvised chemical device. In December 2003, the recruited chemist failed to produce tabun, they did however create a poisonous compound due to the mixing of malathion with other precursors of tabun. In total nine mortar rounds were "weaponized" with the created compound. The mortars themselves are stated to have been an ineffective means of dispersal, due to the likelihood of the poison being consumed in the explosion. Following the failure to create tabun, the insurgent group focused on attempting to create nitrogen mustard in February 2004.

The al-Abud network recruited another chemist, one with more experience, who owned a small chemical lab in Baghdad. This chemist was unable however to produce the nitrogen mustard or binary mustard as the group had wanted. In mid-2004 this chemist was arrested and the contents of his lab seized. During the arrest it was noted the chemist had managed to produce small quantities of ricin, in the form of ricin cakes, a substance that can easily be turned into poisonous toxic ricin. This chemist also created napalm and sodium fluoroacetate for the Jaysh Muhammad insurgents. It is currently believed the al-Abud network has been neutralized, however the leaders of the group as well as financiers remain at large and, the chemical munitions created remain unaccounted for.

== See also ==
- Jaysh Muhammad
- Iraq War
