= Alan Aboud =

Irish graphic designer

Alan Aboud (born 13 May 1966) is an Irish graphic designer and creative director, from Dublin, Ireland. He was educated at Belvedere College, Dublin from 1974 to 1984 and the National College of Art & Design (NCAD), Dublin where he completed his foundation year and began his degree in graphic design before transferring to Saint Martin's School of Art in London in 1986. He graduated from there in 1989, with a first class honours degree.

== Life and career ==
He founded the creative agency Aboud Sodano in 1989 with fellow Saint Martin's student and photographer Sandro Sodano.

The pair enjoyed a loose creative association for many years combining Alan's talent for art direction and typography with Sandro's distinctive image making. In 2007, Aboud Sodano became Aboud Creative, when their full-time collaboration ceased.

For over 20 years, the agency worked with fashion, beauty, fragrance and lifestyle brands including Paul Smith (Sir Paul Smith), Levi's, H&M, River Island and Neal's Yard Remedies.

Aboud created the Paul Smith identity using a Multi-stripe textile design originally created for shirting in 1997. Spotted at his degree show by Paul Smith's head buyer in 1989, he began working for Smith two days a week on his advertising and graphic design whilst setting up Aboud Sodano - his working relationship with Smith flourished and continued uninterrupted until June 2015. He continues to work on advertising for PAUL SMITH COLLECTION, the company's Japanese higher line.

He has rebranded his agency to ABOUD+ABOUD, reflecting his move into creative consultancy for agencies such as GREY LONDON, where he collaborates with them on brands such as HUGO BOSS fragrances. The agency also continues to work on editorial design, fashion advertising and more recently Creative Direction for fashion short form films.

Aboud has three children, twins Victor and Milo Keating-Aboud, and a daughter, Georgie Alma Best Aboud.

== Reference material ==
1. you can find inspiration in everything* Paul Smith Published by Violette Editions ISBN 978-1-900828-29-1 Contributor's p. 296

2. New Design London: The Edge of Graphic Design Edited by Edward M. Gomez Published by Rockport Publishers, Inc. ISBN 1-56496-562-7 p. 16

3. The Graphics Book Edited by Jane Austin Published by RotoVision SA ISBN 2-88046-550-8 p. 13

4. Graphics - Real-world graphic design projects - from brief to finished solution Published by Rotovision ISBN 2-88046-315-7 p. 12 - p. 19

5. Graphic Design for the 21st Century 100 of the World's Graphic Designer Published by Taschen ISBN 3-8228-1605-1 p. 38 - p. 43

6. Wear Me: Fashion + Graphics Interaction Edited by Liz Farelly ISBN 1-873968-55-8 p. 144 - p. 153

7. Great Graphics on a Budget Written and Designed by Simon Dixon and Aporva Baxi Published by Rockport Publishers ISBN 1-56496-948-7 p. 96 - p. 99

8. Fashion & Graphics Written by Tamsin Blanchard Published by Laurence King Publishing ISBN 1-85669-338-4 p. 128 - p. 139

9. Problem Solved Written by Michael Johnson Published by Phaidon Press ISBN 0-7148-4174-9 p. 257

10. Communicate: Independent Graphic Design since the Sixties Edited by Rick Poynor Published by Laurence King Publishing ISBN 1-85669-422-4 p. 88

11. Dialogue Relationships in Graphic Design Written by Shaun Cole Published by V&A Publications ISBN 1-85177-434-3 p. 30 - p. 39
