= Robert Bathurst =

Ghanaian-born British actor (born 1957)

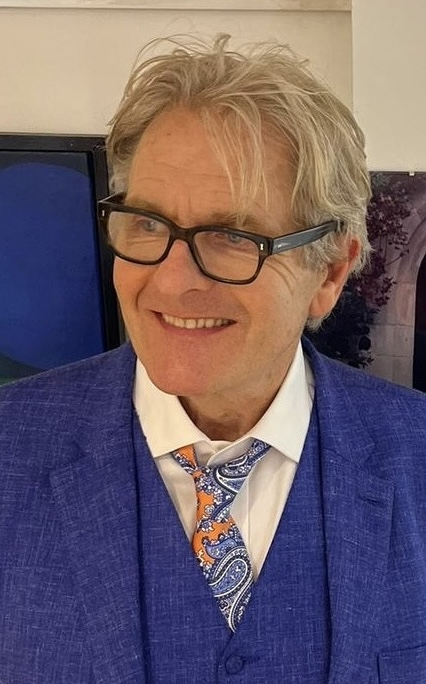
- Robert Bathurst at home in London, May 2025
- Born: Robert Guy Bathurst; February 1957 (age 69); Accra, Gold Coast (now Ghana)
- Education: Pembroke College, Cambridge
- Occupation: Actor
- Years active: 1977–present
- Works: Full list
- Spouse: Victoria Threlfall (m. 1985)
- Children: 4

Robert Guy Bathurst (born February 1957) is a Ghanaian-born British actor.

== Early life ==
Robert Guy Bathurst was born in Accra, Gold Coast (modern-day Ghana), in February 1957 to Philip Charles Metcalfe Bathurst, a descendant of politician Charles Bathurst and kinsman of the Earls Bathurst and Viscounts Bledisloe, and his wife Gillian (née Debenham). His father was a major in the Royal Engineers during the Second World War and was working in West Africa as a management consultant. His mother was a physiotherapist. They had two other children, Nicholas and Charlotte. The family lived in Ghana until 1959, when they moved to Ballybrack, Dublin, Ireland. Bathurst and his brother attended two schools in Dublin – the Holy Child School in Killiney and a school in Ballsbridge – before being sent to Headfort, a preparatory school in Kells, County Meath. He compared the time he and his brother, who were Catholics, spent at the Anglican boarding school to Lord of the Flies; "we were incarcerated in a huge, stinking, Georgian house, where we were treated very brutally".

In 1966, the family moved to England and Bathurst was sent to board at Worth School in Sussex. At the age of 13, he began acting in minor skits and revues and read old copies of Plays and Players magazine, "studying floor plans of theatres and reading about new theatres being built". He had first become interested in acting when his family saw a pantomime at the Gaiety Theatre in Dublin and he watched actors waiting for their cues in the wings.

Aged 18, Bathurst left school to read law at Pembroke College, Cambridge. He spent much of his time there performing in the Cambridge Footlights alongside Hugh Laurie, Rory McGrath and Emma Thompson. From 1977 to 1978, he was the secretary of the group and, from 1978 to 1979, he was the president. Among the Footlights Revues in which he participated were Stage Fright in 1978, which he also co-wrote and Nightcap in 1979. He also directed and appeared in the Footlights pantomime Aladdin as Widow Twankey during the 1978–79 season. He took the Bar Vocational Course at the University of Law, in London, which allowed him to go on to become a practising barrister, but stuck to acting instead.

== Acting career ==
=== Early career ===
After leaving Cambridge, Bathurst spent a year touring Australia in the Footlights Revue Botham, The Musical, which he described as "a bunch of callow youths flying round doing press conferences and chat shows". Although he enjoyed his work with Footlights, he did not continue performing with the group, worrying that he would be "washed up at 35 having coat-tailed on their success through the early part of [his] career". After leaving, he found that he was considered a dilettante, which resulted in it taking him longer than expected to be accepted as a serious actor. His first professional role out of university was in the BBC Radio 4 series Injury Time, alongside fellow Footlights performers Rory McGrath and Emma Thompson. His first role for television came in 1982, when he appeared as Prince Henry in the pilot episode of Blackadder. He had already appeared in a training video by director Geoff Posner and got the role of Henry by way of thanks. The character was recast and downgraded when the series was commissioned as The Black Adder.

Bathurst's professional stage debut came the next year when he joined the second cast of Michael Frayn's Noises Off at the Savoy Theatre. He replaced Roger Lloyd-Pack as Tim Allgood and stayed at the Savoy for a year. Between roles, he worked as a television presenter for BBC East. After declining an offer to be a presenter of That's Life! he joined the National Theatre in 1984, where he appeared as a background actor in Saint Joan. He regards it as "the most demoralising" job he has ever had but was grateful for the theatre experience it gave him. The following year, he appeared at The Man in the Moon, a pub theatre in Chelsea, in Judgement, a two-hour monologue on cannibalism. The opening night audience was made up of three people but after good reviews in the national press the audience grew to an average of fifteen.

A casting director for the James Bond film The Living Daylights persuaded Bathurst to audition for Bond. Bathurst believes that his "ludicrous audition" was only "an arm-twisting exercise" because the producers wanted to pressure Timothy Dalton to take the role by telling him they were still auditioning other actors. Bathurst noted "I could never have done it – Bond actors are always very different from me".

He continued to make minor appearances in television throughout the 1980s; in 1987, he auditioned for the role of Dave Lister in the BBC North science fiction sitcom Red Dwarf. The part eventually went to Craig Charles but Bathurst was given a role in the first episode of the first series as Frank Todhunter, second officer on the ship, who is killed in the first ten minutes. Ten years later, Bathurst was invited to reprise the role when a storyline in the series allowed former characters to return, but filming commitments prevented him from appearing. In 1989, he appeared in Malcolm Bradbury's Anything More Would Be Greedy for Anglia Television, playing Dennis Medlam, MP. The programme was broadcast in 1990 to little fanfare. In 1990, he performed on Up Yer News, a live topical programme broadcast on BSB.

=== Joking Apart ===
While working on Up Yer News, Bathurst auditioned for a one-off television comedy called Joking Apart. Earlier in the day, he noticed a fellow Up Yer News performer reading the script to prepare for his own audition. As Bathurst went into the audition room, his colleague was leaving and told Bathurst he would "break his legs" if he got the part, a threat that seemed not to be "entirely jocular". Bathurst got the part and the pilot of Joking Apart was broadcast as an installment of the BBC Two Comic Asides strand. It returned for two series in 1993 and 1995. Bathurst appeared as sitcom writer Mark Taylor in the series. After the first series was broadcast, a critic called Bathurst the "Best Comedy Newcomer of 1993".

The show was punctuated by fantasy sequences in which his character performed his thoughts as a stand-up routine in a small club. In the commentary and the interview on the DVD, Bathurst says that he was told that they would be re-shot after filming everything else, an idea abandoned because of the expense. He has an idea of re-filming the sequences 'now', as his older self, to give them a more retrospective feeling. He has also said that he believes Mark was too "designery" and wishes that he had "roughened him up a bit". The role is his favourite of his whole career; he has described it as "the most enjoyable job I will ever do" and considers several episodes of the series to be "timeless, beautifully constructed farces which will endure". Bathurst is often recognised for his appearance in this series, mentioning that "Drunks stop me on public transport and tell me details of the plot of their favourite episode". As punishment for arriving late for the series one press launch at the Café Royal in Regent Street, London, writer Steven Moffat pledged to write an episode in which Mark is naked throughout. To a large extent, this vow is realised in the second series.

Between 1991 and 1995, Bathurst also appeared on television in No Job for a Lady, The House of Eliott and The Detectives and on stage in The Choice, George Bernard Shaw's Getting Married at Chichester with Dorothy Tutin and Gogol's The Nose adapted by Alastair Beaton, which played in Nottingham and Bucharest. He also filmed a role in The Wind in the Willows (Terry Jones, 1996) as St John Weasel.

=== Wider recognition ===
In 1996, while appearing in The Rover at the Salisbury Playhouse, Bathurst got an audition for the Granada Television comedy pilot Cold Feet. He arrived for the audition "bearded and shaggy", on account of his role in the play, and did not expect to win the role of upper-middle class management consultant David Marsden. The role in the pilot was only minor and created at the last minute to support characters played by James Nesbitt and Helen Baxendale; the only character note in the script about David related to his high salary. Bathurst identified the character as merely a "post-Thatcherite whipping boy".

Bathurst reprised the role in the Cold Feet series, which ran for five years from 1998 to 2003. He described the character of David as an "emotional cripple", originally with little depth. The third series features an affair between David and a political activist played by Yasmin Bannerman. Bathurst appreciated the opportunity to bring some depth to a previously one-dimensional character, but was more impressed with the storylines that came out of the affair, rather than the affair itself: "It was the deception, the guilt and the recrimination rather than the actual affair, which was neither interesting nor remarkable". Like other cast members, Bathurst was able to suggest storylines as the series went on; one episode features David celebrating his fortieth birthday and Bathurst suggested the character could get a Harley-Davidson motorbike. Granada paid for him to take motorcycle lessons and a test. On the day before taking his test, the filming of a scene where David takes off on his new bike was scheduled. Bathurst "wobbled, missed the camera and crashed into the pavement", leading director Simon Delaney to exclaim it was the funniest thing he had ever seen. In another episode, David buys a racehorse – ostensibly as a birthday present for his wife – in a plot born out of Bathurst's own love of horseracing. The role made him more widely recognisable and he often received prospective scripts that were "obvious rewrites of the character". He turned them down, preferring to play a "good person", which would be more interesting from a dramatic point of view.

In 1998, Bathurst appeared in the first episode of the ITV series Hornblower (1998), based on the novels by C.S Forester. Bathurst played the character Lieutenant Eccleston and performed alongside Ioan Gruffudd and Robert Lindsay.

Between 1998 and 2003, he made television appearances in Goodbye, Mr Steadman (2001), starring opposite Caroline Quentin as a shy and unassuming teacher who has been declared dead after one of his pupils erases all computer records relating to him and in the adaptation of White Teeth (2002). On stage, in 1998 he appeared in Michael Frayn's Alarms and Excursions and in 1999 in Hedda Gabler, which was his last theatre role for several years. In the Daily Telegraph, Charles Spencer described his role as Tesman as a "weird casting choice" but called his acting "a brave stab". In 2001, Bathurst appeared in the music video for Westlife's Comic Relief single "Uptown Girl".

In 2002, straight after finishing Cold Feet, Bathurst went straight into filming My Dad's the Prime Minister, a series in which he portrays fictional British prime minister Michael Philips. The first series was broadcast in a Sunday afternoon CBBC slot in 2003. He watched debates in the House of Commons to prepare for the role but did not base his portrayal on Tony Blair. In 2003, he returned to theatre for the first time in four years to play Vershinin in The Three Sisters, opposite Kristin Scott Thomas and Eric Sykes. He had not seen The Three Sisters before starring in it. Director Michael Blakemore advised him to turn this to his advantage, as he would not feel he had to live up to previous portrayals. After its run concluded, a special edition of The Three Sisters was filmed with the same cast for television broadcast on BBC Four. In 2005, the second series of My Dad's the Prime Minister was broadcast, now moved to a Friday night time slot to take advantage of the adult humour. The same year, he starred in the ITV thriller The Stepfather playing Christopher Veazey, a man whose daughter goes missing. Bathurst was pleased that this white-collar worker had an emotional side, in comparison to David Marsden, whom he used as a yardstick when accepting those sorts of roles. Also in 2005, he played Mr Sesseman in an adaptation of Heidi and Dottore Massimo in The Thief Lord.

=== 2006–present ===
In 2006, he played Mark Thatcher in Coup!, a dramatisation of the attempted coup in Equatorial Guinea. He also starred as Adrien opposite Nicholas Tennant in the UK premiere of Members Only at the Trafalgar Studios. He accepted the part because it was "funny, plausible, plausibly absurd and cruel" and he liked that it was a translation from an original French play (Cravate club). He enjoyed working on it, telling What's on Stage: "Nick is a really good actor and really good to work with in that you can have completely frank discussions about tiny issues and it's totally ego-free. We're all just discussing the point and not playing games with each other. It does make the working practice easier. If there's only two of you in a play, you are equally responsible – there's nobody else to blame if it goes wrong. So its a greater risk and there's no hiding". At the end of the year, he appeared opposite Richard Wilson in Whipping it Up, a play about whips in a fictional David Cameron government. To research his role, he watched more Commons debates. In 2006, Bathurst also appeared in an episode of Agatha Christie's Poirot 2005 where he played Gilbert Entwhistle in After the Funeral.

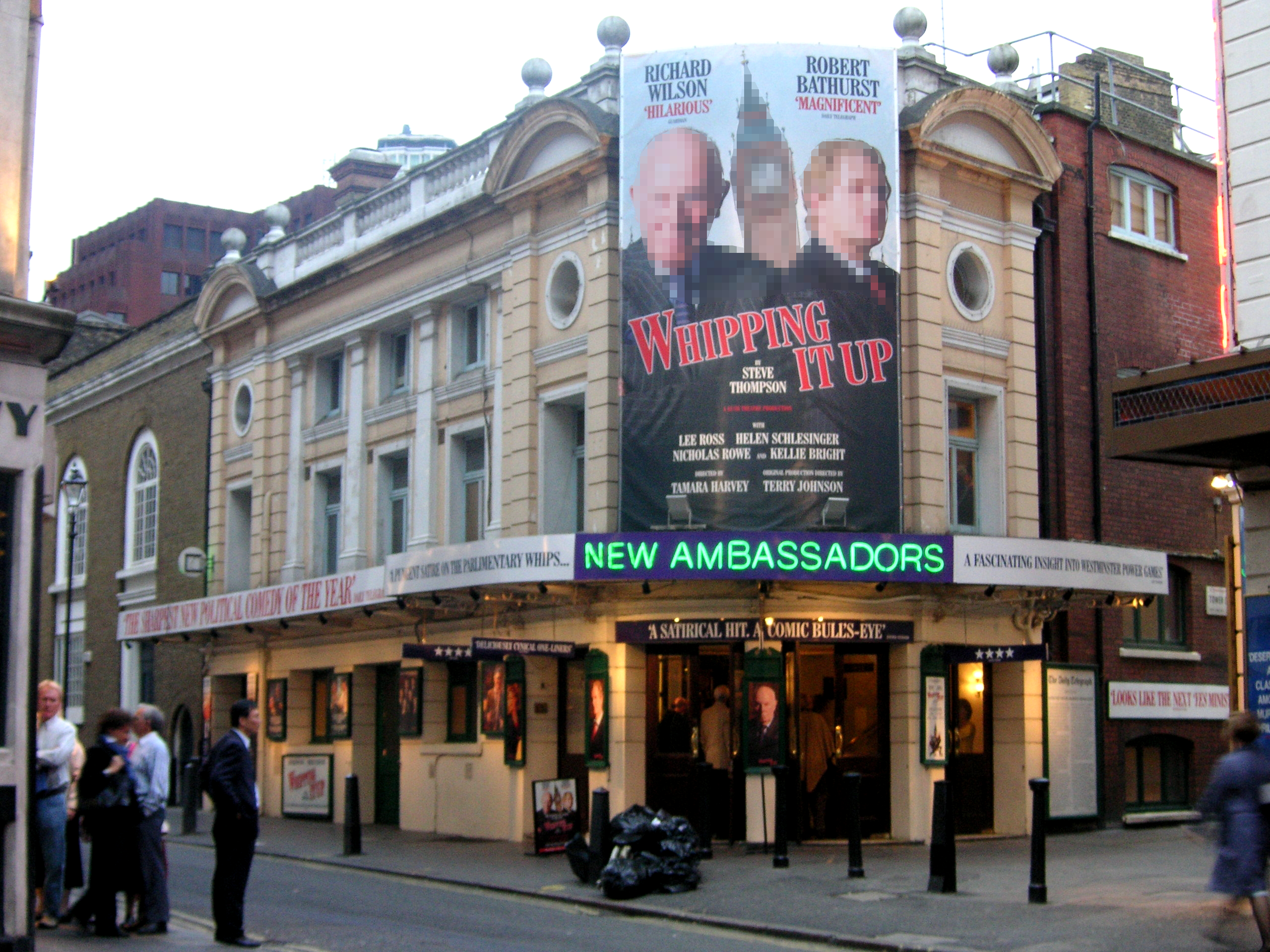
The Ambassadors Theatre, where Bathurst appeared in a theatrical play Whipping It Up

After a season at the Bush Theatre at the end of 2006, Whipping it Up transferred to the New Ambassadors Theatre from March to June 2007. The tour coincided with his appearance as the titular character in Alex, based on the comic in The Daily Telegraph. The play ran at the Arts Theatre between October and November 2007 and featured Bathurst interacting with other characters projected onto a screen behind him. He was attracted to the role because of the "duplicity and guile" Alex uses to get himself out of tight situations. The role won him a nomination for Best Solo Performance at the What's on Stage Awards. He reprised the role in an international tour from September to November 2008, playing in Melbourne, Sydney, Hong Kong, Singapore and Dubai. As Alex he presented a ten-part series on Classic FM, which won a Gold Award at the Sony Radio Academy Awards in 2012. He now performs Alex as a corporate after-dinner entertainment. 2007 also saw Bathurst perform as linguist Charles in the first series of the BBC Radio 4 sitcom Hut 33. He reprised the role for two more series in 2008 and 2009.

In 2009, he made his third and final appearance as art dealer James Garrett in My Family. He also played the role of Mr Weston in the BBC costume drama Emma, which was broadcast in October 2009 on BBC One. He previously played Weston in a two-part adaptation of Emma for BBC Radio 4 in 2000. Between January and April 2010, Bathurst starred as Garry Essendine in a national touring revival of Noël Coward's Present Laughter. He had not seen Present Laughter before, though had seen several Coward plays in his 20s and did not imitate Coward's speech patterns while performing. Present Laughter was the first time Bathurst had appeared in a Coward play and he was cast in another, Blithe Spirit, later in the year, as Charles Condomine. The play toured theatres around southern England in 2010 and early 2011 before beginning a three-month run at the Apollo Theatre in London.

On television in 2010, Bathurst starred as Percy Hamleigh in the German-Canadian miniseries The Pillars of the Earth and had a recurring role as widower Sir Anthony Strallan in the period drama Downton Abbey. In 2011 he starred as John Le Mesurier in the Hattie Jacques biopic Hattie, and joined the cast of the long-running ITV drama Wild at Heart.

He also has a recurring role in the comedy series Toast of London.

In 2014 he appeared in the Midsomer Murders “The Flying Club” as Perry Darnley. Bathurst is to star as Andy in the upcoming Sky1 television film television film adaptation of the M. C. Beaton novel Agatha Raisin: The Quiche of Death as Andy Cummings-Browne (2014).

In September 2016, Bathurst reprised his role of David Marsden in Cold Feet.

In 2019 Bathurst portrayed Sergeant Wilson in Dad's Army: The Lost Episodes, a recreation of three missing episodes of the BBC comedy Dad's Army. He also portrayed Jeffrey Bernard in Jeffrey Bernard Is Unwell at the Coach and Horses in Greek Street, Soho. Bathurst said he jumped at the opportunity: "It’s so obviously a good idea, and appealingly odd. It brings Jeffrey Bernard’s journalism on to the stage, his own version of himself, not necessarily how others saw him." He added: "It’s a brilliantly funny, sour and surprisingly moving manifesto for the right of people to destroy their liver and wallet in any way they choose."

== Personal life ==
Bathurst met artist Victoria Threlfall through mutual friends and they married in 1985. They have four daughters: Matilda, Clemency, Oriel and Honor.

== Radio ==
- Richard Barton: General Practitioner! (1997)
- Bathurst portrayed Professor Charles Gardner – the ultra-conservative snob and don who rejected Archie from Oxford for not knowing how to use a fish knife at the dinner table – in Hut 33 for BBC Radio 4.
- The Golden Age (2012) - 3 episodes. Written by Arthur Mathews

== Written works ==
- Bathurst, Robert (4 December 2001). "Yes, Cold Feet beat Trollope, but at what cost?". The Daily Telegraph: p. 17.
- Bathurst, Robert (25 October 2008). "Alex tour: Getting Brezhnev to smile would have been easier". The Daily Telegraph: p. 26 (Review section)
- Bathurst, Robert (7 March 2009). "It's their loss (but our pain)". The Independent
