= Paul Vanstone =

British sculptor (born 1967)

- Education: London
- Known for: Sculpture
- Notable work: Marble figures, bronze statues and busts

Paul Vanstone (born 1967) is a British sculptor. His influences include Henry Moore and Zaha Hadid.

Vanstone studied sculpture at Saint Martin's School of Art going on to obtain an MFA at the Royal College of Art in 1993. He worked for five years as assistant to British sculptor Anish Kapoor and has received several awards and commissions, including the Darwin Scholarship in 1990 and the Henry Moore Award in 1991, and has twice received the Lord and Lady Carrington Sculpture Garden Commission in 1991 and 1996. Vanstone has had work displayed in major galleries, including the British Museum and the Victoria and Albert Museum. Amongst his commissioned sculptures are those of Derek Dooley and Joe Shaw at Bramall Lane, Sheffield and of Lawrence Dallaglio.

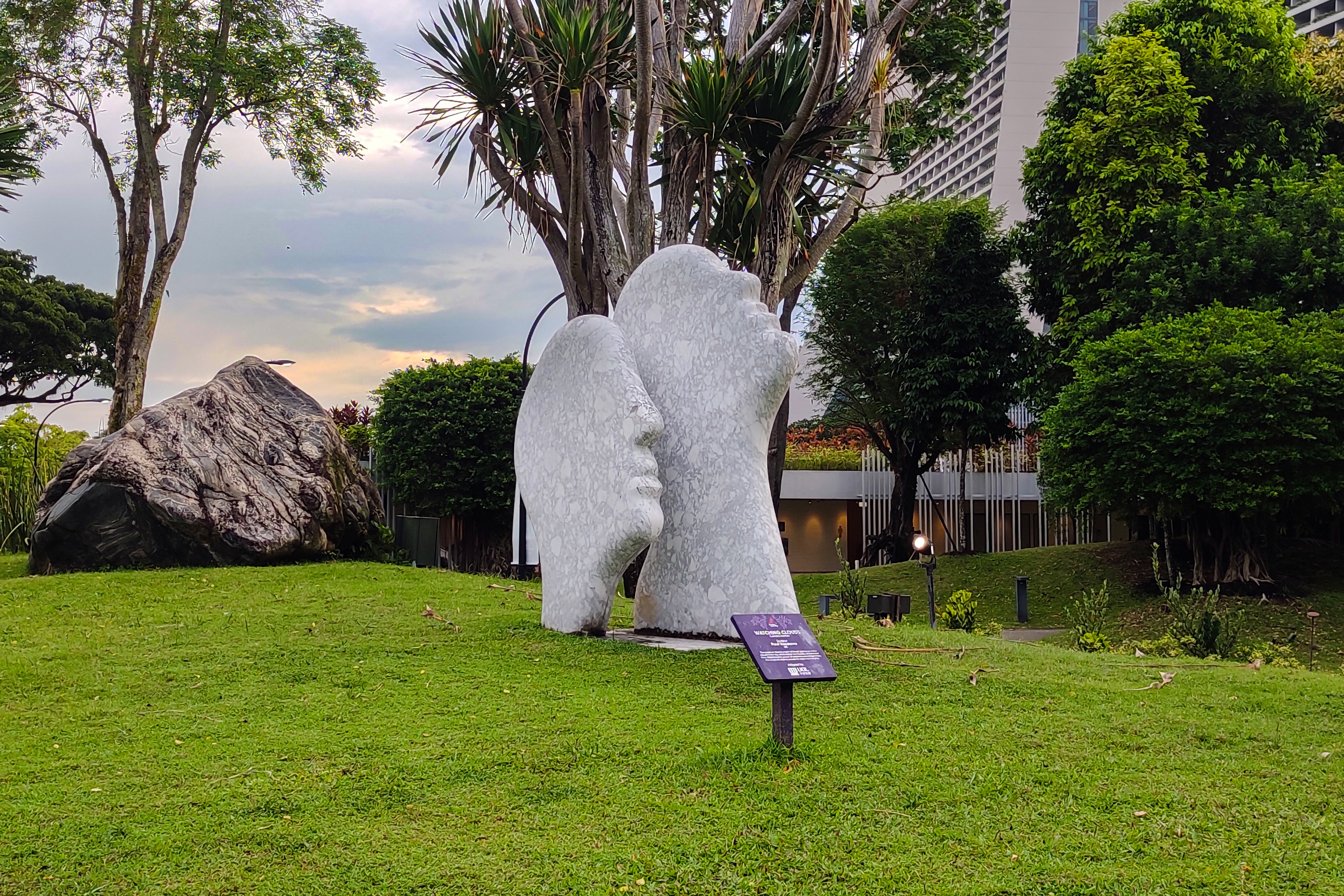
Watching Clouds, Gardens by the Bay, Singapore.
