= Roland Brener =

Canadian artist (1942–2006)

- Born: February 22, 1942; Johannesburg, South Africa
- Died: March 22, 2006 (aged 64); Victoria, British Columbia, Canada
- Education: St. Martin's School of Art
- Known for: Sculptor
- Movement: Abstract art, modernism, postmodernism
- Spouse: Dama Hanks-Brener

Roland Brener RCA (February 22, 1942 – March 22, 2006) was a South African-born Canadian artist.

== Life ==
Brener was born Roland Albert Brener on February 22, 1942, in Johannesburg. He studied art at Saint Martin's School of Art with Anthony Caro. He completed his academic training in 1965, and in 1967, Brener was one of the founders of the Stockwell Depot, a studio and exhibition space occupying part of a disused brewery in south London.

Brener taught at Saint Martin's, at the University of California, Santa Barbara and at the University of Iowa before being appointed Associate Professor at the University of Victoria in British Columbia in 1974. He retired from teaching in 1997 and continued to live and work in Victoria, British Columbia, Canada until his death in 2006.

== Work ==
Brener's early practice grew from the formalist innovations of his contemporaries at Saint Martin's. During the 1980s, his work developed a more playful individuality as he began to incorporate consumer items, most often toys, and experiment with kinetic sculpture driven by electronic motors or computers. In his later work, he began to use the computer as a design tool to produce fantastical distortions of everyday images and objects, which were then fabricated in wood or synthetic materials.

== Exhibitions ==
Brener represented Canada at the São Paulo Art Biennial in 1987 and the Venice Biennale in 1988. In 2000, Brener exhibited Swinger at Deitch Projects in New York, and in 2006 he was in Part Two, a duo exhibition with Mowry Baden at the Art Gallery of Greater Victoria.

== Public works ==
His public sculpture Radioville, a re-working of his earlier sculptures Endsville and Capital Z, was installed in 2005 on the site of an old CBC radio-antenna tower in central Toronto, Ontario.

== Collections ==
Brener's work is represented in major public collections in Canada, including Toronto's Art Gallery of Ontario and the National Gallery of Canada.

== Awards and honours ==
- Royal Canadian Academy of Arts
