= Charles Peattie =

British cartoonist (born 1958)

Charles Peattie MBE
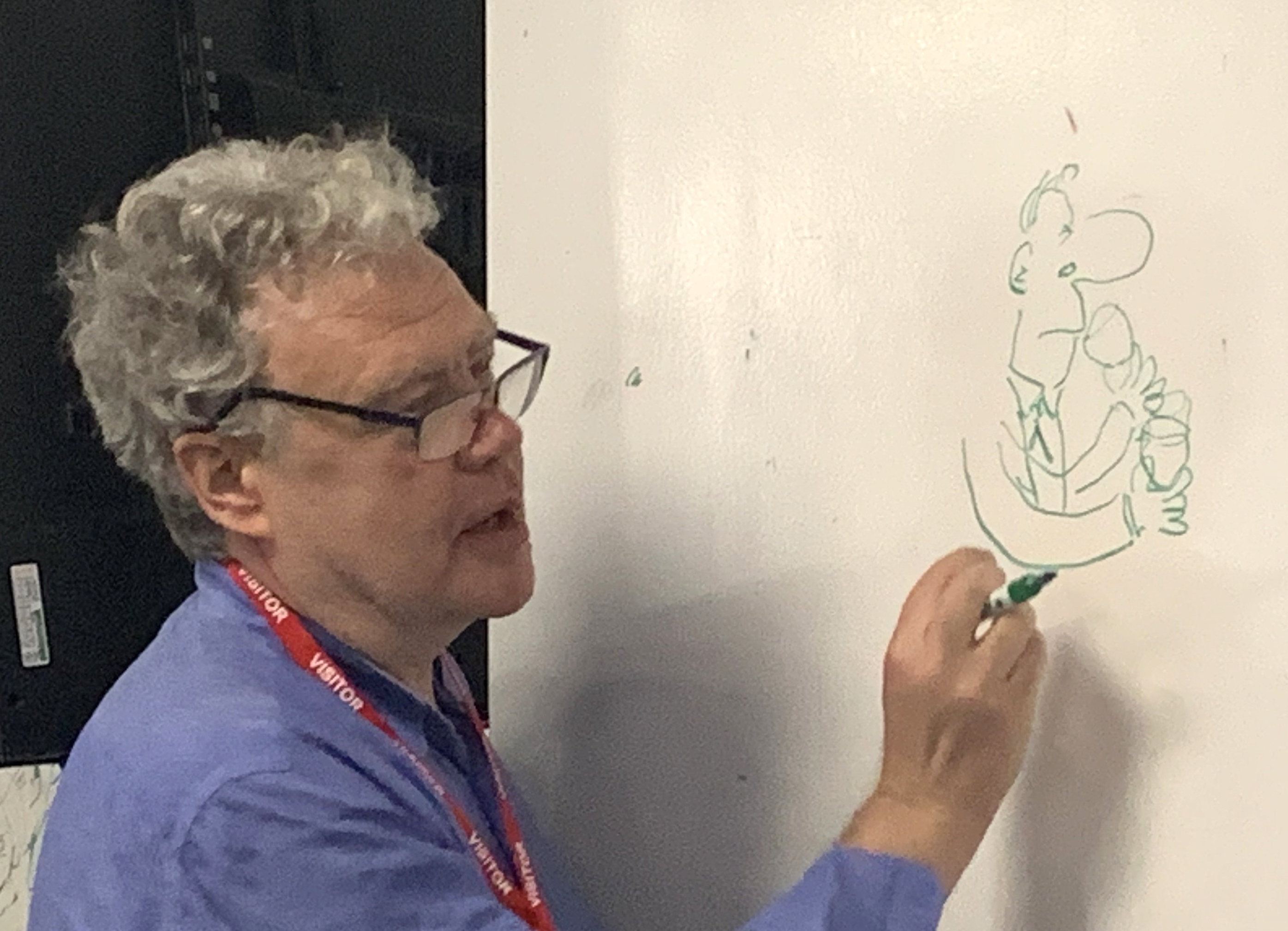
- Charles Peattie draws "Alex"
- Born: 4 April 1958 (age 68)
- Occupation: cartoonist
- Known for: Alex, Celeb
- Website: www.alexcartoon.com

Charles Peattie (born 3 April 1958) is a British cartoonist, best known as half of the team (with Russell Taylor) that creates the satirical comic strip Alex. He has two daughters and two sons, and lives in London. He was appointed MBE in the 2002 Honours List. He also draws the fortnightly cartoon strip Celeb in Private Eye.

== Education ==
Peattie studied at Saint Martin's School of Art.

== Career ==
He produced the cartoon 'Dick', which ran in Melody Maker, and the Celeb comic strip which has been running in Private Eye since 1987. Both were collaborations with Mark Warren.

=== Celeb ===
Celeb first appeared in Private Eye during May 1987. In that magazine, the strip is credited to "Ligger", a joint pseudonym for Peattie and Warren. Whilst several real people are named or caricatured, the eponymous "celebrity" is a fictional person, Gary Bloke. He has several character traits common with those of contemporary real-life celebrities.

Gary has a daughter named Pixie Frou-Frou, first mentioned in November 1987, when she was stated to be five years old. Her name was possibly inspired by that given by Bob Geldof and Paula Yates to their eldest daughter Fifi Trixibelle Geldof (born 1983); it is noteworthy that their third daughter (born 1990) was named Little Pixie Geldof.
