= Agatha Raisin and the Quiche of Death (film) =

- Genre: Comedy; Drama
- Based on: Agatha Raisin and the Quiche of Death by M. C. Beaton
- Written by: Stewart Harcourt
- Directed by: Geoffrey Sax
- Country of origin: United Kingdom
- Original language: English
- No. of episodes: 1

Production
- Producer: Matthew Mulot
- Running time: 2 hours
- Production companies: Mammoth Screen; Free@Last TV

Original release
- Network: Sky 1
- Release: 26 December 2014

Agatha Raisin and the Quiche of Death is British comedy-drama television film based on the 1992 novel of the same name by M. C. Beaton. The film aired on Sky1 on 26 December 2014. It served as a pilot to a full series entitled Agatha Raisin.

== Plot ==
Agatha Raisin, a public relations professional, gives up her life in London in the hope of starting a new life in the seemingly quiet village of Carsley, but soon finds herself a suspect in a murder case when she enters the village's annual quiche-making competition in an attempt to ingratiate herself with the community. She sets out to clear her name and solve the mystery of the quiche of death.

== Characters ==
Ashley Jensen stars as Agatha Raisin who has escaped to Carsley from London for a quieter life. Robert Bathurst joins the cast as Andy Cummings-Browne who has had his fair share of women from the village. Hermione Norris stars as his suffering wife Jo Cummings-Browne. Matt McCooey appears as a dedicated police officer DC Bill Wong.

== Cast ==
- Ashley Jensen as Agatha Raisin
- Hermione Norris as Jo Cummings Brown
- Robert Bathurst as Andy Cummings Brown
- Katy Wix as Gemma Simpson
- Mathew Horne as Roy Silver
- Jamie Glover as James Lacey
- Jason Barnett as DI Wilkes
- Matt McCooey as DC Bill Wong
- Caroline Langrishe as Sheila Barr
- Kobna Holdbrook-Smith as Jez
- Lucy Liemann as Sarah
- Carli Norris as Ella Cartwright
- John Lightbody as John Cartwright
- Sandy McDade as Gail
- Tim Stern as Gene
- Richard Durden as Mr Boggle
- Marcia Warren as Mrs Boggle
- Joseph Long as Spiros Eonomides
- Nichola McAuliffe as Maria Borrow
- John Mason as Steve
- Gavin Lee Lewis as Ian - Boyhood Band
- Nik Davies as Limousine driver
- Daniel Lander as Tug-of-War man
- Colin Murtagh as Paparazzi
- Alexander Gatherer as Employee

== Production ==
It was commissioned by Cameron Roach for Sky which announced on 22 August 2014 that it had commissioned for Sky1. Sky1's chief, Adam MacDonald, said, "Agatha Raisin And The Quiche Of Death is a contemporary, sharp and witty crime drama offering for the upcoming festive season." Agatha Raisin and the Quiche of Death began filming in September 2014. On her role in the film, Ashley Jensen said, "I am absolutely delighted to be on board! It's not often a part like this comes along for a woman. Agatha Raisin is a strong forthright, independent, driven, successful woman, who is both funny and flawed, a real woman of our time."
