= Nichola McAuliffe =

English actress and writer (b. 1955)

- Born: Nichola Teresa Mary McAuliffe; 27 August 1955 (age 71); Dulwich, London, England
- Education: LAMDA
- Occupations: Actress and writer
- Years active: 1979–present
- Spouse: Don MacKay (m. 1996; died 2017)

Nichola McAuliffe (born 27 August 1955) is an English television and stage actress and writer, best known for her role as Sheila Sabatini in the ITV hospital sitcom Surgical Spirit (1989–1995). She has also starred in several stage musicals and won the 1988 Olivier Award for Best Actress in a Musical for her role in Kiss Me, Kate.

== Acting career ==
McAuliffe was born in 1955 in Dulwich, London and trained at the London Academy of Music and Dramatic Art.

In 1984, she won the Clarence Derwent Award for her role as Queen Victoria in the West End production of Poppy at the Adelphi Theatre.

Between 1989 and 1995, McAuliffe starred as obstreperous surgeon Sheila Sabatini in the ITV sitcom Surgical Spirit, her most high-profile acting role to date. She also appeared in the long-running soap opera Coronation Street between 2001 and 2002. Other TV roles were in "The Sound of Drums", a Doctor Who episode screened on 23 June 2007, and in My Family as the judge in episode "Life Begins at Fifty".

In 1999, she played Jocasta, alongside Michael Sheen in the title role, in a Naxos Records audio recording of Sophocles' Oedipus the King.

McAuliffe has also had a number of stage roles, and was awarded the Laurence Olivier Theatre Award in 1988 (1987 season) for Best Actress in a Musical for Kiss Me, Kate.

She appeared as the evil Baroness Bomburst in the West End production of Chitty Chitty Bang Bang at the London Palladium, and was nominated for a 2003 Laurence Olivier Theatre Award for Best Performance in a Supporting Role or Musical of 2002 for her performance in the production.

In 2009, McAuliffe appeared as the Wicked Fairy at the Yvonne Arnaud Theatre, Guildford, in Sleeping Beauty, alongside Sarah-Jane Honeywell and Shane Lynch. In 2011, McAuliffe played Miss Shepherd in The Lady in the Van at Hull Truck Theatre.

In 2012, McAuliffe, a winner in 2001 for her performance in A Bed Among the Lentils, was again named Best Actress (the only person to win the nomination twice) in the Stage Awards for Acting Excellence at the Edinburgh Festival Fringe.

She subsequently wrote and appeared in a comic play, Maurice's Jubilee, staged at The Pleasance, which tells the story of an elderly man at the end of his life who is preparing to celebrate the Queen's Diamond Jubilee.

In film, McAuliffe provided the voice of James Bond's BMW in the 1997 film Tomorrow Never Dies. In 2009, she appeared in Chéri with Michelle Pfeiffer. She also appeared in the Radio 2 comedy series The News Huddlines.

In 2014, McAuliffe appeared as Maria Borrow in the Sky1 television film television film adaptation of the M. C. Beaton novel Agatha Raisin and the Quiche of Death.

In 2022, McAuliffe appeared as Black Eyed Mog in the BBC production of The English.

She played Brenda Collins, the mother of the recently deceased Debbie Colwell who had been in a coma, prior to being murdered by her husband Reiss Colwell (Jonny Freeman), in the BBC soap opera EastEnders in 2024.

== Writing ==
As well as writing several plays, McAuliffe has published two novels, The Crime Tsar, based loosely on Macbeth; and A Fanny Full of Soap, a comic novel about the pre-West End run of a stage musical, plus a children's story, Attila, Loolagax and the Eagle, both in 2003. She is also an occasional contributor to newspapers such as the Daily Mail. In 2015, her play Maurice's Jubilee was produced in the Moscow Art Theatre under the title The Jeweller's Jubilee and received good reviews.

== Personal life ==
McAuliffe married Don MacKay, a crime reporter for the Daily Mirror, in 1996. He died in 2017.

She is a patron of Saving Faces, the facial surgery research foundation; and of Action for Children's Arts, an organisation dedicated to the promotion of creative arts among children under 12.

== Filmography ==
=== Film ===
Year	Title	Role	Notes
1985	The Doctor and the Devils	Alice	
1997	Tomorrow Never Dies	Bond's BMW (voice)	
1998	Bedrooms and Hallways	Lady Homeowner 3	
1999	Plunkett & Macleane	Lady Crombie	
2009	Chéri	Madame Aldonza	
2017	Loose Ends	Carol	Short film
2022	Living	Mrs. Blake	
TBA	Maurice's Jubilee	Katy	Pre-production

=== Television ===
Year	Title	Role	Notes
1979	Tropic	Primrose	Episodes 1, 4 & 5
1980	Agony	Joyce (voice)	Series 2; Episode 3: "Coming Out... and Going in Again?"
1980	We, the Accused	Lily Worksop	Mini-series; Episodes 1 & 2
1980–1983	Pig in the Middle	Alice Boocock	Series 1–3; 15 episodes
1981	Fanny by Gaslight	Polly	Mini-series; Episode 3
1982	The Gentle Touch	Belia	Series 4; Episode 7: "The Meat Rack"
1985	Me and the Girls	Mavis Bennett	Television film
1987	Super Gran	Hatty the Hat Hatterley	Series 2; Episode 6: "Supergran and the State Visit"
1988	The Laurence Olivier Awards 1987	Lilli / Kate	Television Special (segment "Kiss Me Kate")
1989–1995	Surgical Spirit	Sheila Sabatini	Main role. Series 1–7; 50 episodes
1989	Storyboard	Carrie Vernon	Series 4; Episode 1: "Making News" (Pilot for the series "Making News")
1990	Making News	Carrie Vernon	Episodes 2, 5 & 6
1994	Cluedo	Herself	Series 4; Episode 6: "Publish & Be Damned"
2001	Skipper & Skeeto	Various characters	
2001	McCready and Daughter	Gina Nye	Episode 2: "The Dating Game"
2001	Randall & Hopkirk (Deceased)	Virginia Carpenter	Series 2; Episode 1: "Whatever Possessed You?"
2001–2002	Coronation Street	Anita Scott	13 episodes
2002	Spheriks	Additional Talent (voice)	
2005	Holby City	Patty Blackdale	Series 7; Episode 21: "Awakenings"
2007	My Family	Judge	Series 7; Episode 9: "Life Begins at Fifty"
2007	Doctor Who	Vivien Rook	Series 3; Episode 12: "The Sound of Drums"
2010	Doctors	Valerie Cheeseman	Series 12; Episode 80: "Naked Ambition"
2011	Extraordinary Women	Agatha Christie (voice)	
2014	Blandings	Drusilla	Series 2; Episode 4: "Lord Emsworth Acts for the Best"
2014	Agatha Raisin	Maria Borrow	Series 1; Episode: "The Quiche of Death"
2014	Doctors	Jane Richards	Series 16; Episode 60: "Pieces of String Too Short for Use"
2016	Doctors	Meredith Phelps	Series 17; Episode 173: "Right in Two"
2016	Victoria	Duchess of Cumberland	Series 1; Episodes 1–3: "Doll 123", "Ladies in Waiting" and "Brocket Hall"
2017	Graceless	Cormorant (voice)	Series 4; Episodes 1–4: "The Bomb", "The Room", "The Ward" and "The Dance"
2022	The Man Who Fell to Earth	Lorraine	Episode 1: "Hallo, Spaceboy"
2022	Doctor Who Unbound	Otia / Guide (voice)	Series 2; Episode 5: "Time Killers"
2022	The English	Black Eyed Mog	Mini-series; Episodes 3 & 5: "Vultures on the Line" and "The Buffalo Gun"
2023	Midsomer Murders	Norinda Bellamy	Series 23; Episode 4: "Dressed to Kill"
2024–2025	EastEnders	Brenda Collins	Recurring role
