= Hermione Norris =

British actress (born 1967)

- Born: 12 February 1967 (age 59); Paddington, London, England
- Occupation: Actress
- Years active: 1989–present
- Spouse: Simon Wheeler (m. 2002)
- Children: 2

Hermione Norris is an English actress. She attended the London Academy of Music and Dramatic Art in the 1980s, before taking small roles in theatre and on television. In 1996, she was cast in her breakout role of Karen Marsden in the comedy drama television series Cold Feet. She appeared in every episode of the series from 1998 to 2003 and was nominated for a British Comedy Award.

From 2002 to 2005, Norris co-starred in the crime drama series Wire in the Blood as Carol Jordan, and from 2005 to 2009 co-starred in the BBC One spy drama Spooks as Ros Myers. Her role in Spooks won her the award for Best Actress at the 2008 ITV3 Crime Thriller Awards, and another nomination the next year. From 2007 to 2009, she co-starred in the ITV comedy drama Kingdom. In 2020, she appeared in the Australian thriller series Between Two Worlds.

== Early life ==
Norris was born in Paddington, London, the second of four children. She has two sisters, a brother and two half-sisters. Her parents, businessman Michael and health visitor Helen Norris (née Latham), divorced when she was four years old. She moved with her mother and siblings to live with her grandmother in Derbyshire, but moved back to London a few years later. At age 12, she decided that she wanted to be a ballerina and won a scholarship at the Elmhurst School for Dance. While there, she took up drama at an after-school club, performing alongside her dance studies until she left aged 17.

At age 19, she enrolled at the London Academy of Music and Dramatic Art (LAMDA). On an exchange to the Moscow Art Theatre School, she played Nina in a production of The Seagull.

== Career ==
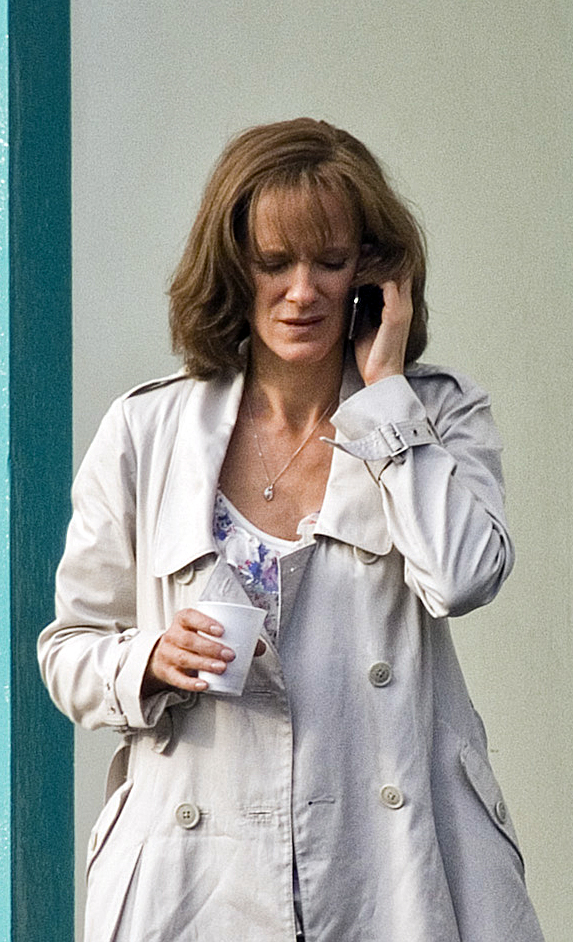
Norris on the set of Kingdom in 2008

Norris made her professional stage debut in a 1989 production of A Midsummer Night's Dream, which earned her her Equity card. She made her television debut in the 1991 BBC serial The Men's Room, playing the daughter of Bill Nighy's character. Other early television roles include appearances in Agatha Christie's Poirot, the television serial Clarissa, and a 1991 episode of Drop the Dead Donkey. She continued to make guest appearances in series such as Between the Lines and Casualty. In 1995 she played Helen in the Royal Exchange, Manchester's production of Look Back in Anger.

After being out of work for four months in 1996, Norris considered quitting acting and studying for a degree in law, intending to become a solicitor. However, she got a part in Cold Feet playing Karen Marsden, a middle-class woman who feels trapped by her middle-class lifestyle. Norris appeared in every episode and was nominated for a British Comedy Award for Best Actress in 2001.

During the six years Cold Feet ran, Norris appeared in a leading role in the BBC drama Berkeley Square, Killing Time: The Millennium Poem, starring opposite Christopher Eccleston, and the 2002 television film Falling Apart, playing a woman in a violent relationship. In 2002, she co-starred with Robson Green in Wire in the Blood, playing Detective Inspector Carol Jordan. She stayed with the series until 2005 when she was replaced by Simone Lahbib. Further film roles include an appearance in an adaptation of Kingsley Amis's Lucky Jim, and in David Kane's Born Romantic.

At the end of 2005 she was cast in the BBC One spy drama Spooks, playing Ros Myers. She appeared throughout the 2006 series, then in eight of the 10 episodes in the 2007 series before taking time off filming for maternity leave. She returned to the show for the 2008 series. For her part, she won the Best Actress award at the inaugural ITV3 Crime Thriller Awards. She was nominated in the same category the next year. She left the series in 2009 after four years.

From 2007 to 2009, she appeared in three series of Kingdom playing Beatrice Kingdom, the half-sister of Stephen Fry's character. She took the role as a change of pace from the "ice maiden" characters she often portrays. In 2010, she starred opposite Trevor Eve in the remake of Bouquet of Barbed Wire. In 2010, she was cast in the television science fiction drama Outcasts as Stella Isen, the head of security on an extraterrestrial human colony. Filming occurred on location in South Africa. From November 2010, Norris played Ruth Condomine in a national tour of Noël Coward's Blithe Spirit. She starred opposite her Cold Feet co-star Robert Bathurst, and Alison Steadman. She also starred in The Crimson Field, a British production about a field hospital in France in WW1.

On 4 October 2014, Norris guest-starred in episode 7 of the eighth series of the BBC's Doctor Who, 'Kill The Moon'. She played Lundvik, an astronaut.

Norris also starred as Jo in the Sky1 television film television film adaptation of the M. C. Beaton novel Agatha Raisin and the Quiche of Death.

Norris also starred in series five of Luther on BBC One in January 2019. Later that year, she was announced as the starring cast member of Seven Network's Between Two Worlds, created by Bevan Lee and directed by Kriv Stenders.

== Personal life ==
In 2002, Norris began a relationship with Simon Wheeler, a writer on Wire in the Blood. The couple married in December 2002 in a ceremony at the Tower of London. They have two children. Norris's father-in-law is General Sir Roger Wheeler, the Chief of the General Staff from 1997 to 2000.

== Acting credits ==
=== Film ===
Year	Title	Role	Notes
1999	Mad Cows	Petronella	
2001	Born Romantic	Carolanne	
2003	Quicksand	Sarah	Direct-to-video
2005	Separate Lies	Priscilla	
2017	Love of My Life	Tamara	
2024	The Salt Path	Polly	

=== Television ===
Year	Title	Role	Notes
1990	Blood Rights	Virginia	TV Mini-Series, 3 episodes
1991	The Men's Room	Joanna Carleton	TV Mini-Series, episode:1.4
1991	Drop the Dead Donkey	Octavia	Episode: "The Gulf Report"
1991	Casualty	Abby Larwood	Episode: "The Last Word"
1991	Clarissa	Anna Howe	TV Mini-Series, 4 episodes
1991–1992	Spatz	Wendy	2 episodes
1992	Screen Two	Caroline	TV series, Episode: “The Count if Solar”
1993	Agatha Christie's Poirot	Celestine	Episode: "Jewel Robbery at the Grand Metropolitan"
1993	Between the Lines	Gail Myles	Episode: "Manslaughter"
1994	Under the Hammer	Anthea Bovington	Episode: "The Spectre at the Feast"
1994	Casualty	Bobbie Croft	Episode: "The Facts of Life"
1997	Comedy Premieres: Cold Feet	Karen Marsden	Pilot
1997	See You Friday	Sophie	1 series
1997	Get Well Soon	Vanessa Del Ray	Episode: "The Whist Drive"
1997	Cadfael	Mary	Episode: "The Raven in the Foregate"
1997	Hospital!		Television film
1997	Agatha Christie's The Pale Horse	Hermia Redcliffe	Television film
1998	The Bill	Louise Golding	Episode: "Friends in High Places"
1998	Berkeley Square	Victoria St. John	1 series
1998–2003, 2016–2020	Cold Feet	Karen Marsden	9 series
1999	Peak Practice	Penny	Episode: "New Beginnings"
1999	Heartbeat	Diane Palmer	Episode: "David Stockwell's Ghost"
2000	Killing Time: The Millennium Poem	Millennium Woman	Television film
2002	Falling Apart	Clare	Television film
2002–2005	Wire in the Blood	DCI Carol Jordan	3 series
2003	Lucky Jim	Carol Goldsmith	Television film
2006	The Kindness of Strangers	Fiona Charters	Television film
2006–2009	Spooks	Ros Myers	4 series
2007–2009	Kingdom	Beatrice Kingdom	3 series
2010	Bouquet of Barbed Wire	Cassie Manson	Television serial
2011	Outcasts	Stella Isen	1 series
2012	A Mother's Son	Rosie	Television serial
2012	A Year in the Wild	Narrator	Documentary
2013	Agatha Christie's Marple	Evelyn Hillingdon	Episode: "A Caribbean Mystery"
2014	The Crimson Field	Grace Carter	TV series, 6 episodes
2014	In the Club	Roanna	2 series
2014	Doctor Who	Lundvik	Episode: "Kill the Moon"
2014	Agatha Raisin	Jo Cummings Browne	TV series, episode: “The Quiche of Death”
2018	Innocent	Alice Moffatt	TV Mini-Series, 4 episodes
2019	Luther	Dr Vivien Lake	Series 5
2020	Between Two Worlds	Cate Walford	
2022	Doc Martin	Sophie Trent	2 episodes
2022	Riches	Maureen Dawson	
2024	Silent Witness	CS Sheila Court	2 episodes
2025	DNA Journey	Herself	1 episode with Fay Ripley
2026	Death in Paradise	Margot Hartnell	Series 15, Episode 2
2026	Pilgrimage	Herself	3 episodes

=== Stage ===
Year	Title	Role	Notes
1989	A Midsummer Night's Dream	Helena	Mercury Theatre, Colchester
1989	Habeas Corpus	Felicity Rumpers	Mercury Theatre, Colchester
1989	Daisy Pulls it Off		Thorndike, Leatherhead
1991	Man and Superman	Ann Whitfield	Citizens Theatre
1991	Three Judgements in One	Dona Violante	Gate, Notting Hill
1992–1993	Pygmalion	Clara Eynsford-Hill	Olivier (National)
1992	Square Rounds	Various	Olivier (National)
1994	September Tide	Cherry	Tour (Islington, Leatherhead, Liverpool)
1994–1995	Charley's Aunt	Amy Spettigue	Royal Exchange, Manchester
1995	Look Back in Anger	Helena Charles	Royal Exchange, Manchester
1995	Reader	Irene / Jacqueline	Traverse Theatre
1996	Blinded by the Sun	Barbara	Cottesloe (National)
2005	Petronella	Petronella	Old Vic
2010–2011	Blithe Spirit	Ruth	Theatre Royal, Brighton; Cambridge Arts Theatre; Milton Keynes Theatre; Richmond Theatre; West End transfer Apollo Theatre
