= Agatha Raisin (TV series) =

British comedy-drama television program

- Genre: Cosy mystery; Comedy drama; Crime
- Based on: Agatha Raisin by M. C. Beaton
- Starring: Ashley Jensen; Jamie Glover; Jason Merrells; Mathew Horne; Lucy Liemann; Jason Barnett; Matt McCooey; Katy Wix; Jodie Tyack
- Composers: Rupert Gregson-Williams; Christopher Willis
- Country of origin: United Kingdom
- Original language: English
- No. of series: 4
- No. of episodes: 20

Production
- Executive producers: Barry Ryan; Michele Buck; David Walton; Kathleen Hutchison
- Producers: Matthew Mulot; Charlie Palmer (Series 4)
- Running time: 45–90 minutes
- Production companies: Free @ Last TV; Mammoth Screen (series 1); Company Pictures (series 2–4)

Original release
- Network: Sky One (series 1); Acorn TV (series 2–4)
- Release: 26 December 2014 – 20 February 2022

Agatha Raisin is a British comedy-drama television series, based on M. C. Beaton's book series of the same name about a former public relations agent who solves crime mysteries in the Cotswolds village of Carsley.

The programme was broadcast as a pilot titled Agatha Raisin and the Quiche of Death on 26 December 2014, followed by an eight-part series that first aired on Sky One on 7 June 2016. A second series was ordered by Acorn TV on 15 January 2018. On 27 February 2019, the show was commissioned for a third series. Later, it was renewed for a fourth series.

== Production ==
On 22 August 2014, Sky announced that it had commissioned the adaptation for Sky One. It was commissioned by Cameron Roach. Sky One chief Adam MacDonald said, "Agatha Raisin and the Quiche of Death is a contemporary, sharp, and witty crime drama offering for the upcoming festive season."

Agatha Raisin and the Quiche of Death began filming in September 2014. The main filming location was Biddestone, Wiltshire. On her role in the film, Ashley Jensen said, "I am absolutely delighted to be on board! It's not often a part like this comes along for a woman. Agatha Raisin is a strong forthright, independent, driven, successful woman, who is both funny and flawed, a real woman of our time."

Series two was ordered by Acorn TV, with a change to three 90-minute films as opposed to 45-minute episodes.

On 27 February 2019, the show was commissioned for series 3, which consists of four 90-minute episodes. It premiered on 28 October 2019. A fourth series started filming in March 2021.

== Cast and characters ==
=== Main ===
- Ashley Jensen as Agatha Raisin
  - Amybeth McNulty as young Agatha
- Jamie Glover as James Lacey: Agatha's on-again, off-again love interest
- Jason Merrells as Sir Charles Fraith: aristocratic friend of Agatha's who has a flirtation with her
- Mathew Horne as Roy Silver: former colleague of Agatha's from her Public Relations firm
- Lucy Liemann as Sarah Bloxby: wife of Reverend Jez Bloxby in series 1–3. As of series 4, she and Jez have broken up, and she is a parish curate.
- Jason Barnett as DCI Denzel Wilkes: a re-imagining of DCI Wilkes from the books, who has a contentious relationship with Agatha
- Matt McCooey as DC Bill Wong: the local police detective who is attracted to Gemma in series 1–2. From series 3 onwards, he is attracted to Toni and becomes her fiancé at the end of series 4.
- Katy Wix as Gemma Simpson (series 1–2): Agatha's friend, whom she relies on for assistance with cases at times; this character re-imagines Doris Simpson from the books
- Jodie Tyack as Toni Gilmour (series 3–4): hired detective at Agatha's Detective Agency with an eidetic memory. She is Gemma's cousin.

=== Recurring ===
- Marcia Warren as Mrs. Boggle: an older resident who often assists Agatha in solving crimes
- Caroline Langrishe as Sheila Barr (series 1, 3–4): sister of James Lacey
- Rhashan Stone as Jez Bloxby (portrayed by Kobna Holdbrook-Smith in the pilot): husband of Sarah in series 1–3. As of series 4, he and Sarah have broken up. This character re-imagines Alf Bloxby from the books.
- June Watson as Mrs. Josephs (series 1)
- Tim Stern as Gene Harvey (series 1)
- Richard Durden as Mr. Boggle (series 1)
- Maddie Monti as Kyra Simpson (series 1)
- Daisy Beaumont as Mary Fortune (series 1)
- Taz Skylar as Harry Beam (series 4): hired detective at Agatha's Detective Agency

== Episodes ==
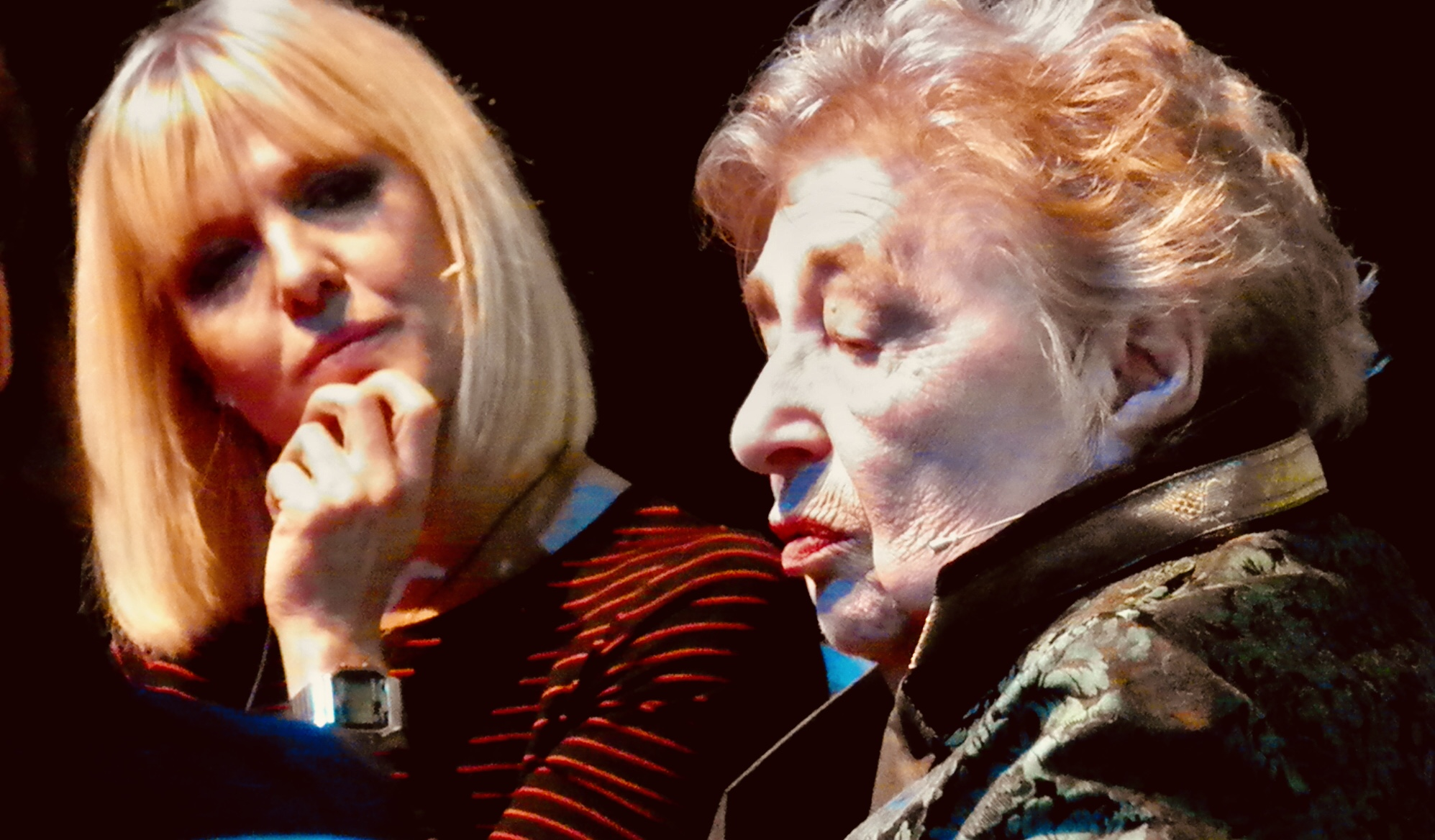
Ashley Jensen and Marion Chesney (M.C. Beaton) at Bloody Scotland Crime Writing Festival 2018

Series	Episodes	Originally released		
Series	Episodes	First released	Last released	Network
Pilot		26 December 2014		Sky One
1	8	7 June 2016	26 July 2016	Sky One
2	3	19 November 2018	28 January 2019	Acorn TV
3	4	28 October 2019	24 February 2020	Acorn TV
4	4	21 December 2021	20 February 2022	Acorn TV

=== Pilot (2014) ===
No. overall	No. in series	Title	Directed by	Written by	Original release date	UK viewers (millions)
—	—	"Agatha Raisin and the Quiche of Death"	Geoffrey Sax	Stewart Harcourt	26 December 2014	1.00
Agatha Raisin, a public relations professional, gives up her life in London in the hope of starting a new life in the seemingly quiet village of Carsley, but soon finds herself a suspect in a murder case when she enters the village's annual quiche-making competition in an attempt to ingratiate herself with the community. She sets out to clear her name and solve the mystery of the quiche of death.

=== Series 1 (2016) ===
No. overall	No. in series	Title	Directed by	Written by	Original release date	UK viewers (millions)
1	1	"Agatha Raisin and the Walkers of Dembley"	Geoffrey Sax	Chris Murray	7 June 2016	1.11
Jessica Tartinck, rambler and fervent activist, is found dead in a wheat field. Agatha Raisin is forced to go undercover in the village of Dembley to find out what happened.
2	2	"Agatha Raisin and Hell's Bells"	Geoffrey Sax	Stewart Harcourt	14 June 2016	0.93
Amanda Ballard is not a popular figure in the village of Carsely. When her body is found hanging on the bell ropes of the church, Agatha presumes she was murdered.
3	3	"Agatha Raisin and the Wellspring of Death"	Paul Harrison	Stewart Harcourt	21 June 2016	N/A
Robert Struthers, chairman of the parish council, is killed while the villagers of Ancombe quarrel over the sale of water rights.
4	4	"Agatha Raisin and the Potted Gardener"	Paul Harrison	Chris Murray	28 June 2016	1.04
Mary Fortune is found dead in her own back garden. She is a shining example of the perfect villager, so who could be behind this?
5	5	"Agatha Raisin and the Vicious Vet"	Roberto Bangura	Chris Murray	5 July 2016	0.98
Local vet and womanizer Paul Bladen is very popular with the ladies of Carsely. When he dies during routine surgery, Agatha has to find out the truth.
6	6	"Agatha Raisin and the Day the Floods Came"	Roberto Bangura	Chris Niel	12 July 2016	0.91
Young bride Kylie Stokes is found dead. Everything points to her drowning in a flood. But Agatha saw the bride being less than happy on her "happy day", and aims to solve the riddle herself.
7	7	"Agatha Raisin and the Witch of Wyckhadden"	Geoffrey Sax	Chris Murray	19 July 2016	0.84
Agatha has left Carsely and has taken shelter in the enormous Wyckhadden Hotel. She walks straight into another scandal when Francie Juddle, the local "witch", appears to have been killed.
8	8	"Agatha Raisin and Murderous Marriage"	Geoffrey Sax	Stewart Harcourt	26 July 2016	0.98
When her ex-husband Jimmy Raisin suddenly turns up in Carsely, Agatha's relationship with James Lacey is threatened. The police suspect Agatha is involved in Jimmy's murder.

=== Series 2 (2018–19) ===
No. overall	No. in series	Title	Directed by	Written by	Original release date	UK viewers (millions)
9	1	"Agatha Raisin and the Wizard of Evesham"	Roberto Bangura	Julia Gilbert	19 November 2018	0.78(Part1); 0.72(part2)
Agatha returns to Carsely and meets some new faces in the village. Some hostility arises in the local women's society. Agatha falls under the spell of Evesham "wizard" hairdresser Jonny Shawpart. However, the spell is quickly broken when Agatha finds herself dealing with a blackmail and a murder case.
10	2	"Agatha Raisin and the Fairies of Fryfam"	Matt Carter	Chris Murray	24 December 2018	0.61(part 1); 0.51(part 2)
In need of a change of scenery, Agatha temporarily relocates to Fryfam. She plans to do some writing, but it doesn't take long for a distraction to pop up. In the local pub she meets a woman who wants her help to find out whether her husband is having an affair. When a murder occurs, Agatha suddenly finds herself a suspect in the inquiry that follows. Luckily, her friends come to the rescue!
11	3	"Agatha Raisin and the Curious Curate"	Audrey Cooke	Chris Niel	28 January 2019	0.55(part 1); 0.54(part 2)
With reverend Bloxby away on the missions, a fetching new curate is appointed to Carsely. When he is murdered, one of Agatha's closest friends falls under suspicion. With the help of Charles, Agatha tries to clear her friend's name. Meanwhile, the local police are none too happy with this interference. With James Lacey back in Carsely, Agatha finds herself majorly distracted from her investigations.

=== Series 3 (2019–20) ===
No. overall	No. in series	Title	Directed by	Written by	Original release date	UK viewers (millions)
12	1	"Agatha Raisin and the Haunted House"	Carolina Giammetta	Julia Gilbert	28 October 2019	<0.21
Agatha has started her own private detective agency, but business is slow. When she learns the owner of a haunted house is terrified for her life due to a recent increase in paranormal activity, Agatha decides to stick her nose in, hoping to solve an easy case and get her agency firmly established.
13	2	"Agatha Raisin and the Deadly Dance"	Roberto Bangura	Chris Murray	10 February 2020	<0.184
When the soon-to-be-engaged daughter of Sir Charles' old friend receives a death threat, Agatha is hired to protect the intended victim. Agatha soon realizes the situation is not what it seems to be ...and that she herself is a target!
14	3	"Agatha Raisin and the Love from Hell"	Audrey Cooke	Chris Niel	17 February 2020	<0.232
Having been away on a promotional tour for his new book, James returns to Carsely accompanied by the attractive Melissa. At a charity event, Agatha and James have a row which ends with James and Melissa storming out. Next day, Melissa is found murdered, while James is missing. Agatha must now team up with James' sister Sheila to find James and clear him of suspicion.
15	4	"As the Pig Turns"	Matt Carter	Chris Murray	24 February 2020	<0.195
Shortly before a pig is to be roasted at Winter Parva's fair, Agatha discovers the supposed pig contains a human torso. Bill and Agatha each start their own investigation into the case. Meanwhile, equipment is mysteriously vanishing from local farms, Toni and Bill are struggling with their potential relationship, and Charles must defend himself from Agatha's accusation that he is trying to seduce Sarah Bloxby.

=== Series 4 (2021–22) ===
No. overall	No. in series	Title	Directed by	Written by	Original release date	UK viewers (millions)
16	1	"Kissing Christmas Goodbye"	Matt Carter	Julia Gilbert	19 December 2021	no data
The wealthy Phyllis Tamworthy plans to give her entire estate, including the local village, to a charitable foundation. Fearing the reactions from Satanist villagers and her disinherited children, she hires Agatha to protect her. Meanwhile, Roy is attempting to organize Agatha's Christmas.
17	2	"Love, Lies & Liquor"	James Larkin	Matt Thomas	6 February 2022	no data
James has invited Agatha to stay with him at a hotel, supposedly so she can do PR work for his new book. Their stay is quickly spoiled; first by protesters and the odious Jankers family... and then by a murder for which Agatha is the prime suspect.
18	3	"Spoonful of Poison"	Roberto Bangura	Chris Niel	13 February 2022	no data
The competition to be crowned winner of the Carsely Jam-Off has always been fierce, but when the prize jam is poisoned, leading to the death of a judge, things may finally have gone a step too far. Determined to bring the killer to justice, Agatha resolves to restore the competition's name.
19	4	"There Goes the Bride"	Audrey Cooke	Chris Murray & Maria Ward	20 February 2022	no data
Agatha reluctantly promises to support James by attending his wedding. However, when a body is found during the morning of the big day, it's up to Agatha and the gang to come to the rescue.

== Agathaland ==
Sky Max broadcast an hour-long documentary on the creation of the series on 7 May 2023.

== Reception ==
Reviewing the first series, The Independent was critical of the writing, but praised Jensen. On the other hand, The New York Times called the series "delightful". The Guardian described the second series as "Campy, kitsch, silly and very fun". TV Scoop said about the show "It's a sexy show with loads of plot twists. You follow Agatha's journey figuring out whodunnit in a comical way."

== Home media ==
Region 1: Acorn Media- Agatha Raisin, Series 1 DVD was released on 25 October 2016. Agatha Raisin, Series 2 DVD and Blu-ray were released on 7 May 2019. Agatha Raisin, Series 3 DVD was released on 26 May 2020.

Region 2: In the UK, Acorn released Series 1 on DVD on 1 August 2016. Series 2 DVD was released on 29 July 2019.

Region 4: The first four seasons have been released in Australia.

	Region 1	Region 2	Region 4
Season 1	25 October 2016	1 August 2016	2 November 2016
Season 2	7 May 2019	29 July 2019	20 March 2019
Seasons 1 & 2	N/A	N/A	6 November 2019
Season 3	26 May 2020	6 July 2020	1 April 2020
Seasons 1–3	N/A	6 July 2020	2 December 2020
Season 4	31 May 2022	6 June 2022	3 August 2022
Seasons 1–4	N/A	6 June 2022	N/A
