= Caroline Langrishe =

English actress (born 1958)

- Born: 10 January 1958 (age 68); Marylebone, London, England
- Occupation: Actress
- Years active: 1976–present
- Spouse: Patrick Drury (m. 1984; div. 1995)
- Children: 2

Caroline Langrishe (born 10 January 1958) is an English actress.

== Early life ==
Born in Marylebone, London, Langrishe is the elder daughter of Patrick Nicholas Langrishe TD (1932–2022), of The Manor House, Sellindge, Kent, a lieutenant in the 11th Hussars, later Major in the Leicestershire and Derbyshire Yeomanry, and his wife Penelope Jill, daughter of Royal Navy Lieutenant-Commander Kenneth Horley. Her grandfather, Sir Terence Langrishe (1895–1973) was an Irish baronet.

In 1964, Langrishe moved with her parents and sister to Kent, where she grew up. She trained at the Elmhurst Ballet School, but after deciding that she could not become a soloist for the Royal Ballet, moved into acting.

== Career ==
In 1976, Langrishe made her acting debut when she appeared in the BBC production of The Glittering Prizes. The next year, she played the role of Kitty in the BBC1 adaptation of Anna Karenina, before working in the theatre with Peter Gill. Among her roles was Anya in Gill's 1978 production of The Cherry Orchard Her first big part was in the 1978 British adaptation of Les Misérables. That same year, she made her big-screen debut, playing the part of Loretta, the receptionist to Robert Morley's character in Who Is Killing the Great Chefs of Europe?

She also starred as Jane Winters in the futuristic BBC Play for Today episode The Flipside of Dominick Hide (1980) and its sequel, Another Flip for Dominick (1982) both by Jeremy Paul and Alan Gibson. She played Janet Holywell, the wife of Fred Holywell, in a film adaptation of Charles Dickens's A Christmas Carol (1984), starring George C. Scott. She also appeared in one episode of Minder broadcast in 1984, as Julie, a journalist. Onstage, she played in Kenneth Branagh's production of Twelfth Night. She became a leading actress, taking the lead in the BBC detective series Pulaski (1987) and appearing in several episodes of Chancer (1990).

Langrishe is perhaps best known for her role as Charlotte Cavendish in the BBC series Lovejoy in which she appeared for two series in 1993–1994. After appearing in some episodes of The Good Sex Guide in the mid-1990s, she appeared in Sharpe's Regiment (1996) and Sharpe's Justice (1997) as the Dowager Countess Anne Camoynes. She played the unhappy landlady to Hywel Bennett's James Shelley in the seventh series of Shelley on ITV. She has also appeared in Heartbeat, in the episode Echoes of the Past that aired in December 1998. In 1999 she starred in Brotherly Love. From 2001 to 2007, she appeared as regular character Georgina Channing, Donald Sinden's daughter, alongside Martin Shaw in the BBC TV drama Judge John Deed, playing his ex-wife and then joined the BBC medical drama Casualty, playing executive director Marilyn Fox.

In 2010, she played Ros, an "older woman" in an open marriage, in Pete versus Life on Channel 4. In September 2010, she played the character of Susan Fincher in an episode of Midsomer Murders titled "Blood on the Saddle". In late December 2011, she appeared in teen soap opera Hollyoaks as Barney Harper-McBride's mother. In December 2014, she appeared as Sheila in the Sky1 television film adaptation of the M. C. Beaton novel Agatha Raisin and the Quiche of Death.

== Personal life ==
Langrishe married the actor Patrick Drury in London on 15 November 1984, but the couple divorced in 1995 after having two daughters. She currently lives in Putney. Her hobbies include tennis, rowing, running and swimming.

== Filmography ==
=== Film ===
Year	Film	Role	Notes
1978	Who Is Killing the Great Chefs of Europe?	Loretta	
1979	Eagle's Wing	Judith	
1980	Death Watch	Girl in the Bar	
1984	A Christmas Carol	Janet Holywell	
1988	Hawks	Carol	
1996	Crimetime	Jenny Lamb	
1998	Parting Shots	Vanessa	
1999	Rogue Trader	Ash Lewis	
2005	Kisna: The Warrior Poet	Jennifer Beckett	
2011	Love's Kitchen	Liz	
2012	A Second Son	Lorraine Turner	
2014	Bonobo	Margarita Goethe	
2019	Messalina's Offer	Margarita Goethe	
2020	Tremors: Shrieker Island	Jas	
TBA	Aleeza and Harriet	Harriet	Short, post-production

=== Television ===
Year	Film	Role	Notes
1976	The Glittering Prizes	Felicity	Episode: "A Love Life"
1976	The Brothers	Lynn	Episode: "Invitations"
1976	Victorian Scandals	Hypatia Bradlaugh	Episode: "The Fruits of Philosophy"
1977	Just William	Dolly Clovis	Episode: "The Outlaws and the Tramp"
1977	Romance	Lucinda	Episode: "Emily"
1977	Anna Karenina	Kitty	TV miniseries, 9 episodes
1978	Wuthering Heights	Isabella Linton	TV miniseries, 3 episodes
1978	Les Misérables	Cosette	TV film
1979, 1980, 1982	Play for Today	Jill, Jane	3 episodes, including The Flipside of Dominick Hide
1980	Hammer House of Horror	Tina	Episode: "Guardian of the Abyss"
1981	Seconds Out	Lewa Brenson	Episode: "Round 4"
1981	Tales of the Unexpected	Ellen	Episode: "Shatterproof"
1982	Q.E.D.	Jenny Martin	TV miniseries
1983	Number 10	Eleanor Eden	Episode: "Bloodline"
1984	Sharing Time	Kelly	Episode: "Time Trial"
1984	Minder	Julie Waters	Episode: "The Balance of Power"
1984	A Christmas Carol	Janet Holywell	TV film
1986	Dead Man's Folly	Sally Legge	TV film
1986	Love and Marriage	Lucy	Episode: "Let's Run Away to Africa"
1987	Fortunes of War	Bella Niculesco	3 episodes
1987	Pulaski	Kate Smith / Briggsy	Main role
1988	Twelfth Night	Olivia	TV film
1988–1989	Shelley	Carol	Recurring role (series 1–2)
1989	Boon	Charlotte 'Charlie' Hannigan	Episode: "The Not So Lone Ranger"
1990	Chancer	Penny Nichols	Main role (series 1), 13 episodes
1990	The Bill	Perditia Flaxton-Green	Episode: "A Case to Answer"
1991	Agatha Christie's Poirot	Marguerite Clayton	Episode: "The Mystery of the Spanish Chest"
1991	Trainer	Alison Taylor	Episode: "A Little Touch of Magic in the Night"
1993	Cluedo	Candice Costello	Episode: "The Word, the Flesh and the Devil"
1993	An Exchange of Fire	Dr. Sheila Stevens	2 episodes
1993, 1998	Peak Practice	Susan Lees, Anna Bradshaw	Episodes: "Hope to Die", "Glass Houses"
1993–1994	Lovejoy	Charlotte Cavendish	Main role (series 5–6), 22 episodes
1996-1997	Sharpe	Anne Camoynes	Episodes: Sharpe's Regiment and Sharpe's Justice
1997	Embassy	Belinda Thompson	TV film
1997	Bombay Blue	Jane Ballinger	Episode: "1.3"
1998	Mosley	Jane Bewley	Episode: "Rule of the Game"
1998	Heartbeat	Jane Hayes	Episode: "Echoes of the Past"
1999	Taggart	Helen Drummond	Episode: "A Fistful of Chips"
1999	Cleopatra	Calpurnia	TV miniseries
1999	Brotherly Love	Kate Cameron	Main role
2000	Justice in Wonderland	Miss Bozek	TV film
2000	Newborn	Kathryn Reed	TV film
2001–2007	Judge John Deed	Georgina Channing	Regular role
2002	As If	Vyvian Sutton	Episodes: "Jamie's POV", "Nikki's POV"
2004	The Afternoon Play	Anna Sullivan	Episode: "Sons, Daughters and Lovers"
2005	Egypt	Lady Carnarvon	TV miniseries
2006	Tripping Over	Sarah	2 episodes
2007–2008	Casualty	Marilyn Fox	Recurring role (series 22–23)
2010	Doctors	Judith Leicester	Recurring role
2010	Pete versus Life	Ros	Episode: "Older Woman"
2010, 2017	Midsomer Murders	Susan Fincher, Janey Rafferty	2 episodes
2011	Outnumbered	Jenny	Episode: "The Parents' Evening"
2011	The Case	Saskia Stanley	TV miniseries
2011	Hollyoaks	Judith Harper-McBride	2 episodes
2013	Death in Paradise	Laura Masters	Episode: "An Unholy Death"
2014, 2020, 2021	Agatha Raisin	Sheila Barr	3 episodes
