= Geoffrey Sax =

British film and television director

- Born: 17 October 1949 (age 76)
- Other name: Geoff Sax
- Occupation: Film director

Geoffrey Sax (sometimes credited as Geoff Sax) is a British film and television director, who has worked on a variety of drama productions in both the United Kingdom and the United States.

== Life and career ==
He began his directing career in the late 1970s, initially working in comedy, directing episodes of a number of sketch shows such as Cannon and Ball and End of Part One. He made the move into directing drama in the early 1980s, working on episodes of BBC dramas such as Bergerac and Lovejoy.

Later in the decade he worked on ITV programmes such as Spitting Image and The New Statesman. In the early 1990s he worked for a time in America, directing television films and miniseries for various networks there. His most noted production during this time was the BBC / Universal Studios / Fox Network TV movie version of the science-fiction series Doctor Who, screened in 1996 and starring Paul McGann as the Doctor.

In 1998 Sax returned to the UK. He directed Lynda La Plante's adaptation of her own novel Killer Net that year, and later gained credits on Paul Abbott's acclaimed Clocking Off, a Red Production Company series for BBC One.

In 2001 he directed a modern-day adaptation of the story of Othello, produced by London Weekend Television for the ITV network and starring Eamonn Walker, Christopher Eccleston and Keeley Hawes. The adaptation was written by Andrew Davies, who Sax worked with again the following year when he directed Davies' adaptation of Sarah Waters' novel Tipping the Velvet for Sally Head Productions and BBC Two. This was not the only connection between the two productions: Tipping the Velvet also starred Rachael Stirling, who had a smaller role in Othello.

Sax's first theatrically released feature film, White Noise, was released in January 2005, entering the US Box Office top ten at No. 2. His second feature, Stormbreaker — based on Anthony Horowitz's Alex Rider novel of the same name — was released in the summer of 2006. He also directed the film Frankie & Alice in 2010.

In 2011, Sax directed a television film entitled Christopher and His Kind.

He directed the Sky1 television film adaptation of the M. C. Beaton novel Agatha Raisin and the Quiche of Death.

== Filmography ==
=== Films ===
- The Disputation (1986)
- Circle of Deceit (1993)
- Doctor Who (1996)
- Othello (2001)
- Margery & Gladys (2003)
- White Noise (2005)
- Stormbreaker (2006)
- Frankie & Alice (2010)
- Christopher and His Kind (2011)

=== Television ===
- Canned Laughter (1979)
- End of Part One (1979–1980)
- Spitting Image (1986)
- The New Statesman (1987–1990)
- Bergerac (1988–1990)
- Sleepers (1991)
- Framed (1992)
- Lovejoy (1992–1993)
- Killer Net (1998)
- Tipping the Velvet (2002)
- Murder on the Home Front (2013)
- Blandings (2014)
- Endeavour (2014, 2018)
- Agatha Raisin and the Quiche of Death (2014)
- Us (2020)
