= Hamish Macbeth =

Fictional Scottish character

- First appearance: Death of a Gossip
- Created by: M. C. Beaton
- Portrayed by: Robert Carlyle

In-universe information
- Gender: Male
- Occupation: Police officer
- Nationality: Scottish

Hamish Macbeth is the police constable of the fictional Scottish Highland town of Lochdubh, in a series of murder mystery novels created by M. C. Beaton (Marion Chesney).

Considered by many to be a useless, lazy moocher, Macbeth is very well informed about his community's activities and often overlooks minor transgressions in the interests of the public weal. In time, it emerges that, following Highland tradition as the eldest child, he remains single because he is supporting his crofter parents and six much younger siblings by sending them most of his salary, and finding various ways to supplement his income. Having created a niche for himself in the community and on the police force, he uses his intelligence and skills to solve murder cases – while evading all efforts to transfer, promote, and/or fire him out of it.

There were 33 novels, one novella, and one short story published in the UK by Constable & Robinson before the author's death in 2019. A subsequent short story and several novels, begun as collaborative works with the original author and finished after her death by R. W. Green, were published starting in 2022.

== Character ==
Hamish Macbeth is the eldest of seven siblings and has three brothers and three sisters. His parents are crofters and, as the eldest son, Hamish is expected to contribute to his family's income. He lives in Lochdubh's police station and keeps some sheep and chickens and grows some vegetables. He is occasionally guilty of poaching a salmon, sometimes for himself, but often as a gift or bribe for others.

Hamish has a reputation for laziness. He loves the town of Lochdubh (meaning 'black lake' (loch) in Gaelic and pronounced Lokh-DOO) and is content and at peace with his life despite his lack of ambition. Of great concern to Hamish and his fellow villagers is the threat of possible closure of Lochdubh's police station, something his superior and archenemy, Chief Inspector Blair, would like to see. Hamish avoids promotion, occasionally even deliberately destroying attempts to give him recognition for his accomplishments. His position as "local bobby" sees him sometimes left out of official investigations and he must often work outside official channels, as the detectives from neighbouring Strathbane CID do not appreciate his help. Despite this, it is Hamish's natural "Highland curiosity" and local knowledge and intuition that combine to solve crimes.

Early in the series, Hamish has an on-again, off-again romance with Priscilla Halburton-Smythe, the daughter of a wealthy local landowner. The romance ultimately ends in a broken engagement because of her sexual coldness; thereafter, his luck with women, including Elspeth Grant, a reporter with whom he has a relationship, continues to be poor. Hamish is very attached to his pets, first his dog Towser, then in later books his dog Lugs (Scots for "ears") and a "domesticated" wildcat named Sonsie (Scots for "cheeky").

Hamish is tall and thin. He has hazel eyes and long eyelashes and fiery red hair.

== Setting ==
The fictional village of Lochdubh is set in the real county of Sutherland. Although Lochdubh and the neighbouring town of Strathbane are fictional places, the series refers to real Scottish towns such as Dornoch, Dingwall, and Inverness.

In an interview, the author recalls,

"I was at a fishing school in Sutherland in the very north of Scotland, and I thought, what a wonderful setting for a classical detective story, 11 people isolated in this Highland wilderness. So Hamish Macbeth was born."

== Recurrent characters ==
=== In Lochdubh ===
- Hamish Macbeth – Lochdubh's village policeman.
- Priscilla Halburton-Smythe – once the love of his life, the beautiful, cool Priscilla still tugs at his heartstrings and has assisted Hamish in solving crimes.
- Colonel George Halburton-Smythe – Priscilla's snobbish father. He dislikes Hamish immensely and considers him a most unsuitable friend for his daughter.
- Mary Halburton-Smythe – Priscilla's timid mother.
- Elspeth Grant – local news reporter and sometime love interest of Hamish. Her gypsy heritage gives her insights into her surroundings that Hamish comes to trust.
- Dr. Brodie – the village doctor, who enjoys hearty cholesterol-laden meals.
- Angela Brodie – the doctor's wife. Motherly, but not very domestic and a poor cook. Dotes on her cats. Author of a detective novel. A good friend and sounding board.
- Nessie & Jessie Currie – twin sisters and village gossips.
- Archie Maclean – a fisherman who spends his time when not at sea at the harbour front or in the local pub to avoid his wife.
- Mrs. Maclean – Archie's overly houseproud wife, with a penchant for boiling laundry.
- Mrs. Wellington – the local clergyman's wife. She has a loud, booming voice and is at the heart of Lochdubh's village life.
- Rev. Wellington – a man with strong Christian values who is kindly and tolerant.
- Angus Macdonald – an old man with the reputation of being a seer, but Hamish believes that he is a fraud with a network of gossipy contacts.
- Willie Lamont – Hamish's former subordinate, Willie leaves the police force to marry Lucia, a relative of the local Italian restaurant owner, to devote himself to the restaurant.
- Lucia Lamont – Willie Lamont's beautiful Italian wife.
- Mr. Patel – an Indian immigrant who operates a local grocery shop in Lochdubh.

=== Police in Strathbane ===
- Superintendent Peter Daviot – head of Strathbane police force
- Susan Daviot – Daviot's social-climbing wife, who aspires to befriend Priscilla Halburton-Smythe
- Helen – Daviot's secretary, who hates Hamish
- Detective Chief Inspector Blair – who hates Hamish (mostly because Hamish is competent and Blair is not); a fat whisky drinker who, on several occasions, is hospitalised with alcohol poisoning.
- Detective Inspector Jimmy Anderson – Blair's second-in-command who regularly gives Hamish information in exchange for a wee dram, unless Blair is ill, or Anderson seeks promotion
- Detective Sergeant Andy McNab – Blair's assistant
- Dr. Forsyth – a forensic pathologist

== Novels ==
1. Death of a Gossip (1985)
2. Death of a Cad (1987)
3. Death of an Outsider (1988)
4. Death of a Perfect Wife (1989)
5. Death of a Hussy (1990)
6. Death of a Snob (1992)
7. Death of a Prankster (1992)
8. Death of a Glutton (1993), also published under the title Death of a Greedy Woman
9. Death of a Travelling Man (1993)
10. Death of a Charming Man (1994)
11. Death of a Nag (1995)
12. Death of a Macho Man (1996)
13. Death of a Dentist (1997)
14. Death of a Scriptwriter (1998)
15. Death of an Addict (1999)
16. Death of a Dustman (2001)
17. Death of a Celebrity (2002)
18. Death of a Village (2003)
19. Death of a Poison Pen (2004)
20. Death of a Bore (2005)
21. Death of a Dreamer (2006)
22. Death of a Maid (2007)
23. Death of a Gentle Lady (2008)
24. Death of a Witch (2009)
25. Death of a Valentine (2010)
26. Death of a Chimney Sweep (2011), also published under the title Death of a Sweep
27. Death of a Kingfisher (2012)
28. Death of Yesterday (2013)
29. Death of a Liar (2013)
30. Death of a Policeman (2014)
31. Death of a Nurse (2016)
32. Death of a Ghost (2017)
33. Death of an Honest Man (2018)
34. Death of a Green-Eyed Monster (2022), also published under the title Death of a Love
35. Death of a Traitor (2023)
36. Death of a Spy (2024)
37. Death of a Smuggler (2025)

== Shorter works ==
1. A Highland Christmas (1999, novella)
2. Knock, Knock, You're Dead (2016, short story)
3. Death of a Laird (2022, short story)

== Adaptations ==
=== Television ===
The Hamish Macbeth books were adapted into the BBC Scotland television series Hamish Macbeth. Running for three series between 1995 and 1997, the titular police officer was played by Robert Carlyle. The first and second series comprised six episodes and the third had an additional two-part series finale to make eight episodes. The series bore little relation to the content of Beaton's novels. Macbeth and Lochdubh were retained, in name at least, but little else survived – notably, none of the supporting characters were carried over.

The author was not happy with the TV series. "It wasn't like the books, I wrote about a six-foot laid-back highlander and I got a 5ft 8" Glaswegian with a chip on his shoulder," Beaton says. "It was an unfortunate experience."

The TV adaptations took several liberties with the plots – when they used the plots from the books at all. Some episodes combined elements from several novels into each episode, changing the details enough to make them work together. In general, the TV series had a very different focus and flavour from the book series, featuring a somewhat darker tone and hints of magical realism.

While Beaton was not happy with the changes, the TV series developed a loyal fan base, and many viewers have since come to know the Hamish Macbeth that Beaton originally created. Her earlier novels are being reprinted and re-released to fill the gaps between new volumes.

Beaton has often been left out of plans for her own creations. "They wanted to do a making of Hamish Macbeth without even mentioning me at all," Beaton joked. "However, it does lead to ideas to killing people."

In 2016, another Beaton creation, Agatha Raisin, also became a TV series.
