= Agatha Raisin and the Potted Gardener =

1994 novel by Marion Chesney

The Potted Gardener
- First edition
- Author: M. C. Beaton (Marion Chesney)
- Language: English
- Series: Agatha Raisin
- Genre: Detective, Mystery novel
- Publisher: Minotaur Books
- Publication date: 1994
- Publication place: United Kingdom
- Media type: Print (paperback)
- Pages: 256 (paperback)
- ISBN: 9781849011365

The Potted Gardener is the third Agatha Raisin mystery novel by Marion Chesney under her pseudonym M. C. Beaton.

== Plot ==
Agatha Raisin comes home to Carsely after a long vacation in New York, Bermuda, Montreal, Paris, Greece, Italy & Turkey, and finds that a new woman has piqued the interest of her bachelor neighbor, James Lacey. Agatha is less than thrilled. The newcomer to the Cotswolds, Mary Fortune, is superior, especially when it comes to gardening, and Mary is very involved in the Horticultural Society. If only a murder would come along to remind James of Agatha’s investigation skills. There are a series of mysterious assaults on the town’s finest gardens, followed by a murder.
