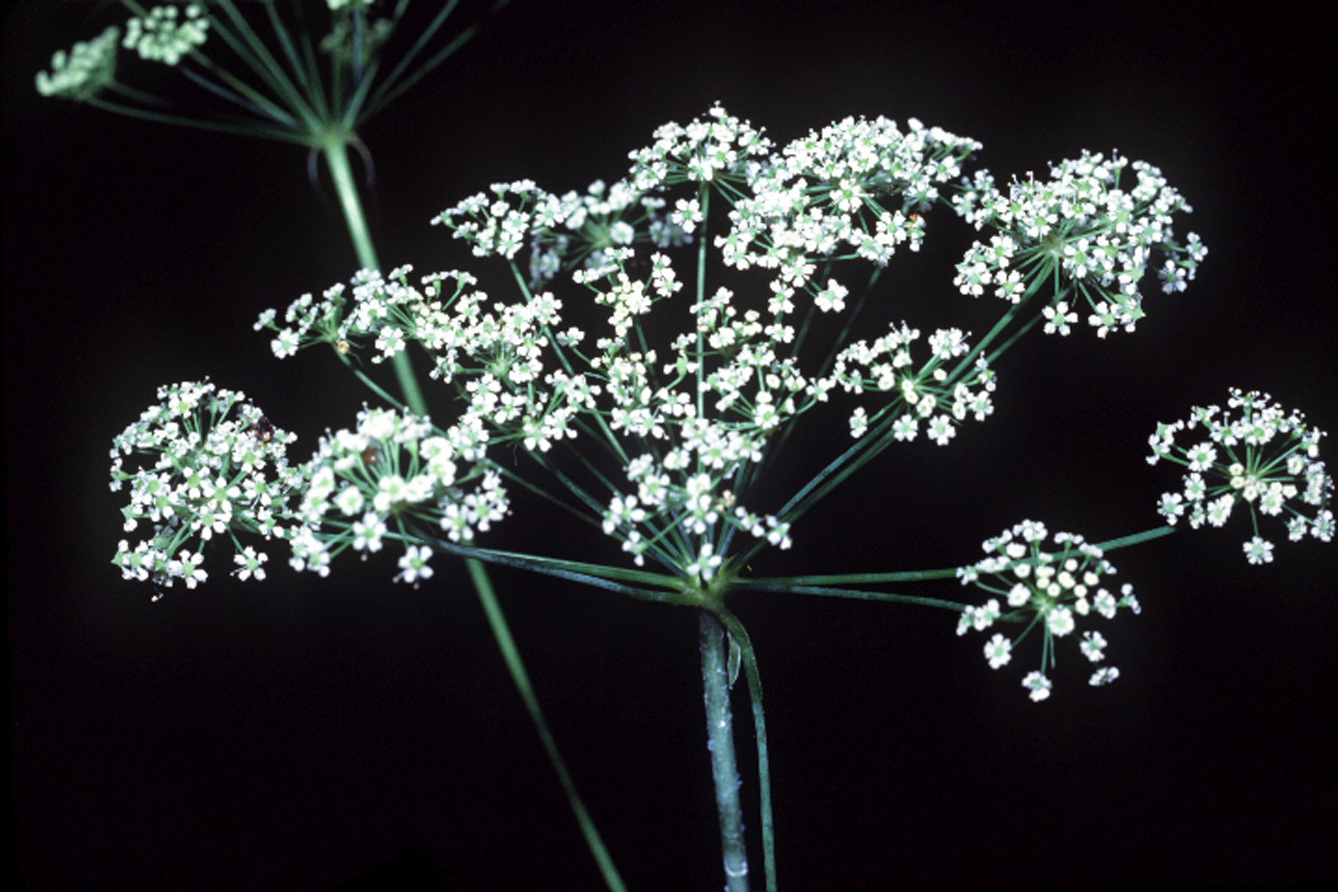

Scientific classification
- Kingdom: Plantae
- Clade: Tracheophytes
- Clade: Angiosperms
- Clade: Eudicots
- Clade: Asterids
- Order: Apiales
- Family: Apiaceae
- Genus: Oxypolis
- Species: O. rigidior

Binomial name
- Oxypolis rigidior (L.) Raf.

= Oxypolis rigidior =

Species of flowering plant

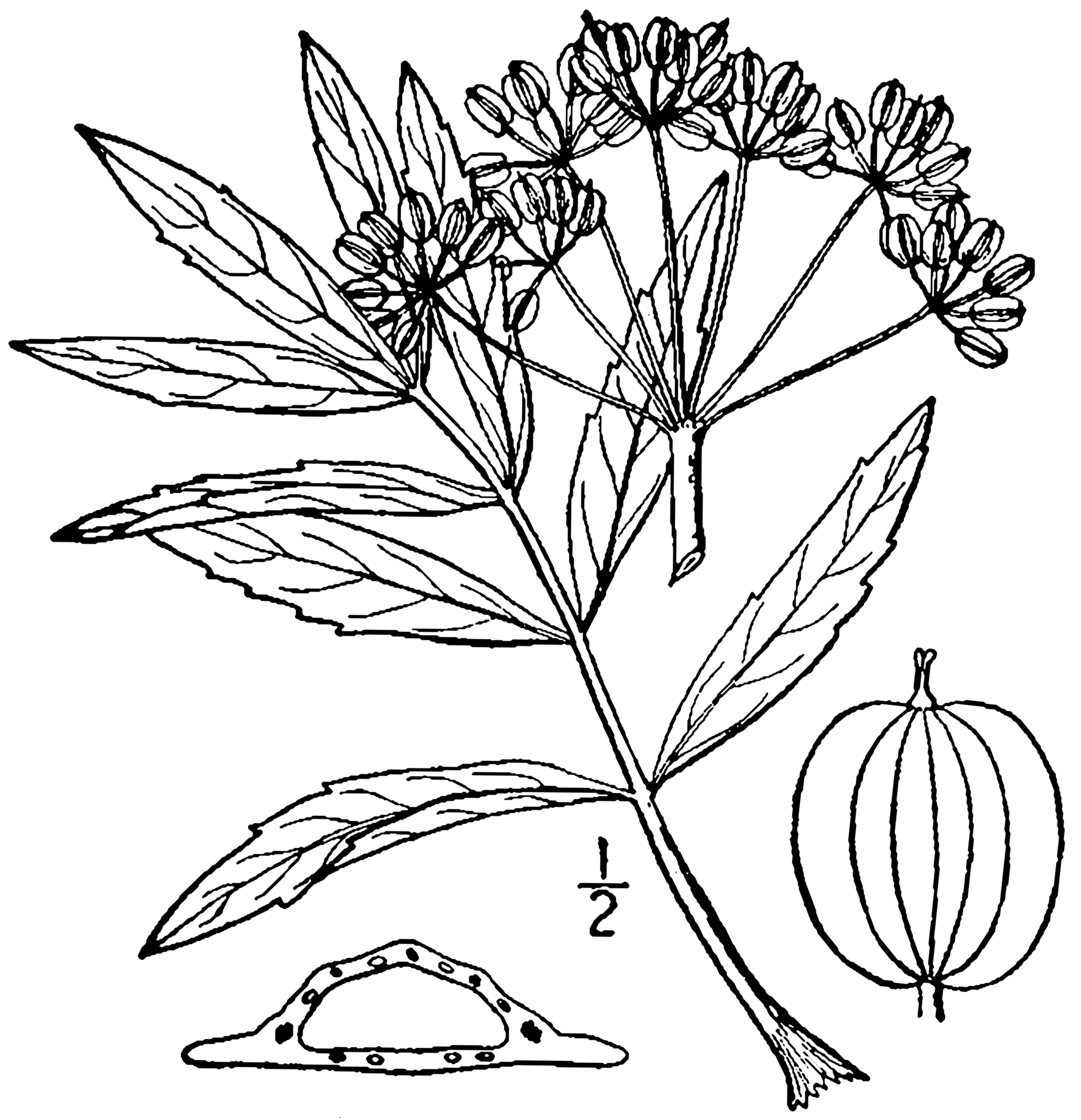
Illustration from Britton and Brown, 1913

Oxypolis rigidior, known as cowbane, common water dropwort, stiff cowbane, pig-potato, and Cherokee swamp potato, is a species of flowering plant in the carrot family native to eastern North America. It is a perennial wildflower found in wet habitats. Oxypolis rigidior has been reported as being poisonous to some mammals, but it is also considered edible and safe by some authors.

== Description ==
Oxypolis rigidior is 2–6 foot tall perennial herb of eastern North America. Its leaves are compound, odd-pinnate with 7-11 leaflets, and have variable shape. Umbels of 3 mm white flowers appear August to October. Flat fruits with conspicuous "wings" appear October through November.

The variable leaf shape may make identification challenging. Water hemlock, a related very poisonous species, which sometimes even shares the common name "cowbane", is similar, as is the closely related Savanna cowbane (Oxypolis ternata).

== Taxonomy ==
Two varieties have been described, O. rigidior var. rigidior and O. rigidior var. ambigua.

== Toxicity and edibility ==
Both the roots and top parts have been reported as poisonous to mammals including cattle. However, this plant is also considered edible and safe by some. Thayer states that it is "widely and erroneously reported as poisonous to livestock." He reports that the tubers are edible and says they are "fantastic in any way you'd use a potato"; he also adds that the shoots and greens are not poisonous, although he does not say they are edible as well. He calls the plant "Cherokee swamp potato" in reference to its use in Cherokee cuisine. He also warns that the plant should be gathered with “great caution” due to its resemblance to water hemlock.
