= Agatha Raisin and the Deadly Dance =

2004 novel by Marion Chesney

The Deadly Dance
- Author: M. C. Beaton (Marion Chesney)
- Language: English
- Series: Agatha Raisin
- Genre: Detective, Mystery novel
- Publisher: Minotaur Books
- Publication date: 2004
- Publication place: United Kingdom
- Media type: Print (Hardcover)
- Pages: 233 pp (Hardcover edition)
- ISBN: 978-0-312-30436-2
- Preceded by: Agatha Raisin and the Haunted House
- Followed by: Agatha Raisin and the Perfect Paragon

Agatha Raisin and the Deadly Dance is the fifteenth Agatha Raisin mystery novel by Marion Chesney under her pseudonym M. C. Beaton. She sets up her own detective agency, Raisin Investigations, having previously investigated as a hobby. There are three attempts to assassinate her, with two attempts killing another would-be assassin.

== Plot summary ==
In Paris on holiday Agatha is relieved of her wallet in what she calls the Paris Incident, and the attitude of the Paris Police nudges her into setting up her own detective agency. She finds an office in Mircester. Her new neighbour in what was James Lacey's cottage, Emma Comfrey, applies for the job of secretary in the office, and, uncharacteristically assertive, gets it. She has retired from the Ministry of Defence, where she has survived a Superglue investigation when she sabotages a popular colleagues’ computer. It turns out she is unbalanced and devious, with a vindictive nature when slighted. She gets a crush on Sir Charles Fraith, so aims to kill Agatha when Charles goes off with Agatha instead.

The agency's first case is a missing cat, and the second is to guard a divorcée's daughter, Cassandra, who has received a death threat. It turns out that her ex-husband Jeremy Laggat-Brown has supplied bomb timers to terrorists including the Provos, and is in love with Felicity Felliet who wants to recover her ancestral home which Mrs Laggat-Brown now has. Jeremy's real target is his ex-wife. He engages a Provisional IRA hitman Johnny Mulligan to kill Agatha. The jealous Emma Comfrey poisons Agatha's coffee with rat poison, which kills Mulligan who is waiting in her home to shoot her. Later Agatha is nearly gassed by Felicity. Finally after Emma is certified she escapes and goes to Agatha's cottage, but is shot by Felicity Felliet who also wants to shoot Agatha (but has not met her).

Agatha falls in love with Sir Charles Fraith again, and with the chief suspect, Jeremy Laggat-Brown. But she finds out that Harrison Peterson's death is murder not suicide, and disproves Jeremy Laggat-Brown's alibi - he has hired a drunken dropout to impersonate him in Paris. Inspector Fother of the Special Branch says he is .... damned if the papers are going to know that some dotty female from a provincial detective agency cracked a case that the Special Branch could not.
