= A Year in the Wild =

- Narrated by: Hermione Norris
- Country of origin: United Kingdom

Original release
- Network: BBC

A Year in the Wild is a 2012 British nature documentary series about the country's national parks. Produced by the BBC, the series is narrated by actress Hermione Norris. It consists of three episodes, each an hour long. The first episode, Snowdonia, premiered on 27 July 2012 and features Snowdonia National Park. Snowdonia is located in Wales, and is known for its hills and extinct volcanoes. The second episode, The New Forest, premiered on 3 August 2012. The episode explores the fauna of the New Forest National Park. The Park, located in southern England, was established in 2005 and is one of the country's newest national parks. The final episode of the series, Cairngorms, premiered on 10 August 2012. The Cairngorms National Park covers the Cairngorms mountain range in Scotland, and is Britain's largest national park, with an area of 4,528 km2. All three episodes describe the wildlife of each park, the ecosystem, and the people who live near, work, or frequent the parks.

== Reception ==
The premiere of the first episode attracted 484,000 viewers. Sam Wollaston of The Guardian called the first episode "absolutely lovely, the place, the film, everything", but questioned the logic of premiering the series during the 2012 Summer Olympics in London. A review of the second episode by David Stubbs was also positive, praising the episode as a "beautiful documentary." Ben Arnold, in a review of the third episode, called it "quite awesome", commenting that the episode was "augmented with some fabulously sharp photography". Before the series aired, an article in the Guardian suggested it as one of many shows to watch instead of the Olympics.
