= Harry Scott Gibbons =

British journalist and author (1927–2016)

- Born: 1927
- Died: November 2016 (aged 89); Stow-on-the-Wold, England
- Occupations: Journalist, author
- Spouse: Marion Chesney (m. 1969)
- Children: 1
- Writing career
- Notable work: The Genocide Files (1997)

Harry Scott Gibbons (1927 – November 2016) was a British journalist and author who reported on the Middle East and the Cyprus dispute.

He was the author of Peace Without Honour (1969) and The Genocide Files (1997), which examined the Cyprus crisis of 1963–64 and the Turkish invasion of Cyprus from an extreme pro-Turkish perspective. His accounts of the conflict have been widely criticized by historians and researchers for their pro-Turkish propagandistic bias, factual inaccuracies, and misrepresentation of historical evidence.

== Early career ==
Gibbons worked as a foreign correspondent for the Daily Express, covering the Middle East and Cyprus during the 1960s. He also worked in Greece and Turkey. After leaving the newspaper, he travelled through Europe and then began writing about the Cyprus conflict.

== Writings on Cyprus ==
Gibbons published Peace Without Honour in Ankara in 1969. The book examined the intercommunal violence that erupted in Cyprus in December 1963 and its consequences for the Turkish Cypriot population. It was later incorporated into his 1997 book The Genocide Files, published in London by Charles Bravos. The latter work, comprising 494 pages, expanded his account to include the events surrounding the Turkish invasion of 1974.

In The Genocide Files, Gibbons argued that Greek Cypriot nationalism and the pursuit of Enosis had led to organized violence against Turkish Cypriots, which he characterized as genocide. He presented the Turkish military intervention of July 1974 as a response to the conflict. Gibbons's books have been used by the Turkish Ministry of Foreign Affairs.

== Criticism ==
Gibbons's historical accounts have been criticized by scholars for their treatment of the Cyprus conflict. German historian Jan Asmussen considered his works heavily biased towards the Turkish viewpoint. Asmussen criticized Gibbon's failure to document crimes committed by Turkey and the Turkish Cypriot leadership. He particularly objected to Gibbons's use of the terms "genocide" and "ethnic cleansing" in relation to Turkish Cypriots, calling them "especially distasteful", notably because he also neglected the forced expulsion and massacres of Greek Cypriots in northern Cyprus.

Turkish researcher Cihat Arınç described Gibbons' works represented the official Turkish viewpoint noted that they served solely a "purely propagandistic effort and [are] not to be taken seriously". British political scientist and conflict studies researcher Paul Griffiths also cautioned that Gibbons's account should be treated with scepticism because of its pro-Turkish perspective.

French historians Étienne Copeaux and Claire Mauss-Copeaux similarly questioned the reliability of Gibbons's accounts. They argued that his detailed description of the December 1963 violence could give readers the impression that he had personally witnessed events that he had not. They also criticized his failure to identify sources, his use of stereotypes taken from Turkish propaganda, and his acknowledgment of assistance from the "director of the official information services of the Turkish Republic of Northern Cyprus". The authors advised caution when using his work.

Anthropologist and researcher Paul Sant Cassia described Gibbons as "a somewhat jaundiced and unreliable observer" and questioned several of his claims. In particular, he found no independent evidence supporting Gibbons's account of the alleged execution of 150 Turkish Cypriot hostages in December 1963, noting that the alleged victims did not even appear in the missing-person lists subsequently submitted by the Turkish Cypriot leadership. He also questioned an alleged account of an English schoolteacher who supposedly witnessed the executions and was subsequently sent to London, finding no evidence for this. Sant Cassia further challenged Gibbons's account of the ceasefire negotiations and questioned an allegation reproduced in his book that Greek medical staff had murdered Turkish Cypriot patients at the Nicosia General Hospital.

== Personal life ==
In 1969, Gibbons married journalist and novelist Marion Chesney, subsequently known by the pen name M. C. Beaton. They had a son, Charles. The couple later moved to the United States.

Gibbons died in November 2016, aged 89, while recovering from a fall at a nursing home in England.

== Selected works ==
- Peace Without Honour (Ankara: Ada Publishing House, 1969).
- The Hunter Equation (1981; as Harry Gibbons).
- Sign of Death (1981; as Barbara Merrell).
- Tall Woman: The Story of Virginia Dare (Bantam Books, 1985).
- The Genocide Files (London: Charles Bravos, 1997). ISBN 9780951446423.
