= Death of an Outsider =

1988 novel by Marion Chesney

- First edition
- Author: M. C. Beaton (Marion Chesney)
- Language: English
- Series: Hamish Macbeth
- Genre: Detective, Mystery novel
- Publisher: St. Martin's Press
- Publication date: November 1988
- Publication place: United Kingdom
- Media type: Print (Hardcover)
- Pages: 182 (Hardcover edition)
- ISBN: 0-312-02188-7 (first edition)
- OCLC: 17918653
- Dewey Decimal: 823/.914 19
- LC Class: PR6052.E196 D44 1988
- Preceded by: Death of a Cad
- Followed by: Death of a Perfect Wife

Death of an Outsider is the third mystery novel in the Hamish Macbeth series by Marion Chesney under her pseudonym M. C. Beaton. It was first published in 1988.

== Plot introduction ==
While Hamish Macbeth is on duty temporarily in Cnothan, William Mainwaring, the most disliked man in town is murdered. No one wants to solve the crime, including Macbeth's superiors who want to keep the strange manner of Mainwaring's death hushed up.
