= Matt McCooey =

English-Japanese actor

- Born: Nagoya, Japan
- Citizenship: British; Japanese
- Education: Aberystwyth University
- Occupation: Actor
- Years active: 2004–present

Matt McCooey is a British–Japanese actor best known for his role as DC Bill Wong in the television programme Agatha Raisin.

== Early life ==
McCooey is the son of author and journalist Chris McCooey and Kumiko Aoki. He was born in Nagoya, Japan, where his father was a lecturer and subsequently associate professor at Nagoya University of Commerce. He studied acting in Aberystwyth University and later trained at the Drama Studio, London, which he graduated in 2004.

== Career ==
McCooey has appeared in four Shakespeare productions - Romeo and Juliet (Changeling Company, 2004), Twelfth Night (Changeling Company, 2005), King Lear (Yellow Earth, 2006) and A Midsummer Night's Dream (Southwark Playhouse, 2009).

McCooey made his screen debut in the programme EastEnders.

In 2014, McCooey went on to play the role of DC Bill Wong in the British television programme Agatha Raisin. His other credits include Doctors, Skins and Invizimals.

In 2020, he joined the voice cast as Kenji in the UK and US versions of Thomas & Friends, respectively.

== Personal life ==
McCooey has a British Japanese dual citizenship.

== Filmography ==
=== Film ===
Year	Title	Role	Notes
2006	Take 3 Girls	Cop	
2007	Don't Stop Dreaming	Bobby	
2014	Limbo		Short film
2019	Jake and Kyle Get Wedding Dates	Taka (voice)	Credited as Matthew McCooey
2020	Thomas & Friends: Marvellous Machinery	Kenji (voice)	UK/US versions

=== Television ===
Year	Title	Role	Notes
2005	EastEnders	Assistant	One episode
2012	Skins	Philip	Episode: "Alex"
2013–2014	Invizimals	Keni (voice)	14 episodes
2014	Agatha Raisin and the Quiche of Death	DC Bill Wong	Television movie
2014–2022	Agatha Raisin	DC Bill Wong	Series regular
2016	Doctors	Tom Wu	Episode: "Shirley"
2017	A Proposal	Waiter	Television movie
2020	Thomas & Friends	Kenji (voice)	UK/US versions
2020	The Salisbury Poisonings	Mark O'Brian	Episode: "#1.1"
2021	Midsomer Murders	Steve Skelton	Episode: "The Wolf Hunter of Little Worthy"
2025	Sandokan	Sultan Muda Hashim of Brunei	

=== Video games ===
Year	Title	Role	Notes
2017	Final Fantasy XIV: Stormblood	Asahi sas Brutus (voice)	
2019	Total War: Three Kingdoms	Lu Bu (voice)	
2020	Final Fantasy XIV: Shadowbringers	Fandaniel (voice)	
2021	Final Fantasy XIV: Endwalker	Fandaniel/Asahi sas Brutus (voice)	
2024	Rise of the Rōnin	Hajime Saito (voice)	
