= Anna Karenina (1977 TV serial) =

1977 TV adaptation of Leo Tolstoy's novel

Anna Karenina is a 1977 BBC television adaptation of Leo Tolstoy's 1877 novel of the same name.

It stars Nicola Pagett as Anna, Eric Porter as Karenin, Stuart Wilson as Vronsky, Davyd Harries as Stiva, Robert Swann as Levin, and Caroline Langrishe as Kitty.

It consisted of ten 50-minute episodes, and so was able to include more of the original plot than some adaptations. It was mostly favourably received by critics.

The series was nominated for three BAFTA TV Awards, for Best Lighting, Best Costume Design, and Best Make Up; and for one Primetime Emmy Award, for Outstanding Art Direction for a Drama Series.
