= Richard Durden =

British actor

- Born: Mark Richard Durden-Smith; 8 February 1944 (age 82); Hendon, Middlesex, England
- Occupation: Actor
- Years active: 1967–present
- Spouses: Maria Aitken (m. 1968; div. 1971) Jane How (m. 1996)

Mark Richard Durden-Smith (born 8 February 1944), known as Richard Durden, is an English actor, with a range of television, film and stage credits.

== Personal life ==
Durden-Smith was educated at Haileybury and Imperial Service College and Merton College, Oxford in 1963.

Durden-Smith and Maria Aitken were married in 1968 and divorced in 1971. In 1996 he married actress Jane How. His older brother was Jo Durden-Smith.

== Filmography ==
=== Film ===
Year	Title	Role	Notes
1967	Doctor Faustus	Evil Angel / Knight	
1970	Scars of Dracula	Second Officer	
1989	Batman	TV Director	
1993	The Innocent	Black	
1995	The Grotesque	Sykes-Herring	
1996	Beaumarchais	Smith	
1998	The First 9½ Weeks	Laurence Garner	Direct-to-video film
1999	Mauá - O Imperador e o Rei	Barão de Rosthschild	
2001	Superstition	Minister of Justice	
2002	Amen.	Ambassador Taylor	
2002	The Reckoning	Town Justice	
2005	The Jacket	Dr. Hale	
2005	Oliver Twist	Unkind Board Member	
2005	The Best Man	Reverend	
2009	Agora	Olympius	
2009	The Heavy	Carl	
2009	21 and a Wake-Up	24th Evac Staff and Patients	
2010	From Paris With Love	Ambassador Thomas Bennington	
2011	Anonymous	Archbishop	
2011	The Awakening	Alexander Cathcart	
2012	Papadopoulos & Sons	Father Jimmy	
2015	Je suis daddy	Nigel Lawson	
2016	Late Shift	Samuel Parr	
2017	Churchill	Jan Smuts	
2018	Havergill		
2018	Postcards from London	Max	
2019	Star Wars: The Rise of Skywalker	First Order Officer #6	

=== Television ===
Year	Title	Role	Notes
1987	Inspector Morse	Alan Richards	1 episode
1988	Piece of Cake	Medical Officer	1 episode
1988	Noble House	Havergill	4 episodes
1989	The Man Who Lived at the Ritz	Man Ray	TV movie
1993	Agatha Christie's Poirot; The Case of the Missing Will	Dr Pritchard	1 episode
1997	Dressing for Breakfast	Graham	3 episodes
1999	The Worst Witch	The Chief Wizard, Egbert Hellibore	3 episodes
1999	Highlander	Anton Novak	1 episode
2003	Midsomer Murders	Duncan Goff	1 episode
2004	Dunkirk	Lord Halifax	TV movie, Documentary
2004	Agatha Christie's Marple	Mr. Prestcott	1 episode
2006	Nuremberg: Nazis on Trial	Lord Justice Lawrence	3 episodes, Documentary
2007	Pumpkinhead: Blood Feud	Old Man Hatfield	TV movie
2009	The Last Days of Lehman Brothers	Harvey Miller	TV movie
2014	Agatha Raisin and the Quiche of Death	Mr. Boggle	TV movie / Pilot episode
2015	Wolf Hall	Bishop Fisher	1 episode
2016	Agatha Raisin	Mr. Boggle	3 episodes
2019–	Back to Life	Oscar	Series 1 and 2
2019	Brexit: The Uncivil War	Bill Cash	TV movie
2019–23	Ghosts	Charles Worthing	4 episodes
2021	Silent Witness	Conor	1 episode
2024	Sister Boniface Mysteries	Arthur Salem	Series 3, episode 2: "House of Misfit Dolls"
2026–present	Harry Potter	Professor Cuthberth Binns	

On radio, he played Bashwood in Armadale.
