= Marji Campi =

British actress (born 1938)

Marji Campi (born 19 October 1938) is a British actress, known for her roles as Dulcie Froggatt in Coronation Street (1984–1987), Joyce Watson in Surgical Spirit (1989–1995) and Jessie Hilton in Brookside (1998–2002). Born in Liverpool, she trained at East 15 Acting School in the 1960s.

Campi has made appearances in various other television series, including Cold Feet, Heartbeat, Doctors, The Bill, Casualty, Where the Heart Is, EastEnders, Z-Cars, The Impressions Show and Way to Go. Her stage appearances include Martha in Arsenic and Old Lace at Salisbury Playhouse (2009), and the twin roles of Barbara/Dorothy in Country Life (2010–2011). In March 2020, she appeared in an episode of the BBC soap opera Doctors as April Langbury. She returned to the soap in March 2023, this time in the role of Constance 'Connie' Wheatley.

She is married to historical fiction writer Anton Gill.
