= Death of a Hussy =

1990 novel by Marion Chesney

- First edition (publ. St. Martin's Press)
- Author: M. C. Beaton
- Language: English
- Publisher: St. Martin's Press
- Publication date: 1990
- ISBN: 0-312-05071-2 (first edition)
- Dewey Decimal: 823.914
- LC Class: PR6052.E196 D425

Death of a Hussy is a mystery novel by M. C. Beaton (Marion Chesney), first published in 1990. It is set in the fictional village of Lochdubh, Scotland, and features the local constable Hamish Macbeth.

== Plot introduction ==
Maggie Baird, the hussy of the title, has decided she wants to get married again. She invites four of her previous lovers to her home in Lochdubh for a holiday and informs them that she will marry one of them. Maggie is forthright. She's rich and she has a serious heart condition and she will leave her money to the man she decides to marry. Maggie's death at first appears to be an unfortunate accident. But Hamish Macbeth, Lochdubh's local policeman has his doubts.

== Plot ==
Maggie Baird is a newcomer to Lochdubh. Her considerable wealth has been garnered from a life of being the mistress of rich men. Not technically a prostitute, Maggie has nevertheless traded her looks and her sexual favours for money and material gain. Unlike the men with whom she involved herself, Maggie is financially astute and has invested wisely. In Lochdubbh, she arrives as a middle aged woman, fat and dressed in tweed suits. Her niece, Alison Kerr, comes to live with her aunt after a serious operation for cancer. Alison is a diffident young woman, easily intimidated by her domineering aunt.

Hamish Macbeth and his dog Towser are living in Strathbane. Lochdubh's police station has been closed. Neither Hamish, walking the beat with PC Mary Graham, nor Towser, housed in police dog kennels with German Shepherds, is happy to be away from their village.

Maggie Baird, at a dinner party with the Halbuton-Smyths in Lochdubh, learns that the villagers are missing their local bobby, Hamish Macbeth. Maggie is intrigued and decides to rally the village to instigate a mini crime wave to have Hamish reinstated. Despite offending a number of the locals, the crime wave is set in motion and the senior police at Strathbane decide that it is indeed a necessity to have a local policeman. Hamish and Towser gleefully return to Lochdubh.

At the celebrations for Hamish's return, Maggie catches a glimpse of herself in a shop window and is shocked to see the fat, frumpish woman she has become. She announces to Alison and to her housekeeper, Mrs. Todd, that she is going away for several months to take herself in hand. During her absence, Alison is tasked with typing up Maggie's frankly pornographic memoirs.

Maggie returns transformed into the beautiful woman she once was, thanks to cosmetic surgery and expensive treatments. She announces to Alison and Mrs. Todd that she has invited four former lovers to visit. She will select a husband from these visitors, openly letting everyone know that she is very rich and has a very serious heart condition.

The former lovers have been in love with Maggie in their youth. She spent time with them but took their money in exchange for the things they did. Each man is now in difficult financial circumstances and somewhat bitter that Maggie is so rich, at their expense. Alison is anxious that a potential marriage could displace her as Maggie's heiress.

A simple fire in Maggie's car engine was not potentially fatal, but the shock clearly triggered a heart attack. Maggie's death is seen to have been an accident by the detectives from Strathbane, led by Hamish Macbeth's arch enemy, Blair. Hamish has his doubts. Too many people could wish Maggie dead. Each of the four previous lovers was overheard asking Maggie for a loan, Alison could be financially destitute by Maggie's remarriage and then there are the salacious memoires that have mysteriously disappeared. A second death leaves Hamish in no doubt. There is a murderer in Lochdubh. And it is Hamish who reveals just who that murderer is.
