= Death of a Gentle Lady =

2008 novel by Marion Chesney

- Cover of the first edition of Death of a Gentle Lady
- Author: M. C. Beaton (Marion Chesney)
- Series: Hamish Macbeth
- Genre: Detective, Mystery novel
- Publisher: Grand Central Publishing
- Publication date: 11 February 2008
- Publication place: United Kingdom
- Media type: Print (hardcover)
- Pages: 256 pp (Hardcover edition)
- ISBN: 0-446-58260-3 (first edition)
- OCLC: 123029835
- Dewey Decimal: 823/.914 22
- LC Class: PR6053.H4535 D34 2008
- Preceded by: Death of a Maid
- Followed by: Death of a Witch

Death of a Gentle Lady is the twenty-fourth mystery novel in the Hamish Macbeth series by M. C. Beaton. It was first published in 2008.

== Plot introduction ==
While the rest of the town is smitten by Mrs. Gentle, Hamish Macbeth distrusts and dislikes her. When she tries to close down his beloved station, he exacts his revenge and saves a beautiful woman from deportation at the same time by proposing to Gentle's maid Ayesha. By the time the wedding day arrives, Hamish is desperate to escape marriage; when Ayesha doesn't appear and Mrs. Gentle is found dead, he escapes one disaster only to be swept into another.
