= Cowbane =

Cowbane is a common name for several plants and may refer to:

- Cicuta virosa, a poisonous species of Cicuta, native to northern and central Europe, northern Asia, and northwestern North America
- Oxypolis, a small genus of North American flowering plants in the carrot family
