= Oxypolis occidentalis =

Scientific classification
- Kingdom: Plantae
- Clade: Tracheophytes
- Clade: Angiosperms
- Clade: Eudicots
- Clade: Asterids
- Order: Apiales
- Family: Apiaceae
- Genus: Oxypolis
- Species: O. occidentalis

Binomial name
- Oxypolis occidentalis J.M.Coult. & Rose

Species of flowering plant

Oxypolis occidentalis is a species of flowering plant in the carrot family known by the common name western cowbane. It is native to sections of western North America, where it grows in forests and other habitat. It is a perennial herb growing from tubers and producing erect, branching stems up to 1.5 meters tall. The leaf has a blade up to 30 centimeters long which is divided into many toothed, lobed, or deeply cut leaflets. The blade is borne on a long petiole, with upper leaves having larger petioles than basal. The inflorescence is a dense compound umbel of many small white flowers.
