= Simon Wheeler =

British screenwriter, producer (active 1988–2014)

Simon Wheeler is a British screenwriter and television producer. He may be best known for creating the ITV1 drama Kingdom (2007–2009), which starred Stephen Fry and Wheeler's wife, Hermione Norris.

Having entering the film business in 1988, as a labourer in the New Zealand / Australia co-production of The Navigator: A Medieval Odyssey, Wheeler worked through the ranks as a grip and a script editor. He was a writer for the crime series Wire in the Blood, which formerly starred Norris. His last screen credit was producer of the BBC miniseries, Castles in the Sky, in 2014.

== Family ==
Wheeler is one of the three sons of General Sir Roger Wheeler. He and Norris have two children together: Wilf, born June 2004, and Hero, born August 2007.
