= Death of a Macho Man =

Novel by M. C. Beaton

- First edition
- Author: M. C. Beaton
- Language: English
- Genre: Mystery
- Published: Hardback, paperback, E-book
- Publisher: Mysterious Press
- Publication date: 1996
- Publication place: United Kingdom
- Pages: 281 pp

Death of a Macho Man is a mystery novel by M. C. Beaton (Marion Chesney), first published in 1996. It is set in the fictional town of Lochdubh, Scotland featuring the local constable Hamish Macbeth.

== Plot introduction ==
Randy Duggan is the macho man of the title of this work of fiction. He claims to be a professional wrestler and he becomes known in the small village of Lochdubh for his tall stories. When Randy is found murdered, Constable Hamish Macbeth hopes that the killer is not one of the villagers. However, there is enough local resentment against Randy, that someone in quiet, peaceful Lochdubh may have been driven to slaying this macho man.

== Plot ==
Randy Duggan arrives in Lochdubh claiming to be an American professional wrestler. A huge, muscular man, he dominates the bar in Lochdubh's pub. At first the locals are enthralled by Randy's fascinating stories of his apparently exciting life and his generosity with paying for drinks. Their interest begins to pall when they realise that Randy's accent, when he is drunk, betrays his Scottish origins and that he is a braggart and a bully and openly insults the local men, including Geordie Mackenzie, a mild retired school teacher and local fisherman, Archie Maclean. Both the latter are heard to claim that they will kill Randy.

Constable Hamish Macbeth intervenes in a verbal argument between Randy Duggan and Geordie Mackenzie. Randy claims that Hamish is hiding behind his uniform and would not consider challenging Randy as a civilian. Hamish accepts the challenge and agrees to face Randy in a fight. Hamish bitterly regrets this challenge next day, but as the whole village of Lochdubh has turned out to witness the fight, Hamish decides he must go through with it. Randy does not meet the appointed time for the fight. Archie Maclean volunteers to go to Randy's cottage to insist he meet this commitment. Archie finds Randy's very dead body. And Hamish Macbeth is a suspect in the death of a macho man.

Hamish knows that the detective team from the fictional town of Strathbane, led by his archenemy, Chief Inspector Blair, will question his actions in arranging a fight with the deceased. He is in trouble, but pretends that he did not intend to engage in a fight, but rather have the whole village witness Hamish berate Randy Duggan for his loutish behaviour and his rudeness to the local people. To Blair's disgust, this explanation is accepted.

Hamish discovers that the macho man has been involved with many of the villagers. Several women in particular appear to have been smitten by Randy's macho charm. One of these women is Rosie Draly, a writer of romantic historical fiction. When Rosie is murdered, Hamish is baffled to find a connection between her death and the death of Randy Duggan. Blair is convinced that he has solved the case. Rosie's brother in law, passionately in love with her for many years, confesses to killing her and Randy Duggan. Rosie would not consent to marry her brother in law and he was jealous of Randy's attentions to Rosie.

Blair is happy to have the murders solved. Hamish is not convinced that Rosie's brother in law killed Duggan and makes this known. Hamish, with his usual reliance on his intuition and following up possible although apparently unlikely leads, unearths the truth. Rosie was murdered by her brother in law, but Randy Duggan was not. The murderer of the macho man was in Lochdubh all the time. Hamish saves Priscilla Halburton-Smythe from a murderous kidnapper and shoots this man. In doing so, Hamish has revealed the solution to a long unsolved crime in Scotland and proven the identity of the mysterious "Gentleman Jim", the brains behind this notorious crime.

Despite his success, Hamish is once again out of favour with his superiors in Strathbane. Hamish is deemed to be too unorthodox, too much a maverick to be allowed to remain in the police force. The villagers of Lochdubh march into Strathbane and demand that their village constable retains his position in Lochdubh. Given the media coverage of his success and the flashing cameras and television crews accompanying the villagers' march, his superiors agree that Constable Macbeth is best left alone to police his beloved village.
