= Pulaski (TV series) =

British television series

- Also known as: Pulaski: The TV Detective
- Created by: Roy Clarke
- Starring: David Andrews; Caroline Langrishe
- Theme music composer: The Shadows
- Country of origin: United Kingdom
- Original language: English
- No. of seasons: 1
- No. of episodes: 8

Production
- Producer: Paul Knight
- Running time: 50 minutes
- Production company: BBC

Original release
- Network: BBC1
- Release: 2 October – 20 November 1987

Pulaski is a British television drama series produced by the BBC in 1987.

Created by Roy Clarke, the series was a pastiche detective drama in which Larry Summers, an American actor starring in a British detective series in the title role of Pulaski, who finds himself involved in real life cases. He was assisted by his co-star Kate Smith, who played his sidekick Briggsy in the series.

The theme music was performed by The Shadows.

== Cast ==
- David Andrews as Larry Summers/Pulaski
- Caroline Langrishe as Kate Smith/Briggsy
- Kate Harper as Paula Wilson
- Rolf Saxon as Jerome Summers
- Bryan Marshall as Billy Gems

== Episodes ==
No.	Title	Directed by	Written by	Original release date
1	"The Fictional Detective"	Christopher King	Roy Clarke	2 October 1987
2	"The Price of Fame"	Gerry Poulson	Andrew Payne	9 October 1987
3	"Violence, Love and Ratings"	Gerry Poulson	Geoffrey Case	16 October 1987
4	"And the Killer of Rose Amelia Bonner"	Christopher King	Roy Clarke	23 October 1987
5	"The Lone Granger"	Gerry Mill	Roy Clarke	30 October 1987
6	"Tough Guys Don't Blink"	Gerry Mill	Geoffrey Case	6 November 1987
7	"Ten by Eight Glossy"	Roger Bamford	Richard Carpenter	13 November 1987
8	"No Guns Please We're British"	Gerry Mill	Geoffrey Case	20 November 1987
