= Surgical Spirit (TV series) =

British TV sitcom (1989–1995)

- Genre: Sitcom
- Created by: Peter Learmouth
- Written by: Annie Bruce; Raymond Dixon; Graeme Garden; Peter Learmouth; Paul McKenzie; Annie Wood
- Directed by: David Askey; John Kaye Cooper
- Starring: Nichola McAuliffe; Duncan Preston; Marji Campi
- Theme music composer: David Cullen
- Country of origin: United Kingdom
- Original language: English
- No. of series: 7
- No. of episodes: 50

Production
- Executive producers: Humphrey Barclay; Andy Harries; David Liddiment; Al Mitchell; David Shanks; Antony Wood
- Producer: Humphrey Barclay
- Production locations: Lister Hospital, Stevenage, Hertfordshire
- Running time: 30 minutes (including commercials)
- Production companies: Humphrey Barclay Productions; Granada Television

Original release
- Network: ITV
- Release: 14 April 1989 – 7 July 1995

Surgical Spirit is a British television sitcom starring Nichola McAuliffe and Duncan Preston that aired from 14 April 1989 to 7 July 1995. It was written by Annie Bruce, Raymond Dixon, Graeme Garden, Peter Learmouth, Paul McKenzie and Annie Wood. It was made for the ITV network by Humphrey Barclay Productions for Granada Television. In January 2022, Forces TV started showing all 50 episodes of Surgical Spirit, while the first two series were made available on BritBox in April 2022.

== Plot ==
The series was based around Sheila Sabatini, a senior surgeon at the Gillies Hospital, whose verbal skills have most people running for cover as her tongue is as sharp as her scalpel. She dominated the operating theatre, while at home she was divorcing her Italian husband, Remo, with whom she had a son, Daniel. Sheila was also a gossip, often gossiping with her best friend, theatre administrator Joyce Watson.

One of the major themes in the programme was her developing relationship with Jonathan Haslam, the anaesthetist. At the end of the sixth series, they married and she had become director of surgery, while her son had become a medical student at the hospital, much to her annoyance.

== Cast ==
- Nichola McAuliffe as Mrs. Sheila Sabatini
- Duncan Preston as Dr. Jonathan Haslam
- Marji Campi as Joyce Watson
- David Conville as Mr. George Hope-Wynne
- Emlyn Price as Mr. Neil Copeland
- Suzette Llewellyn as Sister Cheryl Patching
- Beresford le Roy as Michael Sampson
- Lyndam Gregory as Dr. Simon Field (series 1–4)
- Simon Harrison as Mr. Giles Peake
- Andrew Groves as Daniel Sabatini

== Production ==
The outside shots were of Lister Hospital in Stevenage, Hertfordshire. Additional filming locations were in St Albans, Hertfordshire.

== Cancellation ==
Granada Television decided to decommission the programme after the conclusion of the seventh series.

== Episodes ==
=== Series overview ===
Series
| Series | Episodes | Originally released | |
| Series | Episodes | First released | Last released |
|---|---|---|---|
| 1 | 6 | 14 April 1989 | 19 May 1989 |
| 2 | 7 | 27 April 1990 | 8 June 1990 |
| 3 | 7 | 4 January 1991 | 15 February 1991 |
| 4 | 6 | 14 February 1992 | 20 March 1992 |
| 5 | 7 | 19 February 1993 | 2 April 1993 |
| 6 | 10 | 7 January 1994 | 11 March 1994 |
| 7 | 7 | 26 May 1995 | 7 July 1995 |

=== Series 1 (1989) ===
| No. overall | No. in series | Title | Directed by | Written by | Original release date |
|---|---|---|---|---|---|
| 1 | 1 | "The Lecture" | John Kaye Cooper | Peter Learmouth | 14 April 1989 |
Surgeon Sheila Sabatini is called in to give a lecture, but wishes to travel to France to visit her son; her only option is to coax her colleague Dr Haslam into doing it for her.
| 2 | 2 | "The Locum" | John Kaye Cooper | Peter Learmouth | 21 April 1989 |
A doctor is away on holiday; locum Dr Olsen steps in and causes chaos.
| 3 | 3 | "Joyce's Ulcer" | John Kaye Cooper | Peter Learmouth | 28 April 1989 |
Joyce suffers an ulcer and desperately needs an all-important operation, but she has a reason for not wanting it done on the ward.
| 4 | 4 | "The Country, Right or Wrong" | John Kaye Cooper | Peter Learmouth | 5 May 1989 |
After pressure from Joyce and realising that she is antagonising her fellow surgeons even more than usual, Sheila decides she needs a small break and asks Jonathan whether she can join him on his weekend fishing trip in the country. However, the weekend doesn't quite live up to either of their expectations.
| 5 | 5 | "Fame" | John Kaye Cooper | Peter Learmouth | 12 May 1989 |
When Hope Wynne has his face in The Daily Mail, Sheila has to go one better.
| 6 | 6 | "Sammy Eldridge" | John Kaye Cooper | Peter Learmouth | 19 May 1989 |
Neil Copeland has a painting in a gallery, and a face from Sheila's past ends up on the ward.

=== Series 2 (1990) ===
| No. overall | No. in series | Title | Directed by | Written by | Original release date |
|---|---|---|---|---|---|
| 7 | 1 | "Cold Cuts" | David Askey | Peter Learmouth | 27 April 1990 |
When hospital domestic Lily is about to lose her job, her cause is taken up by Sheila.
| 8 | 2 | "The Copeland Affair" | David Askey | Peter Learmouth | 4 May 1990 |
The staff are unhappy working with new colleague Katie, and they want to move her on; the trouble is that she's having an affair with one of the senior consultants.
| 9 | 3 | "Educating Daniel" | David Askey | Peter Learmouth | 11 May 1990 |
Sheila is thrown when her son Daniel turns up at one of her lectures, having fled from school.
| 10 | 4 | "Doubting Thomas" | David Askey | Peter Learmouth | 18 May 1990 |
Sheila's locum Thomas makes an error during an operation, which puts a spanner in the works for all the consultants that have private work.
| 11 | 5 | "The Phone Call" | David Askey | Peter Learmouth | 25 May 1990 |
Sheila gets an unexpected telephone call from her estranged husband. Jonathan buys a new car from a flirtatious dealer.
| 12 | 6 | "The Garden Party" | David Askey | Peter Learmouth | 1 June 1990 |
Sheila is invited to meet The Queen; she wants to invite Jonathan, but he has his sights set on watching England play Australia at The Oval.
| 13 | 7 | "Something in the Air" | David Askey | Peter Learmouth | 8 June 1990 |
Simon is about to marry a fellow professional, much to Jonathan's disapproval. Joyce is perturbed when she's given an efficient junior.

=== Series 3 (1991) ===
| No. overall | No. in series | Title | Directed by | Written by | Original release date |
|---|---|---|---|---|---|
| 14 | 1 | "The Holiday Job" | David Askey | Peter Learmouth | 4 January 1991 |
Daniel takes up a job in the hospital, but the lines between son and subordinate blur.
| 15 | 2 | "Only a Roach!" | David Askey | Peter Learmouth | 11 January 1991 |
The hospital suffers a very nasty infestation of cockroaches, and only Sheila will deal with them.
| 16 | 3 | "Making News" | David Askey | Peter Learmouth | 18 January 1991 |
Sheila appears on a live TV show opposite a surgeon from a private hospital to discuss the issues of alcohol and smoking; her remarks lead to outrage in the press.
| 17 | 4 | "The Folks on the Hill" | David Askey | Peter Learmouth | 25 January 1991 |
Sheila decides to raise funds for the children's ward by arranging a charity fun run.
| 18 | 5 | "Close to the Edge" | David Askey | Peter Learmouth | 1 February 1991 |
Sheila is concerned that her colleague Quentin is suffering some mental ill health issues, despite her colleagues being oblivious.
| 19 | 6 | "The Earth Trembles" | David Askey | Peter Learmouth | 8 February 1991 |
Jonathan asks Sheila out, but she has a prior engagement with Joyce. Jonathan takes out an old friend.
| 20 | 7 | "The Rover's Return" | David Askey | Peter Learmouth | 15 February 1991 |
Jonathan has developed a friendship with colleague Annie, much to Sheila's annoyance; her problems worsen when Remo arrives.

=== Series 4 (1992) ===
| No. overall | No. in series | Title | Directed by | Written by | Original release date |
|---|---|---|---|---|---|
| 21 | 1 | "The Mating Game" | David Askey | Peter Learmouth | 14 February 1992 |
Giles has the idea of playing music during surgery, with the intention of keeping everyone relaxed.
| 22 | 2 | "Joyce's Little Turn" | David Askey | Peter Learmouth | 21 February 1992 |
A box containing pethidine goes missing, sending Joyce into a blind panic.
| 23 | 3 | "The Son also Rises" | David Askey | Peter Learmouth | 28 February 1992 |
Daniel is on his half-term break; he plans to stay with new girlfriend Nina, but this has complications.
| 24 | 4 | "Oh, Happy Day" | David Askey | Peter Learmouth | 6 March 1992 |
A position has come up at The Whitcliff, and Sheila wants it; a social gathering event gives her the chance to pitch for it.
| 25 | 5 | "The Fence" | David Askey | Peter Learmouth | 13 March 1992 |
Sheila gets mugged, and is surprised when her belongings start appearing on the hospital ward.
| 26 | 6 | "Wanderlust" | David Askey | Peter Learmouth | 20 March 1992 |
Sheila is set to give a lecture in Australia, about which Jonathan is eternally jealous.

=== Series 5 (1993) ===
| No. overall | No. in series | Title | Directed by | Written by | Original release date |
|---|---|---|---|---|---|
| 27 | 1 | "Congratulations!" | David Askey | Peter Learmouth | 19 February 1993 |
Jonathan and Sheila are now officially dating, but he is irritated with her for taking on more work.
| 28 | 2 | "Sheila's Baby" | David Askey | Peter Learmouth | 26 February 1993 |
Sheila's appointed a new house surgeon, her protegée Jamila Banergee; she is intelligent, but is she suited to surgery?
| 29 | 3 | "The Right Man for the Job" | David Askey | Peter Learmouth | 5 March 1993 |
Sheila has asked Jonathan to move in with her, but she's hiding something: a family member.
| 30 | 4 | "A Marvellous Opportunity" | David Askey | Peter Learmouth | 12 March 1993 |
A flu epidemic has decimated the number of nurses currently working in the hospital. Joyce gets the opportunity for a job upstairs.
| 31 | 5 | "Trial by Fury" | David Askey | Peter Learmouth | 19 March 1993 |
As Director of Surgery, Sheila has put the brakes on when it comes to spending money. The annual get-together suffers.
| 32 | 6 | "You Won't Feel a Thing" | David Askey | Peter Learmouth | 26 March 1993 |
A prisoner comes into The Gillies for a hernia operation; he makes a serious claim against Dr Haslam when he comes round.
| 33 | 7 | "Moan, Moan, Moan" | David Askey | Peter Learmouth | 2 April 1993 |
Jonathan is jealous, because Sheila is speaking to colleague Digby Gillingham a lot. Poor Giles is exhausted, because he's working exceptionally long hours.

=== Series 6 (1994) ===
| No. overall | No. in series | Title | Directed by | Written by | Original release date |
|---|---|---|---|---|---|
| 34 | 1 | "Yes or No" | David Askey | Peter Learmouth | 7 January 1994 |
Jonathan wants an answer from Sheila; she's looking for more passion. Cheryl is putting it about that Joyce has had surgery.
| 35 | 2 | "The Morning After" | David Askey | Annie Bruce | 14 January 1994 |
It's the morning after the engagement celebration; Sheila feels guilty for her behaviour, as does Jonathan.
| 36 | 3 | "Daniel's Stunt" | David Askey | Peter Learmouth | 21 January 1994 |
It's student rag week, and Neil Copeland's car ends up on the roof. Jonathan and Sheila experience major difficulties in their relationship.
| 37 | 4 | "The Deaf Sentence" | David Askey | Greame Garden | 28 January 1994 |
Jonathan has decided he can no longer work with Sheila. Joyce is now treating patients as customers.
| 38 | 5 | "Midnight Bugler" | David Askey | Raymond Dixon | 4 February 1994 |
Jonathan has to have an operation, and Sheila is concerned for the welfare of her former fiancé.
| 39 | 6 | "On the Rebound" | David Askey | Annie Wood | 11 February 1994 |
Having been ditched, Jonathan finds himself dating an attractive, younger nurse, Laura.
| 40 | 7 | "Hot Gossip" | David Askey | Peter Learmouth | 18 February 1994 |
Joyce and Cheryl compete with each other to give out malicious gossip, but, when an important bit of news gets out, nobody believes it.
| 41 | 8 | "Cost Cutting Exercises" | David Askey | Paul McKenzie | 25 February 1994 |
Sheila has to make savings, meaning some operations must be cancelled. One problematic case seems to push her and Jonathan a little closer.
| 42 | 9 | "Reunion Night" | David Askey | Graeme Garden | 4 March 1994 |
Sheila has a medical school reunion, but Paco's busy, and nobody else is free to accompany her.
| 43 | 10 | "For Richer, for Poorer" | David Askey | Peter Learmouth | 11 March 1994 |
The wedding date has been confirmed, but a setback with the pools sees Sheila being sent to Coventry.

=== Series 7 (1995) ===
| No. overall | No. in series | Title | Directed by | Written by | Original release date |
|---|---|---|---|---|---|
| 44 | 1 | "Driving it Home" | David Askey | Peter Learmouth | 26 May 1995 |
Giles decides that it's time to learn to drive for the first time; after Neil fails to teach him it falls on Jonathan. Daniel gets his mentor, his mother, while Joyce develops an unhealthy sausage roll obsession.
| 45 | 2 | "Rhyme or Reason" | David Askey | Raymond Dixon | 2 June 1995 |
Sheila is irate that Jonathan is late with the telephone bill; a refusal to have a joint account causes questions.
| 46 | 3 | "All Put Together" | David Askey | Greame Garden | 9 June 1995 |
Giles cracks under pressure during an operation, and has to call Sheila for help, ruining his chances of a senior post at Solihull.
| 47 | 4 | "The Silence of the Haslams" | David Askey | Greame Garden | 16 June 1995 |
A famous pop star is set to have an operation at The Gillies. The press get hold of the story, but so does the star's crazed stalker.
| 48 | 5 | "The Walkout" | David Askey | Peter Learmouth | 23 June 1995 |
The domestic and support staff have gone on strike, leaving the surgeons to muck in.
| 49 | 6 | "Kicking Against the Pricks" | David Askey | Greame Garden | 30 June 1995 |
Sheila isn't happy when a patient wants to use acupuncture as a form of anaesthetic, but Jonathan approves.
| 50 | 7 | "Administrator of the Year" | David Askey | Peter Learmouth | 7 July 1995 |
Joyce is up for administrator of the year, and a few nights in a posh hotel. Her task is made difficult when the staff room is removed. Jonathan and Sheila return from their honeymoon early.

== Home releases ==
All seven series of Surgical Spirit have now been released on DVD. An 8-disc set of the complete series has also been released.

| DVD | Year(s) | Release date (Region 2) | Release date (Region 4) |
|---|---|---|---|
| The Complete Series 1 | 1989 | 28 May 2007 | 3 November 2011 |
| The Complete Series 2 | 1990 | 4 May 2009 | 3 November 2011 |
| The Complete Series 3 | 1991 | 17 August 2009 | TBA |
| The Complete Series 4 | 1992 | 18 January 2010 | TBA |
| The Complete Series 5 | 1993 | 19 April 2010 | TBA |
| The Complete Series 6 | 1994 | 5 July 2010 | TBA |
| The Complete Series 7 | 1995 | 23 August 2010 | TBA |
| The Complete Series | 1989-1995 | 4 October 2010 | TBA |
