= Death of a Gossip =

1985 novel by Marion Chesney

- First edition
- Author: M. C. Beaton (Marion Chesney)
- Language: English
- Series: Hamish Macbeth
- Genre: Detective, Mystery novel
- Publisher: St. Martin's Press
- Publication date: 1985
- Publication place: United Kingdom
- Media type: Print
- Pages: 166 pp (Hardcover)
- ISBN: 0-312-18637-1 (first edition)
- OCLC: 11290121
- Dewey Decimal: 823.914 19
- LC Class: PR6052.E196 D4 1985
- Followed by: Death of a Cad

Death of a Gossip is a mystery novel by M. C. Beaton (Marion Chesney), first published in 1985. It is set in the fictional town of Lochdubh, Scotland and is the first novel of a series featuring the local constable Hamish Macbeth.

== Plot ==
Eight people of varied background meet in the fictional village of Lochdubh in Northern Scotland. They attend the Lochdubh School of Casting : Salmon and Trout Fishing, owned and operated by John Cartwright and his wife Heather. What should be a relaxing holiday amid glorious Highland lochs and mountains becomes a misery. One of the party, Lady Jane Withers, a society widow and notorious gossip columnist, upsets everyone with her snobbishness, sharp tongue and rudeness. Lady Jane soon learns that each of her fellow guests has a secret in their past that they would prefer to remain unknown. When her Ladyship is found dead in Keeper's Pool, no-one is surprised and everyone is relieved.

Hamish Macbeth, Lochdubh's local policeman, has to search for a murderer amongst the many suspects. No-one is willing to talk. With the assistance of Priscilla Halburton-Smythe, the love of his life, Hamish solves the mystery in his usual unorthodox style. Hamish's success does not endear him to Chief Inspector Blair, a senior detective from the nearby fictional town of Strathbane.

== Characters ==
- John Cartwright: Owner of the Lochdubh School of Casting: Salmon and Trout Fishing
- Heather Cartwright: Wife of John, joint manager of the school, believed to be the better angler
- Hamish Macbeth: Lochdubh's village constable
- Mr. Marvin Roth: A wealthy American from New York who is planning to run for office
- Mrs. Amy Roth: the wealthy American's wife, related to an old Southern family
- Lady Jane Winders: Widow of a Labour Peer; she is "The Gossip"; a gossip columnist for newspaper
- Jeremy Blythe: A barrister from London
- Alice Wilson: A secretary from London
- Charlie Baxter: A twelve-year-old from Manchester with divorced parents
- Major Peter Frame: Former army officer, the only member of the class with prior fishing experience
- Daphene Gore: A debutante from Oxford
- Priscilla Halburton-Smythe: The daughter of a wealthy local landowner

== Genre ==
Death of a Gossip is a slightly modified version of an English Drawing Room Mystery. This type of mystery brings together a group of people, one of the group is murdered and the detective, private investigator or amateur sleuth solves the crime by careful observation of the group. At the end of the novel they are all brought together in a drawing room where one by one each person is shown to be innocent and the guilty party is exposed.

== Publication history ==
- 1985, USA, St. Martin's Press ISBN 978-0-312-18637-1, Pub Date March 1985, Hardcover
- 1988, USA, Fawcett Publications publisher ISBN 978-0-312-18637-1, Pub date 12 April 1988, Mass Market Paperback
- 1999, USA, Grand Central Publishing, ISBN 978-0-446-60713-1, Pub Date 01 Feb 1999, Mass Market Paperback
- 1989, UK, Savannah Koch publisher, ISBN 978-0-9514464-0-9, Pub Date 5 August 1989, Hardcover
- 1994, UK, Bantam Books, London, ISBN 978-0-553-40791-4, Pub Date 28 July 1994, Paperback
- 2008, UK, Robinson Publishing, ISBN 978-1-84529-665-0, Pub Date 23 April 2008, Paperback
- 2013, UK, C & R Crime, ISBN 978-1-4721-0520-2, Pub Date 2013, Paperback
