= Castles in the Sky (film) =

- DVD cover art
- Genre: Factual; Drama
- Written by: Ian Kershaw
- Directed by: Gillies MacKinnon
- Starring: Eddie Izzard
- Composer: Mark Russell
- Country of origin: United Kingdom
- Original language: English

Production
- Producer: Simon Wheeler
- Cinematography: Alasdair Walker
- Production companies: Black Camel Pictures; Hero Productions

Original release
- Network: BBC Two
- Release: 4 September 2014

Castles in the Sky is a British fact-based television drama first broadcast on BBC Two on 4 September 2014. The movie shows Robert Watson-Watt and other British scientists' struggle to invent radar in the years leading to World War II.

== Plot ==
In the mid-1930s, Germany was making advances in weaponry, especially aircraft. Suspecting that a war was likely, the British War Ministry looked to new inventions of their own. This film charts the work of Robert Watson-Watt, the pioneer of radar, and his team of meteorologists as they abandon their initial direction to build a death ray and struggle to turn the concept of radar into a workable reality. Hamstrung by a small budget, technical problems and a spy, Watson-Watt also has to deal with his own marital problems. By 1939, Watson-Watt and his team have developed the world's first radar system and deployed it along England's southeast coast. In 1940, this system will prove critical in winning the Battle of Britain.

== Cast ==
- Eddie Izzard as Robert Watson-Watt
- Laura Fraser as Margaret Watson-Watt
- Alex Jennings as Henry Tizard
- Tim McInnerny as Winston Churchill
- David Hayman as Frederick Lindemann
- Julian Rhind-Tutt as Albert Percival Rowe
- Karl Davies as Arnold "Skip" Wilkins
- Celyn Jones as "Taffy" Bowen
- Iain McKee as Higgy
- Joe Bone as Bell

== Production ==
Castles in the Sky was commissioned by Janice Hadlow for BBC Two and Kim Shillinglaw, head commissioner for science and natural history. It was produced by Simon Wheeler for Hero Film and Television with Arabella Page Croft and Kieran Parker as co-producers for Black Camel Pictures. Gillies MacKinnon directed and Ian Kershaw was the writer who had worked on Shameless. Castles in the Sky was produced with the Open University, BBC Two, BBC Scotland, BBC Worldwide and Creative Scotland with Glasgow Film Office, Robert Watson Watt Trust and Brechin Civic Trust.

Locations on the east coast of Scotland were used as filming locations including, Dunbar Beach and Hedderwick Sands in East Lothian, Newbattle Abbey and Arniston House in Midlothian, Gosford House in Longniddry and in Edinburgh. Mark Russell composed the musical score, whilst the costume designer was Gill Horn. Wheeler said that he hoped the film would illuminate the "sex appeal" of science. He said, "The time is right for a contemporary approach to this rich and under-reported vein of British history—it's not like other war stories—if anything it's more akin to a combination of The Social Network and Chariots of Fire than The Dambusters or Reach for the Sky."

== Reception ==
The film was previewed at the Edinburgh Film Festival in June 2014. Variety took the view that there were "many ways in which 'Castles in the Sky' adheres timidly to biopic convention...from Mark Russell's sugary score to Gill Horn's elegant but unworn costumes. Watson-Watt may stress the importance of 'free thinkers, rule-breakers and men without ties,' but this tweedy portrait never undoes its top button." Andrew Pulver in The Guardian said that the film "has been framed as a rousing patriotic story, with a side-order of bash-the-establishment", having the humble Scot Watson-Watt and his team pitted against snobbish upper-crust figures: "to suit the we're-all-in-this-together mood, Watson-Watt's team are carefully pan-British, with Welsh and Yorkshire scientists in there too."

After the television broadcast, writing in The Daily Telegraph, Jake Wallis Simons said of the film, "The problem was that this was a story in which nothing very dramatic happened. A moment in history, however significant, doesn't automatically make a compelling piece of television." He added, "Izzard did his best, but neither story nor script worked in his favour.." concluding: "Overall, it all felt a bit worthy. This was history that everybody should know, but the erection of a statue might have done the job just as well."
