= Agatha Raisin =

- First appearance: Agatha Raisin and the Quiche of Death
- Created by: M. C. Beaton
- Portrayed by: Penelope Keith (Radio); Ashley Jensen (TV)

In-universe information
- Gender: Female
- Occupation: Public relations agent, amateur sleuth
- Family: Joseph Styles (father); Margaret Styles (mother)
- Spouses: Jimmy Raisin (murdered); James Lacey (divorced; on/off lover)
- Nationality: English

Agatha Raisin is a fictional detective in a series of humorous mystery novels, originally written by Marion Chesney using the pseudonym M. C. Beaton. Chesney's friend Rod W. Green took over as writer with Hot to Trot. The books are published in the U.K. by Constable & Robinson and in the US by St Martin's Press.

== Character ==
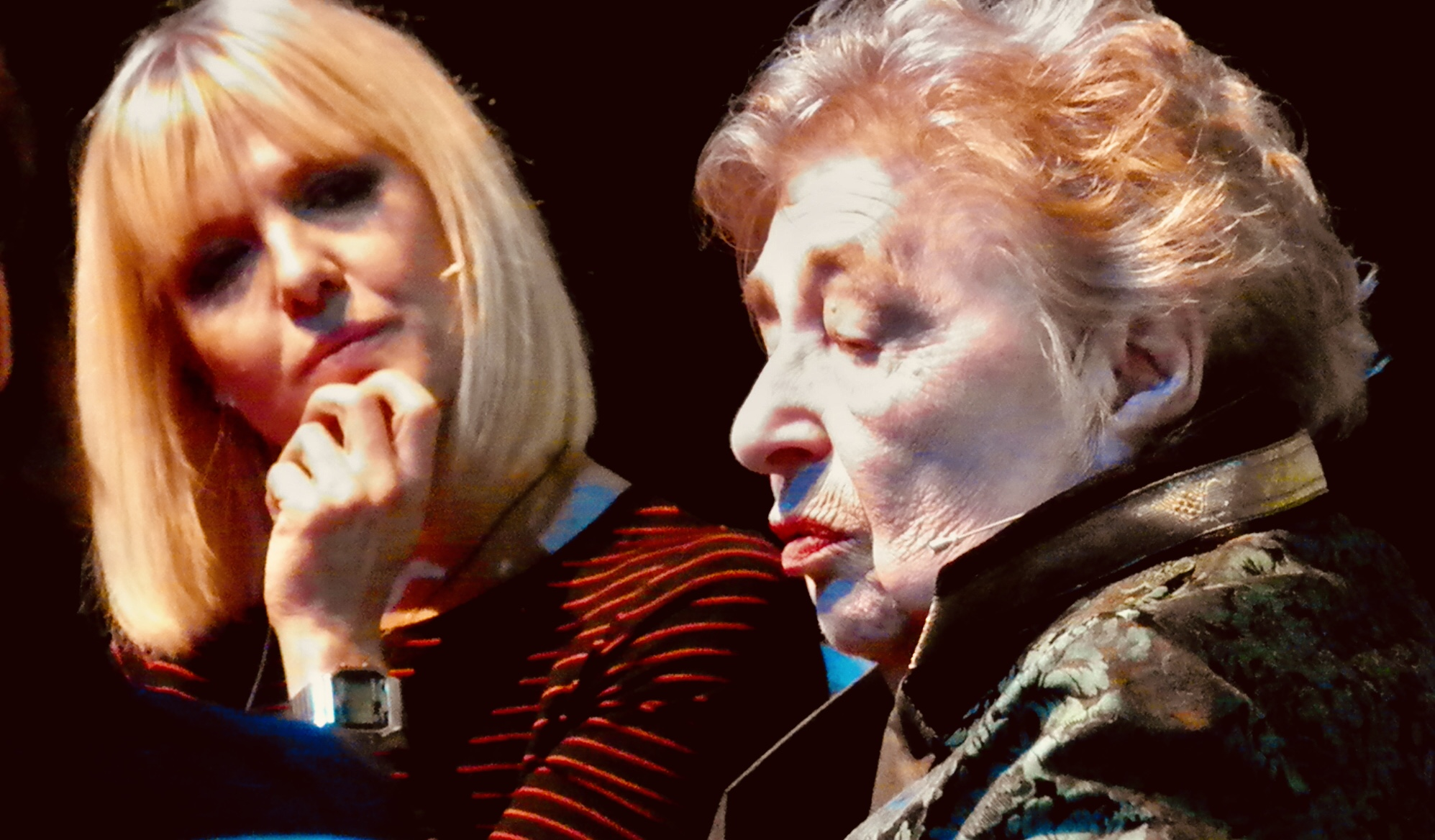
M.C. Beaton (right), author of the Agatha Raisin series, and Ashley Jensen, who portrayed Raisin in the TV series adaptation, at the Bloody Scotland festival in 2018.

Agatha Raisin is a frustrated, yet endearing, middle-aged former public-relations agent who moved from London to Carsely in the Cotswolds when she sold her public-relations firm in Mayfair and took early retirement. She solves murders in each of the earlier books, but in the fifteenth book Agatha Raisin and the Deadly Dance (2004) Agatha sets up her own detective agency. The police, and even some of her acquaintances, insist that she solves crimes through accident and luck.

In the first book, Agatha Raisin and the Quiche of Death (1992), Agatha is 53. (She remains 'in her early fifties' throughout the series, even in the novels set during the late 2000s / early 2010s recession.) She was born Agatha Styles in a tower-block slum in Birmingham to Joseph and Margaret Styles, both unemployed drunks living on benefits and occasional bouts of shoplifting. She went for one glorious week on a rare family vacation to the Cotswolds — her parents preferred going to a casino/holiday camp — and she never forgot that golden holiday nor the beauty of the countryside. Agatha went to the local comprehensive, then saved enough from her biscuit factory wages to run off to London. After an evening secretarial course she worked as a secretary in a public relations firm, moved into public relations work and saved enough to start her own company.

She lives in the village of Carsely, but her detective agency Raisin Investigations and the police headquarters where Bill Wong is based are in the nearby town of Mircester. Even though Carsely and Mircester are fictional, they are based on real places; she does, however, frequent Evesham, Moreton-in-Marsh, Stow-on-the-Wold, Chipping Campden and other nearby towns and villages quite often. Agatha's first case came when she moved to Carsely and heard about a quiche competition. She promptly bought a spinach quiche in London from a famous quiche shop and entered it as her own. She was outraged she did not win but later the judge, Reg Cummings-Browne, took another slice and died from cowbane poisoning. Frustrated, Agatha set out to find the poisoner and clear her own name.

Agatha's character in the TV series, as played by Ashley Jensen, is notably different from her depiction in the novels: she is less bitter and more vulnerable than the version in the books. Other characters from the novels and some of the relationships between them are also notably different in the TV series, making the cast more of an ensemble.

== Novels ==
1. Agatha Raisin and the Quiche of Death (1992)
2. Agatha Raisin and the Vicious Vet (1993)
3. Agatha Raisin and the Potted Gardener (1994)
4. Agatha Raisin and the Walkers of Dembley (1995)
5. Agatha Raisin and the Murderous Marriage (1996)
6. Agatha Raisin and the Terrible Tourist (1997)
7. Agatha Raisin and the Wellspring of Death (1998)
8. Agatha Raisin and the Wizard of Evesham (1999)
9. Agatha Raisin and the Witch of Wyckhadden (1999)
10. Agatha Raisin and the Fairies of Fryfam (2000)
11. Agatha Raisin and the Love from Hell (2001)
12. Agatha Raisin and the Day the Floods Came (2002)
13. Agatha Raisin and the Case of the Curious Curate (2003)
14. Agatha Raisin and the Haunted House (2003)
15. Agatha Raisin and the Deadly Dance (2004)
16. The Perfect Paragon: An Agatha Raisin Mystery (2005)
17. Love, Lies and Liquor: An Agatha Raisin Mystery (2006)
18. Kissing Christmas Goodbye: An Agatha Raisin Mystery (2007)
19. A Spoonful of Poison: An Agatha Raisin Mystery (2008)
20. There Goes the Bride: An Agatha Raisin Mystery (2009)
21. The Busy Body: An Agatha Raisin Mystery (2010)
22. As the Pig Turns: An Agatha Raisin Mystery (2011)
23. Hiss and Hers: An Agatha Raisin Mystery (2012)
24. Something Borrowed, Someone Dead: An Agatha Raisin Mystery (2013)
25. The Blood of an Englishman: An Agatha Raisin Mystery (2014)
26. Dishing the Dirt: An Agatha Raisin Mystery (2015)
27. Pushing Up Daisies: An Agatha Raisin Mystery (2016)
28. The Witches' Tree: An Agatha Raisin Mystery (2017)
29. The Dead Ringer: An Agatha Raisin Mystery (2018)
30. Beating About the Bush: An Agatha Raisin Mystery (2019)
31. Hot to Trot: An Agatha Raisin Mystery (2020)
32. Down the Hatch: An Agatha Raisin Mystery (October 2021)
33. Devil's Delight: An Agatha Raisin Mystery (October 2022)
34. Dead on Target: An Agatha Raisin Mystery (September 2023)
35. Killing Time: An Agatha Raisin Mystery (October 2024)
36. Sugar and Spite (October 2025)

== Short stories ==
1. Agatha Raisin and the Christmas Crumble (2012) - also published in the 10th anniversary paperback edition of The Perfect Paragon (2016).
2. Agatha Raisin: Hell's Bells (2013)
3. Agatha's First Case (2015)

== Recurring characters ==
- Bill Wong - policeman and friend; the first friend Agatha made after relocating to the Cotswolds from London. He has a series of unsuitable relationships. Luckily these are usually ended after introducing them to his parents (see below).
- James Lacey - neighbour and one-time husband with whom Agatha has an on-and-off romantic relationship and subsequent platonic friendship.
- Sir Charles Fraith - friend of Agatha's known for being stingy with his money and regularly uses her house like a hotel; has an on-off sexual relationship with her. As the stories go on they develop deeper feelings, unrealised by either of them.
- Mrs Sarah-Margaret (she answers to both) Bloxby - the vicar's wife who greatly admires Agatha and is always looking out for Agatha's best interests.
- Roy Silver - former co-worker from the public relations firm Agatha previously owned, he regularly visits and helps with some of the investigations.
- Miss Kylie Simms - Carsely's unmarried mother and secretary of the Ladies' Society.
- Toni Gilmour - hired detective at Agatha's agency, very beautiful, aged eighteen. Agatha is envious of her good looks.
- Phil Marshall - works with Agatha's agency. In his mid-70s. Is smart and fond of photography
- Patrick Mulligan - detective employed at Agatha's agency. Former policeman. Agatha frequently relies on his reaching out to his police connections to get news.
- Mrs Freedman - secretary at the detective agency
- Harry Beam - originally worked in Toni Gilmour's position but moved to University, has appeared in the past few books
- Simon Black - replaced Harry Beam, initially had a crush on Toni Gilmour. Subsequent crushes on any attractive woman. Known to lie about his personal life. Jealous of his coworkers.
- Doris Simpson - Agatha's ever-present cleaner and good friend, who looks after her cats Hodge and Boswell when she is away.
- Rev. Alf Bloxby - Vicar of Carsely with a unique disdain towards Agatha. Hates Agatha, even though she has helped him when he had a crisis of faith and also when he was accused of murder. Also dislikes many of his own parishioners.
- Mr and Mrs Wong - Bill Wong's parents. Mother is a native of Gloucestershire, whereas the Father is Hong Kong Chinese. The mother is an awful cook and they are both known to eat at bad restaurants. They are also known for an attraction to brash gaudy decor and chasing off Bill's love interests.

== Adaptations ==
Raisin has been played by Penelope Keith on BBC Radio 4 and by Ashley Jensen on Sky 1 in the television series Agatha Raisin. The TV pilot aired in December 2014. A full 8-part series, filmed during 2015, began airing on Sky 1 in June 2016. For series 2 the format was changed from 45-minute episodes to two 90-minute TV movies. Series 3 premiered on 28 October 2019 and the four stories retained the 90-minute format.

== See also ==
- Agatha Raisin (TV series)
