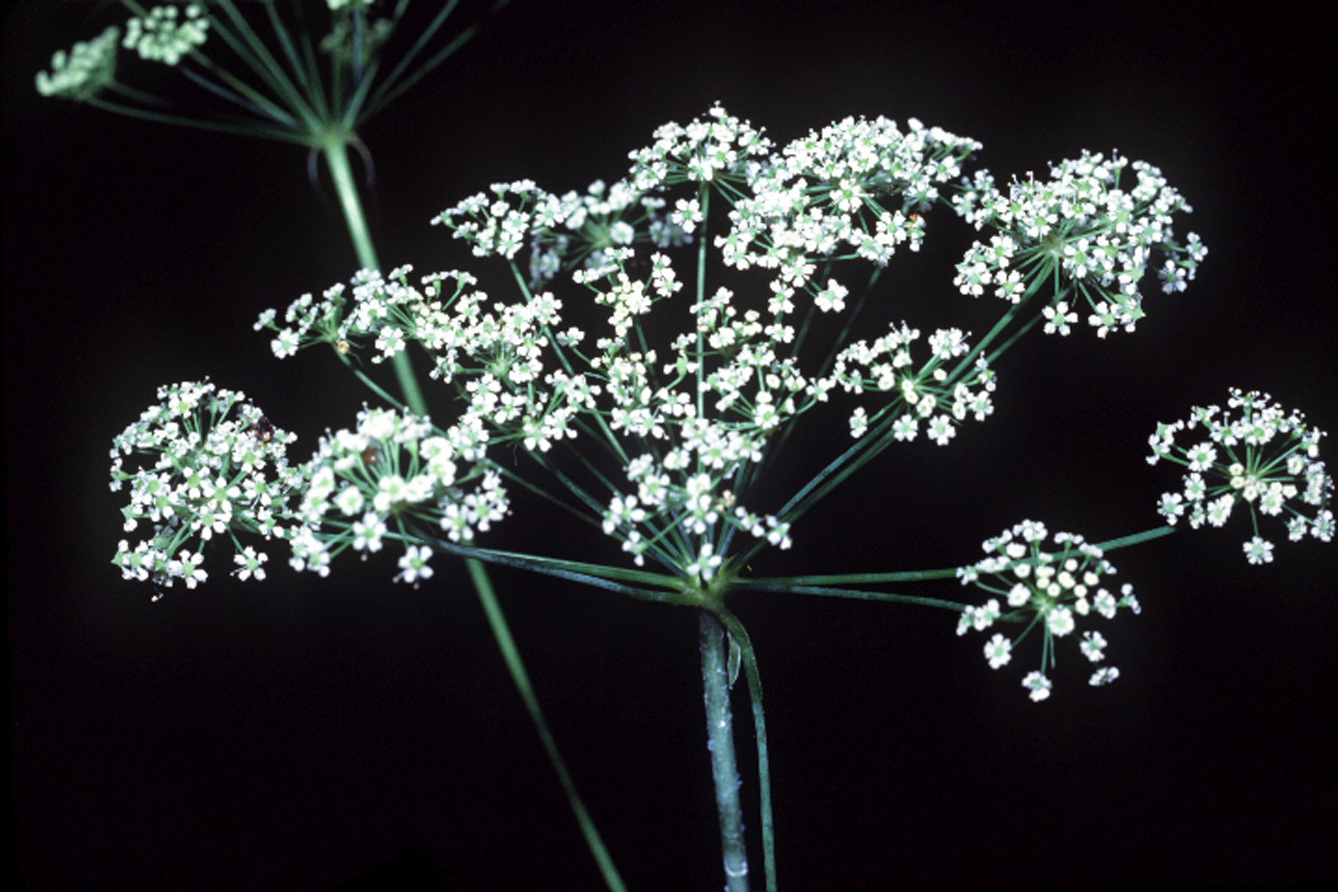
- Oxypolis rigidior

Scientific classification
- Kingdom: Plantae
- Clade: Tracheophytes
- Clade: Angiosperms
- Clade: Eudicots
- Clade: Asterids
- Order: Apiales
- Family: Apiaceae
- Subfamily: Apioideae
- Tribe: Oenantheae
- Genus: Oxypolis; Raf.

= Oxypolis =

Genus of flowering plants

Oxypolis is a small genus of North American flowering plants in the carrot family known as cowbane, water dropwort, dropwort, hog-fennel, and pig-potato. As of 2020, Kew's Plants of the World Online accepts four species in the genus Oxypolis:

- Oxypolis fendleri (A.Gray) A.Heller
- Oxypolis occidentalis J.M.Coult. & Rose
- Oxypolis rigidior (L.) Raf.
- Oxypolis ternata (Nutt.) A.Heller
