= Cameron Roach =

British television producer

Cameron Roach is a British television producer. He was the director of drama for Sky and he is the founder of the independent production company Rope Ladder Fiction. Credits include Footballers' Wives, Bad Girls, Casualty, Life on Mars, Silk, and I Hate Suzie.
