= Agatha Raisin and the Quiche of Death =

1992 novel by Marion Chesney

The Quiche of Death
- First edition
- Author: M. C. Beaton (Marion Chesney)
- Language: English
- Series: Agatha Raisin
- Genre: Detective, Mystery novel
- Publisher: St. Martin's Press
- Publication date: December 1992
- Publication place: United Kingdom
- Media type: Print (Hardcover)
- Pages: 201 (Hardcover edition)
- ISBN: 0-312-08153-7 (First Edition)
- OCLC: 26310715
- Dewey Decimal: 823/.914 20
- LC Class: PR6052.E196 A7 1992
- Followed by: Agatha Raisin and the Vicious Vet

The Quiche of Death (1992) is the first Agatha Raisin mystery novel by Marion Chesney under her pseudonym M. C. Beaton.

== Premise ==
Agatha Raisin retires from her profitable position as a PR agent in London and moves to the Cotswolds, expecting a peaceful country life. She enters a local baking contest with a quiche she bought in London; not only does she not win, but her quiche kills one of the judges. Desperate to prove her innocence, Agatha begins investigating the crime herself.
