= Marion Chesney =

British novelist (1936–2019)

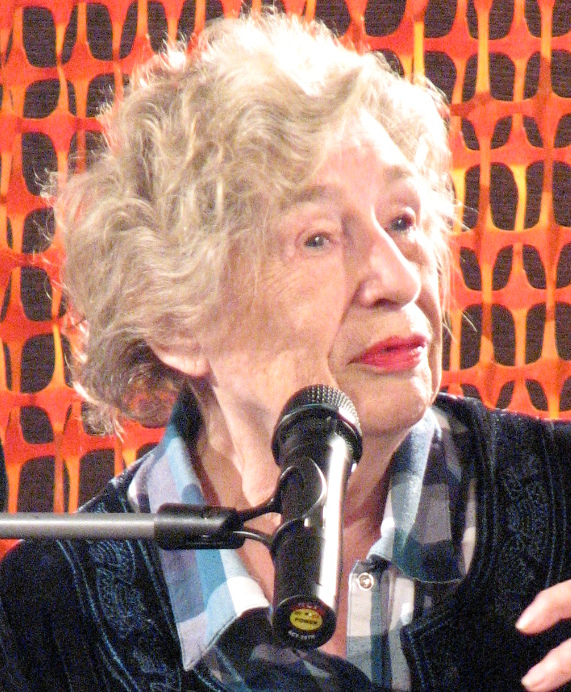
- Chesney in 2011
- Born: Marion McGowan Chesney; 10 June 1936; Glasgow, Scotland
- Died: 30/31 December 2019 (aged 83); Gloucester, England
- Occupation: Writer
- Spouse: Harry Scott Gibbons (m. 1969; died 2016)
- Children: Charles Gibbons
- Writing career
- Pen name: Ann Fairfax, Jennie Tremaine, Helen Crampton, Marion Chesney, Charlotte Ward, M. C. Beaton, Sarah Chester
- Language: English
- Period: 1979–2019
- Genres: Romance, mystery, historical
- Website: mcbeaton.com

Marion Gibbons (née Chesney; 10 June 1936 – 30/31 December 2019) was a Scottish writer of romance and mystery novels, whose career as a published author began in 1979. She wrote numerous successful historical romance novels under a form of her maiden name, Marion Chesney, including the "Travelling Matchmaker" and "Daughters of Mannerling" series.

Using the pseudonym M. C. Beaton, she also wrote many popular mystery novels, most notably the Agatha Raisin and Hamish Macbeth mystery series. Both of these book series have been adapted for TV. She also wrote romance novels under the pseudonyms Ann Fairfax, Jennie Tremaine, Helen Crampton, Charlotte Ward, and Sarah Chester.

Writing as Marion Chesney, her final endeavour was an Edwardian mystery series featuring Lady Rose Summer, a charming debutante with an independent streak, and Captain Harry Cathcart, an impoverished aristocrat. In an interview, she stated that she ceased writing the Edwardian series as a result of the pressure of writing for the Agatha Raisin and Hamish Macbeth series.

== Biography ==
Marion Chesney was born on 10 June 1936 in Glasgow, Scotland, and worked as a buyer of fiction for the Glasgow bookshop, John Smith & Son, before working at the Scottish Daily Express as a theatre critic, newspaper reporter, and editor. She married Express Middle East Correspondent Harry Scott Gibbons in 1969; they had a son, Charles. The couple moved to the Cotswolds when their son was about to go to university, assuming that he would go to Oxford, though in fact he did not.

Chesney had also lived in the USA. In later life, she divided her time between a cottage in the Cotswolds and Paris. She died at a hospital in Gloucester, England on 30 or 31 December 2019, at the age of 83.

Little Brown, Chesney's publisher at the time of her death, announced that before the author became ill, she continued to write and was working on new material for her beloved characters, Hamish Macbeth and Agatha Raisin.

== Bibliography ==
=== As Ann Fairfax ===
- My Dear Duchess (1979)
- Henrietta (1979)
- Annabelle (1980)
- Penelope (1982)

=== As Jennie Tremaine ===
- Kitty (1979)
- Daisy (1980)
- Lucy (1980)
- Polly (1980)
- Molly (1980)
- Ginny (1980)
- Tilly (1980)
- Susie (1981)
- Poppy (1982)
- Sally (1982)
- Maggie (1984)
- Lady Anne's Deception (1986)

=== As Helen Crampton ===
- The Marquis Takes a Bride (1980)
- Marriage a la Mode (1980)
- The Highland Countess (1981)

=== As Marion Chesney ===
==== Stand-alone novels ====
- Regency Gold (1980)
- Lady Margery's Intrigue (1980)
- The Constant Companion (1980)
- Quadrille (1981)
- My Lords, Ladies and Marjorie (1981)
- The Ghost and Lady Alice (1982)
- Love and Lady Lovelace (1982)
- Duke's Diamonds (1982)
- The Flirt (1985)
- At The Sign of the Golden Pineapple (1987)
- Miss Davenport's Christmas (1993)
- The Chocolate Debutante (1998)

(some of these books were re-published much later as part of other series, often as by "M. C. Beaton")

Those Endearing Young Charms

1. The French Affair (1984)
2. To Dream of Love (1986)
3. A Marriage of Inconvenience (1992)
4. A Governess of Distinction (1992)
5. The Glitter and the Gold (1993)
6. Duke's Diamonds (1982)
7. Those Endearing Young Charms (1986)

==== Westerby ====
1. The Westerby Inheritance (1982)
2. The Westerby Sisters (1982)

==== The Six Sisters ====
1. Minerva (1983)
2. The Taming of Annabelle (1983)
3. Deirdre and Desire (1984)
4. Daphne (1984)
5. Diana the Huntress (1985)
6. Frederica in Fashion (1985)

==== A House for the Season series ====
1. The Miser of Mayfair (1986)
2. Plain Jane (1986)
3. The Wicked Godmother (1987)
4. Rake's Progress (1987)
5. The Adventuress (1987)
6. Rainbird's Revenge (1988)

==== The School for Manners ====
1. Refining Felicity (1988)
2. Perfecting Fiona (1989)
3. Enlightening Delilah (1989)
4. Finessing Clarissa (1989)
5. Animating Maria (1990)
6. Marrying Harriet (1990)

==== Waverley Women ====
1. The First Rebellion (1989)
2. Silken Bonds (1989)
3. The Love Match (1990)

==== The Travelling Matchmaker ====
1. Emily Goes to Exeter (1990)
2. Belinda Goes to Bath (1991)
3. Penelope Goes to Portsmouth (1991)
4. Beatrice Goes to Brighton (1991)
5. Deborah Goes to Dover (1992)
6. Yvonne Goes to York (1992)

==== Poor relation ====
1. Lady Fortescue Steps Out (1993)
2. Miss Tonks Turns to Crime (1993) aka Miss Tonks Takes a Risk
3. Mrs. Budley Falls From Grace (1993)
4. Sir Philip's Folly (1993)
5. Colonel Sandhurst to the Rescue (1994)
6. Back in Society (1994)

==== The Daughters of Mannerling ====
1. The Banishment (1995)
2. The Intrigue (1995)
3. The Deception (1996)
4. The Folly (1996)
5. The Romance (1997)
6. The Homecoming (1997)

==== Edwardian Murder Mystery ====
1. Snobbery with Violence (2003)
2. Hasty Death (2004)
3. Sick of Shadows (2005)
4. Our Lady of Pain (2006)

=== As Charlotte Ward ===
- The Westerby Inheritance (1982)

=== As M. C. Beaton ===
==== Hamish Macbeth series ====
1. Death of a Gossip (1985)
2. Death of a Cad (1987)
3. Death of an Outsider (1988)
4. Death of a Perfect Wife (1989)
5. Death of a Hussy (1991)
6. Death of a Snob (1992)
7. Death of a Prankster (1992)
8. Death of a Glutton OR Death of a Greedy Woman (1993)
9. Death of a Travelling Man (1993)
10. Death of a Charming Man (1994)
11. Death of a Nag (1995)
12. Death of a Macho Man (1996)
13. Death of a Dentist (1997)
14. Death of a Scriptwriter (1998)
15. Death of an Addict (1999)
16. A Highland Christmas (2000)
17. Death of a Dustman (2001)
18. Death of a Celebrity (2002)
19. Death of a Village (2003)
20. Death of a Poison Pen (2004)
21. Death of a Bore (2005)
22. Death of a Dreamer (2006)
23. Death of a Maid (2007)
24. Death of a Gentle Lady (2008)
25. Death of a Witch (2009)
26. Death of a Valentine (2010)
27. Death of a Chimney Sweep (2011)
28. Death of a Kingfisher (2012)
29. Death of Yesterday (2013)
30. Death of a Policeman (2014)
31. Death of a Liar (2015)
32. Death of a Nurse (2016)
33. Death of a Ghost (2017)
34. Death of an Honest Man (2018)

Short Stories and Companion books:

- Knock, Knock, You're Dead, ebook short story (2016)
- Death of a Laird, ebook short story (2022, credited to "M. C. Beaton with R. W. Green")

Posthumous:

1. Death of a Green-Eyed Monster (2022, credited to "M. C. Beaton with R. W. Green")
2. Death of a Traitor (2023, credited to "M. C. Beaton with R. W. Green")

==== Agatha Raisin series ====
1. Agatha Raisin and the Quiche of Death (1992)
2. Agatha Raisin and the Vicious Vet (1993)
3. Agatha Raisin and the Potted Gardener (1994)
4. Agatha Raisin and the Walkers of Dembley (1995)
5. Agatha Raisin and the Murderous Marriage (1996)
6. Agatha Raisin and the Terrible Tourist (1997)
7. Agatha Raisin and the Wellspring of Death (1998)
8. Agatha Raisin and the Wizard of Evesham (1999)
9. Agatha Raisin and the Witch of Wyckhadden (1999)
10. Agatha Raisin and the Fairies of Fryfam (2000)
11. Agatha Raisin and the Love from Hell (2001)
12. Agatha Raisin and the Day the Floods Came (2002)
13. Agatha Raisin and the Case of the Curious Curate (2003)
14. Agatha Raisin and the Haunted House (2003)
15. Agatha Raisin and the Deadly Dance (2004)
16. Agatha Raisin and the Perfect Paragon (2005)
17. Love, Lies and Liquor: An Agatha Raisin Mystery (2006)
18. Agatha Raisin and Kissing Christmas Goodbye (2007)
19. A Spoonful of Poison: An Agatha Raisin Mystery (2008)
20. Agatha Raisin: There Goes The Bride (2009)
21. Busy Body: An Agatha Raisin Mystery (2010)
22. As the Pig Turns: An Agatha Raisin Mystery (2011)
23. Hiss and Hers (2012)
24. Something Borrowed, Someone Dead: An Agatha Raisin Mystery (2013)
25. The Blood of an Englishman (2014)
26. Dishing the Dirt (2015)
27. Pushing up daisies (2016)
28. The Witches' Tree (2017)
29. The Dead Ringer (2018)
30. Beating About the Bush (2019)

Short stories and related works:

1. Agatha Raisin and the Christmas Crumble (2012)
2. Hell's Bells (2013)
3. Agatha's First Case (2015)
4. The Agatha Raisin Companion (2010) with introduction by M. C. Beaton.

Posthumous (credited to "M. C. Beaton with R. W. Green"):

1. Hot to Trot (2020)
2. Down the Hatch (2021)
3. Devil's Delight (2022)
4. Dead on Target (2023)
5. Killing Time (2024)
6. Sugar and Spite (2025)
7. Dead Before Tea Time (2026)

==== Stand-alone novels ====
- The Education of Miss Patterson (1985)
- Ms. Davenport's Christmas (1993)
- The Skeleton in the Closet (2001)

=== As Sarah Chester ===
- Dancing on the Wind (1988)
