= 1955 Birthday Honours =

British government recognitions

The Queen's Birthday Honours 1955 were appointments in many of the Commonwealth realms of Queen Elizabeth II to various orders and honours to reward and highlight good works by citizens of those countries. The appointments were made to celebrate the official birthday of The Queen.

They were announced on 3 June 1955, for the United Kingdom and Colonies, Australia, New Zealand, Ceylon, Pakistan, and for various members of Commonwealth forces in recognition of services in Korea during 1954–1955.

The recipients of honours are displayed here as they were styled before their new honour, and arranged by honour, with classes (Knight, Knight Grand Cross, etc.) and then divisions (Military, Civil, etc.) as appropriate.

== United Kingdom and Colonies ==
=== Baron ===
- The Right Honourable Ralph Assheton, Member of Parliament for the Rushcliffe Division, 1934–1945, City of London, 1945–1950, and Blackburn West, 1950–1955; Parliamentary Secretary, Ministry of Labour & National Service, 1939–1942, and Ministry of Supply 1942–1943; Financial Secretary, HM Treasury, 1943–1944; Chairman, Conservative and Unionist Party Organisation, 1944–1946. For political and public services.
- Sir Geoffrey Heyworth, chairman, Unilever Ltd. For public services.
- The Right Honourable Malcolm Stewart McCorquodale, Member of Parliament for Sowerby, 1931–1945, and Epsom, 1947–1955; Joint Parliamentary Secretary, Ministry of Labour & National Service, 1942–1945. For political and public services.
- Sir Arnold Duncan McNair, CBE, QC, lately President and United Kingdom Judge, International Court of Justice at The Hague.

=== Privy Counsellors ===
- Henry Brooke, MP, Member of Parliament for West Lewisham, 1938–1945, and Hampstead since 1950; Financial Secretary, HM Treasury since 1954; Leader of Conservative Party on London County Council, 1945–1952.
- Robert Hugh Turton, MC, MP, Member of Parliament for Thirsk and Malton since 1929; Parliamentary Secretary, Ministry of National Insurance, 1951–1953; Joint Parliamentary Secretary, Ministry of Pensions & National Insurance, 1953–1954; Joint Parliamentary Under Secretary of State for Foreign Affairs since 1954.

=== Baronet ===
- Sir Robert Archibald Cary, MP, Member of Parliament for Eccles, 1935–1945, and Withington Division of Manchester since 1951; a Government Whip, 1944–1945, and a Lord Commissioner of HM Treasury, 1945. For political and public services.
- Sir George Horatio Nelson, chairman and managing director, The English Electric Co. Ltd., London.
- William McNair Snadden, JP, Member of Parliament for Kinross and West Perth, 1938–1955; Joint Parliamentary Under-Secretary of State for Scotland, 1951–1955.
- His Honour George Clark Williams, QC. For public services in Carmarthenshire.

=== Knight Bachelor ===
- George Harold Banwell, Secretary, Association of Municipal Corporations.
- Harold Bishop, CBE, Director of Technical Services, British Broadcasting Corporation.
- Professor William Moir Calder. For services to Greek Scholarship.
- William Wiggins Cocker, OBE, JP. For political and public services in Lancashire.
- John Montagu Craster, JP. For political and public services in Northumberland.
- George Harold Curtis, CB, Chief Land Registrar.
- John Carmichael Denholm, CBE, President, Chamber of Shipping of the United Kingdom.
- Colonel Thomas Charles Dunlop, TD, DL. For political and public services in Ayrshire.
- Francis Alfred Enever, CB, MC, Deputy Treasury Solicitor.
- Robert Charles Kirkwood Ensor, Writer.
- Benjamin Ifor Evans, Provost of University College London.
- Alderman Frank Savin Foster, CBE, JP. For political and public services in Essex.
- Lieutenant-Colonel Oswald Bissill Giles, DL. For political and public services in the Parts of Holland, Lincolnshire.
- Ronald Gould, General Secretary, National Union of Teachers.
- Hugh Rupert Granger, chairman and managing director, Duke's Grain Warehousing Co. Ltd.
- Albert William Grant, CBE, chairman, Engineering and Allied Employers' West of England Association.
- Archibald Frederick Harrison, CBE, Solicitor, Ministry of Labour & National Service.
- Lieutenant-Colonel Robert Humphrey Haslam, OBE, DL. For political and public services in Hertfordshire.
- Wing-Commander Norman John Hulbert, DL, MP, Member of Parliament for Stockport, 1935–1950, and for North Stockport since 1950. For political and public services.
- Geoffrey Langdon Keynes, MD, FRCS, Consulting Surgeon, St Bartholomew's Hospital.
- Ivison Stevenson Macadam, CVO, CBE, Director-General of the Royal Institute of International Affairs.
- Major Duncan McCallum, MC, MP Member of Parliament for Argyllshire since 1940. For political and public services.
- Robert Henry Maconochie, OBE, QC, Sheriff of Stirling, Dunbarton and Clackmannan.
- Richard Hope Miller. For political and public services in Knutsford.
- Robert Minshull Shone, CBE, Executive Member, Iron & Steel Board.
- William Arthur Steward, MP, Member of Parliament for Woolwich West since 1950; chairman, Select Committee of House of Commons on Kitchen and Refreshment Rooms, since 1951. For political and public services.
- Robert Sproul Stewart, CBE. For political services in Scotland.
- Alderman Edmund Villiers Minshull Stockdale, JP, lately Sheriff, City of London.
- Captain Cyril Ivan Thompson, Commodore Captain, SS Queen Elizabeth, Cunard Steam-Ship Co. Ltd.
- Geoffrey Stewart Tomkinson, OBE, MC, JP. For political and public services in Kidderminster.
- James Milliard Tucker, QC, Vice-chairman, Royal Commission on Taxation of Profits and Income.
- Sydney Vernon. For public services in Birmingham.
- Hugh Edmund Watts, CB, MBE, GM, lately HM Chief Inspector of Explosives, Home Office.
- William Emrys Williams, CBE, Secretary-General, Arts Council of Great Britain.

State of South Australia

- Darcy Rivers Warren Cowan, MB, BS, a prominent physician in the State of South Australia.

Commonwealth Services

- George Mason Mackinlay, President of the Bengal Chamber of Commerce & Industry, and the Associated Chambers of Commerce of India, 1954–1955.

Oversea Territories

- William Alexander Bustamante. For public services in Jamaica.
- Hampden Archibald Cuke, CBE. For public services in Barbados.
- Patrick Herbert Fitz-Gerald, OBE. For public services in the Gold Coast.
- John Bowes Griffin, QC, Chief Justice of Uganda.
- Tayabali Hassanali Alibhoy Karimjee. For public services in Zanzibar.
- John Smith Moffat, OBE. For public services in Northern Rhodesia.
- Joseph Leon Mathieu-Perez, QC, Chief Justice of Trinidad and Tobago.
- George Gilmour Robinson, Chief Justice of Zanzibar.
- Harold Ernest Robinson. For public services in Trinidad.
- Hannibal Publius Scicluna, MBE. For public services in Malta.
- Ernest Emmanuel Clough Thuraisingham, CBE, JP. For public services in the Federation of Malaya.
- Rukirabasaija Agutamba Tito Gafabusa Winyi IV, CBE, Omukama of Bunyoro-Kitara, Uganda.

=== Order of the Bath ===
==== Knight Grand Cross of the Order of the Bath (GCB) ====
Military Division

- Admiral the Right Honourable Louis Francis Albert Victor Nicholas, Earl Mountbatten of Burma, KG, GCSI, GCIE, GCVO, KCB, DSO.
- General Sir George Watkin Eben James Erskine, KCB, KBE, DSO (15806), late Infantry.
- General Sir Gerald Walter Robert Templer, GCMG, KCB, KBE, DSO (15307), late Infantry Colonel, The Royal Irish Fusiliers.

==== Knight Commander of the Order of the Bath (KCB) ====
Military Division

Royal Navy

- Vice-Admiral Frederick Robertson Parham, CB, CBE, DSO.
- Vice-Admiral Alan Kenneth Scott-Moncrieff, CB, CBE, DSO.

Army

- Lieutenant-General Sir Colin Bishop Callander, KBE, CB, MC (10503), late Infantry Colonel, The Royal Leicestershire Regiment.
- Lieutenant-General Cecil Stanway Sugden, CB, CBE (27005), late Corps of Royal Engineers.

Royal Air Force

- Air Marshal Thomas Geoffrey Pike, CB, CBE, DFC.
- Acting Air Marshal Bryan Vernon Reynolds, CB, CBE.
- Air Vice-Marshal George Robert Beamish, CB, CBE.

Civil Division

- Sir John Alexander Charles, MD, FRCP, Chief Medical Officer, Ministry of Health, Ministry of Education and Home Office.
- George Phillips Coldstream, CB, Clerk of the Crown in Chancery and, Permanent Secretary to the Lord Chancellor.
- Frank Cyril Musgrave, CB, Second Permanent Secretary, Ministry of Supply.

==== Companion of the Order of the Bath (CB) ====
Military Division

Royal Navy

- Rear-Admiral Laurence Arthur Boutwood, OBE.
- Engineer Rear-Admiral John Ernest Cooke.
- Rear-Admiral Leonard Francis Dunford-Slater.
- Rear-Admiral John Dudley Nelson Ham.
- Rear-Admiral Christopher Theodore Jellicoe, DSO, DSC.
- Rear-Admiral Manley Lawrence Power, CBE, DSO.
- Surgeon Rear-Admiral Seymour Grome Rainsford, MD, DSc.
- Rear-Admiral William Halford Selby, DSC.
- Rear-Admiral Ernest Henry Shattock, OBE.
- Rear-Admiral Guy Willoughby.

Army

- Major-General Eric Gilmour Brown, CBE (18643), Royal Army Ordnance Corps.
- Major-General Kenneth Christie Cooper, DSO, OBE (27871), late Royal Tank Regiment, Royal Armoured Corps.
- Major-General Philip Le Marchant Stonhouse Stonhouse-Gostling, CBE (12039), late Royal Regiment of Artillery (now RARO).
- Major-General Basil Perronet Hughes, CBE (26978), late Royal Regiment of Artillery.
- Major-General Robert Charles Moss King, DSO, OBE (28105), late Infantry.
- Brigadier Gilbert Reader McMeekan, DSO, OBE (22955), late Corps of Royal Engineers (now RARO).
- Major-General Frederick David Moore, CBE (23670), late Royal Regiment of Artillery.
- Major-General Albert Sachs, CBE, QHP, MD, MRCP (36785), late Royal Army Medical Corps.
- Brigadier and Chief Paymaster Ernest Thomas Cobley Smith, CBE (12906), Royal Army Pay Corps.
- Major-General John Wren, CBE, QHDS, FDS (5532), late Royal Army Dental Corps (now retired).

Royal Air Force

- Air Vice-Marshal John Goodenough Elton, CBE, DFC, AFC.
- Air Vice-Marshal Alan David Gillmore, CBE.
- Acting Air Vice-Marshal Paul Sandland Blockey, CBE.
- Acting Air Vice-Marshal William Alfred Opie, CBE.
- Air Commodore Thomas Charles Dickens, CBE.
- Air Commodore Henry Algernon Vickers Hogan, DFC.
- Air Commodore Ronald Lancelot Phillips, CBE.
- Air Commodore William Edward Victor Richards, CBE.
- Group Captain Kenneth Walter Godfrey, CBE, Royal Air Force Regiment.

Civil Division

- Reginald John Ayres, CBE, Accountant General, Ministry of Fuel & Power.
- Brigadier Edward Roy Caffyn, CBE, TD, chairman, County of Sussex Territorial and Auxiliary Forces Association.
- Walter Eric Chiesman, MD, FRCP, Medical Adviser, HM Treasury.
- John Rupert Colville, CVO, lately Joint Principal Private Secretary to the Right Honourable Sir Winston Churchill, KG, DM, CH, MP.
- Colonel George Reginald Curtis, OBE, TD, DL, chairman, Hampshire and the Isle of Wight Territorial and Auxiliary Forces Association.
- George William Hoggan Gardner, CBE, Director-General of Technical Development (Air), Ministry of Supply.
- Douglas John Gordon, Clerk Assistant, House of Commons.
- Thomas Douglas Haddow, Under-Secretary, Department of Health for Scotland.
- John Lawson, Under-Secretary, Admiralty.
- John Leckie, Under-Secretary, Board of Trade.
- Francis William Walker McCombe, CBE, Chief Charity Commissioner.
- Alan Samuel Marre, Accountant General, Ministry of Health.
- George Richard Parsons, CBE, Director of Establishments and Organisation, General Post Office.
- David Bruce Pitblado, CVO, Principal Private Secretary to the Prime Minister.
- John Neish Ritchie, Chief Veterinary Officer, Ministry of Agriculture, Fisheries & Food.
- Sir (Horace) Anthony Claude Rumbold, Bt, CMG, Principal Private Secretary to the Secretary of State for Foreign Affairs.
- Edward Kennedy Stopford, Assistant Under-Secretary of State, War Office.
- Norman Charles Wright, Chief Scientific Adviser, Ministry of Agriculture, Fisheries & Food.

=== Order of Saint Michael and Saint George ===
==== Knight Grand Cross of the Order of St Michael and St George (GCMG) ====
- Sir Esler Maberly Dening, KCMG, OBE, Her Majesty's Ambassador Extraordinary and Plenipotentiary in Tokyo.

==== Knight Commander of the Order of St Michael and St George (KCMG) ====
- Edgar Abraham Cohen, CMG, Second Secretary, Board of Trade.
- Alexander Colin Burlington Symon, CMG, OBE, High Commissioner in Pakistan for Her Majesty's Government in the United Kingdom.
- Robert Brown Black, CMG, OBE, Governor and Commander-in-Chief (designate), Singapore.
- Sir Clement John Pleass, KBE, CMG, Governor, Eastern Region, Nigeria.
- Roderick Edward Barclay, CMG, CVO, Deputy Under-Secretary of State, Foreign Office.
- Bernard Alexander Brocas Burrows, CMG, Political Resident in the Persian Gulf.
- Berkeley Everard Foley Gage, CMG, Her Majesty's Ambassador Extraordinary and Plenipotentiary in Bangkok.
- Humphrey Trevelyan, CMG, CIE, OBE, lately Chargé d'affaires ad interim at Her Majesty's Embassy in Peking.

==== Companion of the Order of St Michael and St George (CMG) ====
- Arthur Harold Clough, OBE, Member of the United Kingdom Delegation to the United Nations.
- Walter Ernest Knox, MM, Secretary, Export Credits Guarantee Department.
- John Moore Caldicott, Minister of Agriculture and Minister of Health, Federation of Rhodesia and Nyasaland.
- Harold Graydon Conde, Chairman of the Electricity Commission, State of New South Wales.
- Julian Randall Dridan, Engineer-in Chief, Engineering and Water Supply Department, State of South Australia.
- Alexander Francis Morley, CBE, an Assistant Under-Secretary of State in the Commonwealth Relations Office.
- Archibald Richard Park, Lord Mayor of the City of Hobart, State of Tasmania.
- Michael Louis Bernacchi, OBE, Resident Commissioner, Gilbert and Ellice Islands Colony.
- Ian William Blelloch, British Adviser, Perak, Federation of Malaya.
- Lachlan Macpherson Boyd, Secretary for African Affairs, Uganda.
- Hablot Robert Edgar Browne, OBE, Civil Secretary, Northern Region, Nigeria.
- Alexander Edward Cook, Permanent Secretary, Ministry of Finance, Eastern Region, Nigeria.
- Thomas Richard Fisher Cox, Provincial Commissioner, Uganda.
- John Hugh Ellis, Deputy Chief Secretary, Sarawak.
- Richard Percy Errington, Chairman of the Aden Port Trust.
- Albert Gomes, Minister of Labour, Industry and Commerce, Trinidad.
- Ralph Francis Alnwick Grey, OBE, Secretary to the Governor-General and Council of Ministers, Federation of Nigeria.
- Lieutenant-Commander James Jolly, CBE, RD, RNR (Retd), Director of Marine, Hong Kong.
- Frederick Herbert Page-Jones, Member for Local Government, Tanganyika.
- Richard Wildman Kettlewell, Director of Agriculture, Nyasaland.
- Leslie Frank Leversedge, Development Secretary, Northern Rhodesia.
- John Ewart Marnham, MC, TD, Assistant Secretary, Colonial Office.
- William Allan Cunningham Mathieson, MBE, Assistant Secretary, Colonial Office.
- Arthur George Rixson Mooring, Permanent Secretary, Ministry of Finance, Western Region, Nigeria.
- Eric George Rowe, Senior Provincial Commissioner, Tanganyika.
- James Stewart Smith, Senior Resident, Owerri Province, Eastern Region, Nigeria.
- Robert de Stapeldon Stapledon, CBE, Chief Secretary, Tanganyika.
- John Henry Wallace, Commissioner for Northern Rhodesia in the United Kingdom.
- Richard Ashton Beaumont, OBE, Counsellor at Her Majesty's Embassy in Baghdad.
- Thomas Eardley Bromley, Foreign Office.
- Leslie Alfred Charles Fry, OBE, Foreign Office.
- Frederick Herbert Gamble, Her Majesty's Ambassador Extraordinary and Plenipotentiary in Quito.
- Terence Willcocks Garvey, Counsellor at Her Majesty's Embassy in Cairo.
- Arthur Maxwell Hankin, lately Personnel Adviser to the Permanent Under-Secretary of the Ministry of Finance, Sudan Government.
- Anthony Edward Lambert, Counsellor at Her Majesty's Embassy in Athens.
- Humphrey Alan Walter Morrice, Irrigation Adviser and Director of Irrigation, Sudan Government.
- Edward Michael Rose, lately Deputy to the General Officer Commanding and Head of Political Division, Berlin (British Sector).
- John Lanham Bradbury Titchener, OBE, Counsellor (Economic) at Her Majesty's Embassy in Tehran.
- Archibald Duncan Wilson, Foreign Office.
- George Kennedy Young, MBE, Foreign Office.

=== Royal Victorian Order ===
==== Knight Grand Cross of the Royal Victorian Order (GCVO) ====
- Sir Horace Evans, KCVO, MD, FRCP.

==== Dame Grand Cross of the Royal Victorian Order (GCVO) ====
- The Most Noble Mary Alice, Duchess of Devonshire, CBE.

==== Knight Commander of the Royal Victorian Order (KCVO) ====
- Major John Crocker Bulteel, DSO, MC.
- Eric Humphrey Savill, CVO, CBE, MC.
- The Right Reverend and Right Honourable John William Charles Wand, Bishop of London.

==== Commander of the Royal Victorian Order (CVO) ====
- Vice-Admiral Thomas Bernard Drew, CB, OBE.
- Henry George Rushbury.

==== Member of the Royal Victorian Order, 4th class (MVO) ====
- Commander Anthony Dunhill, Royal Navy.
- The Reverend Peter Llewellyn Gillingham.
- Lieutenant (S) Kenneth Hall, MVO, MBE, Royal Navy (Retd.)
- Alec Hobson, OBE.
- Lieutenant-Colonel William Hilgrove Leslie McCarthy, DSO, MC, MD, MRCP.
- Francis Kennedy Bryden Murdoch, MBE, TD.
- Louis Albert Nickolls.
- Arthur William Peterson.
- Kenneth William Upjohn.
- Captain Thomas Wright, MRCVS.

==== Member of the Royal Victorian Order, 5th class (MVO) ====
- Frederick Charles Burke.
- Derek Charles Dashfield.
- Lillie Hocking.
- Hugh Brown Mounsey.
- Andrew Naysmith.
- Percy Randall.
- Herbert William Taffs, MBE.
- Patricia Thomas.

=== Order of the British Empire ===
==== Knight Grand Cross of the Order of the British Empire (GBE) ====
Civil Division

- Sir William Edward Rootes, KBE, chairman, Dollar Exports Council.

==== Knight Commander of the Order of the British Empire (KBE) ====
Military Division

Royal Navy

- Vice-Admiral Ian Murray Robertson Campbell, CB, DSO.
- Vice-Admiral Peter Grenville Lyon Cazalet, CB, DSO, DSC.

Army

- Brigadier Henry Shapcott, CB, CBE, MC (26224), Army Legal Services Staff List.
- Major-General George Alexander Neville Swiney, CB, CBE, MC (10754), Royal Army Ordnance Corps, Colonel Commandant, Royal Army Ordnance Corps (now RARO).

Royal Air Force

- Air Marshal Francis Joseph Fressanges, CB.

Civil Division

- Sir George Mowlem Burt, President, Federation of Civil Engineering Contractors.
- Edmund Gerald Compton, CB, Third Secretary, HM Treasury.
- Alexander Fleck, chairman, Imperial Chemical Industries Ltd. For services to the Ministry of Fuel & Power.
- Arthur Hulin Gosling, CB, Director General, Forestry Commission.
- Sir Harold Spencer Jones, MBE, Astronomer Royal.
- Sir Alexander Stuart Murray MacGregor, OBE, MD, FRFPS, JP. For services to public health in Scotland.
- Sir Harold Parkinson, OBE, Vice-chairman, National Savings Committee.
- Dick Goldsmith White, CBE, attached War Office.
- William O'Brien Lindsay, lately Chief Justice of the Sudan.
- Ernest William Meiklereid, CMG, Minister (Commercial) at Her Majesty's Embassy in Paris.
- William Addis, CMG, Governor and Commander-in-Chief, Seychelles.

Honorary Knight Commander

- Dato Setia Wangsa Mahmud bin Mat, CMG, OBE, Speaker, Federal Legislative Council, Federation of Malaya.

==== Dame Commander of the Order of the British Empire (DBE) ====
Civil Division

- Irene Mary Bewick Ward, CBE, JP, MP, Member of Parliament for Wallsend-on-Tyne, 1931–1945, and for Tynemouth since 1950. For political and public services.

==== Commander of the Order of the British Empire (CBE) ====
Military Division

Royal Navy

- Captain William Power Carne, (Retd.)
- Captain Michael Everard.
- Colonel Adolphus John Harvey, OBE, Royal Marines.
- Captain Arthur Trestain Phillips.

Army

- Brigadier (temporary) Alan Ward Brown, DSO, MC (44827), late Royal Tank Regiment, Royal Armoured Corps.
- Colonel (acting) Arthur Alexander Ernest Merlott-Chitty, DSO (8414), Army Cadet Force.
- Brigadier Allen Lepard Crockford, DSO, OBE, MC, TD, QHS, MB (40934), late Royal Army Medical Corps, Territorial Army.
- Colonel Charles Dalby (34225), late Infantry.
- Brigadier Averell John Daniell, DSO, MBE (26961), late Royal Regiment of Artillery.
- Brigadier Alexander Frederic Joseph Elmslie (31922), late Royal Army Service Corps.
- Colonel (local) (now Lieutenant-Colonel (temporary)) Peter Godfrey-Faussett, OBE (128925), Corps of Royal Military Police.
- Brigadier Geoffrey Bernard Sylvester Hindley, OBE (26976), late Royal Regiment of Artillery.
- Brigadier (acting) Alan Harvey Jones, TD (57861), late Royal Regiment of Artillery, Territorial Army.
- Brigadier Clarence Kirk, OBE (42184), late Corps of Royal Engineers.
- Brigadier (temporary) Geoffrey Franklyn Lushington, OBE (41141), late Royal Regiment of Artillery.
- Colonel Arthur Selby Milner, OBE (34688), late Royal Corps of Signals.
- Colonel William Paul Temple Roberts (38423), late Royal Regiment of Artillery.
- Brigadier (temporary) Anthony Donald Macdonald Teacher, OBE (33372), late Royal Regiment of Artillery.
- Colonel Robert Cecile Thomson (34995), late Infantry.
- Brigadier (temporary) Edward Dacre Howard-Vyse, MC (33342), late Royal Regiment of Artillery.
- Brigadier (acting) Ian Hamilton Reeve (IA.812), Special List (ex-Indian Army); until recently on loan to the Government of India.

Royal Air Force

- Air Commodore Albert Frederick Cook, OBE, LRCP&S.
- Air Commodore Henry Rudolph Graham, DSO, DFC.
- Group Captain Donald David Christie, OBE, AFC.
- Group Captain Stephen Peirson Hagger.
- Group Captain Sydney Herbert Verder Harris.
- Group Captain Andrew Blair Holloway, OBE.
- Group Captain Sidney Weetman Rochford Hughes, OBE, AFC.
- Group Captain John Malcolm Douglas KER.
- Group Captain William Ivan Guy Kerby, OBE.
- Group Captain Waters Eveleigh Rankin, DSO.
- Group Captain Frederick Ernest Rosier, DSO, OBE.

Civil Division

- Edgar Montague Amphlett, MC, Member, National Advisory Council on the Employment of the Disabled.
- William Henry Arnold, HM Attorney General, Guernsey.
- Alderman Albert Ballard, chairman, Board of Governors, United Sheffield Hospitals.
- Roger Gilbert Bannister, MRCS, LRCP. For services to amateur athletics.
- Godwin Edward Banwell, OBE, MC, Chief Constable, Cheshire Constabulary.
- George Edward Birkenshaw, managing director, David Dixon & Son Ltd., Leeds.
- Arthur Blackman, JP. For public services in Hastings.
- Eric Walter Blom. For services to Music.
- John Brown, MBE, MC, Education Officer, London County Council.
- Captain William Anthony Brown. For political and public services in Sevenoaks.
- William Bertram Brown, Divisional Inspector of Mines, East Midland Division, Ministry of Fuel & Power.
- Edwin Butler, Senior Engineering Inspector, Welsh Office, Ministry of Housing & Local Government.
- Philippe Leslie Caro Carrier, MD, MRCP, Senior Medical Officer, Home Office.
- Arnold Blatchford David Cassie, Director of Research, Wool Industries Research Association.
- Reginald Percy Chester, JP, chairman, Hampshire Agricultural Executive Committee.
- Albert Edward Childs, Director of Chemical Defence Research and Development, Ministry of Supply.
- Guy Chipperfield, chairman, British Oil & Cake Mills Ltd.
- Robert Hugh Clay, MC, Director of the Post Office, Northern Ireland.
- Henry William Clements, Manager Director, United Dairies Ltd.
- Keppel Archibald Cameron Creswell, MBE. For services to the study of Muslim architecture and archaeology.
- Percy John Curtis, Secretary, Exchequer and Audit Department.
- Helen Darbishire. For services to the study of English literature.
- Major Cecil Reginald Dibben, OBE, chairman, Midland Regional Board for Industry.
- John Vernon Dunworth, Head of Reactor Physics Division, Atomic Energy Research Establishment, Harwell.
- Clare Hankinson Dutton, Vice-chairman, Rotax Ltd., London.
- James Alistair Dyson, Director of Costings, Ministry of Agriculture, Fisheries & Food.
- Charles William Atkinson Emery, MB, ChB, Principal Medical Officer, Ministry of Pensions & National Insurance.
- Mary Esslemont, MB, ChB, JP. For services to Medicine in Scotland.
- Norman William Farmer. For political and public services in Lewisham.
- Lieutenant-Colonel William Dudley Henry Charles Forbes, DL. For political and public services in Scotland.
- Geoffrey Edwin Foxwell, Consulting Fuel Technologist.
- Richard William Lewis Gawn, OBE, assistant director of Naval Construction; Superintendent, Admiralty Experimental Works, Haslar.
- John Douglas Geake, Deputy Controller of Death Duties, Board of Inland Revenue.
- Reginald George Gosling, JP, chairman, Welwyn Garden City and Hatfield New Town Development Corporations.
- The Reverend Professor John Macdonald Graham, lately Lord Provost of Aberdeen.
- Lawrence Edward Greener, Assistant Secretary, Board of Customs & Excise.
- Hugh Kinghorn Grey, ISO, MBE, Head of Communications Department, Foreign Office.
- Vernon William Grosvenor, JP, chairman, Birmingham Regional Hospital Board.
- Brigadier Ivor Reginald Grove, OBE, Member of the Board and Technical Adviser, Army Kinema Corporation.
- Alec Guinness, Actor.
- Ernest Edward Hall, Assistant Secretary, Ministry of Supply.
- Francis Carol Hampden, Assistant Secretary, Ministry of Transport & Civil Aviation.
- Alexander Harrison, Lately Chairman of the Edinburgh Savings Bank.
- John Napthali Hart. For political and public services in Enfield.
- Cyril Alexander Frederick Hastilow, OBE, chairman, Docker Brothers, Birmingham.
- Theodore George Alexander Henderson, DCM, Manager and Secretary, Scottish Milk Marketing Board.
- Arthur Edward Hewitt, MC, JP, managing director, W. T. Copeland & Sons Ltd., Stoke-on-Trent.
- Alderman Thomas Rowland Hill. For public services in Leicester.
- Alderman Matthew Holland, JP, chairman, Nottinghamshire Education Committee.
- Lex Hamilton Hornsby, Chief Information Officer, Ministry of Labour & National Service.
- George Houldsworth Houlden, MBE, managing director of the Shipbuilding Division, Vickers-Armstrongs Ltd.
- Percy Granville Hutton, Assistant Solicitor, Board of Inland Revenue.
- Dorothy Christian Liddle Johnstone, Assistant Secretary, HM Treasury.
- David Jones, Painter and Author.
- Harry Ernest Jones, Assistant Secretary, Ministry of Commerce, Northern Ireland.
- John Arthur Llewelyn Vaughan-Jones, MB, ChB, JP, Regional Medical Adviser, East and West Ridings Region, Yorkshire. For services to the Ministry of Labour & National Service.
- Sidney Anderson Kinnear, HM Inspector of Constabulary for Scotland.
- Raymond Lewis Lawson, deputy director of Armament Supply, Admiralty.
- Charles Ernest Lucette, MBE, Manager and Secretary, Manchester Ship Canal Co.
- Reginald William Lunn, Technical Director, Leyland & Birmingham Rubber Co. Ltd.
- Colonel Edward Frank Maltby, OBE, Foreign Office.
- Cecil George Mant, Deputy Director General of Works, Ministry of Works.
- Eoin Cameron Mekie. For political and public services.
- The Honourable Lilian Helen Montagu, OBE. For services to Jewish Organisations.
- Walter Cecil Moore, Director, Plant Pathology Laboratory, Ministry of Agriculture, Fisheries & Food.
- Kevern Ivor Morgan, OBE, JP. For political and public services in Swansea.
- Lionel Percival William Arthur Mortimer, Assistant Secretary, Ministry of Agriculture, Fisheries & Food.
- Raymond Mortimer, Author and Literary Critic.
- William Roderick Mullen. For services to the Ministry of Agriculture, Northern Ireland.
- Charles George Morley New. For services to the Electricity Industry.
- Frederick Harwood Norman. For services to the Civil Service Commission.
- Alderman Frederick Ernest Oliver, TD, DL. For political and public services in Leicester.
- Hedley John Parham, assistant director, Department of the Director of Public Prosecutions.
- John Bryan Ward-Perkins, Director of the British School at Rome.
- John Cassels Pinkerton, MC, JP, City Assessor, Glasgow Corporation.
- David Doig Pratt, OBE, Director, Chemical Research Laboratory, Department of Scientific and Industrial Research.
- George Taylor Pringle, HM Senior Chief Inspector of Schools, Scottish Education Department.
- Fleetwood Craven Pritchard, MC, chairman, Senior Partner, Pritchard, F. G. Wood & Partners Ltd., London.
- Harold Leney Raybould, Controller of Supplies, Ministry of Works.
- Lister Philip Rees, Chief Technical Adviser, Central Land Board and War Damage Commission.
- Geoffrey Arthur Roberts, MBE, Director of Manning, Air Ministry.
- Henry Goland Robinson, Emeritus Professor of Agriculture, University of Nottingham.
- Frederick William Roques, MD, FRCS, Consultant in Gynaecology to the Royal Air Force.
- Max Leonard Rosenheim, MD, FRCP, Professor of Medicine, University of London.
- Wilfrid Stanley Scammell, MC. For political and public services in Somerset.
- Louis Christian Schiller, MC, HM Inspector of Schools (Staff Inspector), Ministry of Education.
- Harold Percy Raymond Scott, Joint Managing Director, Summersons Foundries Ltd., Darlington.
- Bernard Alexander Royle Shore. For services to Music.
- Charles Short, Chief Valuer (Scotland), Board, of Inland Revenue.
- Charles Alan Slatford, MC, Custodian of Enemy Property for England and Wales, Board of Trade.
- James Snoxhill, Regional Controller, Midland Region, Ministry of Pensions & National Insurance.
- Captain Arthur Christopher John Soames, MP, Member of Parliament for Bedford since 1950. Parliamentary Private Secretary to the Right Honourable Sir Winston Churchill, KG, OM, CH, MP, 1952–1955. For political and public services.
- Henry Edward Steel, Chief Ship Surveyor, Ministry of Transport & Civil Aviation.
- Eric George Sugden, OBE, Assistant Secretary, Ministry of Education.
- Frederick Neil Sutherland, General Manager, Marconi's Wireless Telegraph Co. Ltd.
- William Sweeney, JP. For public services in Belfast.
- Robert Eric Swift, Director of Aeronautical Inspection, Ministry of Supply.
- Harold McCarter Taylor, TD, Secretary-General of the Faculties, University of Cambridge.
- Humphrey George Taylor. For services to the Chain and Chain Cable Industry.
- Lieutenant-Colonel Horace Cuthbert Rees Thompson, TD, DL, chairman, County of Monmouth Territorial and Auxiliary Forces Association.
- James Leonard Thomson, Professor of Mechanical Engineering, Royal Military College of Science, Shrivenham.
- George Benjamin Thorneycroft, MM, lately General Secretary, Transport Salaried Staffs' Association.
- John Norman Toothill, General Manager, Ferranti Ltd., Edinburgh.
- Percy Brooksbank Walker, Deputy Chief Scientific Officer, Royal Aircraft Establishment, Ministry of Supply.
- Samuel Richard Walker, Member of the Common Council of the City of London. Chairman of the Reconstruction Committee of the Guildhall.
- Alexander West, chairman, Welland River Board, Lincolnshire.
- Johannes Wilde, Professor of the History of Art, University of London.
- James Thomas Pither Wilson, Chief Registrar in Bankruptcy, High Court of Justice.
- Annie Florence Wood, JP. For political and public services in Birmingham.
- Eileen Louise Younghusband, MBE, JP, Lecturer in Social Science, London School of Economics. Chairman of the West London Juvenile Court.
- George Cameron Allen, lately Cultural Relations Adviser, United Kingdom High Commission in Germany.
- George Beckwith Dent, British subject resident in Burma.
- Professor Edward Vivian Gatenby, OBE, lately Linguistics Adviser to the British Council and Professor of English Language and Literature, Ankara University.
- Austin Gill, lately Director of the British Institute, Paris.
- David Jarvis Mill Irving, Her Majesty's Consul-General (designate) at Algiers.
- George Norman McLeod Law, chairman of the Board of Directors of Barclays Bank Ltd., in Egypt and the Sudan.
- Derek Lomax, lately Senior Justice of the High Court of the Sudan.
- Malcolm Smith Mainland, General Manager, Fields and Pipeline Iraq, Iraq Petroleum Co. Ltd.
- Joseph Robinson, Her Majesty's Ambassador Extraordinary and Plenipotentiary in Asunción.
- Adolf Basser. For philanthropic services in the State of New South Wales.
- Alexander Kirkwood Brown. For services to the United Kingdom business community in Bombay, India.
- William Hives Eastwood, OBE. For public and political services in the Federation of Rhodesia and Nyasaland.
- Anderson Colin Talbot Edwards. For services to the Interim Public Service Commission, Federation of Rhodesia and Nyasaland.
- John Lewers Grove, MD, BS, a prominent physician in Launceston, State of Tasmania.
- Norman Bede Rydge. For public services in the State of New South Wales.
- William Thomas Smith, OBE, Chairman of various Native Labour Boards in Southern Rhodesia.
- George Lloyd Wallis, OBE, JP, a farmer in Swaziland.
- John Clarence Bryant, OBE. For public services in North Borneo.
- John Kenneth Buchanan, Chairman of the Federal Public Service Commission, Nigeria.
- Robert Benson Carey, Member for Works, Federation of Malaya.
- Philip Arthur Tyrer Chrimes, chairman, Singapore Harbour Board.
- John Constantine Clerides, QC. For public services in Cyprus.
- Matthew Kirkham Needham Collens, Commissioner of Police, Gold Coast.
- The Right Reverend Nigel Edmund Cornwall, The Lord Bishop of Borneo.
- William Fairley, Chief Civil Engineer, Office of the Crown Agents for Oversea Governments & Administrations.
- Louis Galea, OBE, Attorney-General, Malta.
- Gordon Gibson, Chief Mechanical Engineer, East African Railways and Harbours Corporation.
- Richard Thomas Bondfield Green, MD, Senior Bacteriologist, Institute for Medical Research, Federation of Malaya.
- Sir Roger Evans Hall. For public services in Bermuda.
- Robert Alston Hammond, OBE, Director of Veterinary Services, Kenya.
- Mallam Haruna, Emir of Gwandu, Northern Region, Nigeria.
- Herbert John Hinchey, Financial Secretary, Mauritius.
- Roy Adolphus Joseph, OBE, Minister of Education and Social Services, Trinidad.
- The Reverend Mother Kevin, Mother General of the Missionary Sisters of St Francis, Uganda.
- Lo Man Wai, OBE, JP. For public services in Hong Kong.
- Captain Henry Wilfred Scott McGrath, Custos of the Parish of St Catherine, Jamaica.
- Charles William Tachie-Menson, OBE. For public services in the Gold Coast.
- Victor Herbert Merttens, Commissioner of Income Tax, East Africa High Commission, and Commissioner of Inland Revenue, Kenya.
- The Right Reverend James Moris, Roman Catholic Bishop of Roseau, Dominica, Windward Islands.
- Andrew James Don Small. For public services in Kenya.
- Charles William Stanley Seed. Lately Director of Audit, Federation of Malaya and Singapore.
- Thio Chan Bee, JP. For public services in Singapore.

==== Officer of the Order of the British Empire (OBE) ====
Military Division

Royal Navy

- Lieutenant-Colonel Harry Barnes, Royal Marines Forces Volunteer Reserve.
- The Reverend Bernard William Briggs, Chaplain.
- Commander Hugh Wilson Findlay, DSC.
- Commander Jack Raymond Haysom.
- Instructor Commander John Sydney Hewitt.
- Commander John Samuel Hervey Lawrence.
- Chief Officer Catherine Alice Lawson, Women's Royal Naval Service.
- Commander Alexander John McHattie, DSC, RD, Royal Naval Reserve.
- Captain William Walter Peddle, Royal Fleet Auxiliary Service.
- Commander Frederick Hugh Phillips.
- Commander Edward Bernard Tancock, DSC, (Retd.)
- Lieutenant-Commander Louis George Toone.
- Commander Robert Travers Young, (Retd.)

Army

- Lieutenant-Colonel (now Colonel (temporary)) Arthur Tobia Abate (303451), Corps of Royal Electrical & Mechanical Engineers.
- Lieutenant-Colonel Charles Warwick Allpass, TD (109768), Royal Regiment of Artillery, Territorial Army.
- Lieutenant-Colonel (acting) Anthony Arthur Arnold (65486), Combined Cadet Force.
- Lieutenant-Colonel (temporary) Charles Frederic Villiers Bagot (50952), Royal Regiment of Artillery.
- Lieutenant-Colonel Peter John Barbary, MBE, GM, TD (65924), Royal Regiment of Artillery, Territorial Army.
- Lieutenant-Colonel Peter Millard Bennett (56618), Corps of Royal Engineers.
- Lieutenant-Colonel Edward Bryan Stanley Scott-Clarke, TD (62394), The Bedfordshire and Hertfordshire Regiment, Territorial Army.
- Lieutenant-Colonel Arthur Cooper (182968), Royal Tank Regiment, Royal Armoured Corps (Employed List).
- Major John Hector Creswell (77550), Royal Regiment of Artillery.
- Lieutenant-Colonel Derek Norrington Cronin, MBE, TD (66597), The Worcestershire Regiment, Territorial Army.
- Lieutenant-Colonel (acting) William John Drake, 16th Essex Battalion, Home Guard.
- Lieutenant-Colonel (acting) Harry Edward Richard Ford, MC (11761), Army Cadet Force.
- Lieutenant-Colonel (acting) William Edwin Gill, MBE, TD, 4th West Lancashire Battalion, Home Guard.
- Lieutenant-Colonel George Gregg, MD (108108), Royal Army Medical Corps, Territorial Army.
- Lieutenant-Colonel Samuel Griffith (33699), The Welch Regiment (now RARO).
- Lieutenant-Colonel Alwyne Tregelles Hingston, MBE (50823), Royal Regiment of Artillery (Employed List).
- Lieutenant-Colonel Michael O'Connor Horgan, TD (39604), Corps of Royal Engineers, Territorial Army.
- Lieutenant-Colonel (temporary) Kenneth Hunt, MC (151485), Royal Regiment of Artillery.
- Brevet Lieutenant-Colonel John Antony Hunter, DSO, MBE, MC (63621), The Bedfordshire and Hertfordshire Regiment.
- Major Samuel Newburgh Standish Hutchins (74539), Royal Regiment of Artillery.
- Lieutenant-Colonel Henry Kelly, TD (76823), Royal Regiment of Artillery, Territorial Army.
- Lieutenant-Colonel Samuel Arthur Leivers, TD (71932), Royal Regiment of Artillery, Territorial Army.
- Lieutenant-Colonel (temporary) John Michael Hardwicke Lewis (85569), Corps of Royal Engineers.
- Lieutenant-Colonel (temporary) (now Major) Robert Richmond Lindsay (66037), Royal Regiment of Artillery.
- Lieutenant-Colonel Bernard Warren Mallory (126545), Royal Army Ordnance Corps.
- Lieutenant-Colonel (temporary) (now Major) William John Martin (201217), The Suffolk Regiment.
- Lieutenant-Colonel William Paul (151227), Royal Regiment of Artillery, Territorial Army.
- Lieutenant-Colonel Alfred George Penna (32102), Royal Army Service Corps.
- Lieutenant-Colonel Robert Mordan Thorne Clarke Campbell-Preston, MC, TD, DL, JP (39010), The Scottish Horse, Royal Armoured Corps, Territorial Army (now TARO).
- Lieutenant-Colonel George Harcourt Rae, MC, TD (63027), The King's Own Scottish Borderers, Territorial Army (now TARO).
- Lieutenant-Colonel (acting) Reginald Ramsbotham, 4th/6th North Riding Battalion, Home Guard.
- Lieutenant-Colonel Walter George Robinson, TD (63706), Royal Regiment of Artillery, Territorial Army.
- Lieutenant-Colonel John Charles Christopher Shapland (68714), Royal Army Service Corps.
- Lieutenant-colonel Charles James Stewart, TD (71983), The Somerset Light Infantry (Prince Albert's), Territorial Army.
- Lieutenant-Colonel William Muir Stewart, MB (73590), Royal Army Medical Corps.
- Lieutenant-Colonel (temporary) Stanley Storm, MC (138822), The Cameronians (Scottish Rifles).
- Lieutenant-Colonel John Patrick Turrill, TD (63080), Royal Regiment of Artillery, Territorial Army.
- Lieutenant-Colonel James Newton Vallance, TD (87237), Royal Regiment of Artillery, Territorial Army.
- The Reverend Guy Rowland Whitcombe, MA, Chaplain to the Forces, Second Class (101551), Royal Army Chaplains' Department.
- Lieutenant-Colonel (acting) Stanford Edwin Doig (356916), Corps of Royal Electrical & Mechanical Engineers; at present on loan to the Government of India.

In recognition of services in Korea during the period 1 August 1954 to 31 January 1955.

- Lieutenant-Colonel Charles Herbert Stainforth (378004), Royal Army Service Corps.
- Major (Temporary Lieutenant-Colonel) John Castle Woollett, MC (66051), Royal Engineers.

Royal Air Force

- Wing Commander Albert Edward Davey (31475).
- Wing Commander Alfred Herbert Harding, DFC (NZ70033), Royal New Zealand Air Force.
- Wing Commander Ernest Alfred Johnston (33343).
- Wing Commander Robert Alfred Milward, DFC (37201).
- Wing Commander Lilian Gertrude Moore, MB, BCh (5291).
- Wing Commander Walter Robinson, MBE (35122), (Retd.)
- Wing Commander James Clarke Taylor, MB, ChB (23323).
- Wing Commander Alistair Robert Cameron Young, MRCS, LRCP (23176).
- Acting Wing Commander Alistair Milne Grant (90181), Royal Auxiliary Air Force Reserve of Officers.
- Acting Wing Commander Albert Frederick Wallace, DFC (45463).
- Acting Wing Commander Arthur Harry Wilkes (74319).
- Squadron Leader Edmund Lionel Bloxham (45076).
- Squadron Leader Frank Clifford Charles (44042), (Retd.)
- The Reverend Ernest William Daly.
- Squadron Leader John Henry Christian Dickie (116095).
- Squadron Leader John McGuire, DFC, (155394).
- Squadron Leader Derek Shannon Vaughan Rake, AFC (124494).
- Squadron Leader Ernest Halliday Tidswell (86885).
- Squadron Leader Arthur Harry Wilkes (74319).
- Squadron Leader Donald Fraser Wilson (41891).
- Acting Squadron Leader John Arthur McCorquodale, MBE (54801).

Civil Division

- George Lloyd Ackers, Chief Sanitary Engineer, Ministry of Works.
- Reginald Thomas Alden, Member of the Licensing Authority for Public Service Vehicles, East Midland Area.
- Andrew Alexander, Principal Officer, Ministry of Home Affairs, Northern Ireland.
- William Alexander Macdonald Allan, Divisional Engineer, Main Drainage Division, London County Council.
- Robert Stanley Allen, MBE, Honorary Secretary, Luton Rural District Savings Committee.
- Lloyd William Ambrose, Chief Accountant, Board of Trade.
- Reginald Virgo Atkinson, Works Director, Gloster Aircraft Co. Ltd., Gloucester.
- The Reverend Father Alfonsus George Attard, Officiating Chaplain to the Royal Air Force in Malta.
- Victor Louis Austin, Deputy Controller, Supplies Department, General Post Office.
- The Right Honourable Christopher William, Baron Barnard, CMG, MC, TD, DL. For services to the Boy Scouts Association in County Durham.
- Dorothy Violet Bartlett, Deputy Controller of Export Licensing, Board of Trade.
- Herbert Leslie Beards, Assistant Scientific Adviser, Air Ministry.
- Bernard Nicolas Bebbington, Chief Constable, Cambridge City Police Force.
- Walter Beesley, deputy chairman, Buckinghamshire Agricultural Executive Committee.
- Donald Arthur de Candt Bellamy, Senior Engineer, Ministry of Transport & Civil Aviation.
- William Ferguson Bennett, Senior Engineer, Ministry of Finance, Northern Ireland.
- George Philip Billot, lately Jurat and Lieutenant-Bailiff, States of Jersey.
- Jack William Gibbons Bird, MBE, DL, Chief Engineer, South Wales Electricity Board.
- Ernest Sidney Blake, MBE, Vice Chairman, Eastern Regional Board for Industry.
- Hugh Noel Blakiston, Assistant Keeper, First Class, Public Record Office.
- John Charles Boyle. For political services.
- Ursula Blanche Branston. For political services.
- Ronald Dallas Brett, Principal, Ministry of Housing & Local Government.
- Arthur Douglas Briggs, MB, ChB, Medical Superintendent, Stobhill Hospital, Glasgow.
- Francis John Broad, Town Clerk, Borough of Barnstaple, North Devon.
- Henry William Brookling, MBE, MC, Superintendent of Common Services, Admiralty.
- Leonard Brooks, Honorary Treasurer, Royal Geographical Society.
- Anthony Arthur Duncan Montague Browne, DFC, lately Private Secretary to the Right Honourable Sir Winston Churchill, KG, OM, CH, MP.
- Captain Harold James Hine Bulford, Principal Officer, Mercantile Marine Survey Office, Southampton.
- The Honourable Vera Elizabeth Butler. For political and public services in Devon.
- Muriel St. Clare Byrne, Lecturer at the Royal Academy of Dramatic Art.
- Gathorne Hardy Cheyne, BEM, Chief Constable, Orkney Constabulary.
- Rudolf Kynoch Clark, Official Receiver in Bankruptcy, Birmingham, Board of Trade.
- William Joseph Clarke, MBE, Financial Adviser and Chief Auditor, Middle East Air Force.
- William Clarkson, MBE, chief executive officer, Commonwealth Relations Office.
- Sydney Dyson Cleveland, Director, City Art Galleries, Manchester.
- Emma Frances Heather Clode, MBE, Head of Civil Defence Department, Women's Voluntary Services.
- Olga Kathleen Collett, Assistant Commissioner and Principal, Civil Service Commission.
- James Courtney, Chief Engineer, Ulster Transport Authority.
- Samuel Campbell Cupples, JP, chairman, Down County Council.
- Bertram Rees Davies, chief executive officer, Forestry Commission.
- Evan Glyn Davies, JP, Alderman, Cardiganshire County Council.
- Griffith Leonard Davies. For services to the Civil Service Commission.
- Stephen John Davis, Foreign Exchange Adviser, Petroleum Division, Ministry of Fuel & Power.
- Arthur Dawkins, MBE, Command Secretary, Army General Headquarters, East Africa.
- Nancy Meade De Mierre, Director, Service Hospitals Welfare Department, Order of St John of Jerusalem and British Red Cross Society.
- William McLachlan Dewar, Member, Scottish Air Cadet Council.
- John James Dobbin, County Inspector, Royal Ulster Constabulary.
- William James Fullerton Donald, JP, chairman, County Antrim Education Committee.
- Horace Norman Dove, Assistant Accountant General, Ministry of Labour & National Service.
- Robert Hugh Dyball, TD, Senior Science Master, City of London School.
- Frederick William East, Catering Administrative Officer, National Service Hostels Corporation Ltd.
- Charles Aubrey Babington Elliott, JP, Member, Domestic Coal Consumers' Council.
- Alfred George Evans, First Class Valuer, Board of Inland Revenue.
- Captain George Lewys Bennett-Evans, Member, Montgomery Agricultural Executive Committee.
- Robert William Fair, deputy director of Patents, Ministry of Supply.
- George Edward Firth, Director for Scotland, Arts Council of Great Britain.
- Henry Elliot FitzGibbon, Senior Housing and Planning Inspector, Ministry of Housing & Local Government.
- Major William Foster, MC, TD, JP. For political and public services in Nottingham.
- Solomon Freedman, Principal, Board of Customs & Excise.
- Robert Cotton Bruce Gardner, Secretary, Royal Forestry Society of England and Wales.
- Arthur Havard Arnold Gem, MC. For services to Physical Education.
- Jabez D'Arcy Glanville, Deputy Chief Engineer, Industrial Group, United Kingdom Atomic Energy Authority.
- Harold William Glenister, chairman, Eastbourne National Insurance Local Tribunal.
- Alderman Kenneth Edward Boulton Glenny, JP. For political and public services in Essex.
- Horace William Gooding, MBE. For public services in Belfast.
- Gerald Grey, Waterguard Superintendent, Liverpool Board of Customs & Excise.
- Ivy Lilian Habershon, JP. For public services in Rotherham, West Riding of Yorkshire.
- William Harold Hale, chairman, Wolverhampton Local Employment Committee.
- Derek Ivens Archibald Hamblen, attached War Office.
- Grace Ellen Hamblin, Personal Private Secretary to the Right Honourable Sir Winston Churchill, KG, OM, CH, MP.
- Richard Alexander Hamilton, Chief Scientist of the British North Greenland Expedition.
- Stanley Baines Hamilton, Principal Scientific Officer, Building Research Station, Department of Scientific & Industrial Research.
- George Edward Hance, MBE, Grade 2 Officer, Branch B, Foreign Service, Foreign Office.
- Thomas Percy Harris, MM, Grade 2 Officer, Ministry of Labour & National Service.
- Alderman Wilfred Harris. For public services in North Lincolnshire.
- John George Arthur Harrow. For political services.
- William Frank Haslop. For services in the preservation of mediaeval buildings.
- Ronald Eugene Worrall Hastain, President, London Far East Prisoners of War Social Club.
- George Hawkins, Chief Accountant, Ministry of Fuel & Power.
- Joseph Edwin Hawkins, chairman, Kingston Local Employment Committee.
- Daphne Constance, Lady Heald. For services to Nursing.
- Rennie Higson, Senior Chief Administrative Officer, Office of the Public Trustee.
- Leslie Burgess Hobgen, Superintending Mechanical and Electrical Engineer, Grade II, Air Ministry.
- Frederick Charles Victor Holmes, Chief Chemist, Cunard Group of Shipping Companies.
- Henry William Holmes, MBE, chief executive officer, War Office.
- Alice Bridget Horan, National Woman Officer, National Union of General & Municipal Workers.
- Sidney Aldolph Horstmann, MBE, lately managing director, Horstmann Ltd., Bath.
- Albeit Edward Horton, Registrar of Assets and Head of Estates Branch, National Coal Board.
- James Findlay Hosie, MBE, Principal, Ministry of Defence.
- John Aspey Hough, Research Officer, Co-operative Union Ltd.
- Alderman Joseph Edward Hughes, MM, JP, chairman, St Helens Civil Defence Committee, Lancashire.
- Charles Balfour Clephan Hunter, JP, Member, Scottish After-Care Council.
- Neville Donald Hyam, assistant director of Navy Contracts, Admiralty.
- Hans Peter Juda, Publisher and Editor of The Ambassador.
- Clement Murray Kerr, Commandant, Fire Service College, Dorking.
- James Turnbull Kidd, TD. For political and public services in Scotland.
- Muriel Dewé Lake. For political and public services in Suffolk.
- Dennis Alfred Lamb, General Manager, British Overseas Fairs Ltd.
- Harry Lawrence, MM, Assistant Controller, Post Office Savings Department, Harrogate, Yorkshire.
- William John Cooper Lawrence, Head of the Department of Physiology and Plant Culture, John Innes Horticultural Institution, Hertfordshire.
- Grace Wynifred Lodge, District Superintendent, West Riding of Yorkshire, St John Ambulance Brigade.
- Herbert Stanley Lofthouse, Deputy Chief Constable, West Riding of Yorkshire Constabulary.
- Robert Elliott Lax Lovell, Technical Director, Vosper Ltd., Portsmouth.
- Alderman Charles Henry Lucas, JP. For political and public services in Halifax.
- John Campbell Macdonald, Chief Technical Officer, British Sugar Corporation Ltd.
- John Campbell MacFarlane, Headmaster, Bellahouston Senior Secondary School, Glasgow.
- The Reverend Robert Mackintosh, Secretary, Home Board of the Church of Scotland.
- Archibald James McLelland, Principal, Department of Agriculture for Scotland.
- Alderman James Alexander McNab, MBE, chairman, Tunbridge Wells Borough Savings Committee.
- James Barclay McNee, Director and General Manager of Engine Works, Barclay, Curle & Co. Ltd., Glasgow.
- John Eusebius Madden, General Services Manager, British Overseas Airways Corporation.
- John Colman Mann, County Agricultural Officer, Norfolk.
- Alderman Jacquetta Marshall, chairman, Moorhaven Hospital Management Committee, Plymouth.
- Edmund William Mason, Chief Mycologist, Commonwealth Mycological Institute, Kew.
- Irene Massie, MBE, Senior Chief Executive Officer, Foreign Office.
- John Carr Menzies, MM, Secretary and House Governor, Robert Jones and Agnes Hunt Orthopaedic Hospital, Oswestry, Shropshire.
- Claude Geoffrey Metson, Secretary, National Association of Corn & Agricultural Merchants Ltd.
- Edward John Mitchell, Principal Inspector of Taxes, Board of Inland Revenue.
- Hugh Gibb Mitchell, Higher Collector, Glasgow, Board of Customs & Excise.
- Albert Joseph Moore, MBE, chief executive officer, Ministry of Health.
- Ramsey Bignall Moore, chairman, Manx Museum and National Trust.
- Richard Arthur Philip Morgan, Superintendent, Royal Ordnance Factory, Birtley, County Durham.
- Cyril George Morris, MBE, Member, National Savings Assembly, representing Denbighshire.
- George Alexander Moss, lately Postal Controller, Home Counties Region, General Post Office.
- James Richard Frederick Moss, Constructor, Naval Construction Department, Admiralty, Bath.
- Lieutenant-Colonel Evelyn Edmunds Mulock, MC, DL, Secretary, County of Cornwall Territorial and Auxiliary Forces Association.
- William Henry Oatley, Secretary and Treasurer, Church of England Pensions Board.
- George Lionel Orchard, Governing Director, Colin MacAndrew & Partners Ltd., Edinburgh.
- George Alfred Stanley Paines, Secretary, Croydon Hospital Management Committee.
- James Williamson Park, General Manager, British Guiana Consolidated Goldfields Ltd.
- Lionel Alfred Payne, Director and Manager, Cooke, Troughton & Simms Ltd., York.
- Arthur Albert Peachey, assistant director of Contracts, Ministry of Supply.
- Richard Bruce Peddie, MC, JP, lately Area Manager, National Dock Labour Board, East Scotland.
- Harold Ernest Robert Peers. For political and public services in Cheshire.
- Mary Antonia Phillips, Superior General of the Congregation of the Sisters of the Sacred Hearts of Jesus and Mary, Chigwell Convent, Woodford Bridge, Essex.
- Algernon Harold Philpot, chairman, Milk Powder Pool.
- Harold Pickford, Assistant Controller, HM Stationery Office.
- Nancy Proctor, JP. For political and public services in Liverpool.
- Thomas Proudlove, Assistant Accountant and Comptroller General, Board of Inland Revenue.
- Lieutenant Commander Ronald Charles Quirk, RNVR, lately chairman, Sea Cadet Corps Unit, Croydon.
- Norman Reay, chief executive officer, Ministry of Pensions & National Insurance.
- Anne Redpath Michie, Artist Member of the Board of Management of the Edinburgh College of Art.
- Charles Edward Richardson, chief executive officer, Ministry of Works.
- Elwyn Roberts, Senior Principal Scientific Officer, Explosives Research & Development Establishment, Ministry of Supply.
- Charles Arthur Robinson, Divisional Air Traffic Control Officer, London and South Eastern Divisional Headquarters, Ministry of Transport & Civil Aviation.
- Philip Arthur Rodway, chairman, Midland Region, Wholesale Provisions & Groceries Committee.
- Francis William Roger, JP, Member, Scottish Agricultural Advisory Council.
- Lieutenant-Colonel Thomas Landale Rollo, MC, TD. For political and public services in Fife.
- Alfred William Ross, Chief Superintendent, Army Operational Research Group, War Office.
- Lionel Edward Aston Rowson, deputy director, Unit of Reproductive Physiology and Biochemistry, Cambridge, Agricultural Research Council.
- Margaret Jean Roxburgh, Head Almoner, Middlesex Hospital.
- Thomas Harvey Searls, MC, Deputy Controller, Education Division, British Council.
- John Whiteshand, Principal Information Officer, Central Office of Information.
- Martin Fallas Shaw. For services to Church Music.
- Gladys Anne Elizabeth Shee, BEM, Children's Officer, Kesteven County Council, Lincolnshire.
- Dorothy Amy Shortland, Assistant Regional Controller, Southern Region, Ministry of Labour & National Service.
- Frederick William Sidwell, Principal, Ministry of Agriculture, Fisheries & Food.
- Cecil Douglas Smith. For political and public services in Southampton.
- William Allan Smith, Assistant Keeper (First Class), British Museum.
- Margaret Jane Smyth, Matron, St Thomas' Hospital, London.
- Captain George Walton Somerwill, lately Senior Isle of Wight District Pilot, Trinity House Pilotage Service.
- Philip Hylton Spagnoletti, Director and General Manager, Kolster-Brandes Ltd., Sidcup, Kent.
- Eileen Margaret Spelman, Member of the National Insurance Advisory Committee.
- Frederic Stay, Alderman, Aldershot Borough Council.
- Bertram Gilchrist Stone, Principal, Colonial Office.
- Captain Alexander George Storkey, Master, The Clan Line Steamers Ltd.
- William Laundon Streeton, Head of Programme Contracts Department, British Broadcasting Corporation.
- Arthur Nesbitt Strong, Secretary, Colonial Civil Servants Association.
- Joseph Sykes, Professor of Economics, University College of the South West of England, Exeter.
- Kenneth Ewart Tansley, Honorary Secretary, Wembley Savings Committee.
- Albert George Tapster, Superintending Examiner, Patent Office, Board of Trade.
- Harold Taylor, chairman, Kettering and District Local Employment Committee.
- Brinley Thomas, Professor of Economics, University College, Cardiff.
- Cyril Thomas, Chief Officer, Monmouthshire Fire Brigade.
- John Louis Benedict Todhunter, Senior Legal Assistant, Ministry of Education.
- William Bertram Turrill, Keeper of the Herbarium and Library, Royal Botanic Gardens, Kew.
- Major Harold Vincent Ward, chairman, Sheffield and District War Pensions Committee.
- The Honourable Marjorie Watson. For services to Young Women's Christian Association of Great Britain.
- William Henry Webb. For political services in County Down.
- Major Herbert Egerton Whaley, JP, DL. For public services in Rutland.
- Connolly Thomas Wilson, managing director, T. Wilson & Son Ltd., Building and Civil Engineering Contractors, Northampton.
- Matthew Thomson Wilson, Principal, Department of Health for Scotland.
- Victor Franklin Wood, MBE, Principal, Ministry of Agriculture, Fisheries & Food.
- Walter William Wood, Chief of Police, South-Western Area, British Transport Commission.
- Muriel May Woodiwiss, Headmistress, Rainsford Secondary Modern School for Girls, Chelmsford, Essex.
- Henry William Woodruff, Principal, Air Ministry.
- Reginald Arthur Wright, Works Manager, Skefko Ball Bearing Co. Ltd., Luton.
- John Edward Zimmer, Principal, Foreign Office.
- Arthur Bennett, First Secretary (Labour) at Her Majesty's Embassy in Vienna.
- Harold Gordon Bird, lately British Resident, Düsseldorf, United Kingdom High Commission in Germany.
- Lieutenant-Colonel Septimus Paul Brooke-Booth, MC, British subject resident in Belgium.
- Geoffrey Renshaw Calvert, First Secretary (Labour) at Her Majesty's Embassy in Tokyo.
- Ernest Wright Cooper, British subject resident in Egypt.
- Reginald Charles-Maxwell-Darling, Chief of the Research Division, Ministry of Agriculture, Sudan Government.
- Wilfred-Howard Fraser, Police Staff Officer, Grade 1, Hamburg.
- Charles William Peter Godward, British subject resident in the Argentine Republic.
- Harold Godwin, Her Majesty's Consul at New York.
- John Kirby House Harriman, British Council Representative in Peru.
- Charles Albert Henshaw, British subject resident in Brazil.
- Paul Philip Howell, lately Chairman of the Southern Development Investigation Team, Sudan.
- John Simpson Owen, lately Commercial Manager, Ministry of Agriculture, Sudan Government.
- Frank Stallwood, lately First Secretary at Her Majesty's Embassy in Beirut.
- James Vaughan, MC, lately British Resident, Soltau, United Kingdom High Commission in Germany.
- Albert Edward Watkins, Her Majesty's Consul at Turin.
- Thomas Beauchamp Wildman, British Consul at Santander.
- Demetrius Catsicas, of Umtali, Southern Rhodesia. For municipal services.
- Ulric St Vincent Earée, Honorary Treasurer, New Delhi Branch, United Kingdom Citizens' Association in India.
- Percy James Hawkins, Director of Armament Supply, Naval Headquarters, India.
- The Reverend Albert Charles Hill, Minister-in-Charge, Norwood Baptist Church, State of South Australia.
- Rowland Hill, chief executive officer, Land Development Executive, State of South Australia.
- John Lett Sealy Jeffares, a surveyor in the Federation of Rhodesia and Nyasaland.
- Lieutenant-Colonel William Wilson Laird. For public services in the Federation of Rhodesia and Nyasaland.
- Joseph Richard Lewis, Secretary of the New South Wales Branch, Returned Sailors', Soldiers' and Airmen's Imperial League of Australia.
- James Hugh Marks, Mayor of Mount Gambier, State of South Australia.
- Captain Ian Honnor Morten, Royal Navy (Retd.), Tobacco Representative in London for the Government of the Federation of Rhodesia and Nyasaland.
- George Munro, of Gatooma, Southern Rhodesia. For public services.
- Robert Everitt King Murray, Senior District Officer, Basutoland.
- Kathleen Stirling Scrymgour, Matron of the Royal Adelaide Hospital, State of South Australia.
- The Reverend Alan Walker, lately Superintendent of the Waverley Methodist Mission, State of New South Wales.
- Oscar Price Wheeler, of Salisbury, Southern Rhodesia. For public and municipal services.
- Arthur Bell Ackland, MBE, ED. For services to the banana industry in Fiji.
- Alhaji Shehu Ahmadu, Madakin Kano, Northern Region, Nigeria.
- Anthony Salmon Aldridge, MC, Senior Administrative Officer, Cyprus.
- Khan Bahadur Muhammad Salim Ali. For public services in Aden.
- Robert Henry Ardill, deputy director of Education, Mauritius.
- Peter Herriott Balmer, Administrative Officer, Western Region, Nigeria.
- Augustus Theodore Adu Beckley, ISO, JP. For public services in Sierra Leone.
- Ernest Bellevue, Deputy Head of Finance Department, Office of the Crown Agents for Oversea Governments and Administrations.
- Gordon Charles Bennett. For public services in Tanganyika.
- Antis Theodore Bewes. For public services in Tanganyika.
- William Roy Billington, MD, BCh. For medical services in Uganda.
- Maurice Henry Cardiff, British Council Representative, Cyprus.
- Frank Wingate Carpenter. Lately Labour Commissioner, Kenya.
- Harold Charles Carter. For public services in Sierra Leone.
- Sidney Beresford Chambers, Statistician, Federation of Nigeria.
- Chee Swee Ee, JP. For public services in Penang, Federation of Malaya.
- Robert George Patrick Nicholson Combe, Resident, West Coast, North Borneo.
- Phaedon George Constantinides. For public services in Cyprus.
- The Venerable Archdeacon Herewald Ramsbotham Davies, Lately Archdeacon of Tobago. For public services.
- Arnarasingham Edward Duraisamy, JP. For public services in the Federation of Malaya.
- Emmanuel Mbela Lifaffe Endeley. For public services in the Federation of Nigeria.
- Henry Forrester, Comptroller of Customs and Excise, Somaliland.
- Sandys Parker George, Commissioner, Nigeria Police Force.
- John Welsby Drake Goodban, Director of Agriculture, British Honduras.
- Gordon Matthews Hector, Secretary to the Government, Seychelles.
- The Very Reverend Hugh Alexander Evan Hopkins. For public services in Kenya.
- Stephen Thomas Hoyle, Chief Agricultural Research Officer, Nyasaland.
- Charles Herbert Newton Jackson, Chief Entomologist, East African Tsetse and Trypanosomiasis Research and Reclamation Organisation.
- Idwel Glyndwr Jones, Commissioner of Labour, Gold Coast.
- John McCall Kidney. For services to sport in Barbados and the West Indies.
- Hollupatherage James Caldera Kulasingha. For public services in Singapore.
- John Russell Marshall, deputy director of Education, Gold Coast.
- The Reverend Leslie Donald Mason, Principal, Christ's School, Ado Ekiti, Western Region, Nigeria.
- David Eric Cameron Mekie, MB, FRCS(Ed), Professor of Surgery, University of Malaya.
- David Smellie Morrison, Harbour Engineer and Acting Harbour Master, Bahamas.
- Charles Barcu Moses, Director of Prisons, Gold Coast.
- James Patrick Mullins. For marine services in Fiji.
- Ngan Shing-Kwan. For public services in Hong Kong.
- Simon Ezievuo Onwu, MB, ChB, deputy director of Medical Services, Eastern Region, Nigeria.
- John William Hamilton O'Regan, Under-Secretary (Administration), Jamaica.
- Michael Symons Osborne. For public services in Montserrat, Leeward Islands.
- Roy Philpott, Deputy Labour Commissioner, Northern Rhodesia.
- John Bernard Prentis, TD, Official Assignee, Registrar of Companies, Societies and Trades Unions, Federation of Malaya.
- Norman Frank Richards, Director of Public Works, Nyasaland.
- Patrick Emile Ryan. For public services in St Kitts, Leeward Islands.
- Cecil Francis Smith, JP. For public services in Singapore.
- Cyril Hilton Smith, Director of Public Works, Bermuda.
- Sydney Eric Smith. For public services in Province Wellesley, Federation of Malaya.
- Woodford George Owen Owen-Smith, Comptroller of Customs, Northern Rhodesia.
- Charles Edward Michael Terry. For public services in Hong Kong.
- John Thomson. For public services in Northern Rhodesia.
- Major Austin Cassar Torreggiani. For public services in Malta.
- Edwin Alfred Trim, MD, deputy director of Medical Services, Kenya.
- Colonel Arthur George Tubb, Financial Secretary, St Lucia, Windward Islands.
- George Brunton Wallace. Lately Plant Pathologist, Tanganyika.
- John Edgar Hutchinson White, deputy director of Education, Eastern Region, Nigeria.
- Guy Lancaster Bruce Wiehen. For services to Education in Jamaica.
- John Vernon Wild, Establishment Secretary, Uganda.
- John William Milner Williams, Regional Director, East African Posts and Telecommunications Administration.
- Henry Eric Wilson, ED. For public services in the Northern Region, Nigeria.

==== Member of the Order of the British Empire (MBE) ====
Military Division

Royal Navy

- Honorary Lieutenant-Commander Alexander Birnie, Royal Naval Volunteer (Wireless) Reserve.
- Lieutenant-Commander Montague Keith Burnett.
- Temporary Commissioned Stores Officer Frederick Anthony Cogger, (Retd.)
- Commissioned Boatswain Stanley George Currie-Davis.
- Temporary Commissioned Air Engineer Ronald George Daw.
- Lieutenant Sidney Donovan, Royal Navy (Retd.)
- Lieutenant-Commander Laurence Dudley Kilbee, VRD, Hong Kong Royal Naval Volunteer Reserve.
- Lieutenant-Commander Leslie Albert Victor Lawrence.
- Lieutenant-Commander George Thomas Martin, (Retd.)
- Wardmaster Lieutenant Walter Mark Mornement.
- Temporary Acting Lieutenant (Sp) Sidney Arthur Strath, Royal Naval Volunteer Reserve.
- Temporary Senior Commissioned Engineer Ronald John Wallace, Navy (on loan to the Indian Navy).
- Senior Commissioned Bandmaster Alfred Owen White, Royal Marines.
- Lieutenant (E) Sidney Tom Henry Winkworth, DSC, (Retd.)
- Lieutenant-Commander Edgar John Woodget.

Army

- 2101163 Warrant Officer Class II James Agnew, The Argyll and Sutherland Highlanders (Princess Louise's), Territorial Army.
- Major Ruth Dawson Allerton (192401), Women's Royal Army Corps.
- Captain Kevin Edward Patrick Andrews (349273), Royal Corps of Signals.
- Major John Patrick Asher (85566), Corps of Royal Engineers.
- 5492074 Warrant Officer Class II Cyril Edward Ayling, Royal Regiment of Artillery, Territorial Army.
- Major Denis Ewing Ballantine, MC (85673), The Wiltshire Regiment (Duke of Edinburgh's).
- Lieutenant-Colonel (local) Geoffrey Lynes Brewster (64035), Royal Regiment of Artillery.
- 4384034 Warrant Officer Class II George Butterworth, The South Lancashire Regiment (The Prince of Wales's Volunteers), Territorial Army.
- 41231308, Warrant Officer Class II Jack Chambers, The Cheshire Regiment.
- Major Henry Charles Chinn (104316), Royal Regiment of Artillery (Employed List).
- Major (formerly Local Lieutenant-Colonel) Basil Constanduros (160385), Royal Regiment of Artillery.
- Major (Quartermaster) Harry Roberts Cotton (147468), The Suffolk Regiment.
- Major Charles Warwick Daniel, TD (155526), Royal Regiment of Artillery, Territorial Army.
- 21019262 Warrant Officer Class I William Davidson Corps of Royal Electrical & Mechanical Engineers.
- Captain (acting) Charles Vernon Doe, 5th Devonshire Battalion, Home Guard.
- Major Ronald Herbert Down (167845), Royal Army Service Corps, Territorial Army.
- Captain Archibald Smythe Dunn (181109), Corps of Royal Military Police, Territorial Army.
- Major Brian Reginald Emmett (71288), Royal Regiment of Artillery.
- Major Cecil Ernest Esnouf, TD (2472), Combined Cadet Force.
- Major Reginald Gilbert Bevan Evans (154593), Royal Regiment of Artillery, Territorial Army.
- The Reverend Thomas Dewi Theodore Jones-Evans, TD, Chaplain to Forces, Third Class (92855), Royal Army Chaplains' Department, Territorial Army.
- Major (Quartermaster) ELobert Redvers Evelyn, TD (87889), Royal Corps of Signals, Territorial Army.
- Captain John Frederick Everett, TD (69617), Royal Corps of Signals, Territorial Army.
- 5387986 Warrant Officer Class II Sidney Ernest Favell, Royal Regiment of Artillery, Territorial Army.
- Major Mariota Fetherstonhaugh, TD (192205), Women's Royal Army Corps, Territorial Army.
- Major (temporary) George Knowling Franklin (27532), The Lancashire Fusiliers (Employed List).
- Major (acting) Thomas Guy Newport Franklin, 15th Essex Battalion, Home Guard.
- Major (Quartermaster) Charles Funnell (109844) Royal Armoured Corps (now retired).
- S/287629 Warrant Officer Class I Robert Marr Fyvie, Royal Army Service Corps.
- Major (acting) James Gibson (298495), Army Cadet Force.
- 6853470 Warrant Officer Class II Roy Elmire Leslie Granger, The King's Royal Rifle Corps, Territorial Army.
- 2320565 Warrant Officer Class II Alexander Grant, Royal Corps of Signals.
- Major Cyril James Grindley (164382), The Queen's Royal Regiment (West Surrey).
- Major (EMAE) Harold Alfred Grossman (85836), Corps of Royal Electrical & Mechanical Engineers.
- Major Sheila Anne Elizabeth Heaney, TD (192854), Women's Royal Army Corps.
- Lieutenant (Quartermaster) Geoffrey Christopher Hensby (433536), Royal Armoured Corps.
- Major Irene Holmes (402694), Women's Royal Army Corps, Territorial Army.
- Major Benjamin Howel Jones, TD (161696), Royal Regiment of Artillery, Territorial Army,.
- Major (Quartermaster) John William Jones (131467), Royal Army Medical Corps, Territorial Army.
- 2865985 Warrant Officer Class II William Kean, The Gordon Highlanders, Territorial Army.
- 815666 Warrant Officer Class I (acting) Alfred King, Royal Regiment of Artillery.
- Major Annie Gwynneth Learmouth, TD (244999), Women's Royal Army Corps, Territorial Army.
- Captain (Quartermaster) John MacDonnell (336792), The Queen's Own Cameron Highlanders, Territorial Army.
- Major Adam Maitland, TD, (52373), Royal Regiment of Artillery, Territorial Army.
- Major Walter Mantle (105783), Royal Regiment of Artillery.
- Major James Maurice Marshall, TD (65913), Royal Regiment of Artillery, Territorial Army.
- 7075638 Warrant, Officer Class II George Alexander Martin, The Royal Lincolnshire Regiment, Territorial Army.
- Major Robert William Martin, TD, (75621), Corps of Royal Military Police.
- Major (temporary) Henry Ernest McDermott (260657), Corps of Royal Electrical & Mechanical Engineers.
- Captain (temporary) Gilbert Edward George Lariston Elliot-Murray-Kynynmound, Viscount Melgund (397319), Scots Guards.
- Major Arthur John Michelson (263338), Royal Army Dental Corps.
- Major Samuel Sidney Moffett (178970), The Royal Warwickshire Regiment (Employed List).
- 22209687 Warrant Officer Class II Samuel Mooney, Royal Regiment of Artillery, Territorial Army.
- Major Clark Nicholson, MC, MB (394747), Royal Army Medical Corps, Territorial Army.
- S/202239 Warrant Officer Class I (acting) (now Warrant Officer, Class II) Joseph Oakes, Royal Army Service Corps.
- 22260915 Warrant Officer Class II Victor O'Neill, Royal Regiment of Artillery, Territorial Army.
- Major Geraldine Anne Daphne Pearson, TD (257089), Women's Royal Army Corps, Territorial Army.
- Major James Robert Stevenson Peploe, MC (77546), Royal Regiment of Artillery.
- 4343099 Warrant Officer Class II John Marshall Porritt, Small Arms School Corps.
- Major (Quartermaster) Edward Leslie Gilbert Richards, MM (371932), Welsh Guards (Employed List).
- 833917 Warrant Officer Class I Reginald James Rigelsford, Royal Regiment of Artillery.
- 7585557 Warrant Officer Class II William Burns Ritchie, The Royal Scots (The Royal Regiment), Territorial Army.
- Major Malcolm Nigel Romer (62031), Scots Guards.
- Major Kenneth Michael MacDonald Ross (112955), 7th Gurkha Rifles.
- 22529748 Warrant Officer Class II Alfred Rutherford, Royal Regiment of Artillery, Territorial Army.
- S/54884 Warrant Officer Class I Henry Edward Sadd, Royal Army Service Corps.
- Major John Buchanan Spittal (259965), Royal Regiment of Artillery.
- 1497108 Warrant Officer Class II Lloyd Thompson, Royal Regiment of Artillery, Territorial Army.
- Major Harold Edward Roy Watson (153264), The Royal Sussex Regiment.
- Major (Quartermaster) George Joseph Francis White (169221), The Oxfordshire and Buckinghamshire Light Infantry.
- Major Frank Eric Wilkins, TD (166787), Royal Regiment of Artillery, Territorial Army.
- Major (temporary), James Hector MacDonald Williams (426589), General List.
- Major Paul Fry Williams, TD (70383), Corps of Royal Engineers, Territorial Army.
- S/6399199 Warrant Officer Class I Arthur St John Wright, Royal Army Service Corps.
- Captain Percy Yates, TD (220607), Royal Regiment of Artillery, Territorial Army.
- 2039077 Warrant Officer Class I George Ayling, Grenadier Guards; at present on loan to the Government of India.
- 4743815 Warrant Officer Class I (acting) Ernest Horace Orton, The York and Lancaster Regiment; attached 1st (Nyasaland) Battalion, The King's African Rifles.
- Captain William Furlong Cox, Fiji Artillery.
- Major John Evelyn Gabain, Singapore Volunteer Corps (In recognition of services in Korea during the period 1 August 1954 to 31 January 1955.).
- Lieutenant Geoffrey John Garvey (390351), Intelligence Corps.
- 4339673 Warrant Officer Class I (Bandmaster) Sidney Wilson Ord-Hume, The Northamptonshire Regiment.

Royal Air Force

- Acting Wing Commander George Henry Currall, MM (73635), Royal Air Force Volunteer Reserve.
- Squadron Leader Ronald Collier (145133), Royal Auxiliary Air Force Regiment.
- Squadron Leader Charles Geoffrey White, BM, BCh (203500).
- Acting Squadron Leader William John Walsh (54755).
- Flight Lieutenant Leslie John Ayling (201938).
- Flight Lieutenant James Oliver Bradley (46594).
- Flight Lieutenant John Francis Daly (570433).
- Flight Lieutenant William John Gear (50291).
- Flight Lieutenant Harry Webster-Grinling (128078), Royal Air Force Reserve of Officers.
- Flight Lieutenant Alan Mervyn Humphreys (54502).
- Flight Lieutenant Maurice George Hunn (45395).
- Flight Lieutenant William Basil Lawrence Leary (167955).
- Flight Lieutenant James Nelson (185268).
- Flight Lieutenant Leslie Pearman, MM (180073).
- Flight Lieutenant William Percy (52552).
- Flight Lieutenant Reginald Ivor Perry, DFC (45445).
- Flight Lieutenant Gordon William Smith (161059).
- Flight Lieutenant Keith Alan Edmund Smith (194264).
- Flight Lieutenant John Donald Symonds (567982).
- Flight Lieutenant Edgar Weeks (56776).
- Flight Lieutenant Kenneth Wood (1475216).
- Flight Lieutenant John William Woolfries (129720).
- Flight Lieutenant George William Wright (51258).
- Acting Flight Lieutenant Kenneth Patrick Meehan (2680003), Royal Auxiliary Air Force.
- Flying Officer Clifford Walter Orriss (54391).
- Flying Officer John Peter Whitehead, AFM (365988).
- Warrant Officer Lewis Stanley Abbott (568429).
- Warrant Officer Kenneth Ashton (517996).
- Warrant Officer Henry William Frank George Burchell (623577).
- Warrant Officer Gilbert Reynold Davies (514645).
- Warrant Officer George William Hall (566014).
- Warrant Officer Harold Kinsey (564247).
- Warrant Officer Francis Norman Lamb (988801).
- Warrant Officer Donald Philip Joel Lean (590910).
- Warrant Officer Sidney Charles Mantle (590073).
- Warrant Officer Edward Arthur Morgan (512511).
- Warrant Officer John Morgan (515370).
- Warrant Officer Sidney Alfred Motte (513900).
- Warrant Officer Leslie Donald Rose (149910).
- Warrant Officer Stanley James Spall (514111).
- Warrant Officer Kenneth James Taylor (513771).
- Warrant Officer Robert Waggett (509480).
- Warrant Officer William Gilroy Robinson Whitmore (509376).
- Warrant Officer George Alexander Wren (615579).
- Acting Warrant Officer Brian Charles Partridge (577406).
- Acting Warrant Officer Eric Stow (506741), Royal Air Force Regiment.

Civil Division

- Bessie Margaret Ainley Norman, Honorary Secretary, West Wight Savings Committee, Isle of Wight.
- Catharine Euphemia Anderson, Ward Sister, Medical Ward, Edinburgh Royal Infirmary.
- Mary Myfanwy Andrews, Headmistress, Llangwyryfon County Primary School, Aberystwyth, Cardiganshire.
- Arthur Edward Ashton, Senior Executive Officer, Ministry of Pensions & National Insurance.
- Arthur Ronald Gibbins Ashworth, Senior Executive Officer, Ministry of Agriculture, Fisheries & Food.
- Eli Ayland, Works Manager, Engineering Division, John Curran Ltd., Cardiff.
- Edward Cecil Baker, Senior Executive Officer, General Post Office.
- George Belfield Baker, Civilian Workshop Officer, Didcot, Berkshire, War Office.
- Mary Louisa Lawson Baker, Higher Executive Officer, Tithe Redemption Commission.
- John Gordon Bamber, Charge Nurse, Brockhall Hospital, Langho, near Blackburn.
- Francis Arthur Buchanan Barnard, Civil Substitution Officer, Headquarters, Flying Training Command, Royal Air Force.
- William Newland Barrington, Inspector, Immigration Branch, Home Office.
- Stuart Barry, Manager, Middlesbrough Employment Exchange, Ministry of Labour & National Service.
- Alfred Edward Batchelor, Senior Executive Officer, Air Ministry.
- Fred Walshaw Bateman, Director, Morton Engineering Services Ltd., Croydon.
- William Stanley Bates, Director and Secretary, Philip & Son Ltd., Dartmouth, Devonshire.
- Frank Baxter, Manager, N. Corah (St Margaret) Ltd., Leicester.
- John Henry Baxter. Secretary, Police Training Centre, Harrogate.
- Sidney Bayliss, Chief Warden, Bristol Civil Defence Corps.
- Ralph Beal, Chief Marine Superintendent, William Cory & Son Ltd.
- Thomas Balfour Beattie, Vice-chairman, Huddersfield and District Local Employment Committee.
- Jessie Allan Wherrie Beatty, chairman, Belfast County Borough Schools Savings Committee.
- Douglas Dunbar Bell, Refinery Engineer, Tate & Lyle Ltd., Liverpool.
- Katherine Lennox Bennett, lately Executive Officer, Department of Agriculture for Scotland.
- Leslie Woodbridge Bennett, JP, chairman, Letchworth Local Employment Committee and Disablement Advisory Committee.
- William Gibson Bennett, Works Manager, Climax Rock Drill & Engineering Works Ltd., Redruth, Cornwall.
- Frederick William Bird, Laboratory Manager, Fullers Earth Union, Redhill, Surrey.
- Richard William Henry Biss, Honorary Secretary, Wood Green Savings Committee.
- William Harrison Blacklock, Higher Executive Officer, Lord Advocate's Department.
- Kathleen Nancy Bleakley, Honorary Secretary, Bangor, County Down, Branch, Dr Barnardo's Helpers League.
- Frederick William Bleeze, Senior Executive Officer, Passport Office.
- Ivor Louis Hugh Bolt, Divisional Officer, Hampshire Fire Brigade.
- Arthur Gordon Boniface, Grade 3 Officer, Branch B, Foreign Service, Foreign Office.
- Margaret Elizabeth Bonnar, Transport Officer, Scottish Headquarters, Women's Voluntary Services.
- William Frederick George Bonner, Higher Executive Officer, Board of Customs & Excise.
- Thomas Beresford Boothman, Secretary, Bolton Master Cotton Spinners' Association.
- John Arthur Borron, Regional Information Officer, Office of the Deputy High Commissioner for the United Kingdom in Madras, India.
- William Bowen. For public services in Salford, Lancashire.
- Blanche Bowles, Honorary Secretary, Poole Savings Committee.
- Frank Bowtell, Chief Office Clerk, House of Commons.
- Elizabeth Gordon Boyd, Home Teacher of the Blind, Fermanagh County Welfare Committee.
- John Malcolm Boyd, Chief Switch Designer, Electric Construction Co. Ltd., Wolverhampton.
- Stuart Harley Wallis Boyns, Station Engineer, Brentford Works, North Thames Gas Board.
- John Henry Breeze, Member, Isle of Ely Agricultural Executive Committee.
- Philip Anthony Brennan, Executive Officer, Board of Trade.
- Cecil Rhodes Brewer, Chief Draughtsman, Royal Aircraft Establishment, Ministry of Supply.
- William Ernest Brittle, Superintendent, Fulham Bulk Plant, Esso Petroleum Co. Ltd.
- Helen Mary Katherine Wright Brown, lately County Organiser, Cumberland, Women's Voluntary Services.
- Henry Brown, Chief Engineer, Reads Ltd., Liverpool.
- Hugh Brown, Engineering Chief Draughtsman, Harland & Wolff Ltd., Belfast.
- Leslie Buchan, deputy director of Accounts, British Council.
- Walter Daniels Burton, Headmaster, Grangetown Junior County School, Boys' Department, Yorkshire.
- Catherine Cameron, Head Teacher, Oa Primary School, Isle of Islay, Argyll.
- James Campbell, Secretary and Treasurer, Mission to Mediterranean Garrisons.
- Winifred Kate Cardozo. For services to the Disabled Soldiers Embroidery Industry.
- Grace Ellen Cartlidge, Higher Executive Officer, Foreign Office.
- Hilda Marion MacDonald Cashell. For political and public services in Reading.
- Ceinwen Chapman, Centre Organiser, Ilford Women's Voluntary Services.
- George Alfred Chapman, Head of Operational Section, Meat Importers' National Defence Association Ltd.
- Gilbert John Chapman, JP. For political services in Belfast.
- Herbert George Cheel, General Manager, General Electric Co. Ltd., Wembley, Middlesex.
- Harry Cheetham, Chief Assistant Engineer, Trent River Board.
- Thomas Henry Chicken, lately chairman, West Cumberland War Pensions Committee.
- The Reverend William Edward Clapham. For public services in Bow, East London.
- Frederick William Clark, Brickworks Manager, Richard Thomas & Baldwins Ltd., Belton and Crowle, Lincolnshire.
- Sheila Grace Ellice-Clark, County Quartermaster, Kent, British Red Cross Society.
- Annie Hilda Clews. For political and public services in Poole.
- Harold James Coleman, Principal Executive Officer, New Scotland Yard.
- Reginald Charles Comerford, Assistant (Scientific), Ministry of Agriculture, Fisheries & Food.
- John Connolly, Warden, Forhill House Remand Home, Birmingham.
- Ina Lindsay Cook Assistant Secretary, Royal College of Physicians.
- Ernest Cooper. For services to Music in Huddersfield.
- Rose Ellen Coulson, lately Senior Executive Officer, Ministry of Pensions & National Insurance.
- Christina Young Coutts. For political and public services in Fife.
- Harold Walter Cox, Electrical Engineer, Electrical & Musical Industries Engineering Development Ltd., Hayes, Middlesex.
- John Craig, Divisional Officer (Grade III), Western No.2 Area Fire Service, Scotland.
- Observer Officer Frederick Harry Crane, Group Officer, No.14 Group, Winchester, Royal Observer Corps.
- Mary Catherine Crane, Secretary, Melton Mowbray Branch, National Farmers' Union.
- Andrew Crighton, Manager, Howden Flax Mill, near Goole, Yorkshire.
- Eric Croft, Fishery Officer, Lancashire & Western Sea Fisheries Committee.
- Henry Albert Crouch, Senior Executive Officer, Cabinet Office.
- Herbert Crump, Works Manager, Engineering and Shell Division, Beans Industries Ltd., Tipton, Staffordshire.
- Alfred Thomas Cullen, Superintendent and Deputy Chief Constable, Southampton Borough Police Force.
- Doris Margaret Gumming, Senior Instructress in Rural Domestic Economy, Berkshire County Council.
- Thomas Cunningham, Honorary Secretary, Cregagh Branch, Belfast British Legion.
- John Ronald Currington, Deputy Commissioner, National Savings Committee.
- Elizabeth Mary Dagley, lately, Higher Executive Officer, Ministry of Housing & Local Government.
- Sidney Thomas Danby, Assistant District Postmaster, Battersea.
- Jane Davidson, Lady Superintendent, Birkwood Mental Deficiency Institution, Lesmahagow, Lanarkshire.
- Hilda Dawson, Sister, St Luke's Hospital, Bradford.
- Kemp Day, Leading Draughtsman, John I. Thornycroft Ltd., Southampton.
- Fred Dent, Inspector of Taxes, Board of Inland Revenue.
- Alice Elizabeth Dewar, Senior Executive Officer, Ministry of Pensions & National Insurance.
- Jpseph Henry Dixon, lately Accountant, Medical Research Council.
- Henry Walter Thomas Dodd, District Officer, HM Coastguard, Ministry of Transport & Civil Aviation.
- Stanley Swainson Donaldson, Clerk to the Maryport Urban District Council, Cumberland.
- Lilian Anna Doolan, Higher Clerical Officer, Foreign Office.
- Donald Gordon Duff, MC, MB, FRCS(Ed), Surgeon-Superintendent, Belford Hospital, Fort William.
- George William Duncan, chairman, Mull District Council, Argyllshire.
- Bryn Morgan Dyer, Principal Youth Employment Officer, Bristol Local Education Authority.
- Edith Annie Eames, Out-Patient Midwifery Sister, City of London Maternity Hospital, Islington.
- Joseph Allen Earthy, Higher Executive Officer, Air Ministry.
- John Wilfred Easton, Deputy Armament Supply Officer, Admiralty.
- James Douglas Eddy, Manager, Long Eaton Government Training Centre, Derbyshire, Ministry of Labour & National Service.
- John Edwards, Executive Officer, British Museum.
- Dorothy Elsie Ellingford, Higher Executive Officer, Central Land Board and War Damage Commission.
- Leslie John Elliott, Superintending Measurer and Recorder, Admiralty, HM Dockyard Devonport.
- Horace Dudley McDonogh Ellis, Engineer, Designs Department, British Broadcasting Corporation.
- James Ellis, Divisional Officer, Essex Fire Brigade.
- Gertrude Mary Elton. For political and public services in Leicester.
- Andrew Parish, Area Superintendent, Northern Area (Carlisle), Ribble Motor Services Ltd.
- Captain Francis Hamilton Fasson, JP, County Director, Roxburghshire, Scottish Branch, British Red Cross Society.
- Jean Walker Ferguson, Superintendent, School of Rural Domestic Economy, Craibstone, North of Scotland College of Agriculture.
- William Ferguson Secretary and Finance Member, Leith Port Area Grain Committee.
- William Harold Fielding, Higher Executive Officer, Ministry of Health.
- Kathleen M Foord, Matron at Lady Grigg Maternity Hospital, Pumwani, Nairobi, Kenya
- Albert Maurice Ford, Senior Executive Officer, Paymaster General's Office.
- Erik Oscar Forsberg, Senior Executive Officer, Ministry of Agriculture, Fisheries & Food.
- William Kermick Forsyth, Chief Stations Engineer, British Overseas Airways Corporation.
- Charles Foster, Mechanical Engineer, Powers-Samas Accounting Machines Ltd., Croydon.
- Ruth Mary Fountain, Clerical Officer, Ministry of Education.
- Arthur Hubert French, Senior Executive Officer, Ministry of Transport & Civil Aviation.
- Lizzie Gageby, Clerical Officer, Ministry of Commerce, Northern Ireland.
- John William Edward Gardner, Chief New Development and Process Engineer, D. Napier & Son Ltd., Liverpool.
- Catharine Mackinnon Gavin, Woman Inspector, Board of Control and Ministry of Health.
- Samuel Walker Gerrie, Ophthalmic Optician, Glasgow.
- Frederick Joseph Gibbs, Area Cold Storage Officer, Grade I, Port of Liverpool, Ministry of Agriculture, Fisheries & Food.
- Ernest George Gilbert, Higher Executive Officer, War Office.
- Richard Curtis Gilham, Senior Executive Officer, General Post Office.
- Ronald Lionel Gillham, Signals Officer, Air Navigational Services, Ministry of Transport & Civil Aviation.
- Elizabeth Anne Gilliatt, Personal Private Secretary to the Right Honourable Sir Winston Churchill, KG, OM, CH, MP.
- John Moore Gillon, Senior Executive Officer, Ministry of Fuel & Power.
- John William Goldsack, Superintendent, Civil Aviation Constabulary, London Airport.
- Ernest Walter Good, MM, Higher Executive Officer, Ministry of Works.
- Thomas Bertram Goodman, Assistant Chief Officer, Kent Fire Brigade.
- George Ernest Goodwin, Higher Executive Officer, Radar Research Establishment, Ministry of Supply.
- Davis Ingle Gotch, MC, TD, Senior Estate Surveyor, Ministry of Works.
- Phyllis Norton Graham, Founder and chairman, St Mary's Pioneer Mothercraft Training Centre, Dundee.
- Frederick Gray. For political and public services in Liverpool.
- Frederick Richard Gray, Superintendent, Metropolitan Police Force. (Recently appointed Assistant Chief Constable, Newcastle upon Tyne).
- James Green, chairman, Clitheroe Rural District Council, Lancashire.
- George Paxton Greenlaw, Chief Sanitary Inspector, Ayr County Council.
- Amy Grey, JP. For political and public services in Gateshead.
- Elizabeth Griffin, Assistant Teacher, Harding Memorial Primary School, Belfast.
- Observer Lieutenant Robert Alfred Grimmer, Deputy Commandant, No.7 Group, Bedford, Royal Observer Corps.
- Thomas William Guy, Member, Richmond District Committee, North Riding of Yorkshire Agricultural Executive Committee.
- Leslie Dean Hadler, Senior Station Radio Officer, Middle East Land Forces.
- Herbert Preston Hale, Senior Experimental Officer, Low Temperature Research Station, Department of Scientific & Industrial Research.
- Amy Lily Elizabeth Hamer, Home Help Organiser, Leicestershire.
- James Nuttall Hamer, District Manager for Scotland and Northern Ireland, Export Credits Guarantee Department.
- Thomas Craig Hamilton, Labour Officer, Imperial Chemical Industries Ltd., Stevenston, Ayrshire; Vice-chairman, British Legion (Scotland).
- Alice Mary Hammond. For political and public services in Deptford.
- Laura Hannam. For political and public services in Worksop.
- David Harris, Senior Executive Officer, Ministry of Pensions & National Insurance.
- Frederick George Harris, Higher Executive Officer, Central Land Board and War Damage Commission.
- Frederick Ernest Harrison, chairman, Liverpool and District Air Training Corps Committee.
- Frederick Adolph Hartman. For services to the Civil Service Sports Council.
- Alfred Haslam, Vice-chairman, Reading and District Employment Committee.
- Henry John Hawkes, Chief Foreman (Crimpsall), Doncaster, Eastern Region, British Railways.
- Phyllis Way Hayter, Organising Secretary, Essex County Association for the Blind.
- Lilly Clough Herring, Honorary Vice President, Belfast Branch, British Red Cross Society.
- Samuel Maurice Barklie Hill, MB, BCh, Regional Medical Officer, Northern Region, British European Airways.
- William Dodd Hill, lately Clerk to the Haverfordwest Rural District Council, Pembrokeshire.
- Colton Richard Hinds, Locomotive Works Manager, Darlington, North Eastern Region, British Railways.
- John Harold Hinson, deputy director of Accounts, HM Stationery Office.
- John Hodgkinson, Member, Flintshire Agricultural Executive Committee.
- Henry Hogg. For services as Chief Engineer, Paris City, Sir William Reardon Smith & Sons Ltd.
- Reginald Roy Hogsden, Civil Engineer, Headquarters Flying Training Command, Royal Air Force.
- David Hood, Grade 6 Officer, Scottish Area, Ministry of Labour & National Service.
- Thomas Frederick Hopkins, Grade 3 Officer, Ministry of Labour & National Service.
- Captain Arthur Alexander Horn, Assistant Secretary, County of London Territorial and Auxiliary Forces Association.
- Ernest Horn, managing director, Curtis & Horn, Machinery Dealers, Oxford.
- Edward Albert Hughes, Manager, Long Lane Colliery, North Western Division, National Coal Board.
- Archibald Hunter, Actuary, Wigan Savings Bank.
- Geoffrey Ratcliff Husbands, Senior Executive Officer, Ministry of Pensions & National Insurance.
- James Hutton, Fitting and Assembly Shop Superintendent, Albion Motors Ltd., Scotstoun, Glasgow.
- Alfred John Jackson, General Secretary, National Federation of Meat Traders Associations.
- Frederick Bernard Jacomb, JP, chairman, Martley Rural District Council.
- William Percy Jaeger, Area Meat Grader, North Western Area, Ministry of Agriculture, Fisheries & Food.
- William James, Honorary Secretary, Runswick Station, Royal National Lifeboat Institution.
- John Jardine, JP. For political and public services in Dumfries.
- Marjorie Lilian Jenkins, Headmistress, Pound Hill County Primary (Infants) School, Crawley, Sussex.
- Sidney Harold Jewitt, Surveyor, Rochester District, Board of Customs & Excise.
- Oswald Frusher Johnson, JP, chairman, Rawmarsh Savings Committee, Rotherham, Yorkshire.
- Geoffrey Herbert Jolly, Special Officer, Federation of Master Cotton Spinners' Associations Ltd.
- David Samuel Jones, Higher Executive Officer, Ministry of Transport & Civil Aviation.
- Captain Hilton John Jones, Master, RFA Saucy.
- Walter Jones, lately Assistant Manager, Plate Glassmaking Department, Pilkington Brothers Ltd., St Helens, Lancashire.
- Helen Kaplan, lately Honorary Secretary, Glasgow Corporation Transport Department Savings Group.
- John Brayshaw Kay, Inspector of Taxes, Board of Inland Revenue.
- Robert Kay, Staff Officer, Scottish Command, War Office.
- George Keddie, Senior Accountant, Ministry of Agriculture, Fisheries & Food.
- Willoughby Frederick Kelly, Experimental Officer, Aeroplane & Armament Experimental Establishment, Ministry of Supply.
- Maud Lilian Kelsall, Higher Clerical Officer, Admiralty.
- Maud Kent, lately Higher Executive Officer, Board of Trade.
- Robert Glen Kerr, Senior Executive Officer, Board of Customs & Excise.
- James Edwin Lambert, Senior Assistant Engineer, North Eastern Electricity Board.
- Jeremiah William James Lambeth, Acting Foreman of Wharf, Royal Victoria Yard, Deptford, Admiralty.
- Dorothy Lammin Lammin. For political and public services in Folkestone and Hythe, Kent.
- Frederick Charles Lawrence, JP, chairman, Strood Rural District Council, Kent.
- Redvers Roberts Henry Laws, Higher Executive Officer, Air Ministry.
- Edith Lawton, Secretary, St Edward's Hospital Management Committee, Cheddleton, Staffordshire.
- Charles Richard Leigh, Works Manager, Portals (John Allen & Sons) Ltd., Ivybridge, Devonshire.
- Maurice Lemberger, Senior Executive Officer, Colonial Office.
- George Alexander Lemen, Superintendent and Deputy Chief Constable, Greenock Burgh Police, Renfrewshire.
- John Anthony Lewis, Regional Collector of Taxes, Board of Inland Revenue.
- Maggie Miriam Lewis, Matron, St David's (Mental) Hospital, Carmarthen.
- Richard Walter Lewis, Chief Chemist, Burndept Ltd., Dundee.
- Dora Tertia Liebenthal, Honorary Organiser, National Galleries of Scotland Lunch Hour Concerts in Edinburgh.
- Frederick William Light, Senior Executive Officer, Admiralty.
- Jack Livings, Detective Chief Superintendent, Metropolitan Police Force.
- Frederick William Lloyd, TD, chairman, South West Wales War Pensions Committee.
- Hedley Lloyd, Director and Supervisory Export Manager, Marsh Brothers & Co. Ltd., Sheffield.
- Charles Wheeler Locke, Chief Warden, Manchester Civil Defence Corps.
- Andrew Morrison Logue, County Sanitary Officer, County Londonderry.
- Henry Edward London, Senior Executive Officer, Ministry of Supply.
- Elizabeth Lund. For political and public services in Nelson and Colne.
- Alderman Herbert James Lowton Lygoe, JP, chairman, Holloway Disablement Advisory Committee.
- William Heymer McCallum, Station Superintendent, Warrington Power Station, North West, Merseyside and North Wales Division, British Electricity Authority.
- Alderman Norman McCretton, Organiser, National Union of General & Municipal Workers, Tyneside District.
- Janet MacGregor Macdonald, Honorary Secretary and Treasurer of the Culcabock School Savings Group, Inverness-shire.
- Margaret McKeown, Municipal Midwife, Liverpool.
- Rose Robinson McLernon, Vice-Principal, Victoria College, Belfast.
- Thomas Smith McMain, Traffic Manager, W. Alexander & Sons Ltd. (Scottish Omnibuses Group), British Transport Commission.
- John McQuiggan, Higher Executive Officer, Office of the Deputy High Commissioner for the United Kingdom in Lahore, Pakistan.
- Lamont Mahaffy, District Inspector, Royal Ulster Constabulary.
- Captain Frederick Mara, Master, MV Pacific Coast, Coast Lines Ltd.
- John Anthony Markland, Chief Clerk, Westminster County Court.
- John Harrison Marshall, Ground Communications Manager, British European Airways.
- Lewis Gerton Marshall, Staff Officer, Board of Inland Revenue.
- Joshua Stoker Marwood, Traffic Superintendent and Chief Assistant to General Manager, River Wear Commissioners.
- Cecil Mason. Head Postmaster, Ormskirk, Lancashire.
- Stanley Herbert Matthews, Assistant Programme Accountant, British Broadcasting Corporation.
- Horace Mayson, Higher Executive Officer, Ministry of Supply.
- William Henry Mercer, Chief Superintendent, Lancashire Constabulary.
- Eric Merrill, Senior Information Officer, Southern Command, War Office.
- James Michie, Manager, James Keiller & Son Ltd., Dundee.
- Frederic Charles Morris, Conductor, Shrewsbury Choral, Operatic and Orchestral Societies.
- Catherine Flett Matheson Mowat. For political and public services in Caithness.
- Kathleen Muir, Manageress, Papworth Poultry Farm, Cambridgeshire.
- Ernest Henry Munnion, managing director, E. H. Munnion Ltd., Builders, Sussex.
- Thomas Murphy, General Secretary, Showmen's Guild of Great Britain.
- George Henry Neale, Inspector of Taxes, Board of Inland Revenue.
- Harry Lingwood Neate, Bullion Clerk, Royal Mint.
- Gladys Maud Newcombe, Senior Major, Salvation Army, in charge of Mayflower Training Home for Neglectful Mothers.
- Harold Henry Newell, Superintendent, Rehabilitation Workshop, Vauxhall Motors Ltd., Luton, Bedfordshire.
- Isabella Nicolson, Headmistress, Boleskine Primary School, Gorthleck, Inverness-shire.
- Nicholas Hiram Richards Normington. For political and public services in Cornwall.
- Arthur Joseph Maurice Ozmond, Assistant Head of Television Design, British Broadcasting Corporation.
- Edward Llewellyn Panes, chairman, Sevenoaks and Tonbridge District Committee, Kent Agricultural Executive Committee.
- William Henry Park, JP. For political services in Northern Ireland.
- Bailie Irvine Theodore Parker, MC, JP, Secretary, Kilmarnock Grange School Savings Group, Ayrshire.
- Robert James Parker, Senior Telecommunications Superintendent, Cable and Wireless, Birmingham, General Post Office.
- John Comer Parkinson, assistant director, Eggs Division, Ministry of Agriculture, Fisheries & Food.
- John Paterson, Works Manager, Winsor Engineering Co. Ltd., Hillington, Glasgow.
- John Ritchie Patterson, JP. For political and public services in Dundee.
- Robert Jarvie Patterson, President, St Andrew's and Red Cross Scottish Ambulance Service, Wishaw.
- Pamela Evelyn Payne, Executive Officer, Ministry of Housing & Local Government.
- Anthony Wadham Knatchbull Peacock, lately Senior Executive Officer, Principal Probate Registry.
- Gladys Elizabeth Pegler, Senior Executive Officer, Ministry of Agriculture, Fisheries & Food.
- Medley John Pellow, Assistant Dockmaster, Southampton.
- Clarence Penson, Superintendent of Managed Houses, State Management District, Carlisle.
- John Eric Leslie Peters, Division Officer, Reproduction Branch, Ordnance Survey, Southampton.
- Captain William Pirrie, Commander, Fishery Cruiser Brenda, Scottish Fishery Protection Service.
- Hilda Mary Porter, Secretary, Methodist Committee for the Care of Overseas Students.
- Sidney Arthur Potter, Honorary Secretary, Coventry Savings Committee.
- William Preston. For political services.
- Arthur Granville Ravensdale, chairman, East Midland Regional Schools Advisory Savings Committee.
- George William Raymond, Chief Welfare Officer, Ministry of Agriculture, Fisheries & Food.
- William Stratton Rea. For political services in South Tyrone.
- George Reeve, JP, Area Organiser, United Patternmakers' Association.
- William Ridley, Surveyor, Chester-le-Street, Urban District Council, County Durham.
- John Roberts, JP, chairman, Wallasey Local Employment Committee and Disablement Advisory Committee, Cheshire.
- Lizzie Roberts, Headmistress, Infants' Department, Windsor Street County Primary School, Liverpool.
- Mavis Rose Roberts, Accounting Equipment Supervisor, British Overseas Airways Corporation.
- Edward Walter Rope, Senior Purser, SS Oronsay, Orient Steam Navigation Co. Ltd.
- Isabel Myrtle Rowley, Honorary Secretary, Forces Help Society and Lord Roberts Workshops, Cumberland.
- Ernest Evelyn Ryder, Principal Assistant, Public Health Department, London County Council.
- Frank Sidney Salter, Chief Designer, Hydraulic Department, Loewy Engineering Co. Ltd., Poole, Dorset.
- Thomas Edward Salvin, Staff Officer (Planning), Southern Command, War Office.
- Elizabeth Jessie Sayer, Assistant in the Prime Minister's Office.
- John Frederick Sayer, Executive Officer, HM Treasury.
- Alderman Tom Markley Scotney, JP. For political and public services in Huntingdonshire.
- Florence Mary Sears, Temporary Clerk, Grade II, Senior Trade Commissioner's Office, New Delhi, India.
- Florence Ethel Seed, Principal, School for Officers' Children, Aldershot.
- John Farrar Shackleton, MC, Senior Executive Officer, Ministry of Pensions & National Insurance.
- Ethel Nora Sprake Sharp. For political and public services in Ipswich.
- George Hallett Shelley. Lately Honorary Organiser, Citizens Advice Bureau, Reigate and Redhill, Surrey.
- Doris Mildred Sheridan, Higher Executive Officer, Ministry of Transport and Civil Aviation.
- Harry Simpson. For political and public services in Birmingham.
- William Leslie Simpson, Chief Works Engineer, Newey Brothers Ltd., Birmingham.
- James Ernest Sitch, Manager, Smethwick Employment Exchange, Ministry of Labour & National Service.
- Edith Elise Smith, JP. For political and public services in Eccles.
- Captain Sidney Bedford Smith, Master, MV Catford, South Eastern Gas Board.
- William Lees Smith, Senior Vehicle Examiner, South Eastern Traffic Area, Ministry of Transport & Civil Aviation.
- William Percy Smith, Higher Executive Officer, Board of Trade.
- William Alfred Smithdale. Lately Senior Shop Superintendent, Rolls-Royce Ltd., Derby.
- Winifred Mary Smy, Headmistress, Bramfield Primary School, East Suffolk.
- Thomas Austen Edwin Spearing, Deputy Controller Designate, Hammersmith Civil Defence Organisation.
- William Arthur Stace, MC, Area Manager, Brighton, Southdown Motor Services Ltd.
- Henry Taylor Stead, Assistant Works Manager, Charles Roberts and Co. Ltd., Wakefield.
- Charles Arthur Steedman, Executive Engineer, Telephone Manager's Office, Southampton, General Post Office.
- Francis John Stephens, Higher Executive Officer, Ministry of Defence.
- George Douglas Stephens, Senior Chief Steward, Uganda, British India Steam Navigation Co. Ltd.
- Robert James Stepney, Assistant Chief Officer, Berkshire and Reading Fire Brigade. (Recently appointed Chief Officer of the Cambridgeshire Fire Brigade).
- James Steptoe, Clerk to the Sturminster Rural District Council, Dorset.
- Florence Louise Stevens. For political and public services in East Ham.
- Robert Nelson Stevenson, Deputy Principal Officer, National Assistance Board, Northern Ireland.
- William Stewart, DSC, RD, JP, Skipper-Owner MB Sireadh.
- Dorothy Stokes, Chief Clerk, Telephone Manager's Office, South East Area, General Post Office.
- George Stott, Manager, Remploy factories at Newcastle-on-Tyne and Jarrow.
- James Strachan, Crop Husbandry Officer, Grade II, National Agricultural Advisory Service.
- William Carter Styan, Engineer Designer, Vickers-Armstrongs Ltd., Crayford, Kent.
- Helen Isabel Sutherland, Secretary, Royal Society for the Prevention of Accidents.
- Charles Frank Sutton, Senior Experimental Officer, Air Ministry.
- Albert Sweet, Chief Clerk, Stockport, Cheshire, Royal Regiment of Artillery, Territorial Army.
- Edith Marie Taylor, lately District Officer, South West Area, National Institute of Houseworkers Ltd.
- Hubert Arthur Carnelley Thomas. For political and public services in Llanelly.
- Emma Mary Thorneloe. For political and public services in Coventry.
- Elsie Louise Titchener, Executive Officer, War Office.
- George Herbert Todd, Shipyard Manager, Hawthorn Leslie (Shipbuilders) Ltd., Hebburn-on-Tyne, County Durham.
- Ivo Townsend, Clerk to the Licensing Authority, Scottish Traffic Area, Ministry of Transport & Civil Aviation.
- Frederick Tucker, Senior Executive Officer, Board of Trade.
- Ernest Tyrie, Senior Assistant (Scientific), Chemical Defence Experimental Establishment, Porton, Ministry of Supply.
- Percival Ernest Vidler, Deputy Secretary, Birmingham Chamber of Commerce.
- Captain George Godfrey Vinnicombe, chairman, Suffolk County British Legion.
- Edna Wadsworth, lately Librarian of the Royal Astronomical Society.
- Mary Walker, Headmistress, Redhill Junior Mixed School, Castleford, Yorkshire.
- Thomas William Walker, Senior Executive Officer, Ministry of Works.
- Ivy Mary Walton, Higher Executive Officer, Ministry of Fuel & Power.
- Mary Irene Warren, Manageress, Salvation Army Red Shield Canteen, Tobruk.
- Richard Wragby Waterfield, Headmaster, Broughton County Primary School, Broughton, Northamptonshire.
- Captain Percy Thomson Watson, District Commandant, Ulster Special Constabulary.
- Walter Harold Webb, Chief Fire Officer and Accident Prevention Officer, Goodyear Tyre and Rubber Co. (Great Britain) Ltd., Wolverhampton.
- Frederick James West, Higher Executive Officer, Air Ministry.
- Wilfrid Richard Wharton, Assistant Principal Clerk, Board of Inland Revenue.
- Samuel Horsfield Wheeldon, Senior Executive Officer, Ministry of Pensions & National Insurance.
- Edward Eric Carrall Wilcocks, Manager, Kasungu Tobacco Estates, Nyasaland.
- Gwilym George Wilcox, Honorary Secretary, Rhondda Savings Committee.
- John Percival Willey, County Ambulance Superintendent, Bedfordshire.
- George William Henry Williams, Local Fuel Overseer, City and Rural District of Hereford.
- Harold Boswarick Williams, Higher Executive Officer, National Assistance Board.
- Norman Harry Williams, Senior Executive Officer, War Office.
- Norma Gwen Wilson, lately Area Organiser, Hong Kong, Women's Voluntary Services.
- Frederick Stanley Withers, Grade 4 Officer, Ministry of Labour & National Service.
- Leonard Woodhouse, Chief Superintendent and Deputy Chief Constable, Stoke-on-Trent City Police Force.
- Frederick Bradley Wray, Higher Executive Officer, Ministry of Transport & Civil Aviation.
- Ellen Louisa Wright, Chief Superintendent of Typists, Central Office of Information.
- Eric Wright, JP, Senior Draughtsman, Industrial Group, Atomic Energy Authority, Risley, Lancashire.
- Henry Reginald Wright, lately Senior Executive Officer, Ministry of Pensions & National Insurance.
- Robert Young, Sub-Area Production Manager, North Eastern Division, National Coal Board.
- William Forbes Young, Director, Resistance Welders Ltd., Inverness.
- Nora Margaret Ziegler Lane. For services as Alexandra Nursing Sister, Soldiers', Sailors' and Airmen's Families Association.
- James Donald Addison, Chief Mechanical and Electrical Engineer to the State of Kuwait.
- Dennis Charles Caldecourt, lately Temporary Senior Executive Officer, United Kingdom High Commission in Germany.
- Bertram Francis Louis Camous, Second Secretary (Commercial) at Her Majesty's Embassy in Madrid.
- Trevor Herbert Ellis Cash, lately British Vice-Consul at Oulu.
- Jean Rosie Cormack, Matron of the Royal Hospital, Baghdad.
- Thomas Joseph Dunne, Director of the Anglo-Argentine Cultural Institute at Mendoza.
- Ellinor Dunsterville, British subject resident in Venezuela.
- Ernest James Wolfgang Stetson Foote, Her Majesty's Vice-Consul at Cleveland.
- Stephen William Garbutt, British Vice Consul at Messina.
- Lily Florence Godwin, British subject resident in Egypt.
- Donald Frederick Hawley, Chief Registrar of the Judiciary, Sudan.
- Doris Theresa Hood, Shorthand typist at Her Majesty's Embassy in Buenos Aires.
- Jacob Joseph Jacob, Chief Translator at Her Majesty's Embassy in Baghdad.
- George William Ladley, Accountant at Her Majesty's Embassy in Buenos Aires.
- Thomas Greig Lauder, British subject resident in Chile.
- Derek Reginald Masters, Temporary Senior Executive Officer, British Military Government, Berlin (British Sector).
- Frederick Moore, Communications Office, Office of the Commissioner-General for Her Majesty's Government in the United Kingdom in South-East Asia.
- Elizabeth Craig Patch, Senior Stenographer at Her Majesty's Consulate-General, Chicago.
- Winifred Desmond Paton, British subject resident in the United States of America.
- Adam Macfarlane Petrie, lately Divisional Engineer, Sudan Government.
- Harold Baty Rider, British subject resident in Egypt.
- George William Scroggs, First Secretary (Commercial) at Her Majesty's Embassy in Rangoon.
- Wilfred Thomas, Comptroller in the Palace of the Governor-General of the Sudan, Khartoum.
- Donald Thurmer, British subject resident in Peru.
- William Tidman, Director of the Sociedade Brasileirade Cultura Inglesa, Curitiba.
- Elizabeth Christina Wallis, Administrative Assistant, United Kingdom Delegation to the United Nations, New York.
- Althea Violet Chanut-Wheeler, British subject resident in France.
- Harold Mosley Wigley, lately Senior Temporary Assistant, United Kingdom High Commission in Germany.
- Albert Roy Black, Honorary President and Organiser, Church Girls' Club for Physical Culture, State of South Australia.
- George Walter Bryan. For services to the United Kingdom community in the North West Frontier Province, Pakistan.
- Geoffrey Cyril Fletcher, President, Bengal Hockey Association, India.
- The Reverend Charles William Haskell, lately Principal, Karachi Grammar School, Pakistan.
- Nora Ivy Hodgson, Honorary Secretary and Treasurer, Guild of Loyal Women, Salisbury, Southern Rhodesia.
- Douglas Edward Hopkins, of Hobart, State of Tasmania. For public services.
- Natalie Kate Jackson, lately Woman Inspector and Senior Woman Officer, Public Services Board, Southern Rhodesia.
- Cornelius Frederick Jamieson. For services to Rugby football in Southern Rhodesia.
- Janet Ada Johnson, a Clerk in the Office of the High Commissioner for Basutoland, the Bechuanaland Protectorate and Swaziland.
- George Scott Jolly, Rural Officer of the Treasury, State of New South Wales.
- Phyllis Frieda Kabot, of Bulawayo, Southern Rhodesia For social welfare services, especially to the British Red Cross Society.
- Cissie Gladys Leigh. For services to the United Kingdom community in Poona, India.
- Gertrude Margaret Lucas. For social welfare services in the State of South Australia.
- Annie May Madden. For public and charitable services in the State of Tasmania.
- Venketsami Subramany Naidoo, Headmaster of the Louis Mountbatten School, Southern Rhodesia.
- Linden Kevin Rath, Officer-in-Charge, Social Welfare Branch, Department of Labour and Industry and Social Welfare, State of New South Wales.
- Joan Harcourt Sargeant, Matron, St John's Park Hospital, State of Tasmania.
- Ian Harry Robertson Shand, Chief Hydrological Engineer, Irrigation Department, Southern Rhodesia.
- Mary Eileen Stenson, formerly Principal of the Piggs Peak European School, Swaziland.
- John William Treloggen, JP. For services to local government in the State of Tasmania.
- Alice Evelyn Tuck, Matron of the South Coast District Hospital, State of South Australia.
- Dorothy Mary Ward, Matron of the Northfield Infectious Diseases Hospital, State of South Australia.
- Captain Ronald Stretton Webb, Royal Field Artillery (Retd.), cartographer. For services to the Basutoland Administration.
- Joseph Harris White, MM, a stock inspector. For services to the Bechuanaland Protectorate Administration.
- George Alexander Graham Adamson, Senior Game Ranger, Kenya.
- Joy Annesley Alcock. For public services in Singapore.
- Kathleen Enid Albury, Clerk to the Health Board and Secretary to the Chief Medical Officer, Bahamas.
- Allaudin Alibhai. For public services in Tanganyika.
- Joan Allan, Matron, King George V Merchant Seamen's Memorial Hospital, Malta.
- Percival Frank Aroozoo. Lately Principal, Gan Eng Seng School, Singapore.
- James Emmanuel Kojo Attram. lately Divisional Court Registrar, Supreme Court, Gold Coast.
- Hassan Bacchus, Judicial Officer, Deeds Registry, British Guiana.
- Sule Agboola Balogun, Education Officer, Western Region, Nigeria.
- Maurice John Bennion, Administrative Officer, Northern Region, Nigeria.
- Thomas Hilton Bedson, Development Officer, Western Region, Nigeria.
- Paul Haycroft Berry, District Officer, Kikuyu Guard, Kenya.
- Violet Bryce, Education Officer, Tanganyika.
- George Alfred Byam, Senior Inspector of Schools, Trinidad.
- Lady Angeliki Cacoyanni. For public services in Cyprus.
- Margaret Florence Cade, Clerk, Office of the Council of Ministers, Federation of Nigeria.
- Neville George David Campbell, BM, BCh, Medical Officer, Sierra Leone.
- Felix Yinmasu Carrena, Chief Inspector, Posts and Telegraphs Department, Federation of Nigeria.
- Chew Jin Bee Lately Assistant Controller of Posts, Postal Services, Perak, Federation of Malaya.
- Edward Stanislaus Chiappe, Civil Engineer, Lands and Works Department, Gibraltar.
- Florence Allene Cleare. For services to the Girl Guide Movement in British Guiana.
- Claude Algernon Collard, Provincial Labour Officer, Nyasaland.
- Wilfred Ernest Ashdown Cook, Livestock Superintendent, Tanganyika.
- Gladys Cook. For public and social services in Antigua, Leeward Islands.
- Philip Gordon Coutts, District Officer, Provincial Administration, Uganda.
- James Warrender Craig. For missionary services in the Gold Coast.
- Robert Egerton Crookall, Education Officer, Western Region, Nigeria.
- George Errolde Gama, Supervisor, Customs and Excise Department, Trinidad.
- Lieutenant-Colonel Gordon Noel Dennis, Executive Engineer, Public Works Department, Northern Region, Nigeria.
- Dogo, Chief of Jaba Independent District, Zaria Province, Northern Region, Nigeria.
- The Reverend John Rafferty Augustine Duffy. For services to Education in the Northern Region, Nigeria.
- Francis Edward Demontmorency Edmonson, Assistant Town Engineer, Freetown City Council, Sierra Leone.
- Benedict Enwonwu, Art Supervisor, Federal Information Service, Nigeria.
- William Howard Biddlecombe Etheridge, Passage Officer, Office of the Crown Agents for Oversea Governments and Administrations.
- Evelyn Jane Alice Evans, Director, Library Services, Gold Coast Library Board.
- Mohamed Faquir, Medical Officer, Uganda.
- Samuel Fischer. For public services in Northern Rhodesia.
- Kathleen Mary Foord, Matron, Lady Grigg African Maternity Hospital, Pumwani, Kenya.
- Edwin Peter Foster, DCM, Plant Inspector, North Borneo.
- Alexander Stoddard Frankson, District Commissioner, British Honduras.
- The Reverend George Robson Fraser. For missionary services in Northern Rhodesia.
- Gordon Francis Gammer, Superintendent of Works, St Helena.
- William James Gatward. For services to agriculture in Fiji.
- Lawrence Theodore Gay, District Inspector, Education Department, Barbados.
- Sayid Mohamed Abdu Ghanem, Education Officer, Aden.
- Mary Glasgow, Principal, Bukit Bintang Girls' School, Federation of Malaya.
- George Alexander Grant, Director of Works, Dominica, Windward Islands.
- Thomas Vivian Greenwood, Engineer, East African Malaria Unit, Amani.
- Georgina May Grogan, Regional Matron, Queen Elizabeth's Oversea Nursing Service, Eastern Region, Nigeria.
- Irene Harley. For public services in Aden.
- George Alphonso Headley. For services to sport in Jamaica and the West Indies.
- Harold Edward Heath. For public services in Zanzibar.
- John Franklin Hindle, Regional Director of Information, Northern Region, Nigeria.
- Ali Ratip Irigoghlou. For public services in Cyprus.
- Michael Jacovides. Lately Assistant Conservator of Forests, Cyprus.
- Jivanji Framji Jasavala, Legal Assistant, Legal Department, Zanzibar.
- The Reverend Mother Marie John. For services to Education in the Seychelles.
- Walter Kendrick. For medical and missionary services in the Bahamas.
- Abiezeri Kyabasinga Kibaya, Medical Officer, Uganda.
- Bia Kur, Paramount Chief, Kholifa Mabang Chiefdom, Sierra Leone.
- Lee Syn Hon, Superintendent, Drawing Office, Survey Department, North Borneo.
- William Leonard Lewis, Senior Livestock Officer, Department of Veterinary Services, Kenya.
- Gwendoline Marguerite Lizarraga. For public services in British Honduras.
- James Lloyd McGairl, Social Development Officer, Tanganyika.
- Ivan Carl Evans McLean. For public services in British Guiana.
- Ellen Douglas Manning. For public services in Barbados.
- The Venerable Archdeacon Erisa Kabiti Masaba, Archdeacon of Masaba Native Anglican Church, Mbale. For public services in Uganda.
- Freda Miles. For welfare and social services in the Northern Region, Nigeria.
- Patrick Nwaokocha Christian Molokwu, Education Officer, Western Region, Nigeria.
- George Henry Abel Morris, Chief Health Inspector, Hong Kong.
- Vishwanath Sitaram Nijasure, Senior Sub-Assistant Surgeon, Tanganyika.
- Alieu Badara N'Jie, Registrar, Supreme Court, Gambia.
- Joseph Oke Nwankwo. Lately Administrative Assistant, Western Region, Nigeria.
- Francis Chukuka Nwokedi, President, Onitsha Native Court, Eastern Region, Nigeria.
- Charles Symon Ogilvie, Game Warden and Superintendent, King George V National Park, Federation of Malaya.
- Isaya Ogwanguji, County Chief of Erute County, Lango District, Uganda.
- Gilbert Oko. For public services in the Eastern Region, Nigeria.
- Bassey Eyibio Okoro, Assistant Secretary, Eastern Region, Nigeria.
- Robert Okafor Okuta. For public services in the Eastern Region, Nigeria.
- Jean Rene Gabriel Orian, Plant Pathologist, Department of Agriculture, Mauritius.
- Dorothy Outerbridge. For public services in Bermuda.
- Charles Stewart Panton, Superintendent of Police, Jamaica.
- Foluseke Adewunmi Olajide Phillips, Senior Assistant Works Manager, Nigerian Railway.
- Edward Oliver Pilgrim, Master, Queen's College, British Guiana.
- John Pinney, District Commissioner, Fort Hall, Kenya.
- Abdul Rashid, Clerk, East African Railways and Harbours.
- William Belcher Greaves Raynor, MC, District Commissioner, Meru, Kenya.
- Ethlyn Maud Rhodd, JP, Head Teacher, Central Branch School, Kingston, Jamaica.
- Eduardo Albert Ribeiro, Assistant Controller of Posts, Hong Kong.
- Anthony Gerald Saville, Administrative Officer, Eastern Region, Nigeria.
- Emily Clara Louise Scott. For welfare services in the British Solomon Islands Protectorate.
- Henry Horace Sedgwick, Head Printer, Government Printing Office, Falkland Islands.
- Sinnadurai Selvanayagam, Headmaster, Sultan Sulaiman School, Kuala Terengganu, Federation of Malaya.
- Ruth Service For nursing services in Northern Rhodesia.
- Ethelbert Fitzroy Shurland. For public services in Trinidad.
- Vera Dorothy Alexandra Silcocks, Headmistress, Ying Wa Girls' School, Hong Kong.
- Sim Hung Liang, Assistant Archivist, Special Branch, Police Department, Singapore.
- Christine Mary Simango. For public services in the Gold Coast.
- Fred Farbridge Smithyman, Principal Agricultural Supervisor, Nyasaland.
- Fela Sowande, Senior Music Assistant, Nigerian Broadcasting Service.
- Nellie Stead. For services to Girls' Education in the British Solomon Islands Protectorate.
- John Leonard Steven, Engineer, Public Works Department, Somaliland.
- James Stewart, Permanent Way Inspector, East African Railways and Harbours.
- James Arnold Sweeney, Acting Assistant Commissioner of Police, Kenya.
- John Mellis Tasker, Colony Commissioner, Gambia.
- Shyamji Trikamji Thanki. For public services in Tanganyika.
- Hugh Haldane Thomson, District Officer, Northern Rhodesia.
- Thomasina Thomson, Matron, Queen Elizabeth's Oversea Nursing Service, Uganda.
- John Todd, MC, DFC, MB, ChB. For medical and missionary services in Northern Rhodesia.
- Janet Tomblin, Assistant Representative, British Council, Hong Kong.
- Chief Udo Ekong Umana. For public services in the Eastern Region, Nigeria.
- Namasivayam Manicka Vasagam, Financial Assistant, Public Works Department, Selangor, Federation of Malaya.
- Edwin Joseph Vass, Financial Assistant, Police Department, Singapore.
- Tom Andrew Watts, District Commissioner, Central Nyanza, Kenya.
- Wee Eric Sian Beng. For services to the Youth Movement in Singapore.
- Kathleen Hickson-Wood. For public services in Tanganyika.

Honorary Members

- Ang Keh Toh. For public services in Selangor, Federation of Malaya.
- Yang Teramat Mulia Tunku Baharom binti Sultan Abdul Hamid Halim Shah. For public services in Kedah, Federation of Malaya.
- Goh Tiong Tan. For public services in Malacca, Federation of Malaya.
- Datin Shariffah Hawa binte Khalid. For public services in Johore, Federation of Malaya.
- Ow Kheng Law, Film Director, Malayan Film Unit, Federation of Malaya.

=== Order of the Companions of Honour (CH) ===
- Henry Spencer Moore, Sculptor.

=== Companion of the Imperial Service Order (ISO) ===
Home Civil Service

- Harold Charles Birch, MBE, chief executive officer, National Savings Committee (Winchmore Hill, N21).
- Henry Bray, Principal, Ministry of Fuel & Power (Streatham, SW16).
- Albert Edward Carter, Lately Regional Finance Officer, London Postal Region, General Post Office (Leigh-on-Sea, Essex).
- William Alexander Davidson, Lately Principal, Ministry of Agriculture, Fisheries & Food (Edinburgh).
- Cyril Thornton Dean, Deputy Regional Controller, Ministry of Pensions & National Insurance (Manchester).
- John Morgan Evans, Principal Inspector, Board of Customs & Excise (Cobham, Surrey).
- Walter James Fletcher, MBE, Head of Branch, Ministry of Works (Palmers Green, N13).
- Sidney Herbert Gellatly, MBE, Grade 2 Officer, Branch B, Foreign Office (Coulsdon, Surrey).
- Henry John Hitchcock, Senior Chief Executive Officer, Board of Trade (Princes Risborough, Buckinghamshire).
- Walter Humphrey, chief executive officer, Air Ministry (Dartford, Kent).
- Colwell Iddon, OBE, Principal Executive Officer, Commonwealth Relations Office (Hythe, Kent).
- William Bryce Johnston, Principal Clerk, Board of Inland Revenue (Edinburgh).
- Ernest Long, Lately Comptroller of Income Tax, Jersey, Channel Islands.
- Bertram Arthur Nettleton, deputy director of Audit, Exchequer and Audit Department (Gidea Park, Essex).
- Rowley Thelwell North, Principal, Ministry of Supply (Upper Warlingham, Surrey).
- Bernard Peel, chief executive officer, Ministry of Transport & Civil Aviation (Southgate, N14).
- George Alfred Pepper, chief executive officer, National Assistance Board (Wallington, Surrey).
- Reginald Gordon Sheppard, chief executive officer, HM Treasury (Surbiton, Surrey).
- Francis Thomas Stobart, chief executive officer, General Register Office (Southport, Lancashire).
- William Charles Marshall Third, General Inspector, Department of Health for Scotland (Edinburgh).
- Arthur Clifford Turner, Assistant Regional Controller, East and West Ridings Region, Ministry of Labour & National Service (Leeds).
- Ernest Waldron, MBE, Acting Superintending Electrical Engineer, Admiralty (Bath).
- Arthur James Watson, Principal, Ministry of Housing & Local Government (Epsom, Surrey).
- William Harold Welkin, Lately Principal Executive Officer, Ministry of Food (Chiswick, W4).
- Edward George Yeo, chief executive officer, Ministry of Education (Finchley, N3).

Australian States

- Francis William Hicks, Superintendent, Extension and Technical Services, Department of Agriculture, State of Tasmania.
- Frederick Balfour McBryde, Master of the Supreme Court and Registrar of Probates, State of South Australia.

Oversea Civil Service

- Pierre Cantin, General Manager, Railways, Mauritius.
- Wilbur Edmund James Donovan, Accountant-General, Treasury, Fiji.
- Ronald Eustace Grant Ferguson, deputy director, Public Works Department, Western Region, Nigeria.
- Harry Handforth, Lately Assistant Works Manager, Public Works Department, Western Region, Nigeria.
- Hubert Easton Jackson, Senior Accountant, Accountant-General's Department, Uganda.
- Louis Reginald Barnett-Smith, Commissioner of Trade & Customs, North Borneo.
- Daniel Charles Arthur John Thomas, Lately Secretary to the General Manager, Railways, Sierra Leone.

=== British Empire Medal (BEM) ===
Military Division

Royal Navy

- Quartermaster Sergeant Leslie Barker, Ch.X.834, Royal Marines.
- Chief Electrical Artificer Charles William Barnwell, C/MX.46103.
- Chief Engine Room Artificer Frederick Cecil Barratt, C/MX.48911.
- Chief Shipwright Percival William Brenton, D/MX.55111.
- Quartermaster Sergeant Frederick Charles Briars, Ply.X.989, Royal Marines.
- Chief Wren Grace Mary Brown, 1081, Women's Royal Naval Service.
- Chief Engine Room Artificer Norman Herbert Anthony Brown, P/MX.50010.
- Chief Petty Officer Cook (O) William Henry Crowther, D/MX.50455.
- Chief Engineering Mechanic Francis Ralph Davenport, D/KX.86547.
- Colour Sergeant Thomas Henry Duffield, Ch.X.370, Royal Marines.
- Chief Engine Room Artificer William Thomas Fedrick, D/MX.56725.
- Master-at-Arms Claud Thompson Foster D/MX.48937.
- Petty Officer James Greenshields, C/JX.135163.
- Chief Petty Officer Telegraphist Harold Percy Hill, W.R.2006, RNV(W)R.
- Chief Petty Officer Husein Ibrahim, No Kai, Royal East African Navy.
- Chief Airman Fitter (E) Sidney James Jenkins L/FX.79745.
- Chief Petty Officer William Alfred Keeler, C/JX.125086.
- Chief Ordnance Artificer Albert George Kelsey, P/MX.54858.
- Chief Petty Officer Telegraphist Arthur William John Layer, D/JX.130726.
- Chief Petty Officer Frank Kenneth Lewis L/FX.76295.
- Chief Wren Marie Isabella McLachlan, 47462, Women's Royal Naval Service.
- Chief Electrician William Vernon Mersh Moore, P/MX.803894.
- Chief Engine Room Artificer Harry Edward Pook, P/MX.48728.
- Chief Petty Officer Writer George Vivian Richards, C/MX.60902.
- Chief Petty Officer Wilfred Ernest Sketchell, D/JX.251323.
- Chief Engine Room Artificer Maurice George Strevens Skinner, D/MX.59207.
- Engine Room Artificer1st Class Cyril Alfred Sothcott, D/MX.55214.
- Chief Petty Officer Walter Arthur Francis Thompson, C/JX129481.
- Sick Berth Chief Petty Officer Bernard John Townsend, C/MX.50451.
- Chief Petty Officer Writer James Edward Triscott, D/MX.50618.
- Chief Petty Officer Cecil Trounce, C/J.96950.
- Stores Chief Petty Officer (S) Douglas Henry Hamblyn Tuckett, D/MX.57970.

Army

- Colour-Sergeant (acting) Roch Alexander Aeria, Federation of Malaya Volunteer Reconnaissance Corps.
- 65250 Sergeant Kossah Affel, Sierra Leone Regiment, Royal West African Frontier Force.
- 4388414 Staff-Sergeant James Hall Albertson, Corps of Royal Military Police.
- 22237714 Warrant Officer Class II (acting) William James Allen, Corps of Royal Electrical & Mechanical Engineers.
- W/206355 Sergeant Ellen Mary Arnold, Women's Royal Army Corps.
- 1814657 Sergeant Frederick Charles Baker, Royal Regiment of Artillery.
- 840378 Sergeant Arthur Frank Barker, Royal Regiment of Artillery.
- Sergeant Frank Thomas David Barton, 2nd Huntingdonshire Battalion, Home Guard.
- W/360597 Sergeant (acting) Elizabeth Blythan, Women's Royal Army Corps.
- 22261061 Sergeant John Thomas Bowes, Royal Regiment of Artillery, Territorial Army.
- 893715 Warrant Officer Class II (acting) Frank Bowles, Corps of Royal Electrical & Mechanical Engineers.
- 22258246 Warrant Officer Class II (acting) Peter William Bryant, Royal Army Medical Corps.
- 2717570 Sergeant Richard Burke, Irish Guards.
- ZBK.12019 Warrant Officer Jameson Moses Bweteka, 1st (Nyasaland) Battalion, The King's African Rifles.
- S/22280085 Staff-Sergeant (acting) Joseph Francis Carter, Royal Army Service Corps, Territorial Army.
- 1547532 Sergeant Joseph Collett, Army Catering Corps.
- 22566223 Staff-Sergeant Ernest James Cooper, Corps of Royal Electrical & Mechanical Engineers, Territorial Army.
- T/5123307 Sergeant John Hunter Cummings, Royal Army Service Corps.
- W/7602 Sergeant Hannah Mary Dent, Women's Royal Army Corps.
- 1374581 Warrant Officer Class II (acting) Thomas Roye Dinsdale, Corps of Royal Engineers.
- 2067823 Warrant Officer Class II (acting) Roland Henry Goldsmith, Corps of Royal Engineers.
- 7343610 Staff-Sergeant Charles Ralph Gregory, Royal Regiment of Artillery, Territorial Army.
- 7601448 Warrant Officer Class II (acting) Ronald James Hart, Royal Army Ordnance Corps.
- 6010999 Staff-Sergeant (acting) (local Warrant Officer Class II) Percy Heard, Corps of Royal Electrical & Mechanical Engineers.
- 7666672 Staff-Sergeant John Hull, Royal Army Pay Corps.
- 3446319 Sergeant Richard Johnson, Corps of Royal Military Police.
- 5330187 Sergeant Alfred Nelson May, The Royal Berkshire Regiment (Princess Charlotte of Wales's), Territorial Army.
- 22309646 Sergeant John McCaffrey, Corps of Royal Engineers.
- 22271881 Sergeant David McDonald, The Royal Ulster Rifles, Territorial Army.
- 22149169 Armament Staff-Sergeant Robert Brian Millgate, Corps of Royal Electrical & Mechanical Engineers.
- Band-Sergeant Arthur Sullivan Nibbs, Jamaica Military Band.
- 21005277 Sergeant Thomas Patrick Nicholls, Royal Corps of Signals.
- 21130836 Colour-Sergeant Herbert Frank Oliver, The Monmouthshire Regiment, Territorial Army.
- 4855022 Staff-Sergeant (Artillery Clerk) George Herbert Parker, Royal Regiment of Artillery, Territorial Army.
- 3652055 Colour-Sergeant (acting) Eric Percival, The South Lancashire Regiment (Prince of Wales's Volunteers).
- 14315766 Staff-Sergeant Leslie Powdrell, Royal Army Pay Corps.
- Armourer Rajiman bin Ali, Singapore Volunteer Corps.
- 22266362 Staff-Sergeant (acting) William Rhodes, Royal Army Ordnance Corps.
- 22253241 Sergeant Cook Robert Rodgers, Army Catering Corps, Territorial Army.
- 408684 Warrant Officer Class II (acting) Patrick Michael Rooney, Army Catering Corps.
- 1507419 Staff-Sergeant (Artillery Clerk) Harry Challis Sandford, Royal Regiment of Artillery.
- W/69659 Staff-Sergeant Vera Schofield, Women's Royal Army Corps.
- 2331857 Warrant Officer Class II (acting) Frederick Sidney Shepherd, Royal Corps of Signals.
- 5723836 Warrant Officer Class II (acting) Cecil Lewis Arthur Siegel, The Dorset Regiment.
- S/14446352 Sergeant (acting) Charles Harry Sorensen, Royal Army Service Corps.
- 6139081 Warrant Officer Class II (acting) Gerald Sidney Taylor, Corps of Royal Military Police.
- 22540914 Sergeant Ernest Thomas, Royal Corps of Signals.
- W/367953 Sergeant Olive Thompson, Women's Royal Army Corps, Territorial Army.
- 2590110 Sergeant Robert George Upton, Royal Corps of Signals, Territorial Army.
- 22529382 Warrant Officer Class II (acting) Thomas Varty, Royal Regiment of Artillery.
- 22566405 Sergeant (acting) (local Warrant Officer Class II) Frank James William Vingoe, Royal Regiment of Artillery, Territorial Army.
- 22224223 Staff-Sergeant Frederick Penistan Wiley, Royal Army Medical Corps, Territorial Army.
- Na/27952 Company-Sergeant-Major Yako Yerwa, The Nigeria Regiment, Royal West African Frontier Force.
- 1882128 Warrant Officer Class II (acting) Edmond Francis Rouen Young, Corps of Royal Engineers.

In recognition of services in Korea during the period 1 August 1954 to 31 January 1955.

- S/11252946 Staff Sergeant George Alexander Wilson, Royal Army Service Corps.
- 22844618 Sapper (Acting Lance Corporal) William Norritt Stewart Lawson, Royal Engineers.

Royal Air Force

- 2683530 Flight Sergeant John Bell, Royal Auxiliary Air Force.
- 518510 Flight Sergeant John Kitchener Crowther.
- 564666 Flight Sergeant Thomas Glassbrook.
- 637983 Right Sergeant Harry Ronald Grimes.
- 512721 Flight Sergeant George William Hearn.
- 1100484 Flight Sergeant Roy Hewitt.
- 958812 Flight Sergeant Stanley Banyard Hicks.
- 576422 Flight Sergeant William John Hill.
- 564263 Flight Sergeant John Felix Moore.
- 519189 Flight Sergeant Thomas Henry Phillis.
- 428346 Flight Sergeant Dorothy Gladys Rice, Women's Royal Air Force.
- 566891 Right Sergeant Anthony Scriven.
- 565961 Right Sergeant Ronald David Stephens.
- 564848 Right Sergeant George Turner.
- 517678 Right Sergeant Frank Denzil Ward.
- 2682547 Flight Sergeant Wilfred Frederick Webb, Royal Auxiliary Air Force.
- 524504 Flight Sergeant Jack Windebank.
- 639429 Chief Technician Thomas Flynn.
- 574728 Chief Technician George Walter Lambert.
- 582354 Acting Right Sergeant Jack Graham Nicholson.
- 1269002 Sergeant Stanley George Blacklock.
- 613177 Sergeant Tegwyn Brice.
- 4027099 Sergeant Alfred Callis.
- 2262852 Sergeant Walter Derek Cooksey.
- 645038 Sergeant Sydney John Cornwall.
- 550622 Sergeant Arthur Richard Darnell.
- 914548 Sergeant Raymond West Dennis.
- 545604 Sergeant Frederick Hugh England.
- 568553 Sergeant Leslie Gwynne Evans.
- 592075 Sergeant Henry John Foster.
- 1188259 Sergeant Ronald Albert Colder.
- 1340629 Sergeant John Boyd Nicol.
- 578089 Sergeant Eric Cadwaladr Owen.
- 1200298 Sergeant William Rush.
- 628330 Sergeant John Ronald Wright.
- 4025035 Senior Technician Edward Frederick Bull.
- 2352126 Acting Sergeant Stanley Hawkes.
- 3501242 Acting Sergeant Arthur Charles Miles.
- 1202177 Corporal Leonard Usher Burrows.
- 2207386 Corporal James Henry McLeod Kerr.
- 4089345 Corporal James Mitchell Paterson.
- 4029710 Corporal Cyril Potter.
- 4028023 Corporal Gordon Frederick Spittal.
- 540187 Corporal Andrew Archibald Wilson.
- 2131353 Senior Aircraftwoman Ivy Lilian Ellen Hunt, Women's Royal Air Force.

Civil Division

United Kingdom

- Frederick Pattinson Agar, Divisional Superintendent, St John Ambulance Brigade, County of Durham.
- Sydney Francis Alexander, Technical Officer, Post Office Research Station, Dollis Hill. (Cricklewood, NW2).
- Ada Allcorn, County Clothing Officer, Durham, Women's Voluntary Services. (Hetton-le-Hole).
- George Trail Allen, Foreman Fitter, British Aluminium Co. Ltd., Falkirk. (Grangemouth).
- William Thomas Andrews, Colliery Overman, International Colliery, South Western Division, National Coal Board. (Aberkenfig, Glamorgan).
- James Harbron Archbold, MM, Deputy Overman, Eppleton Colliery, Durham Division, National Coal Board. (Houghton-le-Spring).
- William John Arkinstall, Millwrights Foreman, Universal Grinding Wheel Co. Ltd. (Stafford).
- Sam Auty, Engine Driver, Royston, North Eastern Region, British Railways. (Barnsley).
- Alfred Christopher Bagnall, Welfare Assistant, Steel, Peech and Tozer, United Steel Companies Ltd. (Rotherham).
- Douglas Francis Ball, Chief Inspector, Kirkstall Forge Engineering Ltd., Leeds.
- Frank William Barlow, Foreman, Morris Motors Ltd., Coventry.
- Harry Barnes, Weaving Manager, Birtwistle & Oddie Ltd. (Blackburn).
- John Patrick Barrett, Mechanic Examiner, Naval Ordnance Inspection Department, Admiralty. (Portsmouth).
- Cecil Frederick Bedford, Office Keeper, Grade II, HM Treasury. (Morden Park, Surrey).
- Ernest Birket, Foreman Cutter, Royal Marines Clothing Centre, Chatham. (Gillingham).
- Bernard Boam, Brickmaker, Butterley Co. Ltd., Ripley, Derbyshire.
- George Brown, Cookery Instructor, Grade I, School of Cookery, RAF Halton. (Tring, Hertfordshire).
- James Philip Bullen, Chief Officer, Class II, HM Prison Edinburgh.
- George Burn, Stoneman, Mainsforth Colliery, Durham Division, National Coal Board. (Ferryhill Station).
- Ella Dora Alma Caley, Collector, Street Savings Group, Durham City.
- Angus Cameron, Watchman, SS Largs Bay, Donaldson Atlantic Lines Ltd. (Glasgow).
- Sidney Carr, Coal Filler, Bates Colliery, Northern (Northumberland & Cumberland) Division, National Coal Board. (Blyth).
- Walter Charles Casey, Foreman Shipwright, Cardiff Channel Dry Docks & Pontoon Co. Ltd., Cardiff.
- Edith Maud Cason, Deputy County Organiser, Yorkshire West Riding, Women's Voluntary Services. (Leeds).
- Alfred Chalk, Inspector of Flushing, London County Council. (Clapham, SW4).
- James Edward Challons, Technical Officer, Grade III, Foreign Office.
- Percy William Charles, General Foreman, De Havilland Engine Co. Ltd. (Stanmore, Middlesex).
- Azariah Clarke, Overman, Holditch Colliery, West Midlands Division, National Coal Board. (Newcastle-under-Lyme).
- Annie Coleman, Collector, Street Savings Group, Belfast.
- Francis Henry Collett, Non-Technical Class, Grade II, Royal Ordnance Factory, Woolwich. (Welling, Kent).
- Ernest Seaford Cook, Works Superintendent, Johnson & Phillips Ltd. (Redhill, Surrey).
- John Cookson, Chief Tester, Unit Tool & Engineering Co. Ltd., Blackpool.
- Alexander Fraser Cross, Linesman, North of Scotland Hydro-Electric Board. (Lanbryde, Moray).
- Margaret Isabel White Curtis, Supervisor (F), Cardiff Telephone Exchange, General Post Office.
- James Davidson, Chief Inspector, Head Post Office, Aberdeen.
- Catherine Davies, Collector, Street Savings Group, Llandudno.
- George Davies, Suede Buffing Foreman, Treforest Chrome Leather Works. (Pontypridd).
- Harry Southcott Davies, Grid Main Supervisor, Wales Gas Board. (Caerphilly, Glamorgan).
- John Davies, Chief Officer, HM Prison Birmingham.
- Charles Denny, Tanker Driver, Express Dairy Co. Ltd. (Kentish Town, NW5).
- Dora Beatrice Derham, Ward Sister, St Crispin's Hospital (Mental), Duston, Northampton.
- Frederick Dowell, First Aid Attendant, Leicester Generating Station, East Midlands Division, British Electricity Authority.
- Ernest Stanley Drake, Inspector, Birmingham City Police Force.
- Henry Robert Dudley, Postman, London Parcel Section, General Post Office. (Morden, Surrey).
- Robert Beattie Dunnett, Sergeant, Caithness-shire Constabulary. (Wick).
- Ernest Walter Dunster, Office Keeper, Grade II, Scottish Office. (Upper Norwood, SE19).
- Weldon Earl, Operating Assistant, Shell Petroleum Co. Ltd. (Shell Haven, Essex).
- Ernest Eaton, Night Supervisor, Rossie Farm School, Montrose.
- William Fairhurst, Foreman, Electronic Tubes Ltd., High Wycombe. (Enfield, Middlesex).
- Joseph Henry Fell, School Staff Instructor, Nottingham High School.
- Albert Spring Westlake Fenwick, Head Foreman Shipwright, J. I. Thornycroft Ltd., Southampton.
- James Foster, Established Engine Fitter, Admiralty. (Glasgow).
- Mena Gay French, Collector, Savings Group, Odhams Press. (Thornton Heath, Surrey).
- Archibald Frost, Leading Stoker, Dunston "B" Power Station, North Eastern Division, British Electricity Authority. (Gateshead).
- William Thomas Futcher, Supervisor, Admiralty Telephone Exchange, Portsmouth.
- Julian Elias Gage, Civilian Warrant Officer, No.56 (Woolwich) Squadron, Air Training Corps. (Plumstead, SE18).
- Frank William Gale, Foreman Blacksmith, Aldwarke Main Colliery, North Eastern Division, National Coal Board. (Rotherham).
- Horace Robert Gale, JP, Signalman (Special Class" A"), Warrington, London Midland Region, British Railways.
- William Gibbison, Detective Chief Inspector, Bootle Borough Police Force.
- William Richard Gibbs, Sewage Treatment Foreman, London County Council. (Belvedere, Kent).
- Edward William Gittins, Boatswain, SS Crofter, T. & J. Harrison Ltd. (Liverpool).
- Irene Goodwin, Home Help, County Borough of Rotherham.
- Thomas William Gough, Craftsman I, Tate Gallery. (East Ham, E6).
- Leonard Brammer Gould, Technician, Class I, Telephone Manager's Office, Stoke-on-Trent.
- Wilfred Gregg, Acting Engineer, Wm. Ewart & Sons Ltd., Belfast.
- Catherine Hague, Manageress, War Department Laundry, Netley. (Southampton).
- Charles Leslie Hampton, Inspector, Class I, Western Region, British Railways. (Hayes, Middlesex).
- Cordelia Harris, Collector, Upper Lime Street Savings Group, Gorseinon, Glamorganshire.
- James Norman Harrison, Inspector of Electrical Fitters, Admiralty. (Gillingham, Kent).
- John Arthur Lawrence Harrison, Shop Foreman, Robert Jenkins & Co. Ltd., Rotherham.
- Thomas Harvey, Surface Screenhand, Coppice Colliery, East Midlands Division, National Coal Board. (Ilkeston, Derbyshire).
- Jane Tweddle Herron, Manageress, NAAFI Other Ranks' Club, Berlin.
- John Heveran, Donkeyman, Greaser, MV Wayfarer, Thos. & Jas. Harrison Ltd. (Liverpool).
- George Hewitt, Stoneman, Brandon Colliery, Durham Division, National Coal Board. (Brandon).
- Priscilla Kirby Hewlett, Welfare Supervisor, J. Cawthra & Co. Ltd., Bradford.
- George Hilderley, Foreman, National Fruit Trials, Wisley. (Woking, Surrey).
- Charles Reuben Hill, Charging Machine Driver, Avon Street Gasworks, Bristol, South Western Gas Board.
- John McGregor Hislop, Sub-Officer, Central Fire Brigade, Stirling.
- Thomas Harrison Hobkirk, Foreman Instructor, North Eastern Electricity Board. (Newcastle upon Tyne).
- William Harry Hodges, Ammunition Foreman, Proof and Experimental Establishment, Ministry of Supply, Shoeburyness.
- Percy James Holdaway, Chief Baker, SS Alcantara, Royal Mail Lines Ltd. (Southampton).
- Mary Irene Holland, Canteen Manageress, War Office. (London, W1).
- Ernest James Horscroft, Station Officer, HM Coastguard Station, St Ives, Cornwall.
- George Horsley, Laboratory Mechanic, Admiralty Fuel Experimental Station, Haslar, Hampshire. (Portsmouth).
- Robert Fearne Hughes, Station Officer, Anglesey Fire Brigade.
- Robert Jackson, Custodian, Caernarvon Castle, Ministry of Works.
- Herbert John Jarvis, Travelling Superintendent Gardener, French District Imperial War Graves Commission.
- John Herbert Jenkins, Draughtsman, General Post Office. (Homsey, N8).
- Robert John Wilfred Johnson, Engineering Superintendent, Reading Gas Works, Southern Gas Board.
- Walter Johnston, Estate Mechanic, Government House, Hillsborough, County Down.
- Glynne William Jones, Clerk of Works (Works Technical Grade II), RAF Wattisham.
- Walter Charles Jouhning, Chief Warder, Geological Survey and Museum, Department of Scientific & Industrial Research. (Abbey Wood, SE2).
- Stephen Henry Kelcey, Seaman, Northern Lighthouse Board. (Edinburgh).
- Thomas Gilbert Kenvyn, Commandant, Newport Borough Special Constabulary.
- Charles Key, Foreman Joiner (Surface), Babbington Colliery, East Midlands Division, National Coal Board. (Cinderhill, Nottinghamshire).
- Thomas Ernest Kirk, River Foreman, Nene River Board, Lincolnshire (Holland) and Northamptonshire. (Wisbech).
- Reginald George Knights, Chief Engineer, Steam Trawler Leonard, East Coast Fish Sales Co. Ltd., Lowestoft. (Oulton Broad, Norfolk).
- George William Thomas Lacey, Leading Chargehand, City Engineer's Department, Bristol.
- Frederick William Rowsill Lee, Instrument Maker, Royal Aircraft Establishment, Ministry of Supply. (Farnham, Surrey).
- Leonard Joseph Lee, Works and District Foreman, Billingshurst, South Eastern Gas Board.
- John Percival Leslie, Sergeant (CID) Dock Police, Port of London Authority. (Dagenham, Essex).
- John Duffield Lisher, JP, Signalman, Hardham Junction Signal Box, Pulborough, Southern Region, British Railways. (Pulborough, Sussex).
- Samuel Littlewood, Foreman Meter Collector, Derby Undertaking, East Midlands Gas Board.
- Eric Lloyd, Commandant, Warwick Detachment, British Red Cross Society. (Coventry).
- Henry Lloyd, Semi-Skilled Operative (Storeman II), Royal Ordnance Factories, Woolwich. (Laindon, Essex).
- William David Henry Lockerby, Technical Officer, Radio Telephony Terminal, General Post Office. (St Albans).
- Basil John Campbell Longden, Inspector, Metropolitan Special Constabulary. (Chislehurst, Kent).
- Alice Mary Macdonald, Member, Women's Voluntary Services, Eastern District Headquarters, Scotland. (Newtyle, Angus).
- George Russell Mackenzie. For public and social services in Morayshire. (Forres).
- Charles Edward Maidment, Inspector, Yorkshire (East Riding) Constabulary. (Beverley).
- Norman Mallinson, General Foreman, Samuel Wilkinson & Sons Ltd. (Elland, Yorkshire).
- Frederick Ernest Maltby, Senior Assistant (Scientific), Long Ashton Research Station. (Bristol).
- Charles Marriott, Stoneworker, Sutton Colliery, East Midlands Division National Coal Board. (Sutton-in-Ashfield).
- Alfred Marrison, Chief Officer, HM Prison Wormwood Scrubs.
- John Mason, Foreman of Stores, No.3 Maintenance Unit, RAF Ruislip. (Hayes End, Middlesex).
- Roderick Matheson, Chief Inspector, War Department Constabulary, Royal Ordnance Factory, Swynnerton. (Stone, Staffordshire).
- Frederick William Matthews, Foreman Fitter, London Division, British Electricity Authority. (Southall, Middlesex).
- Reginald Robert Middleton, Driver, Norwich Group, Eastern Division, British Road Services Board of Management.
- Harry Miller, Chief Warden, Swansea Civil Defence Corps.
- James Veitch Miller, Warehouseman, William Sim & Sons, Leith.
- James Milligan, Foreman, Stevenson & Son Ltd., Dungannon, County Tyrone.
- James Philip Mills, Passenger Guard, King's Cross, Eastern Region, British Railways. (Old Southgate, N14).
- Thomas Hamilton Monk, Collector, Carsington Gardens Street Savings Group, Dartford.
- Sarah Elizabeth Moore, Supervisor (Telephones), Head Post Office, Doncaster, Yorkshire.
- Peter Barlow Morris, Chief Inspector, George Mann & Co. Ltd., Leeds.
- James Morrison, Head Foreman Plumber, Harland & Wolff Ltd., Belfast.
- Cyril Russell Myford, Foreman-Storekeeper, Hertfordshire County Agricultural Executive Committee. (Enfield).
- Frank Henry Nash, Regimental Sergeant Major, Cadet Battalion, Royal Sussex Regiment. (Chichester, Sussex).
- Thomas Ralph Nelson, Observer, No.11 Group, Truro, Royal Observer Corps. (St Columb, Cornwall).
- Donald Bradley Nicholson, Chargehand Meter Mechanician, Yorkshire Electricity Board. (Kingston-upon-Hull).
- Norman North, Maintenance Engineer, British Oil & Cake Mills Ltd., Erith. (Bexley Heath, Kent).
- Ernest Palmer, Canteen Manager, NAAFI, Royal Naval Air Station, Arbroath. (Battersea, SWll).
- Kathleen Mary Pearce, Chief Supervisor (F), Temple Bar Telephone Exchange, General Post Office. (Ilford, Essex).
- Norman Alfred Pearce, Communications Officer, Northampton Civil Defence Corps. (Little Billing).
- John Peter Pearson, Stonemason, W. Woodsend Ltd., Nottingham.
- William Henry Peplow, Compositor, Wilding & Son Ltd. (Shrewsbury).
- Lawrence Peterson, Chargeman Boilermaker, Wm. Gray & Co. Ltd., West Hartlepool.
- Idris Pope, Haulage-engineman and Rope Splicer, Aberbeeg South Colliery, South Western Division, National Coal Board. (Llanhilleth, Monmouthshire).
- Frank Prime, Driller, Yarrow & Co. Ltd., Scotstoun, Glasgow.
- Robert S. Ramsey, Head Yardman and Chief Marker, Perth Auction Market, Macdonald, Fraser & Co. Ltd. (Perth).
- George Herbert Reasbeck, Papermaker's Help, John Rostron & Sons Ltd., Selby.
- Laurence Smith Reid, Member, Coast Life Saving Corps, Walls, Shetland. (Lerwick).
- Horace Stanley Reynolds, Distribution Foreman, Keighley, North Eastern Gas Board.
- William Richardson, Senior Blacksmith, Birtley Co. Ltd., Birtley. (Gateshead).
- John Ritchie, Chargehand Linesman, North of Scotland Hydro-Electric Board. (Cove Bay, Kincardineshire).
- Frank Roberts, Underground Repairer, Emley Moor Colliery, North Eastern Division, National Coal Board. (Huddersfield).
- Harold Henry Roberts, Inspector (Mechanical), Wilts & Dorset Motor Service Ltd. (Tilling Group). (Salisbury).
- Harry Roberts, Warden, Territorial Army Headquarters St Helens.
- Marjorie Roberts, JP, Centre Organiser, Denbigh Borough, Women's Voluntary Services.
- Thomas Edward Roberts, Farm Foreman, Llysfasi Farm Institute, Ruthin, Denbighshire.
- Harold Robertson, Radio Technician, No.20 Maintenance Unit, RAF Aston Down. (Cirencester, Gloucester).
- Thomas Rogers, Mess Steward Grade I, Headquarters, No.23 Group, RAF Leighton Buzzard. (Wein, Shropshire).
- John Watson Rogerson, Foreman, Stead McAlpin & Co. Ltd. (Carlisle).
- John Cameron Ross, Training Officer, Balgonie Colliery, Scottish Division, National Coal Board. (Balgonie, Fifeshire).
- Jabez Rostance, Shop Foreman and Maintenance Engineer, John Jardine Ltd., Nottingham.
- Sydney Albert Rowley, Foreman, Newton Bros (Derby) Ltd. (Derby).
- Andrew Jacob Sandison, Sub-Postmaster, Mid Yell, Lerwick, Shetland.
- Walter Scott, Engineer-in-Charge, Lots Road Pumping Station, London County Council. (West Brompton, SW10).
- Walter Henry Shacklady, Tank Wagon Driver, Esso Petroleum Co. Ltd. (Poplar, E14).
- Rupert Eric George Simcox, Mains Foreman, North Western Electricity Board. (Alderley Edge, Cheshire).
- George Alfred Smith, Engineering Fitter, Ministry of Works. (Norbury, S W16).
- Harold Samuel Smith, Engine Room Foreman, Nechells "A" Station, Midlands Division, British Electricity Authority. (Birmingham).
- William Smith, Linesman, North of Scotland Hydro-Electric Board. (Thurso).
- Cecil Kenneth Spencer, Technical Officer, Post Office, Bournemouth. (Christchurch).
- Thomas William Spencer, Quarry Engineering Worker, Derbyshire Stone Ltd., Matlock.
- William Alexander Starritt, Head Constable, Royal Ulster Constabulary. (Londonderry).
- Earnest William Alfred Steadman, Station Warden, RAF Hucknall, Nottinghamshire.
- David Stirling, Sub-District Commandant, Ulster Special Constabulary. (Muckamore, County Antrim).
- Ethel Louise Stubbs, Collector, Brunts Grammar School Savings Group, Mansfield.
- Neil David Sutherland, Inspector and Deputy Chief Constable, Caithness-shire Constabulary. (Wick).
- James Swan, MM, Foreman and Development Manager, George MacLellan & Co. Ltd., Glasgow.
- George Henry Tanner, Mains Foreman, Hastings District, South Eastern Electricity Board.
- Charles Taylor, Craftsman, Imperial War Museum. (Southfields, SW18).
- Charles Taylor, Head Loftsman, Blyth Dry Docks & Shipbuilding Co. Ltd., Blyth.
- Gwendoline Laura Taylor, Supervisor (F) Telephones, Head Post Office, Walsall, Staffordshire.
- Ernest Temperley, Collector, Street Savings Group, Middleton, Lancashire.
- Henry Thompson, Sub-Postmaster, Barlborough, Chesterfield, Derbyshire.
- Florence Mary Ann Thorp, Forelady, Cellular Clothing Co. Ltd. (Nottingham).
- John Thomas Toplis, Foreman Pests Operator, Derbyshire Agricultural Executive Committee. (Wirksworth).
- Wilfred Henry Trant, Established Recorder, Admiralty. (Plymouth).
- Rose Elizabeth Tuck. For public and social services in Banbury, Oxfordshire.
- Frederick Charles Unwin, Able Seaman of Yard Craft, Admiralty. (Southsea).
- Alfred Robert George Varndell, Assistant Divisional Officer, London Fire Brigade. (Clerkenwell, EC1).
- Samuel Vaughan, JP, Ripper (Underground), Gresford Colliery, North Western Division, National Coal Board. (Wrexham).
- Thomas John Walker, Drainer, Breconshire Agricultural Executive Committee. (Sennybridge).
- William Wallace, Steward, Royal Engineers Headquarter Mess, War Office, Chatham.
- David Mitchell Wardlaw, Chief Mechanical Engineer, Whitrigg Colliery, Scottish Division, National Coal Board. (Whitburn, West Lothian).
- John William Waterhouse, Supervisor II, Administrative Detachment, Control Commission for Germany.
- Charles Webb, Surface Worker, Lucy No.4 Colliery, South Western Division, National Coal Board. (Merthyr Tydfil).
- James Walter Webb, Superintendent of Ambulance Room, Firth Vickers Stainless Steels Ltd., Sheffield.
- William Wesson, Research and Experimental Mechanic (Special) Chargehand, Proof and Experimental Establishment, Ministry of Supply, Melton Mowbray.
- Charles Percival West, Foreman, Royal Electrical & Mechanical Engineers Workshop, War Office. (Lenton, Nottinghamshire).
- Elizabeth White, Matron, Greenmount Agricultural College, Muckamore, County Antrim.
- John Henry Whittaker, Inspector (Postal), Head Post Office, Rochdale.
- Donald George Wickenden, Laboratory Worker "A", Atomic Weapons Research Establishment, Fort Halstead, Kent.
- Robert Hutchison Wilkie, Manager, Central Scottish Branch, Lord Roberts Workshops. (Dundee).
- Elsie Wilkins, Postal and Telegraph Officer (F), Head Post Office, Wimborne, Dorset.
- Elizabeth Mary Williams, Sub-Postmistress, St Weonards, Hereford.
- Ellen Blanche Wilson, Member, Nottinghamshire County Staff, Women's Voluntary Services. (Nottingham).
- George Bradbury Wright, Instructional Officer, Grade 1, Felling Industrial Rehabilitation Centre, Ministry of Labour & National Service. (Sunderland).
- William John Wright, Retort House Foreman, Poplar Works, North Thames Gas Board. (East Ham, E6).
- George Alfred Wyatt, Overseer, Head Post Office, Redhill, Surrey.

State of South Australia

- Herman Behrndt, lately. Foreman, Botanic Garden, Adelaide.

Swaziland

- Dabede Dlamini, Native Court President, Swaziland.
- John Mfundza Brighton Sukati, Rural Development Officer, Swaziland.

Oversea Territories

- Sylvia Geraldine Richardson, Nurse, Public Health Department, Bermuda.
- Claude Frederick Torrezao, Chief Inspector, Society for the Prevention of Cruelty to Animals, British Guiana.
- Christodoulos Mouscos, Mukhtar, Cyprus.
- Lai Khan, Leading Artisan, East African Railways and Harbours Administration.
- Harold Jordan Willoughby, Works Superintendent (Roads), Fiji.
- Samuel Kotei Djanie, Artisan, Koforidua, Gold Coast.
- Hau Ho, Forester, Hong Kong.
- Lydia Eugenie Pringle, Acting Sister, Government Nursing Service, Jamaica.
- Chief Chrysostom s/o Kihage, Chief of Screening Team, Bahati Resistance Centre, Kenya.
- Sebi Fadamulla, Inspector, Kenya Police Force.
- Jones Samuel Fondo, Secretary/ Treasurer, Giriama African District Council, Kilifi, Kenya.
- Elizabeth Fraser Kydd, Radio Operator, Kenya Police Reserve.
- Eli Okwaro Ochieng, Chief Warder, Prison Service, Kenya.
- Ira Averson Smith, Local Constable and Government Agent, Anegada, British Virgin Islands, Leeward Islands.
- Agnes Bong, Telephone Supervisor, Federal Police Headquarters, Federation of Malaya.
- Ism Ibin Ismail, lately State Elections Officer, Johore, Federation of Malaya.
- Low Yoke Cheng, Junior Civil Liaison Officer, Negri Sembilan, Federation of Malaya.
- Mah Thai Lak, Police Clerk and Interpreter, Federation of Malaya.
- Mohammed Abdul Maud, Technician, Drainage and Irrigation Department, Federation of Malaya.
- Mat Yunus (Puteh) bin Awang, Senior Assistant, Department of Aborigines, Federation of Malaya.
- Sinnathamby s/o Periathamby, Head Overseer, Anti-Malarial Works, Kuala Lumpur, Federation of Malaya.
- Sudin bin Kamaludin, lately Forest Ranger, Forest Department, Federation of Malaya.
- Tam bin Mat Aras, Earth Moving Plant Operator, Federation of Malaya.
- Haji Yakim bin Haji Kari, Adjutant, Batu Kurau Home Guard, Perak, Federation of Malaya.
- Sooadick Ameer Maudarbaccus, Sub-Inspector Mauritius Police Force.
- John Afolabi Arokodare, Chief Clerk, Ekiti Divisional Native Authority, Western Region, Nigeria.
- Obong Anwan Obong, Assistant Nursing Sister, Medical Department, Western Region, Nigeria.
- Samat bin Mohamed Noor, Chargehand Wireman, Jesselton Electrical Undertaking, North Borneo.
- Chimputu Shilling, Head Messenger, Gwembe, Northern Rhodesia.
- Henry Knight, Acting Chief Roads Supervisor, Public Works Department, Nyasaland.
- Haji Mohamed Nur bin Mohamed Ghous, Herbarium and Museum Assistant, Botanic Gardens, Singapore.
- Hersi Dualeh, Agricultural Assistant, Agricultural Department, Somaliland.
- Haji Deria Mohamoud, Assistant Interpreter, District Administration, Somaliland.
- Rebecca d/o Noah, Village Midwife, Upare Native Authority, Pare District, Tanganyika.
- Juma bin Khamis, Head Messenger, Public Works Department, Zanzibar.

=== Royal Victorian Medal (RVM) ===
Gold

- Fred Naylor.

Silver

- Alfred Ernest Giles.
- Victor St. Clair Habgood.
- Chief Petty Officer Douglas Henry Hawkins, P/J105891.
- Chief Electrical Artificer Albert Percy Jones, P/M35413.
- Alexander Grant McPherson.
- Albert Harry Riches.
- Alfred Herman Soen.
- Edward James Sturgess.
- Police Constable Walter Stanley Tompkins, Metropolitan Police Force.
- Police Constable James Young, Metropolitan Police Force.

=== Royal Red Cross (RRC) ===
- Major Edith Constance Long (206282), Queen Alexandra's Royal Army Nursing Corps.

==== Associate of the Royal Red Cross (ARRC) ====
- Ada Agnes Elizabeth Burman, Superintending Sister, Queen Alexandra's Royal Naval Nursing Service.
- Vera Ellen Ponter, VAD Commandant.
- Captain Ardudfyl Jones (336813), Queen Alexandra's Royal Army Nursing Corps.
- Major Gweneth Elisabeth Jones (206250), Queen Alexandra's Royal Army Nursing Corps.
- Major Margaret Mary Morris (257800), Queen Alexandra's Royal Army Nursing Corps.
- Squadron Officer Doris Mary Trick (405532), Princess Mary's Royal Air Force Nursing Service.
- Flight Officer Dorothy Wilcox (406583), Princess Mary's Royal Air Force Nursing Service.

=== Air Force Cross (AFC) ===
Wing Commander

- Robert Brian Morison, DFC (33516).

Squadron Leaders

- Sidney Charles Dunmore (53194).
- Henri Joseph Franklin (127335).
- William Harbison (133668).
- Cyril Raymond Johnson (153413).
- David Charles Saunders (125573).
- John Adam Sowrey, DFC (33551).
- William Proctor Swaby (55115).

Flight Lieutenants

- Kenneth James Chase (578613).
- Edmund Cheek, DFM (54132).
- Michael Wellinger Cross (1582107).
- Peter Morgan Fletcher (500413).
- Dennis Percy Francis McCAi G (155772).
- Horatio Ogilvie (59357).
- Maurice Short (579101).
- The Honourable Peter Beckford Rutgers Vanneck (205378), Royal Auxiliary Air Force.
- Norman Alexander Wickes, DFC (501546).
- Francis Richard Wood (1593551).
- Philip Michael Woodward (151689).

Flying Officer

- Bryn William Lewis (1803949).

Lieutenant

- William Noble, DSC, Royal Navy.

==== Bar to Air Force Cross ====
Wing Commanders

- Frank Leslie Dodd, DSO, DFC, AFC (89766).
- Dennis George Lyster, DSO, DFC, AFC (43149).

Squadron Leader

- Dunham Hodgson Seaton, DFC, AFC (46705).

==== 2nd Bar to Air Force Cross ====
- Wing Commander Andrew Henry Humphrey, OBE, DFC, AFC* (33543).

=== Air Force Medal (AFM) ===
Flight Sergeants

- 1802031 Arthur Henry Hyland.
- 2257192 Frank William Leach.
- 1332879 George Henry Pope.
- 1624027 John Emmerson Sowerby.
- 1833880 Kenneth Walter Prowse Symonds.
- 1432641 Jack Westwell.

Acting Flight Sergeant

- 636119 Alfred Walter Card.

Sergeant

- 3043287 Ernest Whitaker.

=== Queen's Commendation for Valuable Service in the Air ===
Wing Commander

- John Hubert Lempriere Blount, DFC (33471).

Squadron Leaders

- Harry Bennett, AFC (169108).
- Ivor Gordon Broom, DSO, DFC (112392).
- David George Evans (164718).
- Hugh Ogilvie Forth (40688).
- Bernard Handley Howard, DFC (52715).
- Thomas Dixon Sanderson, AFC (131619).
- Francis Ercole Zaccheo (178326).

Flight Lieutenants

- Francis Gordon Agnew (164965).
- William Albert Bell (1620518).
- James Stirling Crawford (197655).
- Basil D'Oliveira (2238415).
- George Frederick Gill (150523).
- Cameron Fraser Green, AFC (59436).
- Alan John Harris (1585528).
- William Edward Hedley (162245).
- William Herbert Johnson (201632).
- Kenneth Geoffrey Jones (186124).
- Robert Thornton Jones (172453).
- John William Charles Judge (142533), Royal Auxiliary Air Force.
- Frank Richard Lockyer (607090).
- Ian Neil Maclaren (173514).
- Frederick Mandeville (57739).
- William Kerr Moncur (91303), Royal Auxiliary Air Force.
- Arthur Richard Munday (167176).
- Frank Alan Nicholls (163980).
- Richard Michael Oliver (64924), Royal Auxiliary Air Force.
- Francis Dunstan Reacroft (199968), Royal Auxiliary Air Force.
- Donald Hamilton Smith, DFC (501762), Royal Air Force Reserve of Officers.
- Frank Charles Sumner (195209).
- Eric Winterbottom, DFC (47559).

Flying Officers

- Peter Robert Ernest McLeland (3509640).
- Arnold Bert Thompson (4047115).

Flight Sergeants

- 1591208 Robert Derek Butcher.
- 745304 Ernest Wilfred Dunkling.
- 575609 James Robert John Hole.
- 705558 Stefan Jankowski.
- 1571507 John Ross Ritchie.

Sergeants

- 1629505 Denzil Courtney Haycock.
- 4041407 John Frederick Taylor.

United Kingdom

- Albert Frederick Henry Brown, Experimental Officer, Radar Research Establishment, Ministry of Supply.
- Captain John Walter William Cooke, Junior Captain, British European Airways Corporation.
- Captain Reginald William Lee Mulliner, DFC, Chief Pilot, Hunting-Clan Air Transport Ltd., Field Aircraft Services Ltd.
- Captain Richard Rudd, OBE, Aircraft Captain, British Overseas Airways Corporation.
- Captain Archibald Wilson, DFC, Senior Captain, Second Class, Viscount Flight, British European Airways Corporation.

Oversea Territories

- Phillip Elvy Henn, Pilot, East African Airways Corporation.
- Captain John Bernard Walter Pugh, OBE, AFC, Chief Pilot, Cyprus Airways.
- Patrick Anthony Travers, Pilot, East African Airways Corporation.

=== Queen's Police Medal ===
England and Wales

- Sydney Lawrence, OBE, Chief Constable, Kingston-upon-Hull City Police Force.
- Norman Walter Goodchild, OBE, Chief Constable, Wolverhampton Borough Police Force.
- Melbourne Thomas, Chief Constable, Merthyr Tydfil Borough Police Force.
- Harry Ambler, Assistant Chief Constable, Bradford City Police Force.
- Thomas Berkeley Wheeler, Superintendent and Deputy Chief Constable, Herefordshire Constabulary.
- John Arnold Clayton, Detective Superintendent, Leicestershire and Rutland Constabulary.
- William Arthur Ham, Superintendent (Grade I), Metropolitan Police.
- Reginald Hubert Osborne Owen, Superintendent (Grade I), Metropolitan Police.
- Horace Robert Norman, Superintendent (Grade I), Metropolitan Police.
- Alfred Stephen Bowkett, Superintendent, Monmouthshire Constabulary.
- Stanley Lawrence Simmonds, Superintendent, West Sussex Constabulary.
- Herbert Burton Goult, Superintendent, Leeds City Police Force.

Scotland

- John Smith Ramage Muir, Chief Constable, Ayr Burgh Police Force.
- William Wilson Wait, Superintendent, Berwick, Roxburgh and Selkirk Constabulary.

Northern Ireland

- William Robert Whitcroft, Head Constable, Royal Ulster Constabulary.

Southern Rhodesia

- Lieutenant-Colonel Graham Sydney Ablitt Rolfe, CPM, Assistant Commissioner, British South Africa Police.

Oversea Territories

- Arthur Lewin Alexander, Assistant Commissioner of Police, Gold Coast.
- Lieutenant Colonel Charles Howard Agabeg Sturge, OBE, Superintendent of Police, Federation of Malaya.
- Cecil Maurice John Kirke, Acting Senior Assistant Commissioner of Police, Federation of Malaya.
- Frederick Walter Underwood, Chief Inspector, HM Dockyard Police, Malta.
- John Ernest Hodge, Commissioner of Police, Federation of Nigeria.
- Bernard Harold Nealon, Senior Superintendent of Police, Sierra Leone.
- Douglas Keith Broadhurst, DSO, Deputy Commissioner of Police, Singapore.

=== Queen's Fire Service Medal ===
England and Wales

- Francis Mees, BEM, Chief Officer, East Sussex Fire Brigade.
- George Hamilton Cramp, MM, Divisional Officer, Middlesex Fire Brigade.
- Reginald John Smith, MBE, Assistant Chief Officer, Suffolk and Ipswich Fire Brigade.
- Ernest George Harmer, GM, Chief Officer, Blackpool Fire Brigade.
- Jesse William Hasted, Chief Officer, Lincolnshire (Holland) Fire Brigade.

Oversea Territory

- James Fendley Read, Superintendent, Kingston and St Andrew Fire Brigade, Jamaica.

=== Colonial Police Medal ===
Southern Rhodesia.

- Captain Frank Eric Barfoot, British South Africa Police.
- Cecil George Bennett, Staff Chief Inspector, British South Africa Police.
- Major Harry Branton Blowers, British South Africa Police.
- John Anthony Hardman Brereton, Chief Inspector, British South Africa Police.
- Chiwota, Station Sergeant, British South Africa Police.
- Major Leslie Blumenthal Goodall, British South Africa Police.
- Major George Mervyn Harries, British South Africa Police.
- Donald Vincent McGovern, Chief Inspector, British South Africa Police.
- Muleta, Detective Station Sergeant, British South Africa Police.
- Lieutenant-Colonel Graham Cecil Rogers, British South Africa Police.

Swaziland.

- Captain Duff Stanford Hellet, Swaziland Police Force.

Oversea Territories.

- Theophilus Adjabeng Adjirackor, Assistant Superintendent, Gold Coast Police Force.
- Ahmad bin Mohammed Noh, Acting Sergeant Major, Federation of Malaya Police Force.
- Ajie bin Basinau, Inspector, North Borneo Police Force.
- Julius Amadi, Sergeant Major, Nigeria Police Force.
- James Aw, Honorary Inspector, Auxiliary Police, Federation of Malaya.
- Major Gilbert Roy Williamson Bane, Commandant, Special Reserve Police, British Guiana.
- Peter Michael Becker, Senior Reserve Police Officer, Kenya Police Reserve.
- Edward Belsoi, Assistant Inspector, Kenya Police Force.
- Robert Wallace Calderwood, OBE, Assistant Commissioner, Singapore Police Force.
- Michael James Homersham Cartlidge, Senior Superintendent, Nigeria Police Force.
- Donald Cartwright, Superintendent, Kenya Police Force.
- John Frederick George Coles, Superintendent, Gold Coast Police Force.
- Peter Frederic Collyer, Assistant Superintendent, Federation of Malaya Police Force.
- Dambarbahadur Gurung, Sub-Inspector, Federation of Malaya Police Force.
- John Henry Davies, Deputy Superintendent, Singapore Police Force.
- Patrick Gronow Davis, Acting Senior Superintendent, Kenya Police Force.
- Dolmat bin Tambi Ahmad, Corporal, Federation of Malaya Special Constabulary.
- Noel Brian Dudgeon, Lieutenant, Federation of Malaya Police Force.
- Lovain Thomas Dunman, Assistant District Commandant, Kenya Police Reserve.
- Edwin Everett, Senior Superintendent, Nigeria Police Force.
- John Derek Fairhead, TD, Superintendent, Federation of Malaya Police Force.
- Sydney Roy Follows, Lieutenant, Federation of Malaya Police Force.
- William Ford, Senior Superintendent, Nigeria Police Force.
- Percy France, Inspector, British Guiana Police Force.
- Aubrey Noel Francombe, DSO, MBE, Deputy Provincial Commandant, Kenya Police Reserve.
- Gan Kok-Leong, Inspector, Federation of Malaya Police Force.
- David Brodie Goodsir, Deputy Superintendent, Federation of Malaya Police Force.
- Sidney Cecil Grimley, Deputy Superintendent, Uganda Police Force.
- Salifu Grumah, Sergeant Major, Gold Coast Police Force.
- Abdul Hamid bin Abu, Sergeant, Federation of Malaya Police Force.
- Abdul Hamid bin Sulong, Sub-Inspector, Singapore Police Force.
- Samuel Benjamin Hull, Station Sergeant, Leeward Islands Police Force.
- Ignatius Ikenwewi, Sergeant Major, Nigeria Police Force.
- George William Jackson, Acting Senior Assistant Commissioner, Singapore Police Force.
- Johari bin Abdul Shukor, Sub-Inspector, Federation of Malaya Police Force.
- Philip Nzuke Jacob Kaloki, Inspector, Kenya Police Force.
- Reginald Laity, Honorary Inspector, Auxiliary Police, Federation of Malaya.
- Lam Hon, Detective Staff Sergeant, Hong Kong Police Force.
- Alfred Gordon Langdon, Assistant Commissioner, Jamaica Constabulary.
- Lim Choon Seng, Sub-Inspector, Singapore Police Force.
- Ronald George Lock, Superintendent, Nigeria Police Force.
- William Alfred Luscombe, Deputy Superintendent, Federation of Malaya Police Force.
- David Robert Andrew McCorkell, MC, Acting Superintendent, Federation of Malaya Police Force.
- John Malcolm McNeil Maclean, Assistant Commissioner, Singapore Police Force.
- Erasmus Ranford Tawia Madjitey, Superintendent, Gold Coast Police Force.
- Stanley William Robert Marsden, Deputy Superintendent, Federation of Malaya Police Force.
- Maulud bin Idris, Corporal, Federation of Malaya Police Force.
- Geoffrey Dupuis Maydon, Superintendent, Gambia Police Force.
- Mahandrese Ginderese Martin Mendis, Sergeant, Federation of Malaya Police Force.
- George Arnold Miles, Honorary Inspector, Auxiliary Police, Federation of Malaya.
- Mohamed bin Hassan, Assistant Superintendent, Federation of Malaya Police Force.
- George William Mukasa, Detective Corporal, Uganda Police Force.
- William Neell, DSO, Deputy Superintendent, Federation of Malaya Police Force.
- Charles Arthur Alan Nicol, Acting Superintendent, Federation of Malaya Police Force.
- James Norris, Sergeant, Falkland Islands Police Force.
- Gideon Mumo Nzoika, Assistant Inspector, Kenya Police Force.
- Ngalu O'Brien, Sub-Inspector, Gilbert and Ellice Islands Armed Constabulary.
- Oguma son of Kirahi, Inspector, Tanganyika Police Force.
- Gilbert Okpara, Sergeant Major, Nigeria Police Force.
- Jeremiah Nwdfafor Maduguba Oli, Chief Inspector, Nigeria Police Force.
- Oloo son of Meso, Assistant Inspector, Kenya Police Force.
- Omar bin Awang, Sub-Inspector, Singapore Police Force.
- Michael Onigbo, Sergeant, Nigeria Police Force.
- James Myles Oswald, Superintendent, Kenya Police Force.
- Robert Lawrence Ako Otchere, Inspector, Gold Coast Police Force.
- Haji Pawanchee bin Mohamed Yusoff, Inspector, Federation of Malaya Police Force.
- Thomas Peters, Chief Inspector, Sierra Leone Police Force.
- Kesava Subramonya Pillai, Chief Inspector, Kenya Police Force.
- John Vincent Prendergast, Senior Superintendent, Kenya Police Force.
- Panes Prodromitis, Chief Inspector, Cyprus Police Force.
- Chinaya Naidoo Purseeramen, Sub-Inspector, Mauritius Police Force.
- Abdul Rahman bin Dalbasah, Acting Assistant Superintendent, Singapore Police Force.
- Appudhurai Thurai Rajah, Deputy Superintendent, Singapore Police Force.
- Frank Thomas Reader, Deputy Superintendent, Uganda Police Force.
- Matendechero Rinyulu, Assistant Inspector, Kenya Police Force.
- William Segrue, Acting Assistant Commissioner, Hong Kong Police Force.
- Shabani son of Msaweka, Detective Sergeant Major, Tanganyika Police Force.
- Richard Pelham Hart Shelmerdine, Acting Superintendent, Singapore Police Force.
- Stephen Lloyd Sherriff, Inspector, Leeward Islands Police Force.
- Jaimal Singh son of Roor Singh, Inspector, Federation of Malaya Police Force.
- William Jerry Spearman, Lieutenant, Federation of Malaya Police Force.
- Robert William Spooner, Senior Reserve Police Officer, Kenya Police Reserve.
- Herbert Ramsey Terrett, Assistant Superintendent, Hong Kong Police Force.
- Chephorriah Thom, Inspector, British Guiana Police Force.
- Tong Sam Poy, Honorary Assistant Superintendent, Federation of Malaya Police Volunteer Reserve.
- Vellasamy son of Narayanasamy, Sergeant, Special Constabulary, Federation of Malaya.
- Thomas Burrup Voice, Superintendent, Federation of Malaya Police Force.
- John Gidion Wales, Assistant Superintendent, Sierra Leone Police Force.
- Charles Reginald Warwick, Deputy Superintendent, Federation of Malaya Police Force.
- Wong Heckling, Inspector, Federation of Malaya Police Force.
- Wong Tuck Yoon, Inspector, Federation of Malaya Police Force.
- John Basil Wyatt, Acting Superintendent, Federation of Malaya Police Force.
- Ya'acob bin Abdul Manan, Sub-Inspector, Singapore Police Force.
- Yahya bin Abdul Hadi, Inspector, Federation of Malaya Special Constabulary.
- Yee Joon Toh, Senior Inspector, Singapore Police Force.
- Zainalabidin bin Andak, Sergeant, Federation of Malaya Special Constabulary.

== Australia ==
=== Knight Bachelor ===
- The Honourable Thomas Stuart Clyne, Judge of the Bankruptcy Court.
- Albert Ernest Coates, OBE, MD, MS. For services to the medical profession.
- Professor Harold Robert Dew, MB, BS. For services to Medicine.
- Eugene Aynsley Goossens. For services to Music.
- Edward Henry Bruce Lefroy. For services to the agricultural and pastoral industries.
- Edwin McCarthy, CBE, Deputy High Commissioner in London for the Commonwealth of Australia.
- John Proctor Tivey. For services to engineering, science and industry.

=== Order of the Bath ===
==== Companion of the Order of the Bath (CB) ====
Military Division

- Rear-Admiral Roy Russell Dowling, CBE, DSO.

=== Order of Saint Michael and Saint George ===
==== Companion of the Order of St Michael and St George (CMG) ====
- William Archer Gunn. For services to the pastoral industry.
- Benjamin Keith Rank, MB, MS, Chief Plastic Surgeon, Heidelberg Military Hospital, Victoria.
- Alan Robert Stanley Vickers, OBE, ChM, MB. For services to the Flying Doctor Service.

=== Order of the British Empire ===
==== Knight Commander of the Order of the British Empire (KBE) ====
Civil Division

- William Hudson, chairman, Snowy Mountains Hydro-Electric Authority.
- Major-General Jack Edwin Stawell Stevens, CB, DSO, ED, chairman, Australian Atomic Energy Commission.
- The Honourable Alan Russell Taylor, Justice of the High Court.

==== Dame Commander of the Order of the British Empire (DBE) ====
Civil Division

- Mabel Balcombe, Lady Brookes, CBE. For charitable and social welfare services.

==== Commander of the Order of the British Empire (CBE) ====
Military Division

- Captain Edward Hamilton Leitch, Royal Australian Navy.
- Major-General (temporary) Hector Geoffrey Edgar (3/24), Australian Staff Corps.
- Major-General Reginald George Pollard, DSO (2/14), Australian Staff Corps.

In recognition of services in Korea during the period 31 July 1954 to 31 January 1955.

- Brigadier Ian Thomas Murdoch, OBE, 3/66, Australian Staff Corps.

Civil Division

- Lewis Charles Burne, President, Victorian Employers' Federation. For public services.
- Rita Mary Buxton, OBE. For charitable services.
- Walter Russell Crocker, Her Majesty's Australian Ambassador to Indonesia.
- John Angus Lancaster Gunn. For services in the field of taxation.
- Thomas Joseph Hawkins, Secretary, Department of the Navy.
- William Caldwell McClelland, MB, ChB. For services to Sport.
- Charles Hector McFadyen, Secretary, Department of Shipping and Transport.
- Francis Joseph McKenna, OBE, Deputy Secretary, Prime Minister's Department.
- Frederick Grantley Morgan, MB, ChB, Director, Commonwealth Serum Laboratories.
- James Lockie Wilson. For services to the pastoral and agricultural industries.

==== Officer of the Order of the British Empire (OBE) ====
Military Division

- Instructor Commander Haydn Guest, Royal Australian Navy.
- Lieutenant-Colonel Humphrey George Bates (2/106), Australian Staff Corps.
- Lieutenant-Colonel (temporary) Roy George Lawrence (2/85), Australian Staff Corps.
- Lieutenant-Colonel Frederick Austin Mackell, MC (2/78997), Royal Australian Infantry Corps (now Reserve of Officers).
- The Reverend Raymond Charles Russell, Royal Australian Air Force.
- Wing Commander Edward Thomas Pickerd, DFC (033123), Royal Australian Air Force.

In recognition of services in Korea during the period 31 July 1954 to 31 January 1955.

- Lieutenant-Colonel Sydney Hamilton Buckler, 3/159, The Royal Australian Regiment.

Civil Division

- Isabella Julia Annand. For charitable work.
- Joseph William Brophy. For services to the Customs Department.
- Councillor John Macpherson Caldwell. For services to local government.
- John Qualtrough Ewens, Commonwealth Parliamentary Draftsman.
- William Douglass Forsyth, Australian Minister to the United Nations in New York.
- Robert Hartford Gilbert. For services to the dried fruits industry.
- Susan Agnes Jean Haines, RRC. For services to Nursing.
- Sydney Randal Heymanson. For services in connection with commercial relations with the United States of America and in promoting international commerce.
- Thomas Victor Maker. For public services.
- Jack Mitchell. For services to the Returned Soldiers' League of Australia, Queensland Branch.
- The Reverend William Perry French Morris, founder and first Headmaster, Church of England Grammar School, Brisbane. For public services.
- Charles Pearcy Mountford. For services to Anthropology.
- Percival Bartlett Nye, Director, Commonwealth Bureau of Mineral Resources.
- Norman Stanley Osborne. For services to the Returned Soldiers' League of Australia, Victoria Branch.
- Roy Rowling Pavia. For services to Education.
- Henry Presley Pride, formerly Honorary Treasurer, Royal Women's Hospital, Melbourne. For public services.
- Daphne Anne Roberts. For public and charitable work.
- Constance Robertson. For services to Journalism.
- Nea Josephine Rodway. For public and charitable services.
- Eric Fleming Smart. For pioneering services to Agriculture.
- Norman William Strange. For services to the Postmaster-General's Department.
- Edward Waldemar Timcke, Director of Meteorology, Commonwealth Department of the Interior.

==== Member of the Order of the British Empire (MBE) ====
Military Division

- Lieutenant Arthur Alfred Andrews, Royal Australian Navy.
- Lieutenant Edward Blatchford, Royal Australian Navy.
- 2/1723 Warrant Officer Class II Leslie Baich, Royal Australian Armoured Corps.
- Captain Merton Charles Gardner (2/490), Australian Staff Corps.
- 6/72 Warrant Officer Class II Elvin William Hale, Royal Australian Artillery.
- Major George Kerr (3/181), Australian Staff Corps.
- Captain (temporary) Leonard Montague Montgomerie, MC (4/400059), Royal Australian Infantry Corps.
- Major Arthur Roy Thorburn (1/21206), Royal Australian Infantry Corps.
- Major (temporary) Raymond Arthur Truman (4/21005), Royal Australian Infantry Corps.
- Captain Jack Sidney Whittle (2/75632), Royal Australian Infantry Corps.
- Squadron Leader Eric Clarence Mogensen (03475), Royal Australian Air Force.
- Warrant Officer Leonard Vivian Douglas Dolphin (A3845), Royal Australian Air Force.
- Warrant Officer Charles Grenville Smith (A3940), Royal Australian Air Force.

Civil Division

- Ellen Anders. For charitable and public work.
- Lionel Charles Balmanno. For services to the Commonwealth Lighthouse Steamer Service.
- Frank Malcolm Basden. For services to the Flying Doctor Service.
- John Hounslow Burchett. For services on behalf of deaf children.
- Gilbert Leslie Cameron, MM. For services in the interest of hospitals.
- Maude Martha Cameron, Headmistress, Firbank Church of England Grammar School for many years. For public services.
- James Bentley Corbin. For services to the community during the recent floods.
- Richard John Gainey. For services in the interests of Australian ex-servicemen and in other public fields.
- Frederick William Ross Godden. For services in connection with the economic development of Papua and New Guinea.
- Robert Arthur Vivian Grant. For services to Music, especially in connection with the playing of brass instruments.
- Ellen Margaret Hall. For social welfare services on behalf of Service personnel and their families.
- Mary Josephine Healion. For public services.
- The Reverend James William Thomas Henderson. For services to the community, especially during the recent floods.
- Harold Charles Hinckfuss, MM. For services to the Postmaster-General's Department.
- Kenneth Garth Jackson. For services to civil aviation.
- Eva Elizabeth Carlyle Jacobs. For philanthropic and charitable services.
- Nancy Jobson. For services to Education.
- Cecilia May Ossoli Kelly, author and artist.
- Aubrey Albert Koch. For services to civil aviation.
- Charles Victor Leyonjelm. For services to local government and agricultural development.
- Alfred John Mason. For services to Education.
- Ernest John McDonald. For services in the field of education.
- Allan McKenzie. For services rendered in connection with Immigration.
- The Reverend Samuel Whiteside McKibbin. For services rendered in the interests of aged persons.
- James Hugh David Millar. For voluntary services rendered in connection with the Red Cross, particularly the Ambulance Services.
- Ebenezer Minnis. For public services, especially in the interests of deaf, dumb and blind children.
- Albert Philip Harold Oke, Commonwealth Public Service Inspector, Adelaide.
- Reginald Francis Patterson. For services to the Commonwealth Supply Department.
- Ernest Arthur Pleydell. For services in connection with the administration of life saving organisations.
- Herbert Lorraine Port, Assistant Secretary, Department of Defence.
- Vincent William Quealy, Assistant Secretary, Department of Defence.
- Helen Ryan, founder and Commandant of the Women's National Emergency Legion.
- Harold Urquhart Shepherdson, a lay missionary in Northern Australia.
- Keith Allison Virtue. For services to civil aviation.
- Clive Harold Voss. For services in connection with the development of commercial relations between Australia and France.
- Ada Beatrice Webb. For charitable services.

=== Companion of the Imperial Service Order (ISO) ===
Australian Civil Service.

- Ernest Percy Eltham, Director, Industrial Training Division, Department of Labour and National Service.
- Joseph William Robert Hughes, Deputy Commissioner of Taxation, Sydney.

=== British Empire Medal (BEM) ===
Military Division

- Chief Engineering Mechanic John Whittaker Wall,35596, Royal Australian Navy.
- Petty Officer Raymond Campbell Foord, 28204, Royal Australian Navy.
- 2/1516 Staff-Sergeant Aubrey Rueben Wesby Cramp, Royal Australian Infantry Corps.
- 3/82484 Staff-Sergeant John William Duncan, Royal Australian Infantry Corps.
- 2/701 Corporal Nicholas Rundle, Royal Australian Army Ordnance Corps.
- 2/139443 Staff-Sergeant Bruce Maxwell Sawyer, Royal Australian Armoured Corps.
- 2/10600 Sergeant (temporary) Thomas Shacklady, Royal Australian Infantry Corps.
- 1/55569 Sergeant (temporary) Arturo Vipiana, Royal Australian Infantry Corps.
- 2/2660 Sergeant Francis Leonard Whitting, Royal Australian Army Service Corps.
- A.34506 Sergeant Henry Ernest Sayers, Royal Australian Air Force.

=== Royal Red Cross (RRC) ===
==== Associate of the Royal Red Cross (ARRC) ====
- Captain Joan Elms (Fl/2), Royal Australian Army Nursing Corps.
- Captain Cecilie Catherine Moulton (F3/4), Royal Australian Army Nursing Corps.
- Major (temporary) Beatrice Joan Paige (F2/269), Royal Australian Army Nursing Corps.
- Matron Norah Maker (N33302), Royal Australian Air Force Nursing Service.

=== Air Force Cross (AFC) ===
- Flight Lieutenant John Thomas Dollisson, DFC (013094), Royal Australian Air Force.

== Ceylon ==
=== Knight Bachelor ===
- The Honourable Cyril De Zoysa, President of the Senate.
- Ernest Peter Arnold Fernando, CBE. For public services.
- Sangarapillai Pararajasingam. For services to Agriculture.

=== Order of Saint Michael and Saint George ===
==== Knight Commander of the Order of St Michael and St George (KCMG) ====
- Sir Ukwatte Acharige Jayasundera, KBE, QC. For political and public services.
- The Honourable Sir Alan Edward Percival Rose, QC, Chief Justice.

==== Companion of the Order of St Michael and St George (CMG) ====
- Edmund Joseph Cooray, OBE, chairman, Co-operative Wholesale Establishment.

=== Order of the British Empire ===
==== Commander of the Order of the British Empire (CBE) ====
Civil Division

- Suriyakumara Nichinga Senathiraja Ambalavaner Naganather Thandigai Canaganayagam, OBE. For public services.
- Victor Manuel De Mel. For services to Commerce.
- Adeline, Lady Molamure, OBE, Deputy President of the Senate.

==== Officer of the Order of the British Empire (OBE) ====
Military Division

- Commander Adalbert Vance Frugtniet, VRD, Royal Ceylon Volunteer Naval Force.
- Lieutenant Colonel Rasanayagam Sabanayagam, MBE, ED, Ceylon Cadet Corps.

Civil Division

- The Reverend James Cartman, Education Officer, Office of the Ceylon High Commissioner in London.
- Hewananarachchige Ivan Tiddy Dasanaike, Member of Parliament for Wariyapola. For political services.
- Theodore Alexander Dunuwille, Crown Advocate, Kandy.
- Douglas St. Clive Budd Janszé, Acting Solicitor-General.
- Nanayakkara Atulugamage Stephen de Silva Jayasinghe, Member of Parliament for Wellawatte-Galkissa. For political services.
- Ramachandran Alaghoopillai Nadesan. For public services.
- Kanahala Bandaralage Lawrence Perera. For services to Transport.
- M. Srikantha, MBE, Government Agent, Northern Province.
- Abdul Rahaman Mohamed Thassim, MBE. For public services in Galle.

==== Member of the Order of the British Empire (MBE) ====
Military Division

- Captain Ceada Felix Fernando, Ceylon Artillery.
- Captain Weerawarnasuriya Patabendige Jinadasa Silva, Ceylon Army.

Civil Division

- Ethel De Kretser, Matron, Central Hospital.
- Walter Harris De Kretser. For services to Commerce.
- Talpe Gamage Bernard De Silva, Government Printer.
- Debramandadige Jason Fernando, managing director, Jason Fernando & Sons Ltd.
- Oliver Phoenix Charles Baden-Powell Forbes, Deputy Controller of Establishments, General Treasury.
- Jack McLennan Godefroy, Assistant Manager, Firestone (Ceylon) Ltd, Colombo.
- Maganlal Kuberdas Kapadia. For services to Commerce.
- Joachim Rosario Machado. For services to Commerce.
- Carthigasu Nadesan, Chief (Guarantee) Shroff, Indian Overseas Bank Ltd., Colombo.
- Sundaram Pathmanathan, Shroff, Imperial Bank of India Ltd., Colombo.
- Titus Walter Perera. For political services.
- Muthiahpillai Rajendram. For services to Commerce.
- Donald Jasen Ranaweera. For public services.
- David Robert Waller, Manager, Building & Construction Department, Walker Sons & Company Ltd., Colombo.
- Don Fredrick Wijenarayana. For public services in Galle.

=== Companion of the Imperial Service Order (ISO) ===
- Edgar Alexander Van der Straaten, Shipping Master, Customs Department.

=== British Empire Medal (BEM) ===
Civil Division

- Malcolm Hugh Jayasekera, Sub-Inspector, Ceylon Police Force.
- Daniel Sepala Seneviratne Jayatilake, Officer-in-Charge, Police Central Garage.
- Vidane Aratchilage Peter Linus Jayawardena, Stenographer, Higher Grade, Department of the Prime Minister.
- Edmund Henry Vernon Joseph, Chief Clerk, Cabinet Office.

== Pakistan ==
=== Order of the British Empire ===
==== Knight Commander of the Order of the British Empire (KBE) ====
Civil Division

- Sir William Ivor Jennings, QC, Constitutional Adviser to the Government.

==== Commander of the Order of the British Empire (CBE) ====
Military Division

- Brigadier (temporary) Alan Jolly, DSO, OBE, late Royal Tank Regiment.

Civil Division

- Hugh Godfrey Stuart Bivar, Secretary, Judicial and Legislative Department, and Remembrancer of Legal Affairs, Government of East Bengal.
- James Douglas Hardy, OBE, Joint Secretary, Ministry of Communications.

==== Officer of the Order of the British Empire (OBE) ====
Military Division

- Acting Captain Romuald Nalecz-Tyminski, DSC, Royal Pakistan Navy.
- Acting Commander George Denys Gregory, DSC, Royal Navy.
- Commander Neville Townley McHarg, DSO, Royal Navy.
- Lieutenant-Colonel (temporary) Harold Lewis Edwards, Royal Army Education Corps.
- Acting Wing Commander Ronald Bradshaw (74593), Royal Air Force.

Civil Division

- John Roland Chitham, Assistant Inspector-General of Police, East Bengal.
- Norman Francis Edmunds, Administrator-General and Official Trustee, Punjab.
- Alfred Sills, General Manager, Khairpur Textile Mills.
- Donald Vernon Sladen, MBE, Director, Armament Supply, Royal Pakistan Navy.

==== Member of the Order of the British Empire (MBE) ====
Military Division

- Major Anne Flanagan, ARRC, Queen Alexandra's Royal Army Nursing Corps.
- Warrant Officer Class I John Ray, Coldstream Guards.
- Squadron Leader Reuben George Thomas Williams (54590), Royal Air Force.
- Squadron Leader William Francis George Withers (47949), Royal Air Force.
- Acting Squadron Leader Cyril Tribe (58702), Royal Air Force.
- Warrant Officer Robert Henry Watts (562351), Royal Air Force.

Civil Division

- Abel Leslie Beech, Superintendent, Non Ferrous Factory, Pakistan Ordnance Factories, Wah.
- Norah Bedford Findley, Nursing Superintendent, Lady Aitchison Hospital, Lahore.
- Lionel Philip Healy, Manager, Steel and General Mills, North Western Railway.
- Eric Frank Smith, Civil Radar Officer, General Headquarters.

=== British Empire Medal (BEM) ===
Military Division

- 540199 Sergeant Norman Brian Johnstone Pellew, Royal Air Force.
