= List of people from Merseyside =

This is a list of notable people from what is now the county of Merseyside, including those from the city of Liverpool and surrounding areas.

== A ==
- Jacqui Abbott: singer with the Beautiful South
- Gary Ablett (1965–2012): footballer, FA Cup winner with both Liverpool F.C. and Everton F.C.
- Cyril Abraham: creator and writer of The Onedin Line
- Jake Abraham: actor
- Derek Acorah: radio psychic and author
- Alan A'Court: footballer represented England national football team in the 1958 FIFA World Cup
- John Aldridge: footballer, Liverpool F.C. and Republic of Ireland international
- Ernest Alexander: Victoria Cross recipient
- Jean Alexander: actress, played Hilda Ogden on the long-running soap opera Coronation Street and Auntie Wainwright in Last of the Summer Wine
- Trent Alexander-Arnold: footballer, Liverpool F.C., Real Madrid CF and England international
- Peter Allen: (1943–1964): who along with his accomplice Gwynn Owen Evens became the last person legally executed in the United Kingdom
- Nicky Allt: playwright
- Marc Almond: singer-songwriter
- Jeannette Altwegg: figure skater, 1952 Winter Olympics gold medallist, brought up in Liverpool from the age of two
- Chris Amoo: singer-songwriter, the Real Thing, the most successful black rock/soul act in England during the 1970s
- Charles Anderson: Victoria Cross recipient
- Freya Anderson: swimmer, gold medallist in the 2020 Summer Olympics
- Rupert Anderson: footballer, Merseyside's first England international
- Martyn Andrews: TV presenter, journalist, singer and actor
- Michael Angelis: actor, played TV roles such as Lucien Boswell in The Liver Birds, Chrissie Todd in Boys from the Black Stuff and as narrator of Thomas & Friends
- Paul Angelis: actor, most famous for playing Ringo in the Beatles' Yellow Submarine and Karageorge in the James Bond film For Your Eyes Only
- Richard Ansdell (1815–1885): artist
- John Archer (1863–1932): first black mayor in London (Battersea)
- Jimmy Ashcroft: footballer, England international
- April Ashley (1935–2021): transsexual rights campaigner
- Rick Astley (born 1966): pop singer
- Arthur Askey (1900–1982): comedian
- Sir John Aspinall (1851–1937): engineer in the design of locomotives
- Neil Aspinall (1941–2008): music executive of Apple Corps and managing director of Apple Records
- Ian Astbury (born 1962): musician, singer-songwriter in the rock band the Cult, lead singer in the American rock band the Doors of the 21st Century
- James Atherton (1770–1838): Liverpool merchant, promoter of Everton's urban development, founder of New Brighton
- Peter Atherton (1741–1799): engineer, inventor, and cotton machinery manufacturer
- Blanche Atkinson (1847–1911): novelist and author of children's books
- Graham Atkinson (1943–2017): footballer, brother of Ron Atkinson
- R. Frank Atkinson (1869–1923): architect
- Ron Atkinson (born 1939): footballer, manager of Manchester United F.C., Atlético Madrid and Aston Villa F.C.
- Frederick Attock (1846–1902): the first president and founder of Newton Heath L&YR F.C. that later became Manchester United F.C.

== B ==
- Lilian Bader (1918–2015): one of the first black women to join the British Armed Forces
- John Bailey (born 1957): footballer, Everton F.C.
- Dame Beryl Bainbridge (1932–2010): writer, nominated several times for the Booker Prize
- James Baines (1822–1889): ship-owner founder of James Baines & Co. that operated some of the most famous clipper ships at the time
- Leighton Baines (born 1984): footballer, Everton F.C. England international
- Anna, Lady Barlow (1873–1965): suffragette
- Frederick Barrett (1883–1931): RMS Titanic survivor
- Tony Barrow (1936–2016): music manager of the Kinks, the Bee Gees, Bay City Rollers, and others
- Charles Alfred Bartlett (1868–1945): captain of White Star Line ship HMHS Britannic, the largest ship lost in World War I and the worlds largest sunken passenger ship
- James Barton: founder of Cream and Creamfields, president of electronic dance music at Live Nation Entertainment
- Joe Baker (1940–2003): footballer, England international
- Tom Baker (born 1934): actor, had lead role in Doctor Who in the 1970s and 1980s
- David Balfe: musician and record company executive, produced Britpop band Blur on is label Food Records
- John Ball: golfer, the Open Championship winner, inducted into the World Golf Hall of Fame, a blue plaque at Royal Liverpool Golf Club
- Matthew Ball: principal dancer with the Royal Ballet
- Michael Ball: footballer, Rangers F.C., PSV Eindhoven and England international
- Nick Ball: boxer, former WBA featherweight champion
- Shirley Ballas: ballroom dancer and TV personality
- Billy Balmer: footballer, England international, brother of Everton F.C. footballer Bob Balmer
- Jack Balmer: footballer Liverpool F.C.
- Mary Bamber (1874–1938): suffragist
- Leslie Banks (1890–1952): actor
- Harmood Banner (1782–1865): founder of Liverpool Society of Chartered Accountants and the Institute of Chartered Accountants in England and Wales
- Paul Barber: actor who played Denzil Tulser in Only Fools and Horses
- Clive Barker: author, director and visual artist
- Ross Barkley: footballer, England international
- Anthony Barry: footballer, assistant manager of the England national football team
- Joey Barton: footballer
- Hogan Bassey: boxer, the first man of Nigerian descent to become a boxing champion, winning the WBA featherweight title
- Sir Percy Bates (1879–1946): chairman of Cunard-White Star Line who oversaw the launch of the RMS Queen Mary and RMS Queen Elizabeth - also oversaw the RMS Laconia the first continuous circumnavigation of the world by passenger liner later dubbed the first world cruise (the sinking of the RMS Laconia gave rise to the Laconia incident during the Battle of the Atlantic)
- Margaret Beavan: politician
- Peter Beckett: musician, singer-songwriter who had a number-one hit in the US with "Baby Come Back"
- Richard Beddows: recipient of the Medal of Honor in the American Civil War
- Sir Thomas Beecham (1879–1961): conductor and impresario
- Tom Bell: actor in Prime Suspect, The Krays and Wish You Were Here
- Tony Bellew: boxer, former WBC cruiserweight champion
- John Bellingham (1769–1812): Liverpool merchant and resident, who assassinated Spencer Perceval the only British prime minister to be assassinated he was immediately restrained and identified by Isaac Gascoyne MP for Liverpool
- Mitch Benn: comedian and songwriter, known for his work on BBC Radio 2 and 4
- James Theodore Bent: explorer archaeologist, and author
- Arthur Berry: footballer, England international won gold medal in the 1908 and 1912 summer Olympics
- Henry Berry (1719–1812): engineer of the Sankey Canal, Britain's first canal of the Industrial Revolution
- John Best: footballer
- Leanne Best: actress
- Pete Best: early member of the Beatles
- John Bibby (1775–1840): founder of the Bibby Line, the oldest independently owned shipping and maritime operations company
- Wayne Bickerton (1941–2015): music executive, record producer, songwriter and former chairman of SESAC
- John Bigham, 1st Viscount Mersey: jurist and politician, known for heading the British inquiry into the sinking of the RMS Titanic the RMS Lusitania and the RMS Empress of Ireland
- Jonathan Binns (1747–1818): English Quaker and abolitionist who was one of only two signatories from Liverpool who signed a 1783 parliamentary petition calling for the abolition of slavery
- Dyan Birch: singer, who had chart success with pop group Arrival and soul group Kokomo
- Pamela Birch: singer-songwriter, member of the Liverbirds, one of the first all-female bands
- John Birt: former director general of the BBC, member of the House of Lords
- John Bishop: comedian, presenter and actor
- Sir James Bisset: second officer of the Cunard Line ship RMS Carpathia that rescued 705 Titanic survivors, captain of both RMS Queen Mary and RMS Queen Elizabeth that delivered 447,777 troops to various theatres of conflict during WWII
- Cilla Black (1943–2015): singer, TV presenter
- Grey Blake: film actor
- Alan Bleasdale: radio, stage and screen writer
- Gary Bleasdale: actor and playwright
- Chris Boardman: cyclist, gold medallist at the 1992 Olympics and founder of Boardman Bikes
- Stan Boardman: comedian
- Phil Boersma: footballer
- Jean Boht: actress
- Sir Alfred Booth: shipping magnate, founder of Alfred Booth and Company, father of TV producer Sir Philip Booth, 2nd Baronet and grandfather of Douglas Allen Booth
- Angela Elizabeth Booth: eugenicist and politician
- Charles Booth: pioneer in social research, a blue plaque marks his former home at Grenville Place
- Henry Booth (1788–1869): inventor, founder and treasurer of the first steam railway conducting both scheduled passenger service and freight (Broad Green railway station, opened in 1830 is the oldest operating station and Lime Street railway station is the first Grand Terminus Mainline train station in the world
- Lewis Booth: executive vice-president at the Ford Motor Company, director of Rolls-Royce
- Tony Booth (1931–2017): actor and father of Cherie Booth, played Mike Rawlins in the sitcom Till Death Us Do Part
- Charles-Louis Napoleon Bonaparte (1808–1873): founded the Second French Empire in (1852–1870) as Emperor Napoleon III, lived in Southport in 1846
- Lord Ian Botham: cricketer
- Stanley Boughey: Victoria Cross recipient
- Sir Adrian Boult (1889–1983): conductor, brought up in a family connected to the Liverpool shipping and oil trade
- Roy Boulter: drummer in the Farm and co-founder of Hurricane Films
- Braaq (1971–1997): painter
- Eddie Braben: comedy writer and performer
- Charles Brabin (1882–1957): film director
- Paul Bracewell: footballer, Everton F.C. England international
- Kyran Bracken: rugby union player, member of England 2003 Rugby World Cup winning team, brought up in Liverpool
- Bessie Braddock: Labour politician, represented Liverpool electorate of Exchange for 24 years
- Doug Bradley: actor, best known as Pinhead from his best friend Clive Barker's Hellraiser films
- H. Chalton Bradshaw: architect
- Harry Bradshaw: footballer, Liverpool F.C. first ever England international
- Marcel Braithwaite: boxer, former British and Commonwealth champion
- Henry Arthur Bright (1830–1884): owner of Isambard Kingdom Brunel's iron ship SS Great Britain, which made its maiden voyage across the Atlantic in July 1845 starting from Liverpool
- Stan Brittain: cyclist, Olympic silver medallist
- Bernard Beryl Brodie (1907–1989): considered by many to be the founder of modern pharmacology
- John Alexander Brodie (1858–1934): engineer of the Queensway Tunnel, then the longest underwater road tunnel, also invented goal nets for football matches
- Maurice Brodie (1903–1939): virologist who developed a polio vaccine in 1935, brother of Bernard Beryl Brodie
- Tom Bromilow: footballer, Liverpool F.C. and England international
- Jack Brooks: songwriter of "That's Amore" a hit single for Dean Martin in 1953
- Robbie Brookside: wrestler
- John Brophy: author of over 40 books; some adapted to film
- Ian Broudie: singer-songwriter with the Lightning Seeds
- Faith Brown: comedian, singer, and actress
- Tom Brown: Major League Baseball player
- Sir William Brown (1784–1864): banker, founder of Brown Shipley, partner in family firm Alex. Brown & Sons the first investment bank in the United States
- Tyias Browning: footballer, Shanghai Port F.C. and China international
- David Brownlow, Baron Brownlow of Shurlock Row: member of the House of Lords
- Henry Brunner (1838–1916): chemist and businessman, director of Brunner Mond
- Sir John Brunner, 1st Baronet (1842–1919): industrialist and politician, co-founded Brunner Mond and Imperial Chemical Industries
- Neil Buchanan: TV presenter/producer best known for presenting Art Attack
- William Buddicom (1816–1887): pioneer railway engineer
- Irvine Bulloch (1842–1898): Confederate States Navy officer on the CSS Alabama, the most successful commerce raiding ship in maritime history
- James Dunwoody Bulloch: Confederate foreign agent based in Liverpool during the American Civil War, uncle of US President Theodore Roosevelt
- David Burke: actor, played Watson in early episodes of Granada's Sherlock Holmes
- Andy Burnham (born 1970): prime minister of the United Kingdom
- Pete Burns (1959–2016): singer-songwriter, founder of Dead or Alive
- Tommy Burns (1868―1897): diver, who achieved fame in the 1800s by diving off structures
- Malandra Burrows: actress born in Woolton, played Kathy Glover in Emmerdale
- Frank Bustard: shipping pioneer, founder of the Atlantic Steam Navigation Company, pioneered the first roll-on/roll-off ferry service
- Josephine Butler (1828–1906): social reformer of women's rights, women's suffrage leader Millicent Fawcett hailed her as "the most distinguished Englishwoman of the nineteenth century", lived in Liverpool 1866–1882
- Angela Buxton: tennis player
- Gerry Byrne: footballer, Liverpool F.C., and England's winning 1966 FIFA World Cup squad

== C ==
- Melanie C: singer-songwriter, (also known as Sporty Spice) from the Spice Girls, brought up in Rainhill before moving to Widnes
- Andrew Cain: boxer, former British and Commonwealth champion
- Ian Callaghan: footballer, Liverpool F.C. most appearances record holder and one of only three Englishman to win the 1966 FIFA World Cup and the European Cup
- Bobby Campbell: footballer
- Jane Maud Campbell (1869–1947): librarian and early advocate for multiculturalism
- Ramsey Campbell: novelist
- George Q. Cannon: first counselor, the Church of Jesus Christ of Latter-day Saints, and congressman for the State of Utah
- Larry Carberry: footballer
- Mary Birkett Card (1774–1817): abolitionist and feminist poet
- W. D. Caröe: architect
- Jamie Carragher: footballer, Liverpool F.C. and England international and Sky Sports football commentator
- Nathan Carter: Anglo-Irish country singer
- Jesse Carver (1911–2003): footballer, manager of Juventus FC winning the Serie A breaking the dominance of Turin city rivals Torino FC after the 1949 Superga air disaster
- Jimmy Case: footballer, Liverpool F.C. won three European cups
- Howie Casey: musician
- Kim Cattrall: actress, played Samantha Jones in Sex and the City
- Jimmy Cauty: musician, artist and record producer, co-founder of electronic band the KLF with Bill Drummond
- Sir James Chadwick (1891–1974): won the Nobel Prize for physics for discovery of the neutron
- Richard Chaffers (1731–1765): manufacturer of Liverpool porcelain
- Craig Charles: actor, TV presenter
- Niamh Charles: footballer, Women's Super League player
- Peter Charles: equestrian, show jumping British team winning gold medallist at the 2012 Olympic games
- Noel Godfrey Chavasse: the only person awarded the Victoria Cross twice in WWI
- Keith "Cheggers" Chegwin: TV presenter, brother of Janice Long
- Walter Citrine (1887–1983): leading twentieth-century trade unionist who was in The Black Book
- Abbey Clancy (born 1986): lingerie and catwalk model and TV presenter, married to footballer Peter Crouch
- Emma Clarke (1876–1905): considered to be the first known black woman footballer in Britain
- Margi Clarke (born 1954): actress
- John Clayton (1848–1924): rugby union, Liverpool F.C., founded in 1857, the oldest open rugby club
- Stephen Clemence (born 1978): footballer, the son of England international Ray Clemence
- Fred E. Cliffe (1885–1957): songwriter
- Anne Clough (1820–1892): suffragette
- Connor Coady (born 1993): footballer, England international
- George A. Cobham Jr. (1825–1864): brevet brigadier general in the American Civil War
- Ross Cohen: film director and producer, based in Los Angeles, California
- Tony Coleman (born 1945): footballer
- Sir Mark Collet, 1st Baronet (1816–1905): banker
- Frank Collins: who had chart success with pop group Arrival and Soul group Kokomo
- Lewis Collins: actor
- Jodie Comer: actress, played Villanelle in Killing Eve
- Tommy Comerford: Liverpool Mafia boss
- John Connelly: footballer, member of England 1966 FIFA World Cup winning team
- William Connolly: Victoria Cross recipient
- John Conteh: boxer, former WBC light heavyweight champion
- John Horton Conway: mathematician active in combinatorial game theory
- Brian Cooke: comedy writer known for creating sitcoms Father, Dear Father, Man About the House, George and Mildred, Robin's Nest and Keep it in the Family
- Johnny Cooke: boxer, former British and Commonwealth welterweight champion
- Martin Cooper: musician and artist
- Kenneth Cope: actor
- Steve Coppell: footballer, England international
- Richard Corbett: Labour MEP and leader of the UK Labour Party in the European Parliament
- Elvis Costello: singer-songwriter and record producer, inducted into the Rock and Roll Hall of Fame
- Harry Cotterell: trader, chairman of African Association, Ltd.
- Frank Cottrell-Boyce: screenwriter, novelist, actor
- Gabriel Coury: Victoria Cross recipient
- Sir Henry Coward (1849–1944): pioneer choral master conductor
- Alex Cox: film director
- Jack Cox: footballer, Liverpool F.C. and England international
- Michael Cox: singer and actor best known for his 1960 top-ten hit Angela Jones
- Sir Anthony Douglas Cragg: sculptor, winner of the Turner Prize
- Daniel Craig: film actor, most famous for playing James Bond, brought up in Merseyside town Hoylake and Liverpool
- Tony Crane: musician, co-founder of the Merseybeats
- Walter Crane (1845–1915): illustrator
- Peter Craven: motorcycle racer, two-time winner on the Speedway World Championship
- Aaron Cresswell: footballer, England international
- Julian Creus: weightlifter, Olympic medallist
- Charles Crichton: film director
- John Cropper (1797–1874): shipping magnate, attended the World Anti-Slavery Convention in 1840
- Will Cuff: football manager, league and FA cup winning manager of Everton F.C. and holds the record for the most wins in a Merseyside derby
- Peter Culshaw: boxer, former WBU and Commonwealth flyweight champion
- Steve Cummings: racing cyclist, Olympic medallist
- Edwina Currie: member of Parliament, government minister and author
- Chris Curtis: drummer and singer, known for being in Merseybeat band the Searchers, originated the concept behind rock band Deep Purple
- Dick Cuthell: musician and record producer, best known for his work with the Specials, recording engineer for Bob Marley and the Wailers, played horns on Marley and the Wailers' Exodus

== D ==
- Bill Davies (1892–1967): golfer, member of the 1933 Ryder Cup team
- George Davies (born 1941): fashion designer
- Brandon Daord (born 1997): boxer, British super flyweight champion
- Dame Jean Davies (1909–1996): director of the Women's Royal Naval Service and the fight against German U-boat U-534 in the Battle of the Atlantic - this victory paved the way for over 1.2 million United States soldiers pass through Liverpool during World War II - this figure represents a significant portion of the approximate 4.7 million troops who used the port to prepare for the invasion of Europe
- Robbie Davies Jr.: boxer, former British, Commonwealth, and European champion
- Saul Davies: musician, best known as a member of the rock band James
- Terence Davies (1945–2023): film director
- Paul Dawber: actor, Neighbours, Sons & Daughters, The Novelist
- Matt Dawson: rugby union player, member of England's winning 2003 Rugby World Cup team
- Dixie Dean: footballer, Everton F.C., scored second most goals in English league play
- Carol Decker: singer-songwriter, lead vocalist with T'Pau
- Les Dennis: comedian, TV quiz show host (Family Fortunes) and actor
- Jazza Dickens: boxer, WBA (interim) super featherweight champion
- Michael Dixon: cricket umpire
- Lottie Dod: tennis player, five-time winner of Wimbledon Ladies Championship
- Sir Ken Dodd (1927–2018): comedian, singer and actor
- Tony Dodson: boxer, former British super middleweight champion
- Cyril Done: footballer, Liverpool F.C.
- Arthur Dooley: artist and sculptor
- Brian Dooley: writer of The Smoking Room
- Terry Doran (1939–2020): music executive, manager of Grapefruit, Mary Hopkin, Apple Records, oversaw the launch of James Taylor's career and well as notable artists Billy Preston, Badfinger, Doris Troy, Ronnie Spector and Jackie Lomax
- James Francis Doyle: architect
- Ryan Doyle: two-time freerunning champion
- John Fraser Drummond: WWII flying ace
- Victoria Drummond (1894–1978): first female marine engineer for the Blue Funnel Line and its associated company Ocean Group plc
- Toni Duggan: footballer
- Geoff Duke: multiple Isle of Man TT winner and Motor Grand Prix road racing champion
- Aynsley Dunbar: musician, drummer, inducted into the Rock and Roll Hall of Fame as a member of American rock band Journey
- William Henry Duncan (1805–1863): Britain's first chief medical officer
- Paul Du Noyer: music journalist and author of Liverpool: Wondrous Place
- Hilary Dwyer: actor and film producer
- Martin Dwyer: Epsom Derby winning flat racing jockey, competed at Aintree Racecourse and Haydock Park Racecourse
- Franklin Dyall: actor and film director, Atlantic (1929 film)

== E ==
- William Earle (1833–1885): British Army officer
- Bill Eckersley: footballer, represented the England national football team in the 1950 FIFA World Cup
- Taron Egerton: actor
- Lawrence Anderson Ellerbeck (1874–1963): photographer
- Gordon Ellis (1920–1978): maritime artist
- Peter Ellis (1805–1884): British architect, inventor of the paternoster lift and pioneer of early skyscrapers
- Jennifer Ellison: actress
- Fred Emney: comic actor
- Brian Epstein (1934–1967): member of the Rock and Roll Hall of Fame in 2014 as manager of the Beatles
- Terry Etim: former UFC fighter
- Arthur Evans: Victoria Cross recipient
- Sir Charles Evans (1918–1995): mountaineer
- Mal Evans (1935–1976): road manager for the Beatles, producer for rock band Badfinger
- Roy Evans: footballer, manager of Liverpool F.C.
- Shaun Evans: actor, played Morse in the ITV series, Endeavour
- Tom Evans (1947–1983): musician, singer and songwriter, member of Badfinger
- Kenny Everett (1944–1995): radio and TV broadcaster and comic entertainer
- William Ewart (1798–1869): pioneer of the idea of blue plaques

== F ==
- Joe Fagan (1921–2001): footballer, assistant coach for twenty-seven years under Bill Shankly and Bob Paisley, first manager to win three major competitions in one season including the 1984 European Cup final
- Joe Fagin: singer and songwriter
- David Fairclough (born 1957): footballer, Liverpool F.C., one of the six Liverpool-born players to win the 1977 European Cup Final and 1978 European Cup Final
- Emily Fairn (born 1998): actor
- William Fawcett (1763–1844): engineer who commissioned the William Fawcett paddle steamer, the first ship operated by P&O shipping line, and the SS Royal William, the first primarily steam-powered crossing of the Atlantic
- John Fay (born 1964): TV scriptwriter and playwright
- Leslie Fenton (1902–1978): actor and film director
- Rebecca Ferguson (born 1986): singer-songwriter
- Sebastian Ziani de Ferranti (1864–1930): inventor and founder of Ferranti which built and produced the Ferranti Mark 1, the first commercially available general purpose electronic computer and the 1956 Ferranti Pegasus which is the second oldest surviving computer, the electrical engineering pioneer built the first modern power station in the world at Deptford Power Station
- Rocky Fielding (born 1987): boxer, former WBA (regular) super middleweight champion
- Luke Fildes (1843–1927): painter, a blue plaque marks his former home, Woodland House
- Neil Fitzmaurice: actor
- Frederick Fleet (1887–1965): British sailor, Titanic crewman and survivor who sighted the iceberg
- Snowy Fleet: drummer inducted into the ARIA Hall of Fame as a member of the Easybeats
- Tommy Fleetwood: golfer
- Robert Flemyng: actor
- George Forrester: marine engineer for ships including the SS Liverpool and the steam frigate Nemesis, the first British ocean-going iron warship
- Helen Forrester: author, wrote about her childhood from privileged child to slum kid in Liverpool in the 1930s (including Tuppence to Cross the Mersey)
- Sir William Bower Forwood: lord mayor of Liverpool, director of the Cunard Line and the Bank of Liverpool
- John Foster: surveyor to the Corporation of Liverpool and designer of notable buildings in the city
- Bill Foulkes (1932–2013): footballer, one of only two players to survive the Munich air disaster and went on to win the 1968 European Cup final
- Robbie Fowler: footballer, Liverpool F.C. and England international
- Ellis Abraham Franklin (1822–1909): banker
- Frederic Franklin: dancer
- Ian Edward Fraser (1920–2008): Victoria Cross recipient, scuba diving pioneer and attendee of HMS Conway and HMS Eaglet
- Jenny Frost: singer, member of Atomic Kitten
- Christian Furr: painter
- Billy Fury (1940–1983): pop singer-songwriter

== G ==
- Kate Gardiner (1885–1974): mountaineer who made many first ascents
- Gerald Gardner (1884–1964): founder of modern Wicca
- Tommy Gardner: footballer, England international
- James Garner: footballer
- Len Garry: musician, member of the Quarrymen.
- Howard Gayle: footballer, first black footballer to play for Liverpool F.C., Newcastle United F.C. and Blackburn Rovers F.C.
- Tom Georgeson: actor
- Steven Gerrard: footballer, captain of Liverpool F.C. and of the England national football team (114 caps)
- Spyridon Gianniotis: swimmer, Olympic silver medallist and two-time champion
- John Gibson (1790–1866): sculptor
- John Gidman: footballer
- William Ewart Gladstone (1809–1898): four-time prime minister of the United Kingdom (the most of any British prime minister)
- Sir Richard Glazebrook (1854–1935): physicist
- Clive Beverley Glynn: WWI flying ace
- William Godfrey (1889–1963): leader of England's Roman Catholics
- Lord Peter Goldsmith: British attorney general
- Leon Goossens: musician
- Sidonie Goossens: musician
- Amelia Elizabeth Roe Gordon: president of the Dominion Woman's Christian Temperance Union of Canada
- Anthony Gordon: footballer, FC Barcelona and England international
- Sylvia Gore: footballer, scored the first goal for the England women's national football team in its first official match
- John Gorman: comedian, musician
- Leslie Gossage: Royal Air Force commander-in-chief during WWII, generally credited with playing a crucial role in defending Britain against aerial attack - in terms of loss of life and damage the Liverpool Blitz was second only to that of London, 4000 lost their lives in Merseyside
- Cyril Edward Gourley: Victoria Cross recipient
- James Graham (born 1985): most capped player for the England national rugby league team, captain of the Great Britain national rugby league team
- Leslie Graham (1911–1953): motorcycle road racer, 1953 Isle of Man TT winner
- Nina Cameron Graham (1891–1974): engineer
- Stephen Graham (born 1973): film actor, Greyhound
- Stuart Graham (born 1942): Grand Prix motorcycle racer
- Henry Grayson (1865–1951): shipbuilder for H. & C. Grayson Ltd, building Royal Navy ships during WWII including HMS Fidelity, later MP
- Christopher Greener (1943–2015): actor, formerly Britain's tallest man
- Alex Greenwood (born 1993): footballer, woman's England international
- Debbie Greenwood (born 1959): TV presenter, former beauty queen
- Roly Gregoire: footballer, the first black footballer to play for Sunderland A.F.C.
- John Gregson: TV and film actor
- Tony & Chris Griffiths: singer-songwriters of the indie/rock band the Real People, co-wrote for Oasis
- Chelcee Grimes: singer-songwriter, footballer
- Augustus Radcliffe Grote (1841–1903): entomologist
- John Gustafson: singer-songwriter, was originally included into the Rock and Roll Hall of Fame among the list of inducted member for Roxy Music however, his name was dropped from the list
- Deryck Guyler (1914–1999): comedy actor

== H ==
- Tony Hall, Baron Hall of Birkenhead: former director general of the BBC, member of the House of Lords
- William Halsall (1841–1919): marine painter
- Antony Hamilton (1952–1995): film actor
- Natasha Hamilton: singer, member of Atomic Kitten
- Russ Hamilton: singer-songwriter with hits in both UK and US - his song "Rainbow" reached number 10 in US in 1957
- Harry Hanan: cartoonist of the syndicated comic strip Louie
- Tommy Handley (1892–1949): comedian
- Gerald Hanley: novelist and brother of James Hanley
- James Hanley: novelist and playwright
- David Hanson: politician
- E. Chambré Hardman: Irish-born photographer, took the well known photograph, Birth of the Ark Royal
- John Hardman: businessman, former chairman of Asda
- John Hargreaves: businessman, founder of Matalan
- Alan Harper: footballer, Everton F.C.
- Gus Harris (1908–2000): mayor of Scarborough, Ontario, Canada, 1978 to 1988
- George Harrison (1943–2001): singer-songwriter, member of the Beatles and founder of the Traveling Wilburys and HandMade Films - inducted into the Rock and Roll Hall of Fame - in 1971 pioneered the Concert for Bangladesh, the first humanitarian benefit rock concert
- Sir Rex Harrison (1908–1990): actor, inducted into the Hollywood Walk of Fame
- Thomas Harrison (1815–1888): shipping magnate, co-founded with James Harrison the Harrison Line, which lost 30 of its 46 ships during WWII
- William Harrison (1812–1860): captain of the Isambard Kingdom Brunel's SS Great Eastern, the largest ship for four decades
- Bill Harry (born 1938): creator of Mersey Beat, an important newspaper of the early 1960s focused on the Liverpool music scene - author of 25 books
- Ian Hart (born 1964): actor known for playing John Lennon in Backbeat and for playing Professor Quirrell in Harry Potter and the Philosopher's Stone
- Jesse Hartley (1780–1860): first full-time dock engineer, designed Royal Albert Dock, Stanley Dock and Bramley-Moore Dock
- John Hartnup Jr. (1841–1892): astronomer, second director of the Liverpool Observatory
- Colin Harvey (born 1944): footballer, manager of Everton F.C.
- Derek Hatton (born 1948): controversial former politician, most famous for his opposition to Margaret Thatcher's Conservative government
- John Liptrot Hatton (1810–1886): composer and singer
- Sir Bertram Fox Hayes (1864–1941): captain of the troopship RMS Olympic and the RMS Majestic
- Paul Heaton: singer-songwriter with the Beautiful South
- Rose Heilbron (1914–2005): Britain's first female king's counsel
- Felicia Hemans: poet, wrote "Casabianca" ("The boy stood on the burning deck ...")
- Adrian Henri: painter and poet
- Joseph W. Herbert: actor, singer and dramatist
- Iz Hesketh: actress and drag performer
- Kenneth Hesketh: composer and professor
- Harold Hilton: golfer, twice won the Open Championship, inducted to the World Golf Hall of Fame
- George Hinckley: Victoria Cross recipient
- Les Hinton: journalist and chairman of Fox Television Stations and News International and CEO of Dow Jones & Company
- William Patrick Hitler: nephew of Adolf Hitler
- Paul Hodkinson: boxer, former WBC featherweight champion
- Charles Thurstan Holland (1863–1941): pioneer of radiology
- Michael Holliday: 1950s singer with two number-one singles, "The Story of My Life" and "Starry Eyed"
- Andy Holligan: boxer, former two-time British and Commonwealth champion
- Alfred Holt (1829–1911): shipping magnate, Blue Funnel Line, SS Agamemnon, the first commercially successful steamship with the fuel economy to trade between China and Britain
- George Holt (1828–1896): shipping magnate, art collector, co-founder of the Lamport and Holt shipping line
- John Holt (1841–1915): shipping magnate, founder of John Holt plc, and co-founder of the Liverpool School of Tropical Medicine
- Robert Durning Holt (1832–1908): first lord mayor of Liverpool
- Peter Hooton: musician and singer
- Clive Hornby: actor, played Jack Sugden in Emmerdale
- Frank Hornby (1863–1936): businessman, founder of Hornby Railways, Meccano and Dinky Toys
- Jeremiah Horrocks (1618–1641): astronomer, first person to accurately predict the transit of Venus
- Ewart Horsfall: gold medallist in the 1912 Stockholm Olympic Games, member of the Horsfall family
- Sir Max Horton (1883–1951): Commander-in-Chief, Western Approaches, credited as a crucial figure in the Allied victory in the Battle of the Atlantic, headquartered at Derby House, Liverpool
- Tommy Horton: golfer
- Mary Hottinger (née Mackie): Liverpool born, Scottish translator and editor of crime, ghost and horror stories
- John Houlding (1833–1902): key figure who created two of the most significant clubs in football, Liverpool F.C. and Everton F.C.
- Sir Robert Houston, 1st Baronet (1853–1926): politician and shipowner, key figure who built New Brighton Tower
- Arthur Benison Hubback (1871–1948): architect and soldier who designed several important buildings in British Malaya
- William Huchinson (1715–1801): inventor of the first lifeboat station in Formby
- Geoffrey Hughes: actor
- Graham Hughes: filmmaker, TV presenter, Guinness World Records holder for being the first person to visit all 193 United Nations member states and several other territories without air travel
- Sir Harrison Hughes, 1st Baronet (1881–1958): businessman, chairman of the Harrison Line and vice-president of the Suez Canal Company
- John Hughes: gold medallist in the art competitions at the 1932 Summer Olympics
- Ken Hughes: film director, most famous for writing and directing the film Chitty Chitty Bang Bang
- Laurie Hughes: footballer, Liverpool F.C., represented England national football team in the 1950 FIFA World Cup
- Shirley Hughes (1927–2022): illustrator and author
- Stan Hugill (1906–1992): sea shanty singer and marine artist who sailed on the Garthpool's final trip
- John Hulley (1832–1875): gymnasiarch of Liverpool and founder of the British Olympic movement in 1865
- Paul Humphreys: musician, co-founded Orchestral Manoeuvres in the Dark
- Carl Hunter: film director, screenwriter and bassist in the Farm
- William Huskisson (1770–1830): member of Parliament, first widely reported passenger train death during the opening of the Liverpool and Manchester Railway, he was struck and fatally injured by locomotive Stephenson's Rocket
- Chris Huston: musician, record producer and recording engineer, successful albums with Led Zeppelin and the Who
- John Hutchinson (1825–1865): chemist and industrialist
- Eunice Huthart: stuntwoman and stunt coordinator in Hollywood films
- James Hype (born 1989): DJ and music producer

== I ==
- Charlotte Iliffe, Baroness Iliffe (1881–1972): aristocrat, philanthropist and suffragist
- William Imrie (1836–1906): shipping magnate, co-founder of the Oceanic Steam Navigation Company known as the White Star Line
- Philip Ingham (born 1955): scientist
- Charles Inman (1791–1858): director of the Bank of Liverpool that became Martins Bank in 1928
- William Inman (1825–1881): shipping magnate, owner of the Inman Line and the SS City of Glasgow also SS City of Boston
- Nigel Ipinson (born 1970): musician, songwriter, music producer for Orchestral Manoeuvres in the Dark, the Stone Roses, Hot Chocolate
- Andrew Irvine (1902–1924): mountaineer
- Colin Irwin (born 1957): footballer, Liverpool F.C.
- Samuel Isaac (1812–1886): merchant and promoter of the Mersey Railway tunnel, the oldest underground railway line outside London
- Jason Isaacs (born 1963): actor, played Lucius Malfoy in the Harry Potter films
- J. Bruce Ismay (1862–1937): chairman of the White Star Line and president of the International Mercantile Marine Company, highest ranking officer to survive the RMS Titanic disaster
- Thomas Henry Ismay (1837–1899): shipping magnate, established White Star Line in 1868

== J ==
- Amy Jackson (born 1992): actor
- Glenda Jackson (1936–2023): multiple Oscar-winning actress and former Labour Party MP
- Tony Jackson (1940–2003): musician, of the Searchers
- Brian Jacques (1939–2011): author of the Redwall series of children's fantasy books
- Raza Jaffrey: actor, singer
- Daniel Willis James (1832–1907): merchant of Phelps Dodge
- Frank Linsly James (1851–1890): explorer
- Hilda James (1904–1982): swimmer, inducted into the International Swimming Hall of Fame
- Andy Jameson (born 1965): swimmer, Olympic medallist
- Helen Jameson (born 1963): swimmer, Olympic medallist
- Tony Jardine (born 1952): motorsports journalist
- Francis Jeffers (born 1981): footballer
- Edward Turner Jeffery (1843–1927): railway executive
- William Stanley Jevons: political economist and logician, one of the initiators of the marginal revolution, developer of Jevons paradox
- Paul Jewell: footballer, club manager
- Arthur Johnson: (1879–1929): footballer, historic player of Real Madrid CF having been part of first-ever team and serving as the first-ever manager
- David Johnson: footballer, England international, won three European cups and was one of seven Liverpool-born footballers who won the 1981 European Cup final
- Holly Johnson: singer-songwriter, Frankie Goes to Hollywood
- Joseph Johnson (1780–1827): master maker of clocks, watches, and chronometers
- Sir Thomas Johnson (1664–1723): politician, helped promote the Old Dock, the first commercial wet dock
- Katarina Johnson-Thompson: heptathlete, 2024 Summer Olympics silver medallist
- Banner Johnstone (1882–1964): rower, Olympic gold medallist
- Natasha Jonas: boxer, former WBC and IBF welterweight champion, first black female boxing manager
- Alfred Jones (1819–1900): artist
- Sir Alfred Lewis Jones (1845–1909): shipping magnate, owner of the Elder Dempster Lines (the sinking of SS Falaba gave rise to the Thrasher incident during WWI), founded Bank of British West Africa and First Bank of Nigeria (Nigeria's oldest bank), founded Liverpool School of Tropical Medicine
- Alfred Stowell Jones: Victoria Cross recipient
- Curtis Jones: footballer, Inter Milan and England international
- David Jones: Victoria Cross recipient
- Jack Jones: union leader
- Ken Jones: actor, appeared in TV shows such as The Liver Birds, The Squirrels and Jesus of Nazareth
- Laurence Jones: blues rock musician
- Philip Jones: First Sea Lord and Chief of the Naval Staff
- Sir Robert Jones, 1st Baronet (1857–1933): buried at Liverpool Cathedral
- Simon Jones: guitarist in the rock band the Verve
- Stephen Jones: milliner
- Charles Joughin: baker on the Titanic (last survivor to leave the Titanic)

== K ==
- Odel Kamara: boxer
- Miles Kane: singer and musician
- Ravi Kapoor: actor and filmmaker
- Mikinosuke Kawaishi (1899–1969): "father of British Japanese judo", established a school in Liverpool with Gunji Koizumi, introducing judo to the UK
- Ben Kay: rugby union player, member of England's 2003 Rugby World Cup winning team
- Gillian Kearney: actress, Casualty, Emmerdale
- Missy Bo Kearns: footballer
- Claire Keelan: actress
- Angela Kelly: fashion designer and dressmaker, who served as personal assistant and senior dresser to Queen Elizabeth II
- Margaret Kelly: swimmer, Olympic silver medallist
- Stan Kelly-Bootle: academic, author, folk singer-songwriter, author of several books on computing
- John Philip Kemble (1757–1823): actor
- Captain Henry George Kendall (1874–1965): of the RMS Empress of Ireland when it sank with the crew almost entirely from Merseyside
- Paul Aloysius Kenna: Victoria Cross recipient
- Sir Anthony Kenny: academic, writer on religion and philosophy, former president of the British Academy and current president of the Royal Institute of Philosophy
- Bill Kenwright (1945–2023): West End theatre and film producer and former Everton F.C. chairman
- Phil Kenzie: multi-saxophone player, one of the greatest of all-time, working on albums with the Beatles, the Eagles, Black Sabbath, Stevie Nicks, Carly Simon, Rod Stewart, David Bowie and many others
- Billy Kinsley: musician who had chart success with the Merseybeats and Liverpool Express
- Edmund Kirby (1838–1920): architect
- Josh Kirby: artist and illustrator
- John Kirk: Victoria Cross recipient
- Ian Kirkham: saxophonist, best known for his playing with soul band Simply Red
- Billy Kirsopp: footballer, Everton F.C.
- Billy J. Kramer: pop singer
- Dorothy Kuya: political and anti-racism activist

== L ==
- Brian Labone: footballer, Everton F.C., England international
- Alexander Lafone: Victoria Cross recipient
- Keith J. Laidler: pioneer in chemical kinetics and the physical chemistry of enzymes
- John Laird (1805–1874): founder of Cammell Laird, a ship building and repair company founded in 1828, including HMS Ark Royal and HMS Rodney that played a major role in sinking the German battleship Bismarck during WWII and was involved in building the Queen Elizabeth-class aircraft carriers
- Macgregor Laird (1808–1861): founder of the British and American Steam Navigation Company (SS Sirius was the first holder of the Blue Riband for the fastest westbound transatlantic crossing), founded the African Steamship Company
- William Laird (1780–1841): shipbuilder and developer of Hamilton Square and Birkenhead
- Rickie Lambert: footballer, England international
- John Lander: British rower, gold medal in the 1928 Olympics
- Judd Lander: musician, director at Warner Music Group, harmonicist on Culture Club's Colour by Numbers album
- Charlie Landsborough: musician, songwriter and country singer
- Carla Lane (1928–2016): TV writer, creator of sitcoms The Liver Birds, Butterflies and Bread
- Lynda La Plante (born 1943): screenwriter and actress
- James Larkin (1874–1947): trade unionist and socialist, co-founder of the Irish Labour Party
- Rupert de Larrinaga (born 1928): skier who competed at the 1952 Winter Olympics, owner of the Larrinaga Steamship Company and Larrinaga Palace
- Frank Laskier (1912–1949): WWII sailor who was a public icon for recruiting new mariners
- Eddie Latta (1902–1972): songwriter, wrote songs for George Formby
- Chris Lawler (born 1943): footballer, Liverpool F.C. and England international
- Fred Lawless: playwright and TV writer
- Sir Terry Leahy: businessman, credited with taking Tesco to market dominance
- Sammy Lee: footballer, coach of the England national football team and a member of the Joe Fagan team that won the 1984 European Cup Final
- Zack Lee: martial arts actor
- Spencer Leigh: film and TV actor
- Spencer Leigh: presenter of the BBC Radio Merseyside show On the Beat
- Cynthia Lennon: artist, author and first wife of John Lennon and mother of Julian Lennon
- John Lennon (1940–1980): singer-songwriter inducted into the Rock and Roll Hall of Fame as a member of the Beatles and later formed the Plastic Ono Band
- Julian Lennon: musician, photographer and philanthropist, son of John and Cynthia Lennon
- Frank Lester: Victoria Cross recipient
- William Lever (1851–1925): industrialist and shipowner of the Palm Line, founder Lady Lever Art Gallery at Port Sunlight (Hume Hall was the venue for Ringo Star's first official performance as a Beatle)
- Sir Brian Leveson: high court judge
- Paul Lewis: musical artist
- Frederick Leyland (1831–1892): shipping magnate, the Leyland Line ship the SS Californian arrived after the sinking of the Titanic and looked for survivors
- Phil Liggett: cycling commentator
- William Linton (1791–1876): artist
- Jimmy Lloyd: boxer who earned a bronze medal at the 1960 Summer Olympics
- Matt Lloyd: sledge hockey player
- Sir Oliver Lodge (1851–1940): first professor of physics at University College Liverpool, pioneer in the science and technology that led to the development of radio
- Janice Long: influential Radio 1 DJ of the 1980s, sister of Keith Chegwin
- Gordon Lorenz (1943–2011): record producer and songwriter
- Chris Lowe: musician, singer and songwriter, studied architecture at University of Liverpool before joining synth-pop duo Pet Shop Boys in 1985
- Malcolm Lowry: poet and novelist
- Gertrud Luckner: social worker involved in the German resistance to Nazism
- Sir Henry Lucy: political journalist, first great Lobby correspondent, Mount Henry Lucy is named for him
- Arthur Lyon (1851–1905): rugby union, Liverpool F.C. provided three to play in the first international rugby match
- Mick Lyons: footballer, Everton F.C.
- Nigel Lythgoe: former dancer, now producer of talent shows such as American Idol and So You Think You Can Dance

== M ==
- Sir Donald MacAlister: educated at Liverpool Institute for Boys
- William MacDonald (1924–2015): serial killer who committed his crimes in Australia
- Jem Mace (1831–1910): heavyweight boxing champion, 34th inductee into the International Boxing Hall of Fame in 1990, lived in Liverpool and buried in Anfield Cemetery
- Charles MacIver (1866–1935): shipping magnate, co-founder of the Cunard Line and Olympic silver medallist, sailing in the 12 Metre class, lived in Calderstones House
- David MacIver (1840–1907): shipping magnate, pioneer of transatlantic shipping, D&C MacIver was closely associated with Sir Samuel Cunard in the formation of the Cunard Line
- William MacKune (1882–1955): gymnast, Olympic medalist
- Hattie Mahood: Baptist deacon, suffragist and temperance campaigner
- Callum Makin: boxer
- Beryl Marsden: R&B pop singer, Shotgun Express
- Betty Marsden (1919–1998): actress
- Gerry Marsden: singer with Gerry and the Pacemakers, number 1 UK hit "You'll Never Walk Alone" went on to become a football anthem
- John P. Marshall: investor and owner of Hungarian football clubs Vác FC and Egri FC
- Michael Marshall: skeptical activist, editor of The Skeptic magazine, director of the Good Thinking Society
- Alvin Martin: footballer, England international
- John Martin: comedian
- Frank Mason: jockey, Grand National winner
- Richard George Masters: Victoria Cross recipient
- Charles James Mathews (1803–1878): actor, theatre manager and playwright
- Derry Mathews (born 1983): boxer, former British and Commonwealth lightweight champion
- Robert Maudsley (born 1953): serial killer, in solitary confinement in a glass cell since 1979 and the longest serving prisoner in Britain
- Sharon Maughan (born 1950): actress
- James Maury (1746–1940): first consul of the United States in Liverpool
- Gary Mavers (born 1964): actor
- Lee Mavers (born 1962): singer-songwriter and rhythm guitarist with the La's
- James Maybrick (1838–1889): Jack the Ripper suspect
- Michael Maybrick (1841–1913): composer and singer
- John McAlle: footballer
- Jason McAteer: footballer, Republic of Ireland international
- Les McAteer: boxer, former British and Commonwealth middleweight champion
- Pat McAteer: boxer, former British and Commonwealth middleweight champion
- Dave McCabe: singer-songwriter, guitarist for the Zutons
- John McCabe: musician and composer
- Nick McCabe: guitarist with rock band the Verve
- Donald "Ginger" McCain: racehorse trainer, four-time winner of the Grand National steeplechase, including a record-breaking three wins with Red Rum
- Molly McCann: mixed martial artist, UFC fighter
- Sir Paul McCartney: singer-songwriter inducted into the Rock and Roll Hall of Fame as a member of the Beatles and later formed Wings, founded MPL Communications
- Jim McCarty: musician inducted into the Rock and Roll Hall of Fame as a member of the Yardbirds
- Liz McClarnon: singer, member of the former girl group Atomic Kitten
- Andy McCluskey: musician, singer-songwriter with Orchestral Manoeuvres in the Dark, founder of Atomic Kitten
- Len McCluskey: general secretary of Unite the Union
- Natalie McCool: singer-songwriter and guitarist signed to Steve Levine's label Hubris Records
- Ian McCulloch: singer-songwriter, lead vocalist in rock band Echo & the Bunnymen
- Herbert Gladstone McDavid (1898–1966): war-time minister of sea transport, managing director of the Blue Funnel Line
- Terry McDermott: footballer, Liverpool F.C. and England international, won three European Cups
- John McDonnell: politician
- Roy McFarland: footballer, England international
- Joe McGann: actor, Casualty and played Edward Hutchinson in Hollyoaks
- Mark McGann: actor, played John Lennon in the TV film John and Yoko: A Love Story and several other roles
- Paul McGann: actor, starred in cult classic film Withnail and I, The Monocled Mutineer and Doctor Who, amongst others
- Stephen McGann: actor and science communicator best known for his portrayal of Dr Turner in Call the Midwife
- Mike McGear: photographer, musician, member of the Scaffold, younger brother of Beatles bassist Paul McCartney
- Roger McGough: performance poet
- Jimmy McGovern: (born 1945): writer on Brookside he went on to write Cracker and the film Priest as well as the reality based drama Hillsborough
- Victor McGuire: actor
- Grace McKenzie: swimmer, Olympic medallist
- Hugh McKenzie: Victoria Cross recipient
- Steve McMahon: footballer Liverpool F.C., Everton F.C. and England international
- Steve McManaman: footballer, Liverpool F.C., Real Madrid CF and England international, first English player to win the UEFA Champions League with a non-English club and first English player to win twice
- Jack McMullen: actor
- Ian McNabb (born 1960): singer-songwriter with the Icicle Works
- John McNally (born 1941): musician and singer for the Searchers, the longest running pop group since 1957
- Tony McNamara (1929–2015): footballer, Liverpool F.C. and Everton F.C., first footballer to play in all four divisions
- Esther McVey (born 1967): politician, TV presenter
- Jimmy Melia (born 1937): footballer, Liverpool F.C.
- George Melly (1926–2007): jazz and blues singer; art critic and historian
- Sergeant Joe Mercer (1889–1927): footballer, father of Everton F.C. and England international captain and manager Joe Mercer
- Freddie Mercury (1946–1991, born Farrokh Bulsara): singer-songwriter, born Zanzibar and moved to England in 1964, in 1969 lived in Penny Lane, Liverpool, playing in the band Ibex, Liverpool radio broadcaster Kenny Everett was an advisor and mentor to Mercury
- John Middleton (1578–1623): claimed at the time to be the tallest man, lived in Speke Hall
- John Milne (1850–1913): professor, geologist, and mining engineer, who invented a seismometer to detect and measure earthquakes
- Jeannie Mole (1841–1912): pioneer of socialism and woman's trade unions
- Joey Molland (1947–2025): guitarist, singer-songwriter, member of Badfinger
- Tommy Molloy: boxer, former British welterweight champion
- Dick Molyneux: football manager, in 1891 Everton F.C. was the first club to lift the league championship trophy at Anfield, it was the first season where nets, penalty kicks and the trophy were used
- George Molyneux: footballer, Everton F.C. and England international
- Stephen Molyneux: British e-learning guru
- Nicholas Monsarrat: author of The Cruel Sea
- Samuel Montagu, 1st Baron Swaythling: banker, founder of Samuel Montagu & Co.
- Richard Moon (1814–1899): chairman of the London and North Western Railway
- Dr Benjamin Moore: credited with the first use of the words National Health Service and the foundation of the State Medical Service Association
- Peter Moore: British-American business executive
- Pippa Moore: ballet dancer
- Sir John Moores (1896–1993): businessman and founder of Littlewoods Pools
- George Moorhouse: footballer, played in the 1930 and 1934 FIFA World Cups, first English footballer to play in a FIFA World Cup
- Mark Moraghan: actor, in Holby City and narrator of Thomas & Friends
- Trevor Morais: musician and drummer
- Ronnie Moran: footballer, Liverpool F.C. a member of the Boot Room coaching staff
- Fidelis Morgan: actress and writer
- Sally Morgan, Baroness Morgan of Huyton: politician, member of the House of Lords
- Steve Morgan: businessman, former chairman of Wolverhampton Wanderers F.C.
- Jerry Morris: pioneer public health physician and reformer
- Robert Morris (1734–1806): American Founding Father, financier and signatory of the Declaration of Independence, established the Bank of North America, owner of the ship Empress of China
- Roger Morris (1933–2001): pioneering railway engineer on the Channel Tunnel
- Tom Morris: businessman, founder of Home Bargains
- David Morrissey: actor, filmmaker, director and producer
- Johnny Morrissey: footballer, Liverpool F.C. and Everton F.C.
- Dennis Mortimer: footballer, captain of Aston Villa F.C. in the 1982 European Cup Final
- Eddie Mosscrop: footballer, England international
- Derek Mountfield: footballer
- Bernie Mullin: sports executive and writer
- Jimmy Mulville: comedian, comedy writer, producer and TV presenter
- John Murphy: musician and composer
- Margaret Murphy: crime novelist
- Matthew Murphy: musician, lead singer of indie rock band the Wombats
- Tom Murphy: artist known for bronze sculptures
- Cora Musk (born Mossley Hill 1923–2011): paternal grandmother of Elon Musk, leaving England to settle in South Africa where she married Walter Musk in 1944
- Max Muspratt: chemist and politician
- Jonathan Myles-Lea: painter

== N ==
- Brian Nash: guitarist, Frankie Goes to Hollywood
- Tom Neil: (1920–2018) WWII flying ace
- Ken Nelson: record producer, three-time Grammy Awards winner with rock band Coldplay
- James Nelson-Joyce: film actor
- Mike Newell footballer, Blackburn Rovers
- Billy Newnes: jockey, won Epsom Oaks
- John Newton (1725–1807): Liverpool sea captain who composed "Amazing Grace"
- Vincent Nichols: leader of England's Roman Catholics
- Elizabeth Nickell-Lean: operatic singer
- Derek Nimmo (1930–1999): actor
- Sir Percy Noble (1880–1955): Commander-in-Chief, Western Approaches, responsible for the safety of British shipping during the Battle of the Atlantic, headquarters at Derby house, Liverpool
- Kevin Nolan: footballer
- Steven Norris: politician and businessman
- Sally Nugent: journalist, TV presenter BBC Breakfast

== O ==
- Tom O'Connor (1939–2021): comedian and TV quiz show host
- Paul O'Grady (1955–2023):, comedian and TV presenter
- Kele Okereke: singer-songwriter in the indie rock band Bloc Party
- John Okill (1687–1773): shipbuilder for the Royal Navy and Merchant Navy
- Nigel Olsson: musician, drummer and backing vocalist for Elton John in the Elton John Band
- Anyika Onuora: Olympic sprinter
- Phina Oruche: actress and model
- Mark O'Toole: singer-songwriter in Frankie Goes to Hollywood
- Brian Oulton: actor
- Alun Owen: screenwriter, brought up in Liverpool, wrote the Beatles' film A Hard Day's Night
- Terry Owen: footballer, father of the 2001 Ballon d'Or winner Michael Owen
- Sir William Leonard Owen: engineer, nuclear engineering
- Lord Ronald Oxburgh, Baron Oxburgh: geologist, geophysicist, member of the House of Lords

== P ==
- Louis Page (1899–1959): footballer, England international
- Bob Paisley (1919–1996): footballer and football manager, associated with Liverpool F.C. for 50 years, Liverpool's most successful manager
- Mark Palios (born 1952): footballer, former chief executive of the Football Association
- Amy Parkinson (1855–1938): poet
- Jack Parkinson (1883–1942): footballer, Liverpool F.C. and England international
- Lily Parr (1905–1978): first woman inducted into the English Football Hall of Fame
- Nikita Parris (born 1994): footballer, women's England international
- John Parrott (born 1964): championship-winning snooker player and TV personality
- Alan Parry (born 1948): TV football commentator
- Rick Parry (born 1955): chairman of the EFL and former chief executive of the Premier League
- Konstantinos Paspatis (1878–1903): possibly the first Liverpool-born Olympic medallist, at the 1896 Summer Olympics in Athens
- Brian Patten: poet
- Larry Paul: boxer, former British light-middleweight champion
- John Peel (1939–2004): radio presenter, noted for bringing many artists such as Fleetwood Mac and Pink Floyd to the mainstream
- T. L. Pelling: co-founded the seafood company John West Foods
- Mike Pender: musician, lead guitar and lead vocalist of the Searchers, the longest running pop group
- Tricia Penrose: actress
- Zak Perzamanos: athlete, trampoline gymnast
- Lady Mary Peters: athlete, pentathlon gold medallist in the 1972 Munich Olympics
- George Philip (1800–1882): cartographer and map publisher
- Dom Phillips: journalist
- Percy Phillips: recording engineer, noted for early recordings of the Quarrymen, a blue plaque marks his former home
- Tony Phillips: artist and printmaker
- Sir James Picton (1805–1889): architect who established Picton Reading Room and Hornby Library
- Paddy Pimblett: mixed martial artist, UFC fighter
- Pete Postlethwaite (1946–2011): actor
- John Power: singer-songwriter with Cast and bassist with the La's
- Philip Louis Pratley: architect and civil engineer
- Edward Carter Preston (1885–1965): artist of sculpture and medals
- Steve Prestwich (1954–2011): former drummer of Australian band Cold Chisel
- David Price (born 1983): boxer, former British and Commonwealth heavyweight champion
- Richard Priestman (born 1955): Olympic archer and coach
- Arthur Herbert Procter (1890–1973): Victoria Cross recipient
- Dominic Purcell (born 1970): actor
- Richard Pyros (born 1987): actor

== Q ==
- Sir Anthony Quayle (1913–1989): actor
- Sam Quek: hockey player, gold medallist in 2016 Summer Olympics and first female captain on the quiz show A Question of Sport
- Richard Quest: CNN TV presenter and journalist
- Tommy Quickly: singer, formerly of the Remo Four
- Tony Quigley: boxer, former British super middleweight champion
- Abdullah Quilliam (1856–1932): founder of England's first mosque and Islamic centre, and founder of Association of British Muslims
- Ged Quinn: artist and musician, member of the Teardrop Explodes
- Micky Quinn: footballer

== R ==
- Lynne Randell (1949–2007): singer, Australia's first teen pop star
- Heidi Range (born 1983): singer, former member of the Sugababes
- J. B. Ranson (1860–1935): captain of the RMS Baltic which rescued 1700 passengers and crew from the RMS Republic - this was the first marine rescue made possible by radio - it brought worldwide attention to the new technology
- Sir Frederick Radcliffe (1861–1953): known as the "Father of the Liverpool Cathedral" which is the worlds tallest non spired church tower and has the largest footprint after St Peter's, Rome, only Seville Cathedral out ranks it in gothic volume
- William Ratcliffe (1884–1963): Victoria Cross recipient
- James Ravenscroft (1854–1931): cricketer
- Eleanor Rathbone (1872–1946): independent member of Parliament and pioneer of family allowance and women's rights
- Richard Rathbone (1788–1860): merchant who attended the 1840 World Anti-Slavery Convention
- William Rathbone II (1696–1746): prominent citizen, philanthropist and founder of Rathbones Group
- William Rathbone V (1787–1868): politician, merchant, ship-owner, responsible of distribution of New England Relief funds during the Irish Famine of 1845–1852
- William Rathbone VI (1819–1902): politician and philanthropist, established the first district nursing service at the Liverpool Royal Infirmary in 1862, established Liverpool Training School and Home for Nurses and the Queen's Nursing Institute
- Sir Simon Rattle (born 1955): orchestra conductor
- Austin Rawlinson (1902–2000): swimmer, inducted into the International Swimming Hall of Fame
- Paul Raymond (1925–2008): publisher, pornographic magazine mogul
- J. A. Raynes (1870 - after 1916): composer and conductor best known for his contributions to Broadway musicals
- Jack Rea: NXT UK wrestler
- Phil Redmond: screenwriter, created Grange Hill, Brookside and Hollyoaks
- Jamie Reid: punk visual artist and anarchist
- Peter Reid: footballer, Everton F.C. and England international
- Robin Reid: boxer, WBC champion, won a bronze medal at the 1992 Summer Olympics
- Alberto Remedios: opera singer
- James Renwick (1790–1863): scientist and engineer, his son James Renwick Jr. was the architect of St. Patrick's Cathedral, New York
- Arthur Herbert Lindsay Richardson: Victoria Cross recipient
- Miranda Richardson: actress
- Bill Ridding: footballer, 1958 FA Cup Final winning manager
- Peter Rigby: entrepreneur, founder of Rigby Group
- Ellis Rimmer: footballer, England international
- Jimmy Rimmer: football goalkeeper, first English player to win European Cup with two clubs
- John Rimmer: athlete, Olympic gold medallist
- Andy Ripley: rugby union player for England (24 caps) and the British and Irish Lions on their unbeaten 1974 tour of South Africa
- Kate Robbins: impressionist, cousin of Paul McCartney, sister of Ted Robbins
- Ted Robbins: comic, actor and broadcaster, cousin of Paul McCartney, brother of Kate Robbins
- Nigel Roberts: computer scientist
- Anne Robinson: journalist, host of TV game show The Weakest Link
- Bertram Fletcher Robinson: sportsman, journalist, editor, author and Liberal Unionist Party campaigner
- Ken Robinson (1950–2020): educationalist
- Robert Robinson (1927–2011): broadcaster
- James Roby: rugby league international for England rugby league team and Great Britain national rugby league team
- Crissy Rock: actress and comedian
- Ernie Roderick: boxer, former British and European welterweight and middleweight champion
- Alfred Edward Rodewald (1862–1903): composer and conductor
- Lord Bill Rodgers: politician, member of SDP Gang of Four
- Paul Rooney: visual and sound artist
- Wayne Rooney: footballer, Manchester United all-time record scorer, all-time most-capped outfield footballer with the England national football team (120 caps)
- William Roscoe (1753–1831): banker, writer, best known as one of England's first abolitionists
- Milton Rosmer (1881–1971): actor who played George Burns in Atlantic Ferry about Liverpool brothers David MacIver and Charles MacIver and the early formation of the Cunard Line
- Sir Ronald Ross (1857–1932): medical officer, director of Liverpool School of Tropical Medicine and Nobel prize winner, discover of the mosquito transmission of malaria
- Norman Rossington: actor, best remembered for is roles in the Beatles film A Hard Day's Night and Double Trouble starring Elvis Presley
- Leonard Rossiter: actor who played landlord Rigsby in the Yorkshire TV series Rising Damp, and the title character in The Fall and Rise of Reginald Perrin and other roles
- Steve Rotheram, Labour politician (former MP and metro mayor of Liverpool)
- Alan Rouse (1951–1986): mountaineer, first British climber to summit K2, the second-highest mountain on Earth
- Patricia Routledge (born 1929): actress, star of Keeping Up Appearances
- Stan Rowan (1924–1997): boxer, British and British Empire bantamweight champion
- Geoff Rowley (born 1976): pro skate boarder
- Herbert James Rowse (1887–1963): architect whose works included India Buildings and Martins Bank Building
- Agness Maude Royden: suffragist, author, preacher, philosopher, pacifist, who was in The Black Book
- Thomas Royden, 1st Baron Royden (1871–1950): chairman of the shipbuilding company Thomas Royden & Sons and went on to be chairman of the Cunard Line
- Joe Royle (born 1949): footballer, England international, manager of Everton F.C.
- Lita Roza (1926–2008): singer, first woman to have a number-one record in the UK music charts
- Stephen Rubin (born 1937): chairman and co-owner of the Pentland Group, originally the Liverpool Shoe Company founded in 1932
- Alan Rudkin (1941–2010): boxer, former British and Commonwealth and European champion
- Robert Runcie (1921–2000): Anglican archbishop
- Edward Rushton (1756–1814): blind anti-slavery campaigner who founded the Royal School for the Blind, the oldest school for the blind in continuous operation
- Willy Russell: playwright, screenwriter
- Mike Rutherford: musician and songwriter, inducted into the Rock and Roll Hall of Fame as a member of Genesis and Mike and the Mechanics
- Paul Rutherford: singer-dancer, Frankie Goes to Hollywood
- John Rylands (1801–1888): owner of the largest textile company

== S ==
- Herbert Samuel (1870–1963): political statesman and British Jewish diplomat
- Robert Sangster (1936–2004): businessman, founded Vernons Pools, racehorse owner/breeder, established the Coolmore Stud
- Sir Charles Santley (1834–1922): opera singer, first singer to be honoured with a knighthood
- Sunetra Sarker: actress
- Kevin Satchell: boxer, former British, Commonwealth and European champion
- Ron Saunders: footballer, Aston Villa F.C. manager who won the league and European cups in the 1981–82 season
- Alexei Sayle: comedian and writer
- Gia Scala (1934–1972): Hollywood film actress
- Gustav Christian Schwabe (1813–1897): Hamburg-born financier
- Richard Seddon (1845–1906): politician, former prime minister of New Zealand
- Peter Serafinowicz: actor and comic writer, wrote the satire Look Around You, and voiced Darth Maul in Star Wars: Episode I – The Phantom Menace
- Will Sergeant: musician, guitarist in Echo and the Bunnymen
- Reginald Servaes: commander of the Reserve Fleet, vice admiral
- Anthony Shaffer: dramatist of Sleuth and The Wicker Man, twin brother of Peter Shaffer
- Peter Shaffer: dramatist of Equus and Amadeus, twin brother of Anthony Shaffer
- Christopher Shannon: menswear designer
- Chris Sharrock: drummer for the band Beady Eye, former member of the Icicle Works, the La's and Oasis
- Alia Shelesh: YouTuber known for her reaction videos
- Chris Shepherd: TV writer, film writer, producer
- Kate Sheppard (1848–1934): New Zealand organiser for universal suffrage
- Cornelius Sherlock: architect, co-designed the Walker Art Gallery with Henry Hill Vale
- Danny Shone: footballer
- Peter Shore: Labour politician
- Pete Shotton: businessman, member of the Quarrymen that later became the Beatles
- Lady Sheila Sim, Baroness Attenborough: film and theatre actress
- Mark Simpson: composer and clarinettist
- William Muirhead Simpson (1844–1926): founder of international food and drink Princes Group
- Joey Singleton: boxer, former British light-welterweight champion
- Peter Sissons: journalist and newsreader
- Carly Skelly: boxer
- James Skelly: musician, songwriter and record producer, the Coral
- Ken Skupski: tennis player
- Neal Skupski: tennis player
- Elisabeth Sladen: actress, best remembered as a Doctor Who assistant
- Callum Smith: boxer, former WBA (super) and Ring super middleweight champion
- Edward Smith (1850–1912): captain of the White Star Line ship RMS Titanic
- Herbert Tyson Smith: artist and sculptor
- Sir John Smith: football chairman, Liverpool F.C.
- Liam Smith: boxer, former WBO light-middleweight champion
- Michael Smith: 2023 darts champion
- Paul Smith: boxer, former British super-middleweight champion
- Stephen Smith: boxer, former British and Commonwealth champion
- Steve Smith: Olympic high-jumping medallist
- Tommy Smith: footballer, Liverpool F.C., scored the second goal in the 1977 European Cup final, former owner of the Cavern Club
- Edward Smith-Stanley, 12th Earl of Derby (1752–1834): of Knowsley Hall whose family had a long history of horse racing, established the Epsom Derby and Epsom Oaks
- Edward Smith-Stanley, 14th Earl of Derby: three-time prime minister of the United Kingdom, noted as the longest serving party leader in Britain
- Sonia: pop singer
- Frank Soo (1914–1991): footballer, the only person of Asian background to play for the England national football team
- Annie Speirs: swimmer, Olympic gold medallist
- C. H. Stanley: established and co-founded seafood company John West Foods
- Edward Stanley, 18th Earl of Derby: president of the Professional Golfers' Association, involved in the inclusion of continental European golfers in the Ryder Cup
- Frederick Stanley, 16th Earl of Derby: lord mayor of Liverpool, governor general of Canada, bequeathed the Stanley Cup, racehorse owner/breeder, established Stanley House Stables
- James Stanley, 7th Earl of Derby (1607–1651): established the Manx Derby precursor of now celebrated Derby
- Olaf Stapledon: author
- Graham Stark: actor
- Michael Starke: actor
- Freddie Starr: comedian, impressionist, singer and 1994 Grand National-winning owner
- Sir Ringo Starr: drummer, singer-songwriter, inducted into the Rock and Roll Hall of Fame as a member of the Beatles
- Alison Steadman: actress
- A. G. Steel: amateur cricketer, noted for recording the first Test century and five-wicket haul at Lord's cricket ground
- Robert Steel (1839–1903): chess player, conceived and organised the first international, long-distance chess match
- Harry Steere: (1914–1944) WWII flying ace
- Thomas Steers (1672–1750): England's first civil engineer, built the first commercial wet dock in Liverpool and the first mercantile dock system
- George Stephenson (1781–1848): "Father of Railways", pioneered the first transport tunnels under cities, Wapping Tunnel, Waterloo Tunnel and Victoria Tunnel
- Nessie Stewart-Brown (1864–1958): co-founder of Liverpool Women's Suffrage Society the sister of Julia Solly
- Adrian Scott Stokes (1854–1935): artist known for landscape paintings
- Sir Wilfred Stokes (1860–1927): inventor of the Stokes mortar used during WWI, the first single-person transportable mortar
- Robert Stopford (1901–1976): bishop of London
- Brad Strand: boxer, former WBO European champion
- Gordon Stretton (1887–1983): musician, credited with introducing jazz to Latin America
- Ronald Stuart (1886–1954): Victoria Cross recipient during World War I and captain of the RMS Empress of Britain from 1934 to 1937
- Alan Stubbs: footballer, Everton F.C.
- George Stubbs (1724–1806): artist, known for horse paintings
- John Stevenson Stubbs (1894–1963): WWI flying ace
- Stuart Sutcliffe: early member of the Beatles
- Kenny Swain: one of four footballers from Merseyside who was a member of Ron Saunders' team that won the league and 1982 European Cup Final with Aston Villa F.C.
- Claire Sweeney: actress, singer and TV presenter
- Clive Swift: actor and songwriter
- David Swift: actor
- Joy Swift: inventor of the murder mystery weekend
- John Samuel Swire (1825–1898): shipping magnate, founder of China Navigation Company and Swire
- Terry Sylvester: singer-songwriter inducted into the Rock and Roll Hall of Fame as a member of the Hollies
- Magda Szubanski: Australian actress

== T ==
- Raymond Tallis: professor of geriatric medicine and poet
- Jimmy Tarbuck: comedian, entertainer, TV host
- Liza Tarbuck: actress, TV and radio presenter, daughter of Jimmy Tarbuck
- Banastre Tarleton (1754–1833): politician, led the British Legion in the American War of Independence
- Nel Tarleton: boxer, former British champion on three separate occasions and first to win the Lonsdale Belt outright twice
- Sir Henry Tate (1819–1899): sugar magnate, established the Tate Britain and Tate Liverpool art galleries
- Tanya Tate: adult film star
- Troy Tate: musician, the Teardrop Explodes
- Derek Taylor: publicist for the Beatles, the Byrds, the Beach Boys, the Mamas & the Papas, co-founded the pioneering Monterey International Pop Festival
- Jodie Taylor: footballer, England international
- Ted Taylor: football goalkeeper, England international
- Derek Temple: footballer Everton F.C.
- Wally Thom: boxer, won the Lonsdale Belt outright, European and Commonwealth champion twice
- Heidi Thomas: screenwriter and playwright best known for screen adaptations including I Capture the Castle, Cranford and Call the Midwife
- Walter Aubrey Thomas: architect, designed the Royal Liver Building
- George Thompson: one of the most important abolition and human rights lecturers in the UK and US, attended the 1860 World Anti-Slavery Convention
- Sir Ivan Thompson (1894–1970): commodore of the Cunard Line, troopship captain in WWI and WWII
- Phil Thompson: footballer, captain of Liverpool F.C. in the 1981 European Cup Final, captain of the England national football team
- Bill Tidy: cartoonist
- Dick Tiger (1929–1971): boxer, former world middleweight champion (twice) and light-heavyweight champion
- Darren Till: mixed martial artist, UFC welterweight
- John Tinniswood: accountant and supercentenarian, world's oldest living man until his death in 2024
- Frank Tobin (1849–1927): rugby union, Liverpool F.C., played for the oldest rugby union club and played in the first international match, also the first international match in any code of football
- Ricky Tomlinson: actor and comedian
- Mirabel Topham: actress and former owner of Aintree Racecourse home of the Grand National and Aintree Motor Racing Circuit that hosted Formula One British Grand Prix five times
- Charles Towne (1763–1840): painter of landscapes and animals including Old Billy, the longest-living horse on record
- Robert Tressell (1870–1911): Irish author of The Ragged-Trousered Philanthropists
- Norman Tunna: George Cross recipient
- Jack Turner: boxer, WBA international super-flyweight champion
- William Thomas Turner (1856–1933): captain of the RMS Lusitania when it sank, the first of 22 Cunard ships lost in WWI
- George Turpin: boxer who won a bronze medal at the 1972 Summer Olympics
- Rita Tushingham: actress
- Tommy Tynan: footballer
- Cathy Tyson: actress
- Liam Tyson: guitarist, a band member of Cast, performed, recorded and wrote with Led Zeppelin front man Robert Plant

== V ==
- Henry Hill Vale (1831–1875): architect, co-designed the Walker Art Gallery with Cornelius Sherlock
- Frankie Vaughan (1928–1999): singer, dancer and film actor
- Ivan Vaughan (1942–1993): musician and author, introduced the future Beatles Lennon and McCartney
- Norman Vaughan (1923–2002): comedian, show host and actor
- Colin Vearncombe (1962–2016): singer with 1987 hit "Wonderful Life"
- F. X. Velarde (1897–1960): architect
- Sir Edmund Vestey (1866–1953): shipping magnate of the Blue Star Line, co-founder of Vestey Holdings, once Britain's most powerful farming empire
- Lord William Vestey (1859–1940): shipping magnate of the Blue Star Line and co-founder of Vestey Holdings, pioneers of refrigeration technology to supply meat, poultry, eggs and fish globally

== W ==
- James Iredell Waddell: commander of the Liverpool ship CSS Shenandoah the vessel was surrendered in Liverpool marking the last official surrender of the American Civil War
- Tony Waddington: songwriter, record producer
- Pete Wade: blues/rock guitarist with Engine, and Connie Lush & Blues Shouter
- Neville Wadia (1911–1996): member of the Wadia family and chairman of Bombay Dyeing of the Wadia Group, pioneers of the shipbuilding industry that oversaw the building of Asia's first dry dock in 1750
- Walter Wadsworth: footballer, Liverpool F.C.
- Charles Wakefield, 1st Viscount Wakefield: founder of Castrol lubricant company
- Bianca Walkden: three-time taekwondo champion and Olympic medallist
- Captain Frederic John Walker (1896–1944): the most successful anti-submarine warfare commander during the Battle of the Atlantic buried at sea in Liverpool Bay
- Horace Walker (1838–1908): mountaineer who made many notable first ascents, including Mount Elbrus and Grandes Jorasses
- Lucy Walker (c. 1836–1916): pioneer mountaineer, first woman to climb the Matterhorn
- William Walker (1856–1933): Grand National winning owner who helped establish the National Stud and Irish National Stud
- Keith Wallace (1961–2000): boxer, former Commonwealth flyweight champion, was Frank Warren's first professional signing
- Nigel Walley (born 1941): musician
- Joan Walmsley, Baroness Walmsley (born 1943): politician, member of the House of Lords
- Jonathan Walters (born 1983): footballer, Republic of Ireland international
- Samuel Walters (1811–1882): marine painter, of the SS Atlantic and Ocean Monarch
- Stephen Walters (born 1975): actor
- Tom Waring: footballer, England international
- Curtis Warren: Liverpool Mafia boss
- William Warwick: first captain of the Queen Elizabeth 2 ocean liner, his son Commodore Ronald W. Warwick was the first master of the Queen Mary 2
- Alfred Waterhouse (1830–1905): architect
- Edwin Waterhouse (1841–1917): co-founded PriceWaterhouse, one of Big Four accounting firms
- Sid Watkins (1928–2012): president of Fédération Internationale de l'Automobile and Formula One institute of motorsport safety
- Andrew Watson (1856–1921): likely the first black professional footballer, played for Bootle F.C.
- Billy Watson (1890–1955): footballer, England international
- Dave Watson (born 1961): footballer, Everton F.C. England international
- William Watson (1873–1961): racing driver, won the 1908 Isle of Man RAC Tourist Trophy, the oldest automobile race
- Jamie Webster (born 1994): singer-songwriter
- John Webster (1916–1940): WWII flying ace
- Richie Wenton (born 1967): boxer, former British super bantamweight champion
- Frank Westerton (1866–1923): stage and silent-film actor
- James Wharton (1813–1856): pioneer boxer inducted to the International Boxing Hall of Fame
- Johnny Wheeler (1928–2019): footballer, Liverpool F.C., England international
- Albert White (1892–1917): Victoria Cross recipient
- Charley White (1891–1959): boxer, world title challenger on several occasions
- Wildman Whitehouse (1816–1890): inventor, sent the first telecommunications to the United States
- Alan Whittle (born 1950): footballer, Everton F.C.
- Dame May Whitty (1865–1948): film actress, first stage and film actress to receive a damehood
- Henry Tingle Wilde (1872–1912): chief officer on the RMS Titanic
- Kitty Wilkinson (1785–1860): called the "Saint of the Slums" due to her public wash house movement
- Anne Williams: campaigned for justice following the Hillsborough disaster
- Cliff Williams: musician, inducted into the Rock and Roll Hall of Fame as a member of Australian hard rock band AC/DC
- Kathryn Williams: singer-songwriter
- Martyn S. Williams: mountain and wilderness guide, first person to lead expeditions to the three extremes, South Pole (1989), North Pole (1992) and Everest (1991)
- Joseph Williamson (1769–1840): philanthropist and builder of the Williamson Tunnels
- Bobby Willis: songwriter, husband and manager of Cilla Black
- Tony Willis: boxer, former British champion and won a bronze medal in the 1980 Summer Olympics
- Harold Wilson: prime minister of the United Kingdom, educated at Wirral Grammar School for Boys, member of Parliament for Huyton 1950 to 1983, a statue was erected in Huyton town centre in 2006
- Robb Wilton (1881–1957): comedian and actor
- Peter Withe: footballer, Aston Villa F.C. England international, scored the winning goal in the 1982 European Cup Final
- Gustav Wilhelm Wolff (1834–1913): Hamburg-born co-founder of Harland & Wolff, a shipbuilding company founded in 1861
- Sir Corbet Woodall (1841–1916): gas engineer, governor of the Gas Light and Coke Company, the first public supplier of gas
- Lord Woodbine (1929–2000): Trinidad-born musician, music promoter, first manager of the Beatles
- John Woodhouse: merchant, pioneer of mass production and commercialisation of Marsala wine in 1773
- Patricia Woodlock: artist and suffragette, served the longest prison sentence among suffragettes, attended the 1910 Black Friday march
- Max Woosnam: England international footballer, also won Wimbledon tennis doubles, and a gold medal in the 1920 Summer Olympics
- Eleanor Worthington-Cox: actress
- Richard Wright (1723–1775): painter
- Tommy Wright: footballer, Everton F.C. and England international
- Pete Wylie: singer-songwriter with the band the Mighty Wah!
- Arthur Wynne (1871–1945): inventor of the crossword puzzle

== X ==
- Michael Xavier: actor and singer

== Y ==
- Pauline Yates (1929–2015): actress
- Henry Yates Thompson (1838–1928): newspaper publisher
- David Yip: actor
- Mal Young: TV producer and executive who oversaw Brookside, EastEnders, The Bill and Doctor Who
- Ozzie Yue: actor, musician for Merseybeat group the Hideaways

== Z ==
- Anne Ziegler (1910–2003): singer

== See also ==
- List of bands and artists from Merseyside
