= David Morrissey filmography =

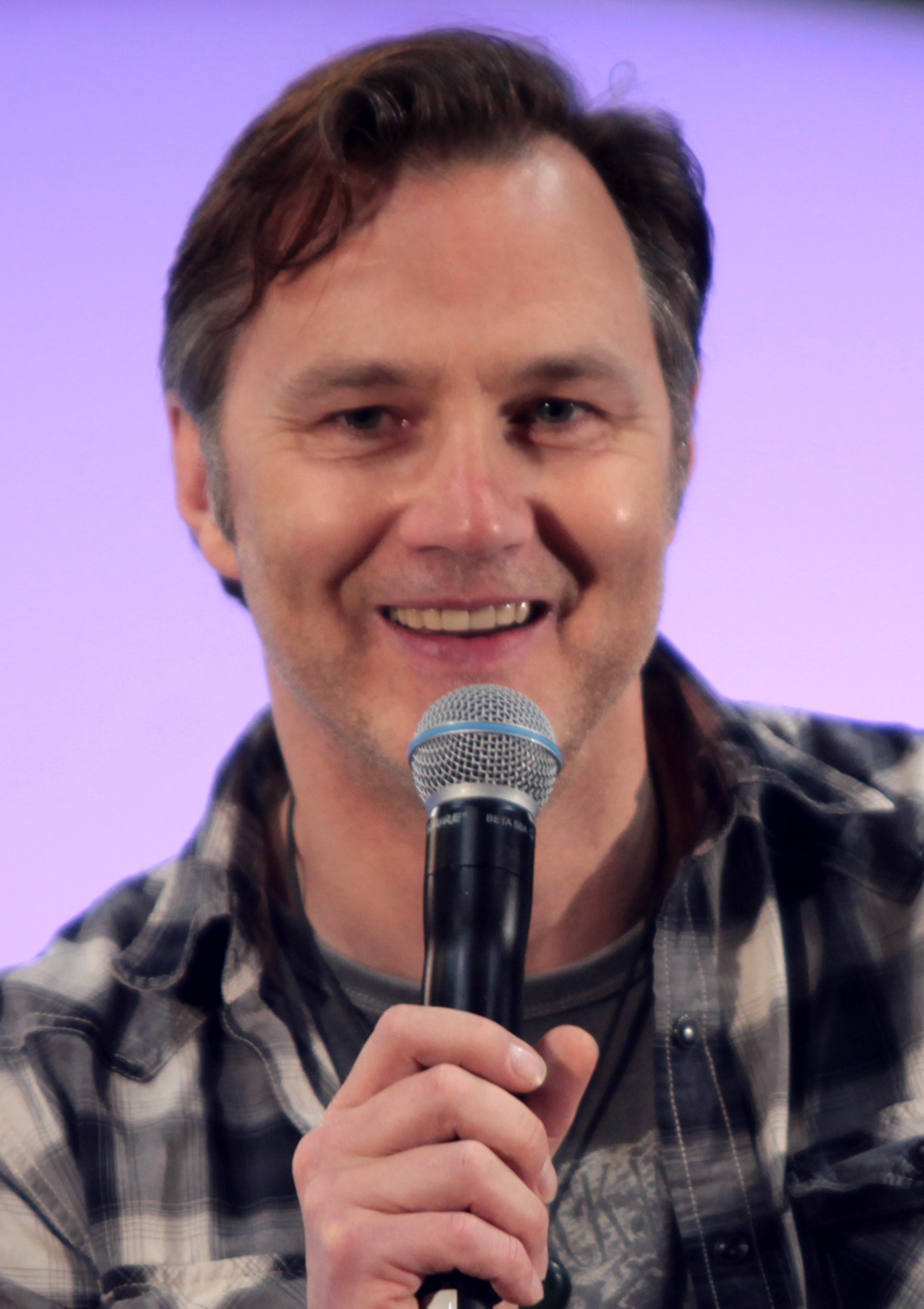
Morrissey in May 2015

The filmography of English actor David Morrissey encompasses acting, directing, producing, and screenwriting roles in film, television, and theatre for over 30 years.

Morrissey made his screen acting debut in 1983 as a main cast member in Willy Russell's One Summer. Since then he has appeared notably in The Knock (1994), Tony Marchant's Holding On (1997), Andrew Davies's Our Mutual Friend (1998), Paul Abbott's State of Play and Peter Morgan's The Deal (both 2003), Peter Bowker's Blackpool (2004), and Andrew Davies' Sense and Sensibility (2008). In 2010, he produced and starred in Thorne, a television adaptation of Mark Billingham's Tom Thorne novels for Sky 1. In film he has appeared in Hilary and Jackie (1998), Some Voices (2000), Derailed (2005), Basic Instinct 2 (2006), and The Reaping (2007).

On stage, after a period working with the Royal Shakespeare Company and the National, he appeared in Peer Gynt (1990), Much Ado About Nothing (1993), Three Days of Rain (1999), In a Dark Dark House (2008) and Hangmen (2015) by Martin McDonagh.

He was nominated for a British Academy Television Award for Best Actor for his role in State of Play, was nominated for a Royal Television Society Award for Best Male Actor for his role in Holding On, and won the RTS Award for his role in The Deal.

== Acting ==
=== Television ===
Key
†	Denotes television productions that have not yet been released

Year(s)	Title	Role	Notes
1983	One Summer	Billy Rizley	5-part television series
1987	Cause Célèbre	George Bowman	2-part television serial
1987	The Storyteller: Greek Myths	Theseus	1 episode of television series: "Theseus and the Minotaur"
1990-1992	ScreenPlay	Various	3 episodes
1990	The Widowmaker	Rob	Television film
1992	Framed	Sergeant Lawrence Jackson	4-part television serial
1993	Between the Lines	Inspector Dilke	2 episodes of television series: "Big Boys' Rules, Part 1"; "Big Boys' Rules, Part 2"
1994	The Knock	Gerry Birch	1 series of television series
1994	Finney	Finney	1 series of television series
1995	Devil's Advocate	Matthew Salt	Television film
1996	Into the Fire	Michael Ride	3-part television serial
1996	The One That Got Away	Sergeant Andy "Mac" McNab	Television film
1996	Shakespeare Shorts: Julius Caesar	Brutus	1 episode of television anthology
1996	Out of the Blue	DS Jim "Lew" Llewyn	1 series of television series
1997	Holding On	Shaun Southerns	8-part television serial
1998	Our Mutual Friend	Bradley Headstone	4-part television serial
1998	Screen One: Big Cat	Leo	Television film
1999	Fanny and Elvis	Rob Dickson	Television film
1999	Pure Wickedness	Frank Healy	4-part television serial
2001	Linda Green	Pete Jones	1 episode of television series: "Pete"
2002	Clocking Off	Franny Rothwell	1 episode of television series: "Franny's Story"
2002	Murder	Dave Dewston	4-part television serial
2002	Out of Control	Mike	Television film
2003	This Little Life	Richie MacGregor	Television film
2003	State of Play	Stephen Collins	6-part television serial
2003	The Deal	Gordon Brown	Television film
2004	Blackpool (Note: Entitled Viva Blackpool in the United States.)	Ripley Holden	6-part television serial
2006	Viva Blackpool (Note: Entitled Viva Blackpool: Ripley's Return in the United States.)	Ripley Holden	Television film
2007	Cape Wrath (Note: Entitled Meadowlands in the United States.)	Danny Brogan	1 series of television series
2008	Sense and Sensibility	Colonel Brandon	3-part television serial
2008	Doctor Who	Jackson Lake	TV series; episode: "The Next Doctor"
2009	Red Riding	Maurice Jobson	3-part television serial
2009	U Be Dead	Dr. Jan Falkowski	Television film (Note: First broadcast in New Zealand.)
2010	Mrs Mandela	Major Theunis Swanepoel	Television film
2010	Five Days	DI Mal Craig	4 episodes of 5-part television serial
2010	Agatha Christie's Poirot	Colonel John Arbuthnot	1 episode of television series: "Murder on the Orient Express" (Note: First broadcast in the United States.)
2010	Thorne	DI Tom Thorne	1 series of television series
2011	South Riding	Robert Carne	3-part television serial
2011	London's Burning	Borough Commander Campbell	Television film
2011–2013	The Field of Blood	Murray Devlin	2 series of television series
2012	Richard II	Northumberland	Television film
2012	True Love	Adrian	1 episode of television series: Story Five
2012–2015	The Walking Dead	Philip Blake / The Governor	Main cast; 19 episodes Starring (seasons 3-4), Guest (season 5)
2014	The 7.39	Carl Matthews	2-part television serial
2014	The Driver	Vince McKee	TV series
2015	Extant	General Tobias Shepherd	11 episodes
2016	The Missing	Captain Sam Webster	8 episodes
2017	The League of Gentlemen	Gareth Chapman	1 episode of television series: Anniversary Specials, "Royston Vasey Mon Amour"
2018–2021	Britannia	Aulus Plautius	18 episodes
2018	The City & the City	Tyador Borlú	4 episodes
2019	Good Omens	Captain Vincent	1 episode of TV series
2020	Inside No. 9	Martin	1 episode of television series: "The Referee's A W***er"
2020	The Singapore Grip	Walter Blackett	TV series
2022–present	Sherwood	Detective Chief Superintendent Ian St Clair	TV series
2023	The Great Stand Up to Cancer Bake Off	Himself / Contestant	Star Baker
2023	The Long Shadow	DCS George Oldfield	Main cast
2024–present	Daddy Issues	Malcolm	Main role
2025	Prime Target	Professor Robert Mallinder	Main role
2026	Gone	Michael Polly	Main cast; Six-part drama
2026	Tip Toe	Clive Goss	Main Role
TBA	The Siege †	TBA	Main cast; Upcoming six-part drama

=== Film ===
Key
†	Denotes films that have not yet been released

Year	Title	Role	Notes
1988	Drowning by Numbers	Bellamy	Feature film
1988	Out of Town	Traveller	Short film
1991	Robin Hood	Little John	Feature film
1992	Waterland	Dick Crick	Feature film
1993	Under	Cast member	Short film
1993	Being Human	Cyprian's Man	Feature film
1998	The Commissioner	Murray Lomax	Feature film
1998	Hilary and Jackie	Kiffer Finzi	Feature film
2000	The Suicide Club	Henry Joyce	Feature film
2000	Some Voices	Pete	Feature film
2000	Born Romantic	Fergus Greer	Feature film
2001	Captain Corelli's Mandolin	Captain Gunther Weber	Feature film
2002	Spyhole	Bill Miller	Feature film
2003	Butterfly World	Father	Short film
2003	Girl with a Pearl Earring	Van Leeuwenhoek	Feature film – Scenes deleted
2005	Stoned	Tom Keylock	Feature film
2005	Derailed	Sam Griffin	Feature film
2006	Basic Instinct 2	Michael Glass	Feature film
2007	The Reaping	Doug Blackwell	Feature film
2007	The Water Horse: Legend of the Deep	Captain Hamilton	Feature film
2008	The Other Boleyn Girl	Thomas Howard, Duke of Norfolk	Feature film
2009	Is Anybody There?	Dad	Feature film
2009	Don't Worry About Me	Commentator	Feature film – Uncredited (Note: Morrissey had no intention of making an appearance in the film during production, but during post-production he looped his own voice for the dog race commentary as no one else was available.)
2009	Nowhere Boy	Bobby Dykins	Feature film
2010	Centurion	Bothos	Feature film
2010	Cooked	Dan (Lobster) (voice)	Short film
2011	Gee Gee	Michael	Short film
2011	Blitz	Harold Dunlop	Feature film
2012	Earthbound	Bill	Feature film
2013	Welcome to the Punch	Geiger	Feature film
2015	The Ones Below	Jon	Feature film
2021	The Colour Room	Fred Ridgeway	Feature film
2022	Dampyr	Gorka	Feature film
2024	Slingshot	Napier	Feature film
2025	The Woman in Cabin 10	Thomas Heatherley	Feature film
2028	The Beatles – A Four-Film Cinematic Event †	Jim McCartney	Filming

=== Stage ===
Year	Title	Role	Director	Notes
1986	WCPC	PC Simon	Pam Brighton	Liverpool Playhouse. February 1986.
1986	Jug	Matt Bradbury	Philip Hedley	Theatre Royal, Stratford East. 3 June–5 July 1986.
1986	Le Cid		Declan Donnellan	National tour/Cheek by Jowl
1987	Twelfth Night	Sebastian	Declan Donnellan	Donmar Warehouse/Cheek by Jowl
1987	Ghetto	Giorgio	Julia Pascal	Hammersmith Riverside Studios. March–5 April 1987.
1987–1988	The Cabinet Minister	Valentine White	Braham Murray	Royal Exchange Theatre, Manchester. 17 December 1987 – 30 January 1988.
1988	King John	Bastard	Deborah Warner	The Other Place/RSC. May–June 1988.
1988	Henry VI, Parts 1, 2 and 3	Vernon	Adrian Noble	Royal Shakespeare Theatre/RSC. 29 September 1988.
1988	Edward IV	Duke of Clarence	Adrian Noble	Royal Shakespeare Theatre/RSC. 6 October 1988.
1988	Richard III	Duke of Clarence	Adrian Noble	Royal Shakespeare Theatre/RSC. 13 October 1988.
1988	The Plantagenets (Note: Marathon performance of Henry VI (reduced) and Richard III.)	Vernon/Duke of Clarence	Adrian Noble	Royal Shakespeare Theatre/RSC. 22 October 1988.
1989	Richard III	Duke of Clarence	Deborah Warner	Barbican Centre/RSC. April–May 1989.
1989	King John	Bastard	Deborah Warner	The Pit/RSC. April–June 1989.
1990	Peer Gynt	Peer Gynt	Declan Donnellan	Olivier (National). 28 February–March 1990.
1990	The School for Scandal		Peter Wood	Olivier (National). 24 April–May 1990.
1993	Much Ado About Nothing	Claudio	Matthew Warchus	Queen's Theatre. 6 July 1993 for 12 weeks.
1999–2000	Three Days of Rain	Pip/Theo	Robin LeFevre	Donmar Warehouse. 1–13 March 1999, 16 November 1999 – 22 January 2000
2008–2009	In a Dark Dark House	Terry	Michael Attenborough	Almeida Theatre. 27 November 2008 – 17 January 2009.
2011	Macbeth	Macbeth	Gemma Bodinetz	Everyman Theatre. 6 May–11 June 2011.
2015–2016	Hangmen	Hary Wade	Matthew Dunster	Royal Court Theatre 10 Sep–10 Oct 2015 and Wyndhams Theatre 1 December 2015 – 5 March 2016.
2018	Julius Caesar	Mark Antony	Nicholas Hytner	Bridge Theatre
2026	The Oresteia	Christopher	Simon Stone	Bridge Theatre

=== Radio ===
Year	Title	Role	Radio station
2000	As You Like It	Orlando	BBC Radio 3, broadcast on 23 April 2000
2001	The Trials and Tribulations of Armitage Shanks	Armitage Shanks	BBC Radio 4, Afternoon Play, broadcast on 31 January 2001
2002	Small Earthquake	Mike	BBC Radio 4, Friday Play, broadcast on 3 May 2002
2002	Wild Things!	Robert	BBC Radio 4, broadcast 19 August–9 September 2002
2004	Shut Eye	Billy Rucker	BBC Radio 4, broadcast 9–30 March 2004
2005	Hold Back the Night	Billy Rucker	BBC Radio 4, broadcast 22 November–13 December 2005
2009	Becket	Becket	BBC Radio 3, broadcast 4 October 2009

=== Narration ===
Year	Title	Notes
2004	Zero Hour	4 episodes of television series: "Columbine"; "9/11"; "Disaster at Chernobyl"; "Terror in Tokyo"
2004	Britain's Boy Soldiers	Television documentary
2004	Who Do You Think You Are?	1 series of television series, 2004
2004	The Boy That Michael Jackson Paid Off	Television documentary
2005–2007	Skint	2 series of television series, 2005–2007
2007	Taking Liberties	Film documentary
2008–2010	Seaside Rescue	Television documentary series
2009	Catching Britain's Biggest Thieves	Television documentary
2009	Born to Be Different	2 episodes of television series: "Turning Eight"; "Turning Nine"
2009	Coastline Cops	Television documentary series
2010	Hannah: The Girl Who Said No to a New Heart	Television documentary
2010	Icarus at the Edge of Time	Live concert
2011	Agony & Ecstasy	3-part television documentary
2011	Around the World in 60 Minutes	Television documentary
2011	Lord Sugar Tackles Football	Television documentary
2011	The Corrie Years	3-part television documentary
2013	"Autobiography" written by Morrissey	Audiobook narration
2023	Turkey: Empire of Erdogan	2-part television documentary

== Filmmaking ==
Year(s)	Title	Role	Notes
1996	Something for the Weekend	Writer and producer	Short film
1998	A Secret Audience	Director	Short film
2000	Bring Me Your Love	Director and writer	Short film
2001	Sweet Revenge	Director	2-part television film
2004	Passer By	Director	2-part television film
2009	Don't Worry About Me	Director and co-writer	Feature film
2010	CAST in Beirut	Director	Documentary short (Note: Screened at the 2010 Greenbelt festival.)
2010	Thorne	Executive producer	1 series of television series
2024–	Daddy Issues	Executive producer	Television series
