= Rupert de Larrinaga =

British alpine skier

Colonel Rupert Ashworth Ramon de Larrinaga (born 19 November 1928) in Liverpool, the de Larrinaga family hailed from the Basque provinces of Vizcaya (province) before moving to Liverpool in 1863 and forming Larrinaga Shipping Company, sailing out of Liverpool, their ships traded with Spanish colonies and the United States, Rupert who served as a lieutenant-colonel in the Army in the years shortly after World War II . As a colonel in the British Army, de Larrinaga served in the occupation of Germany, eventually rising to command King's Regiment (Liverpool). He was also a director of the family-run Larrinaga Steamship Company Ltd., two ships in the Larrinaga fleet bore the name of Rupert de Larrinaga, the first built in 1930 was torpedoed during World War II one of the company’s ships the Buena Venture was the first steamer under Spanish flag to pass through the Suez Canal, Rupert went on to be skier who competed in the 1952 Winter Olympics in the Giant slalom and was honoured in the Isle of Man with a portrait stamp in 1994 in celebration of the centenary of the International Olympic Committee.

Larrinaga family owned the Larrinaga Palace

Felix Ramon Larrinaga’s family tomb is at Anfield Cemetery Liverpool.
