= William Harrison (sea captain) =

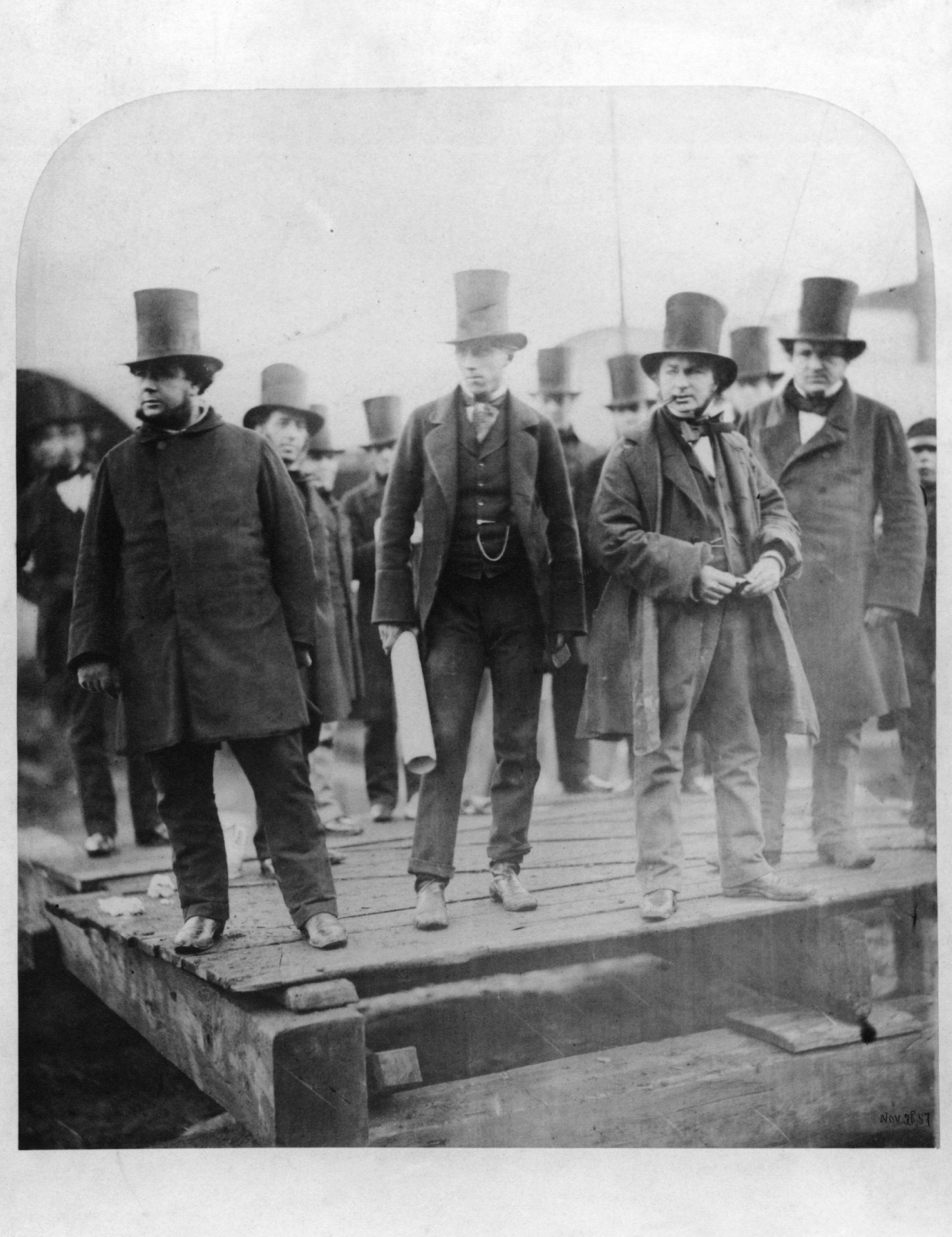
William Harrison, Isambard Kingdom Brunel, and others before the launch of the SS Great Eastern, 1857

William Harrison (October 1812 in Maryport, Cumberland – 21 January 1860) was a British merchant navy officer. He was the son of a master in the merchant navy.

== Early career ==
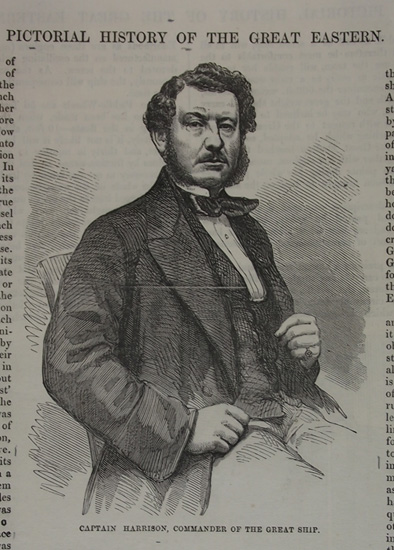
Print of Captain Harrison, in the collection of The Mariners' Museum

Harrison was bound an apprentice to Mr. Porter, a shipowner of Liverpool, and went to sea in October 1825. On the expiration of his articles, he obtained the command of a vessel, and served in the East and West Indies, and on the coast of South America. In the course of the numerous disagreements among the rival powers on the American coast, he was more than once in action, and acquitted himself with credit. In 1834, he transferred his services to Barton, Erlam, & Higgonson, and for them took charge of vessels on the Barbadoes line.

From 1842 to 31 December 1855, he was connected with the Cunard Line of packets trading between Liverpool and America. During that period, he crossed the Atlantic upwards of one hundred and eighty times, and was one of the most popular of the commanders on that route.

== The Great Eastern ==
In January 1856, he was selected by the directors of the Eastern Steam Navigation Company out of two hundred competitors to take the command of the Great Leviathan, then building at Millwall in the Thames. In the following years he was appointed to superintend the arrangements for internal accommodation and navigation. The ship being at last completed after great delay, and renamed the SS Great Eastern, was sent on a trial trip from Deptford to Portland Roads. Off Hastings on 9 September 1859, a terrific explosion of steam killed ten of the firemen and seriously injured several other persons. Harrison showed prompt courage and resource, and brought the vessel into Portland, although in a very damaged state. The Great Eastern was then put into winter quarters near Hurst Castle.

On 21 January 1860, her commander, while sailing from Hythe to Southampton in the ship's boat, was capsized during a squall near the Southampton dock gates, and when taken from the water was found to be dead. He was buried in St. James's cemetery, Liverpool on 27 January, when upwards of thirty thousand people followed his body to the grave. Some time previously he had become surety for a friend, by whose sudden death all his savings were lost. A sum of money was therefore raised for the benefit of his aged mother, wife and three children.
