= Lawrence Anderson Ellerbeck =

New Zealand photographer (1874–1963)

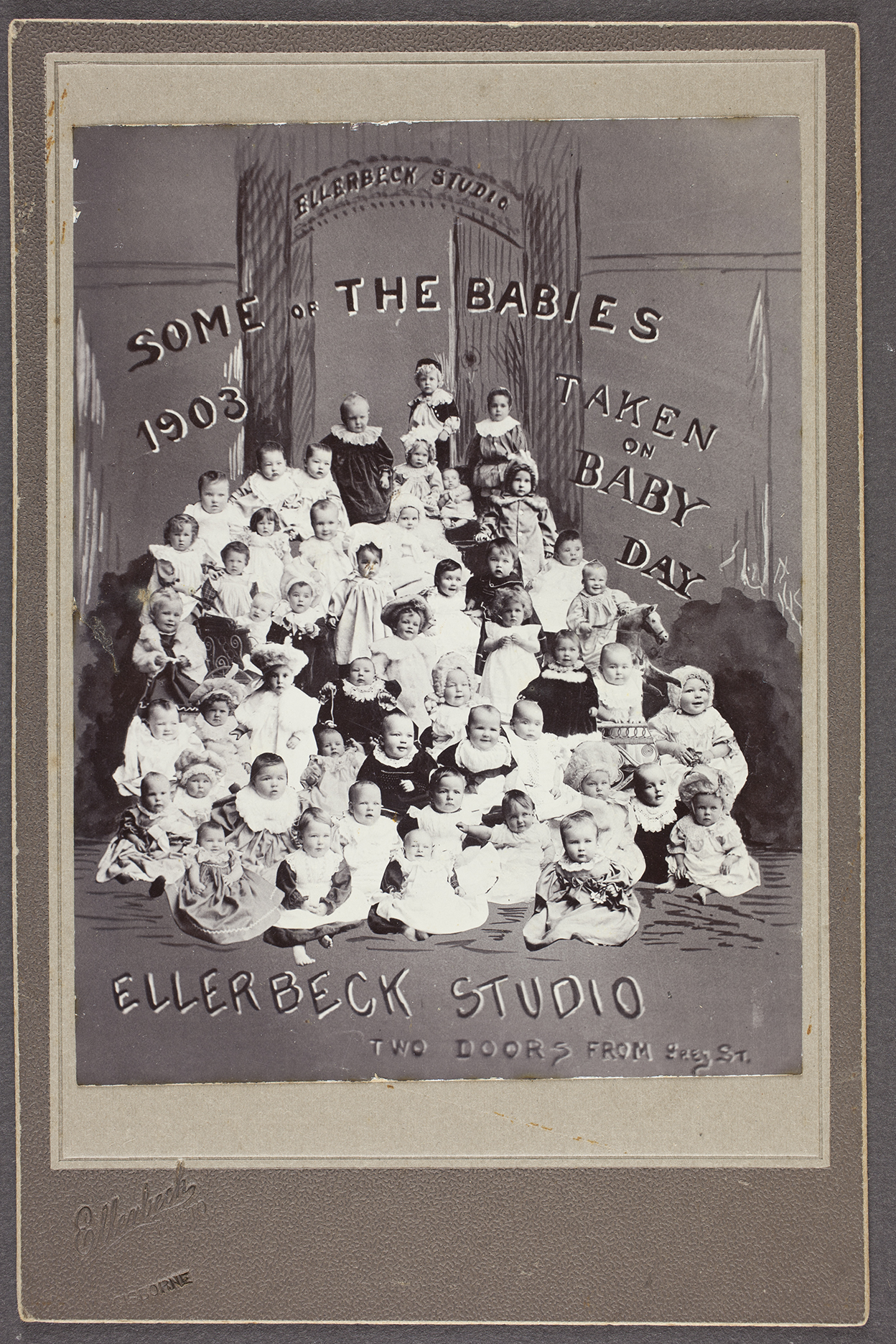
Composite image created by Ellerbeck Studio

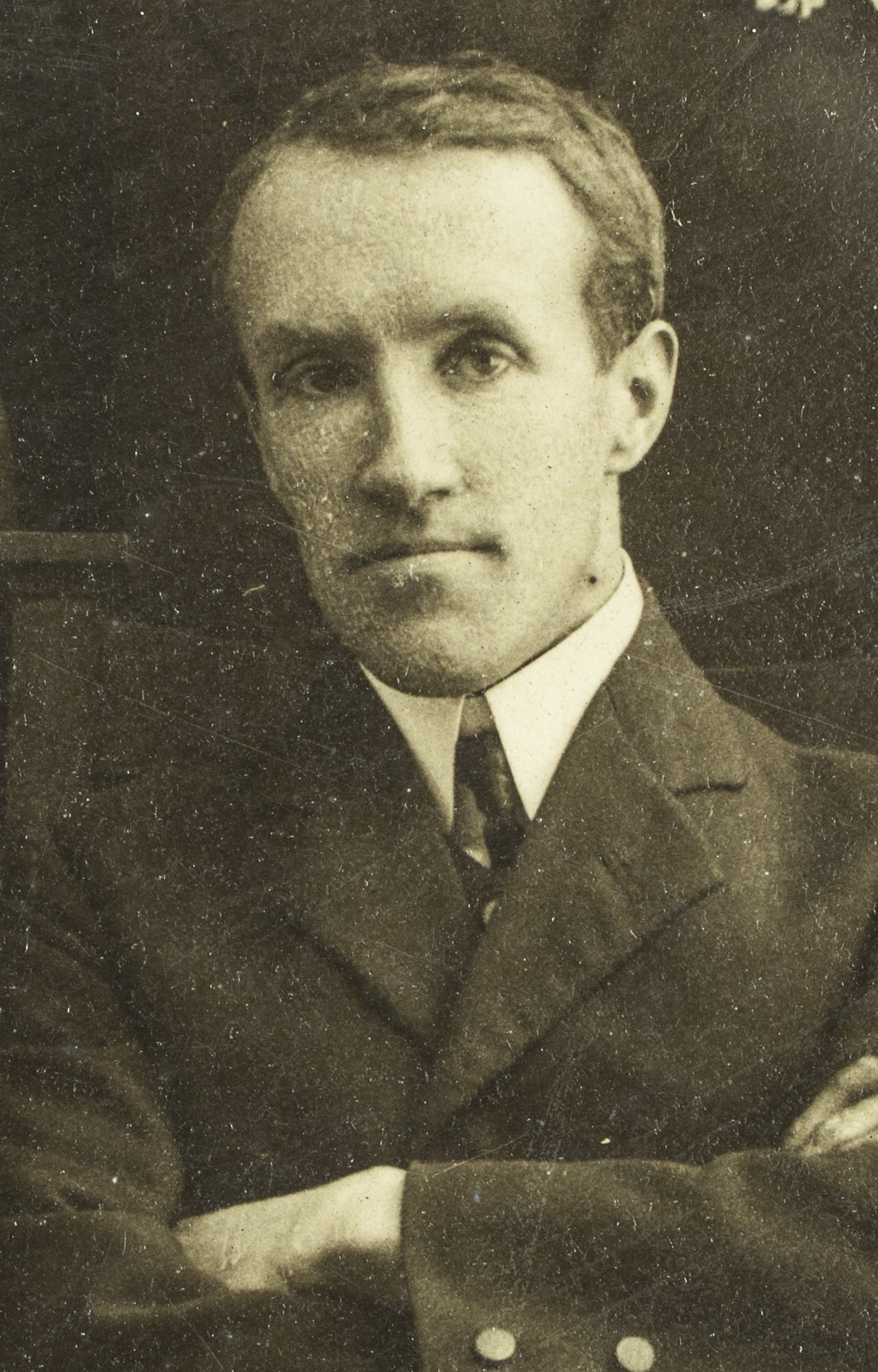
L A Ellerbeck, taken from a group photograph of the Alhambra Club, 1907

Lawrence Anderson Ellerbeck (1874 – 28 May 1963) was a New Zealand photographer. He ran Ellerbeck Studios in Gisborne between 1902 and 1925. He became a renowned photographer during this time, photographing in his studio many of the district's inhabitants. Examples of his work are held by the Tairāwhiti Museum.

== Biography ==
Ellerbeck was born in 1874 in Liverpool, England. He became a professional photographer, practising in New Zealand.

Ellerbeck followed in the footsteps of his father, John Henry Townsend Ellerbeck, and brothers Harry Syers Ellerbeck and Charles Joseph Ellerbeck, all of whom were photographers.

Ellerbeck followed his brother Charles to New Zealand in 1896. His first establishment was in Kūaotunu, Coromandel.

He worked as an assistant to the Gisborne photographer J Innes before acquiring the business of J Robb. He later purchased the business of Innes. Ellerbeck set up a photographic studio in Gisborne in 1902, advertising that he had wide experience as a photographer in England, America and Australia.

During his time in Gisborne, he established an annual "Baby Day", when babies aged between 6 and 18 months were given free sittings.

In 1925, Ellerbeck left Gisborne for Wellington, selling his business to Elsworthy T Doddrell.

Ellerbeck died on 28 May 1963 at Porirua Hospital and is buried at the Karori Cemetery.
