= Ivan Thompson =

British naval officer

Sir Cyril Ivan Thompson (1894–1970), usually known as Sir Ivan Thompson, was a British sea captain who was Commodore of the Cunard Steamship Company from 1954 to 1957.

== Career ==
Thompson was born on 1 November 1894 near Liverpool, where he was educated. He joined Joseph Chadwick and Son's Drum line in 1910. The following year, he moved to work for the Harrison Line, before joining Cunard in 1916 as a third officer. During the First World War, he was serving on the RMS Caronia (then requisitioned for war service) and witnessed the next ship in the convoy suffer a torpedo attack. He also remained at sea during the Second World War and witnessed a torpedo attack on another ship in his convoy.

In 1942, Thompson was appointed a staff captain and served on the RMS Queen Mary, RMS Aquitania, and RMS Queen Elizabeth before he was promoted to take command of the MV Georgic in 1945. He subsequently commanded RMS Mauretania, the Caronia, Queen Mary, RMS Franconia, MV Britannic and the Queen Elizabeth. Between 1954 and 1957, he was Commodore of the Cunard Line and was knighted in the 1955 Birthday Honours.

Retiring in 1957, Thompson died at Liverpool after a long illness on 22 July 1970. He was survived by a widow, Eileen Smallwood, and four children.
