= Leonard Owen =

Sir Leonard Owen CBE
- Born: William Leonard Owen; 3 May 1897; Walton, Liverpool, England
- Died: 25 March 1971 (aged 73); Beaumaris, Anglesey, Wales
- Known for: Calder Hall
- Awards: Knight Bachelor (1957)
- Scientific career
- Fields: Civil engineering Nuclear engineering

Sir William Leonard Owen CBE (3 May 1897 – 25 March 1971) was a British civil engineer and nuclear engineer. As Director of Engineering at the British Atomic Energy Project, he oversaw the construction of the Springfields Chemical and Fuel Element Plants, the Windscale Piles, Windscale plutonium extraction plant, Capenhurst gaseous diffusion plant and the Calder Hall nuclear power station.

== Biography ==
Owen was born in 1897 in Walton, Liverpool, England, the only child of Thomas John Owen, a mariner, and his wife, Levina Elizabeth Victoria Isabella Smith. He was educated at Liverpool Collegiate School. The First World War broke out while he was there, and he joined the 6th Liverpool Regiment, and served on the Western Front.

After the war he entered the University of Liverpool, where he studied engineering. He was awarded his Bachelor of Engineering degree with honours in 1922, and a Master of Engineering degree in 1924. He married Phyllis Condliff in 1923; they had two children, both sons.

Owen took a position with the Brunner Mond Company in Northwich in 1922, and became a project engineer at one of its chemical plants. The plant was involved in the large-scale production of bulk chemicals, and his engineering department was concerned with the design of additions to the plant. In 1926, Brunner Mond merged with other firms to form Imperial Chemical Industries (ICI). He began working with Christopher Hinton in 1929, and the two would be colleagues for the next 30 years, although they never became friends.

In the years immediately prior to the outbreak of the Second World War in 1939, Hinton and Owen were involved in the British shadow factories scheme, under which new factories were established so British industry, particularly the aircraft industry, could rapidly expand on the outbreak of war. After the war began, Hinton and Owen were seconded to the Ministry of Supply, with Owen serving under Hinton as a director of the Royal Filling Factories. In this role he was responsible for their plant and equipment.

After the war ended, Owen joined Hinton at ROF Risley, near Warrington, as Director of Engineering in the Atomic Energy Department at the Ministry of Supply, working on the British Atomic Energy Project. In 1947, he became Hinton's deputy as Assistant Controller in Department of Atomic Energy Production. As such, he oversaw the construction of its facilities, including the Springfields Chemical and Fuel Element Plants, the Windscale Piles, Windscale plutonium extraction plant, Capenhurst gaseous diffusion plant and the Calder Hall nuclear power station, the world's first nuclear power station to produce electricity on a commercial scale. For his services, Owen was made a Commander of the Order of the British Empire in June 1950.

With the establishment of the United Kingdom Atomic Energy Authority (UKAEA) in 1954, Owen became the Director of Engineering and Deputy Managing Director of its Industrial Group. When Hinton moved on to become the chairman of the Central Electricity Generating Board in 1957, Owen became the managing director. He became the UKAEA Member for Production in 1959, and Member for Production and for Engineering in 1961. He served in this role until he retired from executive duties in 1962, but remained as a part-time member of the UKAEA until 1964. He was made a Knight Bachelor in 1957, and awarded an honorary Doctor of Science degree by the University of Manchester in 1960.

After leaving the UKAEA, Owen became a Director of United Gas Industries, and was chairman of three of its subsidiaries. He was also a Director of Cammell Laird, a shipbuilding company that built nuclear-powered submarines, including the Polaris ballistic missile submarines HMS Renown and HMS Revenge, and HMS Conqueror, which sank the cruiser General Belgrano in the Falklands War. He was on the Council of the University of Liverpool, and was chairman of the committee responsible building the new Mechanical Engineering Building and the Oliver Lodge Laboratory. He was chairman of the British Nuclear Energy Society and a member of the Institution of Civil Engineers, serving on its Publications Committee and its General Purposes Committee. Owen died at his home, in Beaumaris, Anglesey, in north Wales on 25 March 1971. His papers are in the University of Liverpool.
