= Ross Cohen (director) =

British film director and producer

- Born: Liverpool, England
- Occupations: producer, director, screenwriter
- Years active: 2008–present
- Website: rosscohen.com

Ross Cohen is a British film director and producer based in Los Angeles, California.

== Biography ==
Cohen was born and raised in Liverpool, England and moved to Los Angeles to attend the graduate film program at the University of Southern California. Cohen was awarded an Alfred P. Sloan Production Award to make his graduate thesis short film Willowbrook, a film that premiered as official selection at the 2012 Tribeca Film Festival, where it was nominated for the Student Visionary Award and went on to win Best Short Film at the 2012 Boston Film Festival.

In March 2013, during the premiere week of the successful Netflix series House of Cards and the Papal Elections at the Vatican, Cohen directed the viral parody trailer House of Cardinals. The project was praised by cast members, Kevin Spacey and by showrunner Beau Willimon, who invited Cohen, along with his co-creator Jonathan Deutsch, to visit the House of Cards set during the filming of season two.

In late 2013, Cohen directed a commercial spot for Porsche titled Fire and Ice that played online and in Laemmle, Landmark and Angelika theater chains throughout Winter 2013 and Spring 2014.
