= Ibercaja Banco =

Ibercaja Banco, S.A.

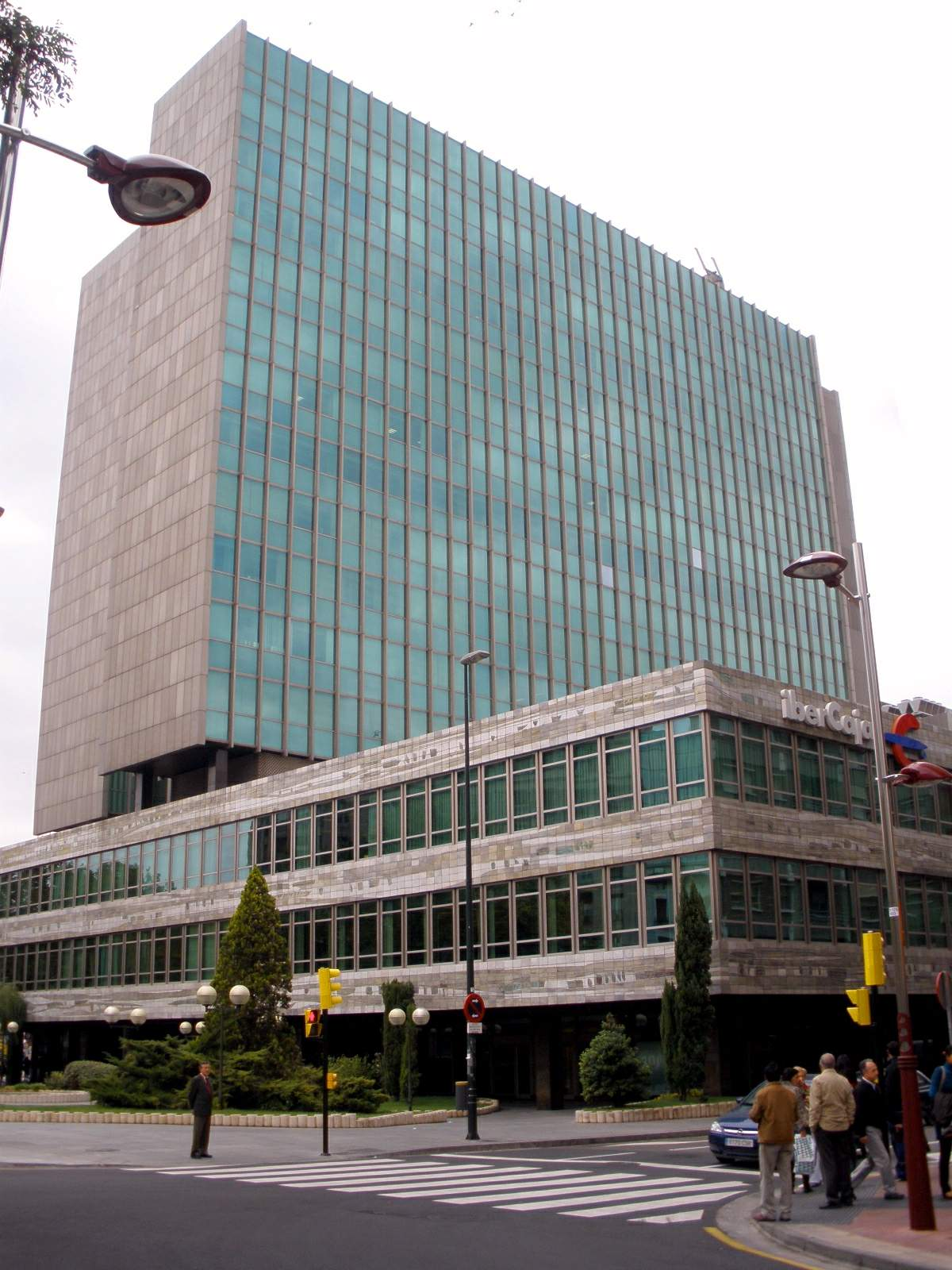
- Main headquarters in Zaragoza
- Type: Sociedad Anonima
- Industry: financial sector
- Founded: 1 October 2011
- Headquarters: Zaragoza, Spain
- Key people: Francisco Serrano Gill de Albornoz (Chairman); Víctor Iglesias Ruiz (CEO)
- Products: Financial services
- Revenue: ▼€695.583 million (2017)
- Net income: ▼€138.4 million (2017)
- Total assets: €56.440 billion (Q1 2026)
- Owner: Fundación Ibercaja (88%)
- Number of employees: ▼5,581 (2017)
- Website: www.ibercaja.es

Ibercaja Banco, S.A., known simply as Ibercaja, is a Spanish financial services company based in Zaragoza. It was created in 2011 by the savings bank Caja de Ahorros y Monte de Piedad de Zaragoza, Aragón y Rioja (Ibercaja) to carry out its financial activity, initially holding 100% of the bank's shares. Following the acquisition of Caja3 by Ibercaja Banco during the restructuring of the Spanish banking sector, 87.8% of the entity was owned by Ibercaja and 12.2% by Caja3's three founding savings banks (Caja de Badajoz, Caja Inmaculada, and Caja Círculo). Following their subsequent conversion into foundations, the bank's share capital is held by Fundación Ibercaja (88.04%), Fundación Caja Inmaculada (4.73%), Fundación CB (3.90%), and Fundación Círculo Burgos (3.33%).

Together with the General Deputation of Aragon, owns the company Montañas de Aragón which controls the ski resort Aramón.

Ibercaja has been designated as a Significant Institution since the entry into force of European Banking Supervision in late 2014, and as a consequence is directly supervised by the European Central Bank.

== See also ==
- List of banks in the euro area
- List of banks in Spain
