= Larrinaga Palace =

20th-century building in Zaragoza, Spain

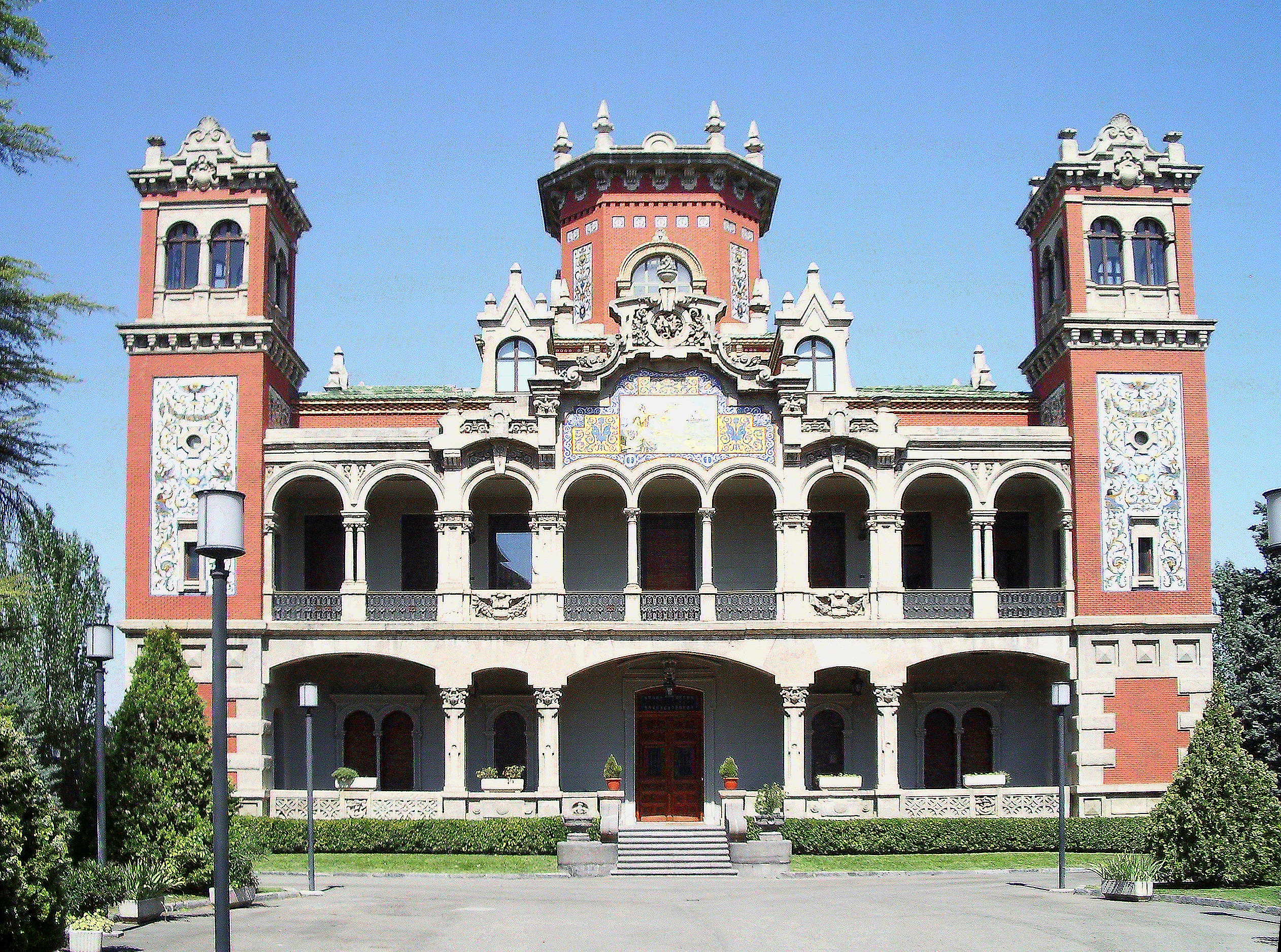
- Larrinaga Palace in 2007
- Interactive map of the Larrinaga Palace area

General information
- Status: Completed
- Architectural style: Neo-Renaissance
- Location: Zaragoza, Aragon, Spain, 123 Miguel Servet Avenue, Zaragoza, Spain, 50013
- Coordinates: 41°38′18″N 0°51′52″W
- Construction started: 1901
- Completed: 1911
- Owner: Ibercaja Banco

Height
- Height: 45 feet

Technical details
- Floor count: 3
- Grounds: 24.7 acres

Design and construction
- Architect: Félix Navarro Pérez

Website
- https://www.fundacionibercaja.es/centros/ibercaja-palacio-larrinaga/

The Larrinaga Palace is an early 20th-century palace located in Zaragoza, Aragon.

== Description ==
The building has a maritime motif, with such decorations as a seaport landscape and a heraldic coat of arms, as Larrinaga and his family were sea traders, with Miguel's father (who died in 1888, was the founder of Basque shipping company Olano, Larrinaga & Compañía). The materials used to construct the building were Aragonese stone, brick, and ceramic.

The palace is surrounded by a large garden enclosed by an iron gate. The central square is arranged around a courtyard, which is inspired by Aragonese Renaissance palaces. It is enclosed by a dome that accentuates its centralized character. The building has 3 floors.

== History ==
The palace was a commission by the renowned Aragonese architect Félix Navarro Pérez, who erected the building between 1901 and 1911. The palace was built in the old Montemolín district of Zaragoza.

The basement of the building was used as a shelter during the Spanish Civil War

It was completed in 1908, but was never inhabited as intended for the couple, Miguel Larrinaga y Luzárraga and Asunción Clavero. The couple lived in Liverpool, and had two vacation homes in San Sebastián and Málaga. It was intended for them to retire to the palace, but Clavero passed in 1939, with the palace being put up for sale in 1942. The Giesa elevator company bought the palace and its plot, building a factory adjacent to the former residence. The plot was quickly put up for sale afterwards, being bought out by the Society of Mary, who used the palace as a school. Ibercaja Bank purchased and restored the building in 1993. The building is currently used as a documentation center for storing historical information.

Zaragozan architectural historian, Jesús Martínez Verón, wrote that Larrinaga palace was "The best example of Zaragozaz eclecticism between 1885 and 1920. It is one of the best bourgeois residences erected in Aragon in terms of size and quality of execution.

== Family ==
Ramón de Larrinaga and his wife Telesfora de Luzárraga, who were double third cousins, had six children: Félix (the eldest, who lived with Larrinaga in Liverpool), Cruz, Anselma, María, Miguel (who bought the land and ordered the construction of the palace) and Domingo. When both Ramón and Telesfora died, the latter four children were minors and were left under the guardianship of several of their uncles (Miguel Antonio de Luzárraga and José de Larrinaga).

When Miguel was 15 years old, he studied law in order to take over his father's company. He traveled to Zaragoza to do so, and at the Basilica del Pilar, he met Clavero, a native of Albalate del Arzobispo, who he would later betroth, during the Fiestas del Pilar.

After Miguel's studies, he traveled to Liverpool and married Clavero. In 1898, he took over Olano, which was renamed Miguel de Larrinaga Steamship Co. Ltd. In 1900, Miguel traveled back to Zaragoza and acquired a piece of land for the purpose of settlement, which he titled "Villa Asunción". After the Civil War and upon the death of Clavero in 1939, Miguel sold the land to Giesa.

== Current usage ==
At the present time, the Larrinaga Palace is open to scheduled visits from groups of tourists and schoolchildren. Parts of the building are also used as rentable venue.

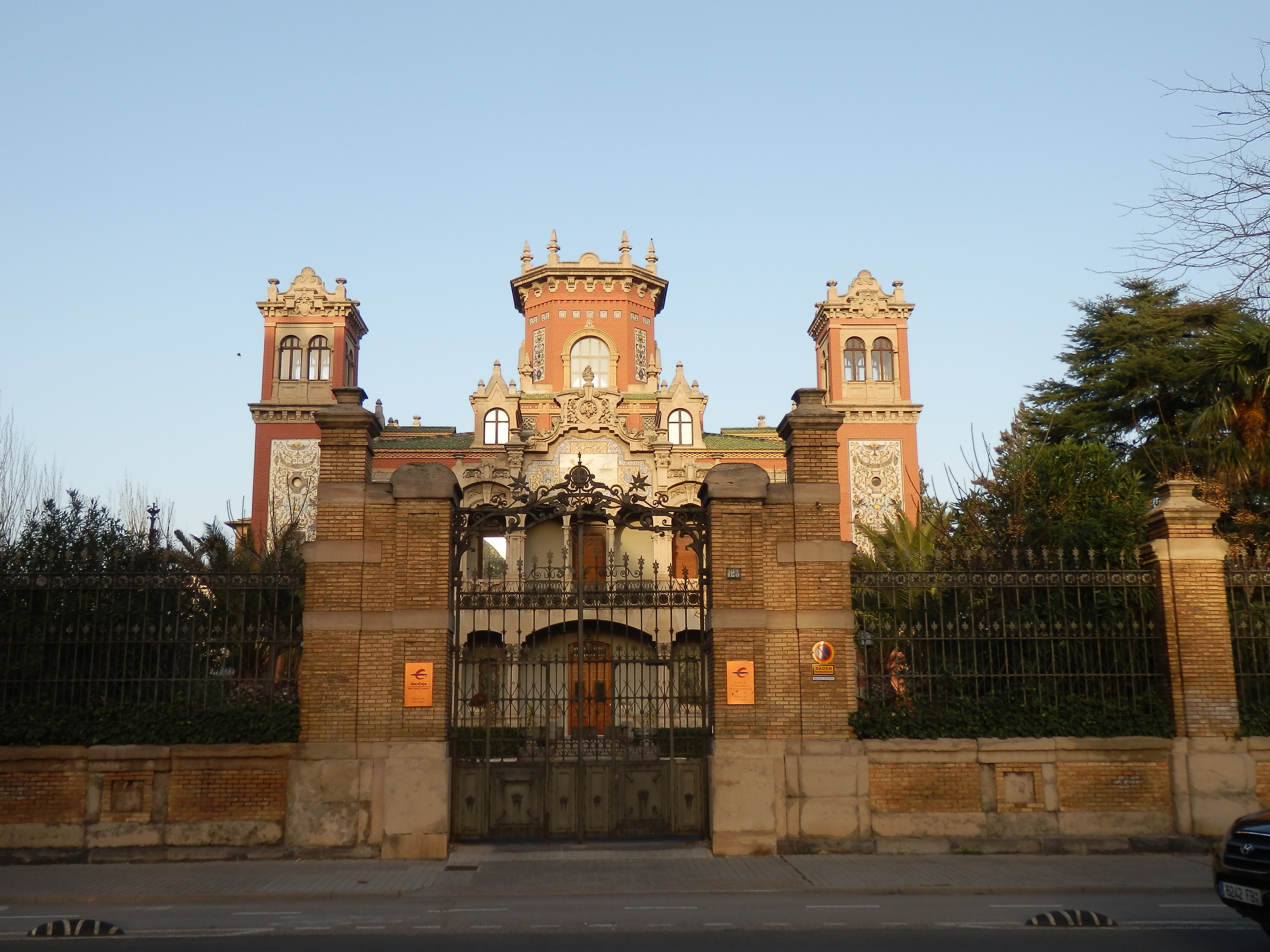
Larrinaga Palace behind the gates

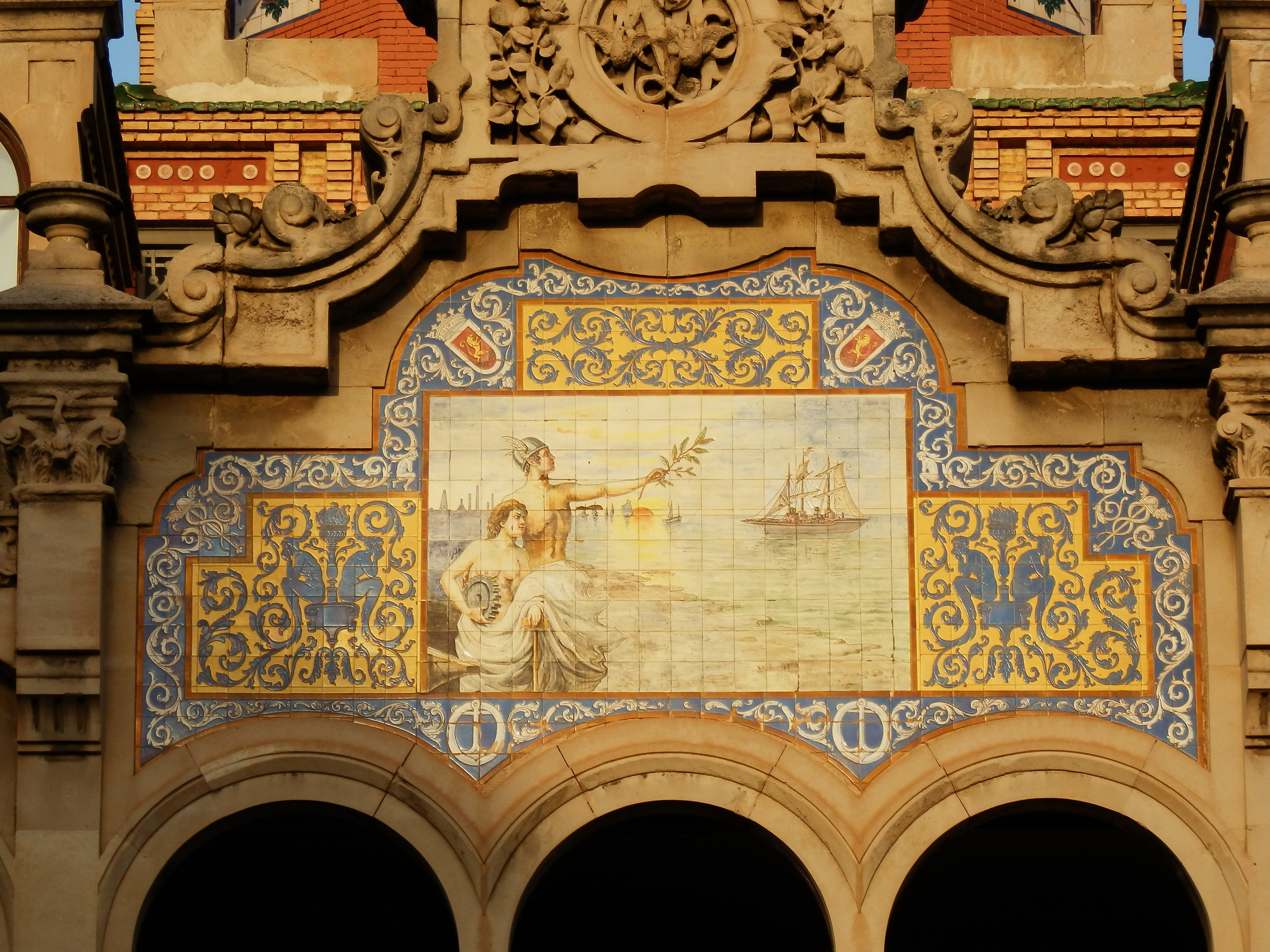
Seavoyaging embellishment

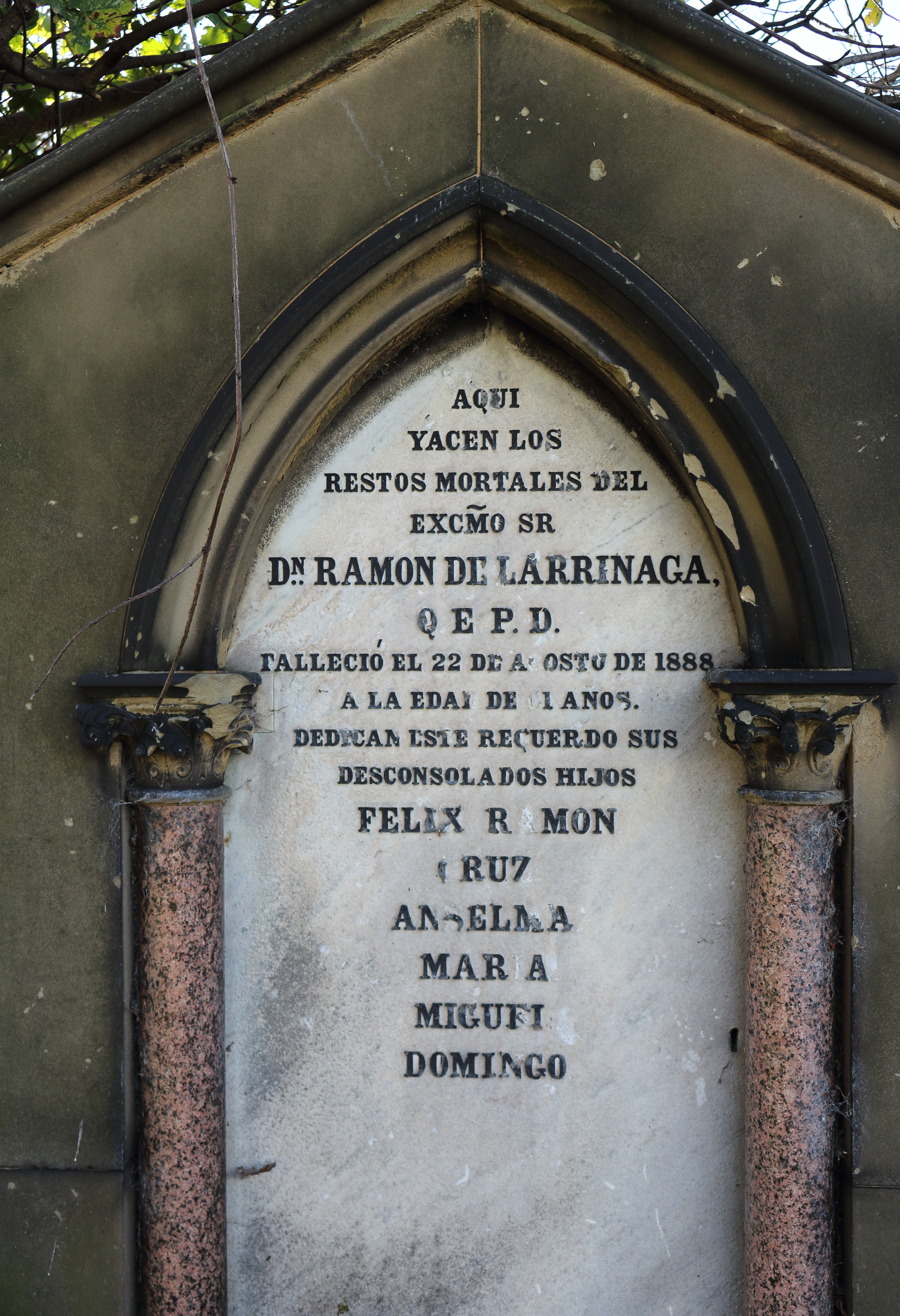
Felix Ramon Larrinaga's tomb, Anfield Cemetery

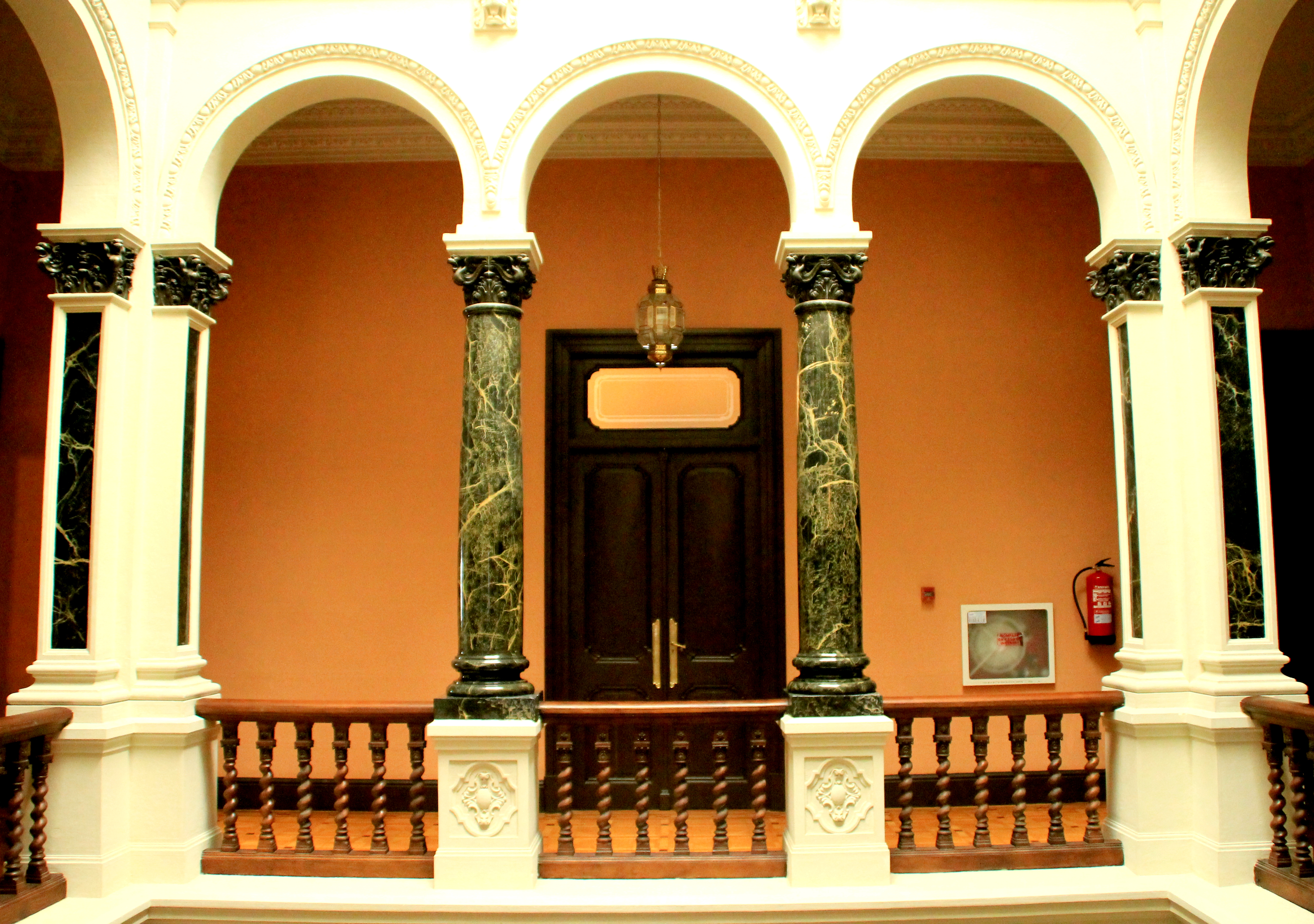
Interior of the palace

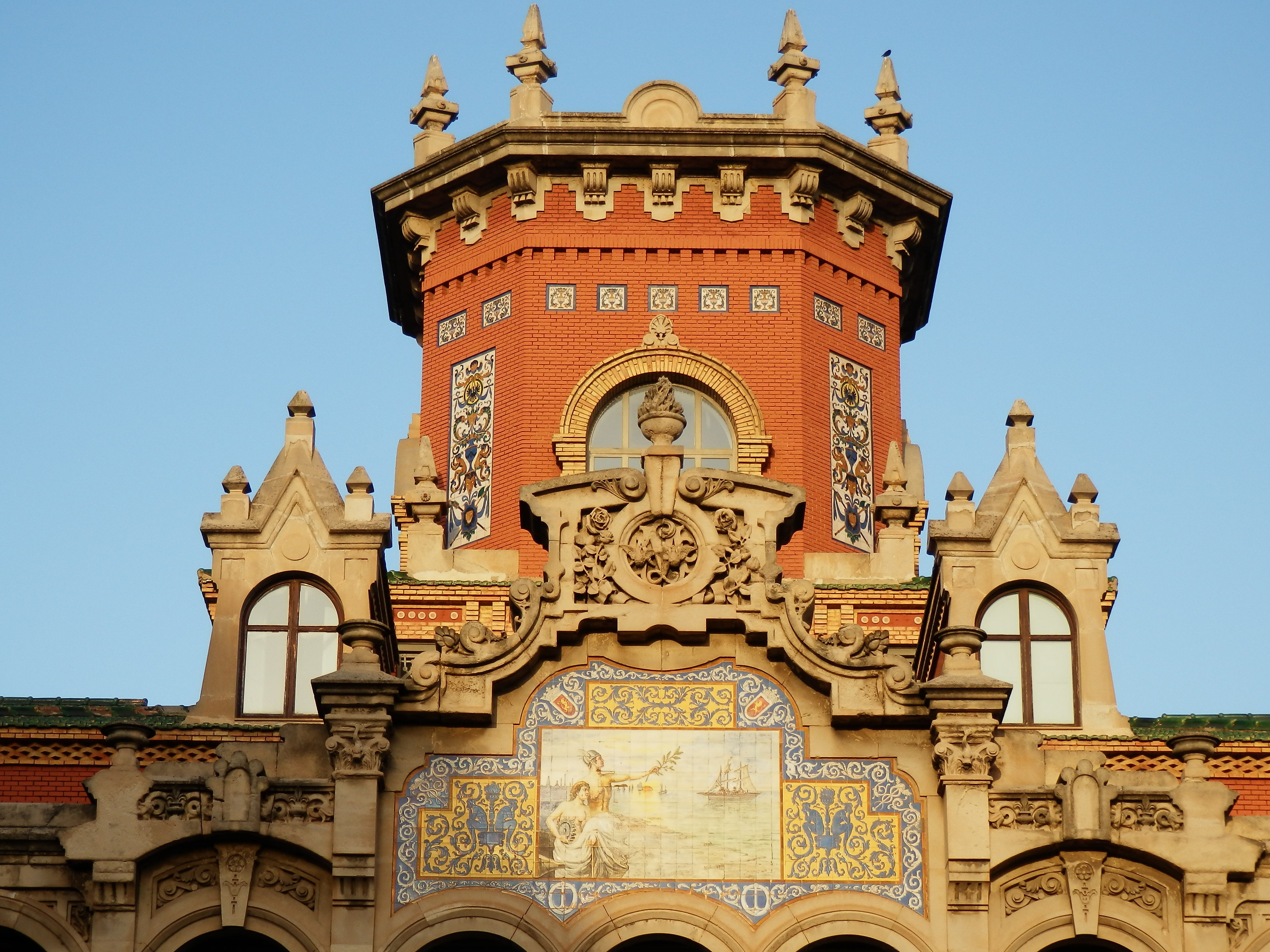
Building façade

== See also ==
- Palacio de Larrinaga de Zaragoza - YouTube
