= In a Dark Dark House =

2007 play by Neil LaBute

- Written by: Neil LaBute

Premiere
- Date premiered: May 16, 2007
- Place premiered: Lucille Lortel Theatre

In a Dark Dark House is a 2007 play by Neil LaBute. The play tells a tale of sexual and emotional abuse and two brothers who attempt to overcome it.

== Productions ==
In a Dark Dark House had its world premiere Off-Broadway at the Lucille Lortel Theatre in an MCC Theater production on May 16, 2007 and closed on July 7, 2007. Direction was by Carolyn Cantor with the cast that included Louisa Krause, Ron Livingston and Frederick Weller. The run was extended by two weeks "due to popular demand".

A production of the play ran at London's Almeida Theatre from November 2008 to January 2009. Director Michael Attenborough worked with LaBute to create a substantially different version of the play to the one that originally premiered in New York.

The revised version of the play made its West Coast premiere at The Matrix Theatre Company, Los Angeles, California, in July and August 2014. The reviewer for The Hollywood Reporter wrote: "It's among LaBute's most nakedly personal examinations of stunted males enmeshed in conflicts of intimacy, so much so that it almost self-consciously plays out as his own variation on motifs familiar from one of his most direct influences, Sam Shepard."

== Concept ==
The play takes place "on the grounds of a psychiatric facility.". It involves two brothers: Terry, in his late thirties and Drew, in his mid-thirties, and a girl, Jennifer, in her teens. Drew, a disbarred lawyer, is a patient at the hospital. The title is "lifted" from a section of the Ingmar Bergman film Scenes from a Marriage.

== Critical reception ==
Ben Brantley, in his review for The New York Times, wrote: "At its most basic, the plot of “House” becomes another LaButean exploration of how people use and betray one another. But there are subtler forces at work here, including Mr. LaBute's most sophisticated use of language thus far."
