= Into the Fire (TV series) =

- Genre: Thriller
- Written by: Tony Marchant
- Directed by: Jane Howell
- Starring: Donal McCann; David Morrissey; Sharon Duce; Sue Johnston; Neil McCaul; Stephen Lord; Anne Carroll
- Country of origin: United Kingdom
- Original language: English
- No. of series: 1
- No. of episodes: 3

Production
- Executive producer: Michael Wearing
- Producer: David Snodin
- Cinematography: Remi Adefarasin
- Running time: 50 minutes

Original release
- Network: BBC1
- Release: 14 February – 16 February 1996

Into the Fire is a British television thriller drama series, written by Tony Marchant, that first broadcast on BBC1 on 14 February 1996, and ran for three consecutive nights. The series, directed by Jane Howell, stars Donal McCann as Frank Cody, a businessman whose struggling leather goods company is thrown a lifeline when it wins a new order from America. But when he re-mortgages his house to finance the project, events take a dramatic turn, and death, deceit and adultery arise from a misguided scheme to commit insurance fraud via arson.

The series co-starred David Morrissey, Sharon Duce and Sue Johnston, and was partially inspired by novelist Thomas Hardy's The Mayor of Casterbridge. The series was originally due to transmit in the autumn of 1995, but was pushed back to February 1996. The series was actor David Morrissey's first of three projects with producer David Snodin, with whom he later worked on Holding On and Passer By. Notably, the series has never been re-broadcast or released on DVD.

== Cast ==
- Donal McCann as Frank Cody
- David Morrissey as Michael Ride
- Sharon Duce as Anita
- Sue Johnston as Lyn
- Neil McCaul as Martin
- Stephen Lord as Danny
- Anne Carroll as Ginny
- Carol Starks as Rachel
- Peter Wingfield as Karl
- Christopher Fairbank as Joyce
- Kate Reynolds as Holly

== Episodes ==
No.	Title	Directed by	Written by	Original release date
1	"Episode 1"	Jane Howell	Tony Marchant	14 February 1996
Morally upright businessman Frank Candy abandons his principals to save his leather goods company, which is thrown a lifeline by an order from America. He re-mortgages his house to finance the cost of the material, but the company later cancels the order, leaving him with the prospect of cutting his workforce. In his other capacity as a magistrate, he deals with an arsonist who is acquitted. In order to solve his problems, he meets the arsonist and employs him to burn down the factory in order to get the insurance money.
2	"Episode 2"	Jane Howell	Tony Marchant	15 February 1996
The arsonist employed by Frank gets caught up in the blaze when he goes to investigate and is killed. Frank feels guilty and tries to help the young boy's mother, Anita. Meanwhile, insurance investigator Michael Ride becomes suspicious after the forensic report comes to light.
3	"Episode 3"	Jane Howell	Tony Marchant	16 February 1996
Frank is under pressure and confesses to his wife that he set the fire up. Anita and Frank become lovers.

== Reception ==
Lucy Ellmann of The Independent, gave the series a negative review and called it ridiculous. She characterises the series as a work whose themes burn hotter than its drama, ultimately failing to deliver the emotional ignition it promises.
