= Ruth Sheen =

English actress

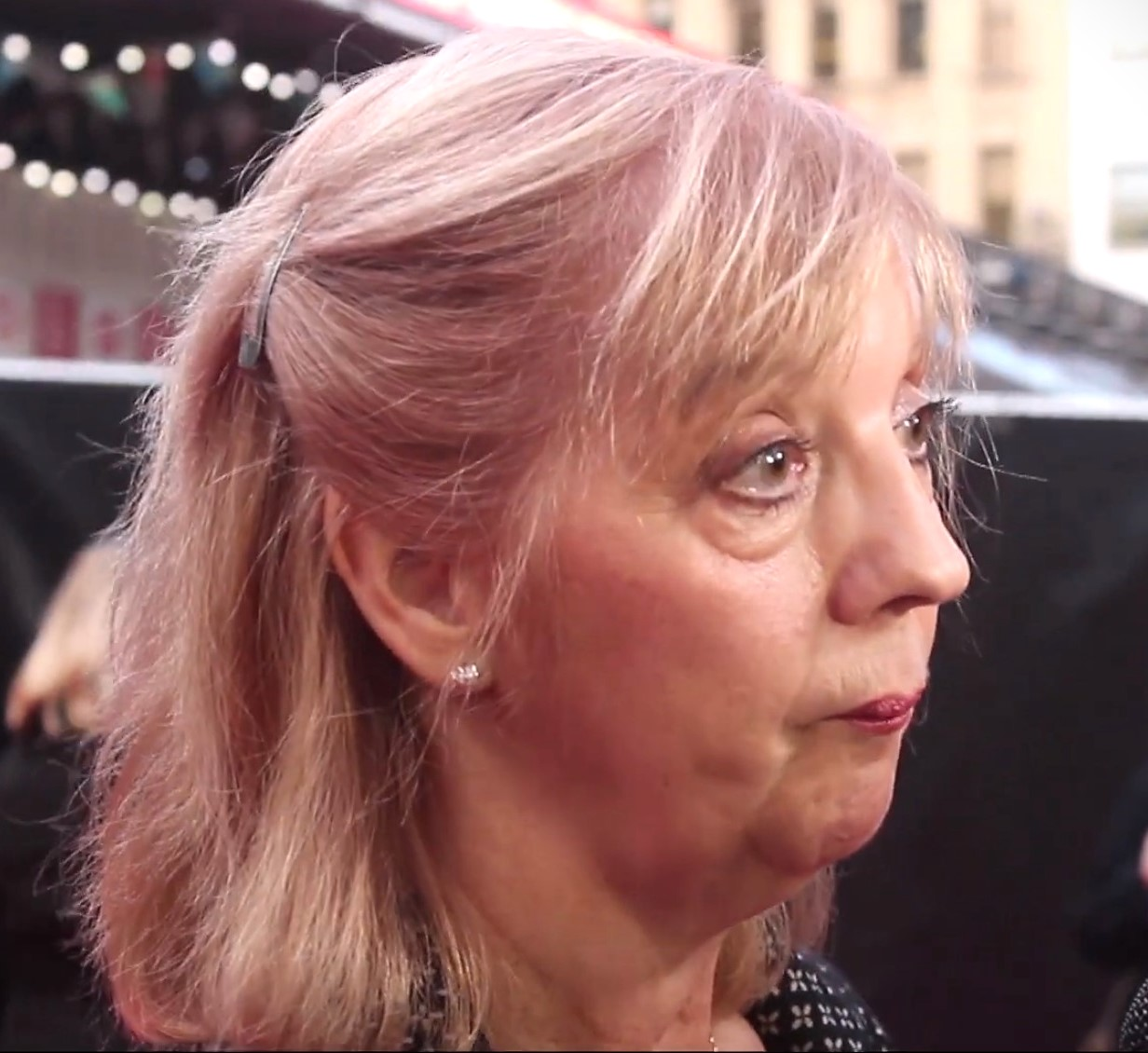
- Sheen in 2014
- Born: 1950 (age 75–76); Stepney, London, England
- Education: East 15 Acting School
- Occupation: Actress
- Years active: 1987–present

Ruth Sheen is an English actress. From the late 1980s, she has appeared in British television shows, films and plays. A participant in the films of Mike Leigh, she won the European Film Award for Best Actress for her performance as Shirley in Leigh's High Hopes (1988).

== Early life ==
Sheen was born in Stepney, London. She began her career training at the East 15 Acting School.

== Career ==
=== Television ===
Sheen had recurring roles as Nanny Simmons in Berkeley Square (1998) and as Nurse Ethel Carr in the series Bramwell (1995–1998). She also appeared as four different characters in six episodes of The Bill between 1989 and 2004. Also in 2004 she appeared in Agatha Christie’s Marple “The Murder at the Vicarage” as Mrs Tarrant.

She played Maureen Tacy in the series Doc Martin (2005) and appeared as Mrs Jones in the 2007 drama mini-series Fanny Hill, based on the erotic novel by John Cleland.

She appeared in Agatha Christie’s Poirot “Elephants Can Remember” (2013) as Madame Rosentelle and in Misfits (TV Series) as Maggie.

Sheen was the titular Elizabeth in "The Trial of Elizabeth Gadge", a 2015 episode of Inside No. 9. She has a supporting role as a pub landlord in the comedy series Brassic (2019–). Also in 2015. she appeared in the TV series Unforgotten as Lizzie Wilton and in 2016 in Midsomer Murders “Saints and Sinners” as Valerie Horton. In 2017, she acted in the TV mini-series Prime Suspect 1973 as Renee Bentley.

In 2021, Sheen featured in the last episode of the miniseries It's a Sin.

In 2022, Sheen appeared as secretary of private investigator C.B. Strike starting in season five of the series Strike.

=== Film ===
Sheen frequently appears in the films of Mike Leigh. She played the female lead in High Hopes (1988), a laughing woman in Secrets & Lies (1996), Maureen in All or Nothing (2002), Lily in Vera Drake (2004), Gerri in Another Year (2010), and Sarah Danby in Mr. Turner (2014).

High Hopes was her breakthrough role. After Another Year she commented on Leigh's preference for improvisation: "It's a unique way of working... He's quite a hard taskmaster."

She played the mother of the character Jamie in Philip Ridley's 2009 feature film Heartless, and appeared in Welcome to the Punch (2013). She played Elsie in the 2016 film adaptation of A Street Cat Named Bob.

=== Theatre ===
Sheen performed in Mike Leigh's play It's a Great Big Shame at the Theatre Royal Stratford East in 1993. She has appeared in Stoning Mary at the Royal Court Theatre, Market Boy at the Royal National Theatre and An Oak Tree at the Soho Theatre, all in London. In 2007, she played Lyn, opposite Ben Whishaw's Steven, in the world premiere of Philip Ridley's stage play Leaves of Glass at the Soho Theatre.

== Filmography ==
Film
Year	Title	Role	Notes
1987	Little Dorrit	Society Lady	
1988	High Hopes	Shirley	
1989	The Angry Earth	Nurse Berry	
1993	When Pigs Fly	Marge	
1995	The Young Poisoner's Handbook	Molly	
1996	Different for Girls	Nosey Neighbour	
1996	Secrets & Lies	Laughing Woman	
1999	Virtual Sexuality	Jackie Lovett	
1999	Bait	Café Woman	Short
2002	All or Nothing	Maureen	
2003	Cheeky	Tamara	
2004	Vanity Fair	Miss Pinkerton	
2004	Vera Drake	Lily	
2005	Imagine Me & You	Mrs Webster	
2007	Hush Your Mouth	Mrs Collins	
2007	Run Fatboy Run	Claudine	
2007	The Curry Club	Audrey	Short
2009	Heartless	Marion Morgan	
2010	Another Year	Gerri	
2010	The Hardest Part	Bus Lady	Short
2010	Mulligatawny	Maggie	Short
2013	Welcome to the Punch	Iris Warns	
2014	Mr. Turner	Sarah Danby	
2015	The Woman in the Crypt	Mother	
2015	A Royal Night Out	Joan Hodges	
2015	SuperBob	Pat	
2016	A Street Cat Named Bob	Elsie	
2018	VS.	Fiona	
2021	Cyrano	Mother Marthe	
2023	The After	Tabatha	Short
2024	Touch	Mrs. Ellis	
2025	The Thursday Murder Club	Aunt Maud	
TBA	Booty	Mrs. Dougans	Short (post-production)
TBA	Sweetly It Turns	Joy	(Completed)

Television
Year	Title	Role	Notes
1988	King and Castle	Receptionist	Series 2, episode 2
1989	The Bill	Mrs. Taylor	Series 5, episode 15
1989	London's Burning	Danny's Mum	Series 2, episode 7
1990	Making Out	Delia	Series 2, episode 4
1990	ScreenPlay	Helen Baldwin	Series 5, episode 3
1991	ScreenPlay	Karen	Series 6, episode 7
1992	A Fatal Inversion	Forensic Scientist	Miniseries (1 episode)
1992	Downtown Lagos	Chocolate Cake Woman	Miniseries (3 episodes)
1992	Casualty	Barbara George	Series 7, episode 5
1992	Ghostwatch	Emma Stableford	TV movie
1992	The Bill	Mrs. Grant	Series 8, episode 98
1994	Screen Two	Viv Hastings	Series 10, episode 12
1995	Peak Practice	Pauline Wadham	Series 3, episode 5
1995–1998	Bramwell	Nurse Ethel Carr	Series 1–4 (27 episodes)
1995	Cracker	Jean McIlvanney	Series 3, episode 1
1997	Holding On	Alice	Miniseries (5 episodes)
1997	The History of Tom Jones: a Foundling	Mrs. Harris	Miniseries (1 episode)
1998	Berkeley Square	Nanny Simmons	Series 1 (6 episodes)
2000	Don Quixote	1st Wench/Young Lady	TV movie
2000	Never Never	Sandra	Miniseries (2 episodes)
2000	Lorna Doone	Betty Muxworthy	TV movie
2001	The Infinite Worlds of H.G. Wells	Mrs MacMananan	Miniseries (1 episode)
2002	Plain Jane	May	TV movie
2002	White Teeth	Maureen	Miniseries (1 episode)
2003	The Bill	Patricia Clarke	Series 19, episodes 12 & 13
2004	Agatha Christie's Marple	Mrs. Tarrant	Series 1, episode 2
2004	The Bill	Mrs. Brunton	Series 20, episodes 93 & 94
2005	Twenty Thousand Streets Under the Sky	Aunt Winnie	Miniseries (1 episode)
2005	Footprints in the Snow	Lady Victualler	TV movie
2005	Doc Martin	Maureen	Series 2, episode 6
2005	The English Harem	Emily	TV movie
2006	Vital Signs	Val	Series 1 (4 episodes)
2007	A Class Apart	Ruth	TV movie
2007	Fanny Hill	Mrs. Jones	Miniseries (2 episodes)
2007	Coming Up	Jane	Series 5, episode 1
2009	Brave Young Men	Stephanie Malloy	TV movie
2010	Silent Witness	Esther Carey	Series 13, episodes 1 & 2
2012	Accused	Mo's Mum	Series 2, episode 2
2013–2014	The Mimic	Martin's Mum	Series 1–2 (4 episodes)
2013	Agatha Christie's Poirot	Madame Rosentelle	Series 13, episode 1
2013	Misfits	Maggie	Series 5 (5 episodes)
2014	Our Girl	Nan	Series 1, episodes 3 & 5
2014	Call the Midwife	Sister Maltby	Series 4, Christmas Special
2015	Inside No. 9	Elizabeth Gadge	Series 2, episode 3
2015	Unforgotten	Lizzie Wilton	Series 1 (6 episodes)
2016	Midsomer Murders	Valerie Horton	Series 18, episode 5
2017	Prime Suspect 1973	Renee Bentley	Miniseries (6 episodes)
2018	The Woman in White	Mrs. Clements	Miniseries (3 episodes)
2019	Moving On	Maggie	Series 10, episode 5
2019	Brassic	Kath	Series 1 (6 episodes)
2021	It's a Sin	Sandra	Miniseries (1 episode)
2021–2023	The Nevers	Mrs. Beechum	Series 1 (6 episode)
2022	Strike	Pat Chauncey	Series 5 and 6 (4 episodes each)
2023	Hijack	Elaine Atterton	Series 1, episode 5

== Awards ==
In 1989, Sheen won the European Film Award for Best Actress for the role of Shirley in High Hopes. She was nominated for British actress of the year by the London Film Critics' Circle for Another Year.
