= Big Bad World (disambiguation) =

Big Bad World is a 2008 album by Plain White T's.

Big Bad World may also refer to:

- Big Bad World (1999 TV series), a 1999–2001 British comedy-drama series
- Big Bad World (TV series), a 2013 British sitcom
- "Big Bad World", a 2012 song by Guy Sebastian from Armageddon
- "Big Bad World", a 2013 song by Kodaline from In a Perfect World
