= Nisha Nayar =

British actress

- Born: Nisha K. Nayar; Oyster Bay, Dar es Salaam, Tanzania
- Occupation: Actress
- Years active: 1987–present

Nisha K Nayar (born 7 June) is a British actress. After coming to prominence in the 1993 film Bhaji on the Beach, she had starring roles as Debra Kumar in the film Out of Hours in 1998 and as Elaine "the Pain" Boyak in the CBBC series The Story of Tracy Beaker from 2002 to 2005. She also appeared as Joyce Hammond in the ITV crime drama Rose and Maloney between 2004 and 2005 and starred as Fran Keeley in the Channel 4 drama Before We Die in 2021.

== Life and career ==
Nisha K. Nayar was born in Oyster Bay, Dar es Salaam, Tanzania before her family relocated to Toronto, Canada when Nayar was six years old. Her family then relocated again to the United Kingdom, and Nayar grew up in St Albans, Hertfordshire, England and later trained at The Anna Scher Theatre School.

Nayar made her acting debut in 1987, in the BBC sci-fi television programme Doctor Who in which she played the uncredited role of Red Kang. In 1991, Nayar appeared in her first major stage role in Our Own Kind. Nayar appeared as a nurse in an episode of Full Stretch, before landing the role of Ladhu in the film Bhaji on the Beach directed by Gurinder Chadha. The same year, she appeared as Jamila in 4 episodes of The Buddha of Suburbia. In 1994, she appeared in Medics as Jawinder and played the role of Shanti in the BBC mini-series Siren Spirits. In 1995, Nayar appeared in 2 episodes of Cone Zone as Jess, and played Nasreen in Cardiac Arrest. In 1996, she played Angela in the film Different for Girls, Olive in My Wonderful Life and Shaila in 4 episodes of London Bridge. In 1997, Nayar portrayed Tina in the film Sixth Happiness and in an episode of Holding On as Karen. She starred as Debra Kumar in the BBC medical drama series, Out of Hours in 1998. Between 1999 and 2001, she appeared as Stephanie in Big Bad World.

In 2002, Nayar began starring as Elaine Boyak in the CBBC series The Story of Tracy Beaker, based on the Jacqueline Wilson book of the same name. Elaine was introduced in the first series as the social worker of the title character, Tracy Beaker (Dani Harmer). Her nature earned her the nickname "Elaine the Pain" from the children in care and staff alike. Nayar appeared as a main character in all five series of the show and made her final appearance in the last episode in 2005. She also appeared as Elaine in Tracy Beaker: The Movie of Me and the Children in Need special Tracy Beaker Parties with Pudsey in 2004. Between 2004 and 2005, Nayar appeared as Joyce Hammond in the ITV crime drama series Rose and Maloney starring Sarah Lancashire and Phil Davis. In 2005, Nayar appeared in two episodes of Doctor Who, Bad Wolf and The Parting of the Ways, portraying a female programmer who is exterminated by the Daleks. Nayar is also a voice-over artist and has provided voice over work for various television commercials including Deezer, Nivea, Heinz and Dove. She has also narrated various stories on podcasts and radio. She has also starred in audio plays including The Jungle Book.

In September 2017, Nayar appeared as Samira Kohli in the medical soap opera Doctors on a recurring basis. In 2019 she appeared as Rahael Malik in The Bay. In 2021, Nayar starred in the Channel 4 drama Before We Die as Fran Keeley. Nayar also made a cameo appearance as Elaine Boyak in the music video for "Someday" by Keisha White, the theme song for My Mum Tracy Beaker.

== Filmography ==
Year	Title	Role	Notes	Ref.
1987	Doctor Who	Red Kang	Uncredited; 4 episodes	
1989	The Bill	Nasreen Shah	Episode: "All Part of the Job"	
1993	Full Stretch	Nurse Coyle	Episode: "Ivory Tower"	
1993	Bhaji on the Beach	Ladhu	Film	
1993	The Buddha of Surburbia	Jamila	Miniseries; all 4 episodes	
1994	The Bill	Kate Jaffrey	Episode: "One of Them"	
1994	Medics	Jawinder	Episode: "In the Dark"	
1994	Siren Spirits	Shanti	Episode: "Memsahib Rita"	
1994	Memsahib Rita	Shanti	Television film	
1995	Cone Zone	Jess	2 episodes	
1995	Cardiac Arrest	Nasreen	Supporting role; 5 episodes	
1996	Different for Girls	Angela	Film	
1996	My Wonderful Life	Olive	Episode: "True Love"	
1996	London Bridge	Shaila	4 episodes	
1997	Sixth Happiness	Tina	Film	
1997	Holding On	Karen Pope	Series 1: Episode 8	
1998	Out of Hours	Debra Kumar	All 6 episodes	
1999–2001	Big Bad World	Stephanie	Recurring role; 6 episodes	
1999	The Darkest Light	Nisha	Film	
1999	Underground	Seema	Television film	
2001	A Loving Act	Rani Dayal	Short film	
2002–2005	The Story of Tracy Beaker	Elaine "the Pain" Boyak	Regular role; 72 episodes	
2002	In America	Debra Kumar	Film	
2002	Sirens	D.C. Kate Oakley	Two-part drama series	
2003	The Principles of Lust	Olivia	Film	
2003	Holby City	Shazia Aslam	Episode: "A Kind of Loving"	
2003	Merseybeat	Anne Dawson	2 episodes	
2004	Tracy Beaker's Movie of Me	Elaine "the Pain" Boyak	Television film	
2004–2005	Rose and Maloney	Joyce Hammond	Main role; 9 episodes	
2004	Tracy Beaker Parties with Pudsey	Elaine "the Pain" Boyak	Children in Need special	
2005	Doctor Who	Female Programmer & Voice of Big Brother	Episodes: "Bad Wolf" and "The Parting of the Ways"	
2006	Cracker	D.S. Saffron Saleh	Television film	
2010	The Bill	Tanisha Baker	Episode: "New Beginnings"	
2011	Casualty	Anjna Chawhan	Episode: "Altered States"	
2013	Count Arthur Strong	Ghita	Episode: "Doctor Two"	
2014	Law & Order: UK	Namita Cresswell	Episode: "Repeat to Fade"	
2015	Midwinter of the Spirit	Nasira Khan	Series 1: Episode	
2016	Alleycats	WPC Sehmi	Film	
2017	uk18	Kate	Film	
2017	Doctors	Samira Kohli	Recurring role; 6 episodes	
2019	The Bay	Rahael Malik	Series 1: Episode 6	
2019	Chronos	Liz	Short film	
2021	Before We Die	Fran Keeley	Main role; 6 episodes	
2023	Unicorns	Shamim		
