= Gabrielle Reidy =

Irish actress

- Born: 23 July 1960; Malahide, County Dublin
- Died: 13 October 2014 (aged 54); London
- Occupation: Actor
- Years active: 1971–2012
- Known for: The Plough and the Stars

Gabrielle Reidy (23 July 1960 – 13 October 2014) was an Irish actress, who appeared in multiple plays at the Abbey Theatre in Dublin from 1971 to 2012. She acted in 23 films, 31 television series, and 25 theatre performances in Ireland and the United Kingdom.

== Early life and education ==
Reidy was born on 23 July 1960 and grew up in Malahide, County Dublin. Her father was a former Royal Air Force pilot, and later an Aer Lingus pilot. She had two older sisters. She studied modern languages at Trinity College Dublin, as Ireland had no professional acting qualifications at the time. Reidy's mother died during Gabrielle's first year of college.

== Career ==
Reidy acted in 23 films, 31 television series, and 25 theatre performances. Reidy's first acting appearance was in 1971, at the age of 11, in a performance of Seán O'Casey's The Shadow of a Gunman at the Abbey Theatre in Dublin. At Trinity College Dublin, she joined the players at the college, and performed in Footfalls and Hippolytus. In 1979, she performed in Graham Reid's play The Death of Humpty Dumpty at the Abbey Theatre. At the Abbey Theatre, she also worked alongside Joe Dowling and Tómas Mac Anna. In 1989, she wrote and starred in an adaptation of Isabella Leitner's autobiographical Pulitzer Prize-nominated book Fragments of Isabella. The play was about Leitner's experiences in surviving The Holocaust.

After moving to London in 1989, Reidy appeared in a 1995 version of The Trojan Women (also known as the Women of Troy) at the Royal National Theatre, as well as Much Ado About Nothing at Shakespeare's Globe. She starred alongside Daniel Radcliffe in Equus. Reidy played the mother of Greit (Scarlett Johansson) in the film Girl with a Pearl Earring. In 2010, she began starring in Abbey Theatre's production of Seán O'Casey's play The Plough and the Stars. In 2012, she went on the play's national tour. In 2011, she starred in Andrew Sheridan's play Winterlong at the Soho Theatre. She also performed as Hermione from Shakespeare's The Winter's Tale.

On Irish television, she starred in The Clinic, and played Monica Hall in Never The Same Again: Monica Hall. On British television, she starred in Doctors, Waking The Dead, Holby City, Out of Hours, Scott & Bailey, The Bill, and Prime Suspect. She was once nominated for an IFTN award.

== Personal life ==
Reidy met her husband, actor Gary Lilburn, whilst performing Desire Under the Elms in 1995. The couple had one son. Lilburn was from Limerick. Reidy was a member of Amnesty International.

In 2014, Reidy was diagnosed with cancer. She died of the disease on 13 October 2014, aged 54, at her London home. On the same day, the Abbey Theatre gave a standing ovation in her memory.
