= Goodbye Cruel World (TV series) =

- Genre: Drama
- Written by: Tony Marchant
- Directed by: Adrian Shergold
- Starring: Sue Johnston; Alun Armstrong; Brenda Bruce
- Country of origin: United Kingdom
- Original language: English
- No. of episodes: 3

Production
- Running time: 60 minutes

Original release
- Network: BBC2
- Release: 6 January – 20 January 1992

Goodbye Cruel World is a 1992 British drama starring Sue Johnston, Alun Armstrong and Brenda Bruce. The three-part series was aired on BBC2 between 6 and 20 January 1992 and was aired again in summer 1993. Johnston played the character of Barbara Grade, a woman who is diagnosed with a terminal degenerative illness, and the series focused on how Barbara and her family and friends deal with her worsening condition. It was written by Tony Marchant and directed by Adrian Shergold and was nominated for Best Drama Serial at the 1993 British Academy Television Awards.

== Cast ==
- Sue Johnston – Barbara Grade
- Alun Armstrong – Roy Grade
- Brenda Bruce – Marjory
- Jonny Lee Miller – Mark
- Eric Allan – Michael
- Oliver Ford Davies – Collins
- Mick Ford – Spector
- Will Knightley – Cheevers
- Rosalind March – Mary
- Lucy Meacock – Julia
- Louisa Milwood-Haigh – Sally
- Julian Wadham – Gavin Kaye
