= Sweet Revenge (British TV series) =

- Genre: Drama
- Written by: Sandy Welch
- Directed by: David Morrissey
- Starring: Paul McGann; Sophie Okonedo; Pam Ferris; Richard Lintern; Amber Sealey; Enzo Cilenti; Steven Mackintosh
- Composer: Rob Lane
- Country of origin: United Kingdom
- Original language: English
- No. of series: 1
- No. of episodes: 2

Production
- Executive producers: Laura Mackie; Jane Tranter
- Producer: Catherine Wearing
- Cinematography: Sean Bobbitt
- Editor: Paul Tothill
- Running time: 60 minutes
- Production company: BBC Worldwide

Original release
- Network: BBC1
- Release: 15 October – 16 October 2001

Sweet Revenge is a two-part British television drama series, created and written by playwright Sandy Welch, that first broadcast on BBC1 on 15 October 2001. The series stars Paul McGann, Sophie Okonedo and Pam Ferris, and follows Patrick Vine (McGann), an enigmatic Professor, who, when not teaching History and Anthropology, runs a sideline in helping people get revenge. As a group of wronged Londoners employ Vine to help exact revenge upon those who have mistreated them, Ellen (Okonedo), who is seeking revenge on her cheating husband, gradually grows closer to Vine. The series was directed by actor David Morrissey.

The series broadcast over two consecutive nights, with the concluding episode following on 16 October 2001. The first episode drew 6.61 million viewers, while viewing figures for the second were unrecorded. The series is yet to be released on DVD; however, both episodes are available to watch for free on YouTube.

== Production ==
The series was commissioned in March 2001, and Catherine Wearing and Sandy Welch, who previously collaborated on the critically acclaimed BBC adaptation of Our Mutual Friend, reunited for the first time in three years to bring the project to life. Filming commenced in April 2001; with a potential transmission set for the Autumn of that year. Having only previously directed a number of shorts, Sweet Revenge marks David Morrissey's "large-scale" directorial debut. Sarah Smart was the first actor confirmed for the series, revealing that she had been given the role of "a mousy student who is very downtrodden."

== Cast ==
- Paul McGann as Professor Patrick Vine
- Sophie Okonedo as Ellen Lewis
- Pam Ferris as Denise Williams
- Richard Lintern as Peter Coin
- Amber Sealey as Chloe Dubois
- Enzo Cilenti as Will Pointon
- Steven Mackintosh as Sebastian Harper
- Christopher Naylor as Stuart Sharp
- Sarah Smart as Lisa Craig
- Susan Lynch as Madelaine Adair
- Bindya Solanki as Asha
- Tim Preece as Dr Francis Symons
- Joe McGann as Young Patrick
- John Duttine as DI Briars
- John Johnson as Richard Horwood
- Oliver Porter as Ben Adair
- Philip Delancy as Alex Carver
- Terence Vincent as Hendrix
- Rowland Davies as Judge Cady

== Episodes ==
No.	Title	Directed by	Written by	Airdate	UK viewers (million)
1	"Episode 1"	David Morrissey	Sandy Welch	15 October 2001	6.61
When Ellen's boyfriend leaves her for another woman, she is introduced to Patrick, a history professor with a sideline in helping people getting even.
2	"Episode 2"	David Morrissey	Sandy Welch	16 October 2001	N/A
While Ellen gloats over Peter's court appearance, the frustrated Will exacts his own form of revenge on the hated Stuart. Patrick becomes increasingly out of his depth as Madelaine seeks even greater revenge.
