= Anne Carroll =

British actress and director

Anne Carroll MBE (June 1940 – 15 November 2018) was a British actress and director. In the 2011 New Year Honours, Carroll received an MBE "for services to community theatre in Barnes", as she had run the youth theatre group, Barnes Theatre Company in Barnes, London for two decades. Carroll was the founder of the OSO Arts Centre (Old Sorting Office) arts venue in Barnes. She died on 15 November 2018.

== Filmography ==
- Bellman and True (1987)
- Amongst Barbarians (1990)
- Coldblooded (1995)

== Television ==
- The Man Who Finally Died (1959)
- Ghost Squad (1962)
- Dixon of Dock Green (1966)
- Budgie (1971)
- Public Eye (1971)
- New Scotland Yard (1972)
- Clayhanger (1976)
- BBC Television Shakespeare (1981)
- Tales of the Unexpected (1981)
- Take Me Home (1989)
