= Blind Justice (1994 film) =

1994 TV film

- Film release poster
- Genre: Western
- Written by: Daniel Knauf
- Directed by: Richard Spence
- Starring: Armand Assante; Elisabeth Shue; Robert Davi
- Music by: Richard Gibbs
- Country of origin: United States
- Original language: English

Production
- Executive producers: Neal H. Moritz; David Heyman
- Producer: Rick Nathanson
- Cinematography: Jack Conroy
- Editor: C. Timothy O'Meara
- Running time: 85 minutes
- Production company: Moritz-Heyman Productions

Original release
- Network: HBO
- Release: June 25, 1994

Blind Justice is a 1994 American Western television film directed by Richard Spence, written by Daniel Knauf, and starring Armand Assante, Elisabeth Shue, and Robert Davi. It premiered on HBO on June 25, 1994.

== Plot ==
Canaan, a mysterious gunfighter left nearly blind from Civil War combat, roams through Mexico with a baby he has sworn to protect. On his way to a town where a family will supposedly adopt the baby, Canaan passes through a border town where U.S. Cavalry officers assigned to deliver a shipment of silver are under attack from bandits. With some reluctance, Canaan steps in to help the soldiers.

== Cast ==
- Armand Assante as Canaan
- Elisabeth Shue as Caroline
- Robert Davi as Alacran
- Adam Baldwin as Sergeant Hastings
- Ian McElhinney as Father Malone
- Danny Nucci as Roberto
- Jason Rodriguez as Hector
- M. C. Gainey as "Bull"
- Titus Welliver as Sumner
- Michael O'Neill as Spencer Heyman
- Douglas Roberts as Captain Teller
- Gary Carlos Cervantes as Luis
- Jesse Dabson as Private Wilcox
- Clayton Landey as Ernie Fowler
- James Oscar Lee as Beauchamp
- Ric San Nicholas as Remick
- Jimmy Herman as Shaman
- Jack Black as Private
- Daniel O'Haco as Scout
- Jeff O'Haco as Vato
- Forrie J. Smith as Coyote
- Michael A. Goorjian as Soldier #1
- Tom Hodges as Soldier #2
- Tori Bridges as Jessica Canaan (uncredited)

== Production ==
Filming took place at the Apacheland Movie Ranch in Apache Junction, Arizona, and in Mesa, Arizona. Blind Justice was the last major film production to be shot at Apacheland, which was heavily damaged by fire in February 2004 and not rebuilt. The film is partially inspired by the DC Comics character Jonah Hex.
