= Keith Barron =

English actor (1934–2017)

- Barron as Gregory Wilmot in 1974
- Born: 8 August 1934; Mexborough, West Riding of Yorkshire, England
- Died: 15 November 2017 (aged 83)
- Occupations: Actor, television presenter
- Years active: 1961–2017
- Spouse: Mary Pickard (m. 1959)
- Children: 1

Keith Barron (8 August 1934 – 15 November 2017) was an English actor and television presenter who appeared in films and on television from 1961 until 2017. His television roles included the police drama The Odd Man, the sitcom Duty Free, and, playing Gregory Wilmot in period drama Upstairs, Downstairs.

== Career ==
Born in Mexborough in the West Riding of Yorkshire, (Note: 'South Yorkshire' did not exist before 1 April 1974. 'West Riding of Yorkshire' is correct.) Barron completed his national service in the Royal Air Force and his acting career started at the Sheffield Repertory Theatre, where he worked with a young Patrick Stewart and also met his wife, Mary, a stage designer. He became well known to British television viewers in the early 1960s as the easygoing Detective Sergeant Swift in the Granada TV series The Odd Man and its spin-off. His major breakthrough, however, was as Nigel Barton in the writer Dennis Potter's semi-autobiographical plays Stand Up, Nigel Barton and Vote, Vote, Vote for Nigel Barton (both 1965) in BBC1's The Wednesday Play anthology series; he later played a very similar character in Potter's Play For Today episode Only Make Believe (1973).

Barron made many one-off television appearances, from Redcap and Z-Cars in the mid-1960s, to Randall and Hopkirk (Deceased), Strange Report, The New Avengers, Thriller, The Professionals, Foyle's War, and A Touch of Frost. He made two appearances in Upstairs, Downstairs as Australian Gregory Wilmot. In 1982, he appeared in the Dutch show De lachende scheerkwast. In March 1983 he was a guest in the Doctor Who story Enlightenment, replacing Peter Sallis who was unavailable. He was a frequent voiceover artist for British TV commercials and public information films. Barron also played a starring role as Bob Ferguson in the 1993 Granada series The Case-Book of Sherlock Holmes, entitled The Last Vampyre.

In 1989 he starred on television in a story of relationships in a new town in the Midlands entitled Take Me Home, with Annette Crosbie as his wife and Maggie O'Neill as his girlfriend. One of his best-loved and best-remembered roles was in the 1980s Yorkshire Television sitcom Duty Free. In the 1990s he co-starred in the sitcoms Haggard and All Night Long. In 1990, he appeared as a contestant on Cluedo, facing off against fellow actor Andrew Sachs.

On the big screen he appeared in Baby Love (1968) and David Puttnam's film Melody (1971) as Mr Latimer.

Barron voiced the character of Morgan Jefferies in the 1995 BBC Radio 4 sitcom England's Glory opposite Lynda Baron.

Barron also appeared as a celebrity guest in Dictionary Corner on several episodes of the Channel 4 words and numbers game Countdown between 1999 and 2008.

In the 2000s he was a regular character on the ITV Sunday-night drama Where the Heart Is. In 2014 he reprised his role of David Pearce in the touring stage show of the TV series 'Duty Free'. He also starred in the first series of the BBC drama The Chase.

He was the star on Bunn and Co., a radio show that was broadcast from March 2003 to April 2004 on BBC Radio 4. Barron's performance in the BBC's Test the Nation IQ test show on 2 September 2006 gave him an IQ of 146. In 2007 Barron joined ITV1's Coronation Street as George Trench. In 2011, Barron starred in the BBC show, Lapland, a role which he returned to for a series, Being Eileen, from February 2013. His last television appearance was in BBC comedy Not Going Out as a toy store employee in the Christmas Special which was shown after his death. He was given an "In Memory Of" at end of credits.

== Personal life ==
Barron served in the RAF as part of his National Service. In 1980, he and his wife opened a restaurant in Hayle in Cornwall. After three years they returned to London and Barron resumed his acting career full time.

Barron died on 15 November 2017 after a short illness. He lived in the Surrey town of East Molesey, a short distance from Hampton Court Palace and had a second home in St Ives, Cornwall.

== Selected filmography ==
=== Film ===
Year	Title	Role	Notes
1969	Baby Love	Doctor Robert Quayle	
1970	The Man Who Had Power Over Women	Jake Braid	
1971	The Firechasers	Jim Maxwell	
1971	She'll Follow You Anywhere	Alan Simpson	
1971	Melody	Mr. Latimer – Daniel's father	Uncredited
1971	Freelance	Gary	
1973	Nothing But The Night	Dr. Haynes	
1974	The Land That Time Forgot	Bradley	
1976	At the Earth's Core	Dowsett	
1976	Voyage of the Damned	Purser Mueller	
1986	God's Outlaw	Henry VIII	
1996	La passione	Roy	
1997	Police 2020	Eddie Longshaw	
2012	In Love with Alma Cogan	Cedric	

=== Television ===
Year	Title	Role	Notes
1961	A Chance of Thunder	Bank Cashier	1 episode
1961	The Night of the Match	Bob	TV movie
1961	The Avengers	Technician	Episode: "Dragonsfield"
1962/1976	Z-Cars	Barry Hulme/Billy Catlin	Episodes: "Further Enquiries"/"Prisoners"
1962-3	The Odd Man	Det. Sgt. Swift	17 episodes
1964	It's Dark Outside	Det. Sgt. Swift	8 episodes
1964-6	Redcap	Cpl. Harkness/Captain Lynne	Episodes: "It's What Comes After"/"The Alibi"
1965	Crane	Rene Leclerc	Episode: "A Violent Animal"
1965	The Troubleshooters	Miles	Episode: "The Way It Crumbles"
1965-7	The Wednesday Play	Various - Including Nigel Barton episodes	4 episodes
1967	Spywatch		
1967	Further Adventures of Lucky Jim	Jim Dixon	7 episodes
1967-76	Jackanory	Himself	43 episodes
1969	Randall and Hopkirk (Deceased)	Jarvis	Episode: "When Did You Start to Stop Seeing Things?"
1972	A Family at War	Major Harkness	Episode: "Two Fathers"
1973	Thinking Man as a Hero	David Duncan	TV movie
1973	Armchair Theatre	Henry	Episode: Red Riding Hood
1973/1980	Play for Today	Harry/Christopher Hudson	Episodes: Only Make Believe/Jessie
1974	Upstairs, Downstairs	Gregory Wilmot	2 episodes
1974	No Strings	Derek	6 episodes
1976	The New Avengers	Draker	Episode: "Target!"
1977	The Foundation	Don Prince	Episode: "Accident"
1977	Crown Court	Timothy Dorney	7 episodes
1977	The Professionals	Charles Nesbitt	Episode: "Private Madness, Public Danger"
1979	Telford's Change	Tim Hart	7 episodes
1979	Prince Regent	Charles James Fox	7 episodes
1981	Stay with Me Till Morning	Stephen Belgard	3 episodes
1982	Tales of the Unexpected	George Hitchman	Episode: "A Harmless Vanity"
1982	Holding the Fort	Trevor Chesterton	2 episodes
1982	De lachende scheerkwast	Mr. Carrington	2 episodes
1982-1983	West Country Tales	Narrator / Healer / The Rev. Anthony Shaw	6 episodes
1983	Doctor Who	Mr. Striker	Serial: "Enlightenment"
1984	Minder	Johnny Caine	Episode: "Senior Citizen Caine"
1984-5	Leaving	Daniel Ford	12 episodes
1984-6	Duty Free	David Pearce	22 episodes
1986-8	Room at the Bottom	Kevin Hughes	13 episodes
1989	Take Me Home	Tom	3 episodes
1990-2	Haggard	Squire Amos Haggard	14 episodes
1992	The Good Guys	Guy Lofthouse	16 episodes
1993	The Case-Book of Sherlock Holmes	Rob Ferguson	Episode: "The Last Vampyre"
1994	Under the Hammer	Ned Nunelly	Episode: "The Jolly Joker"
1996	The Ruth Rendell Mysteries	Inspector Masters	Episode: "A Case of Coincidence"
1996	Theatre of the Air	Eddie Mostyn	Episode: "I've Been Eddie Mostyn"
1997	Dalziel and Pascoe	Dick Elgood	Episode: "Deadheads"
1997	Pie in the Sky	Eric Dunfries	Episode: "Ugly Customers"
1998	Hetty Wainthropp Investigates	Gordon Gregson	Episode: "Digging for Dirt"
2000	Madame Bovary	L'heureux	
2000	Peak Practice	Jeff Barton	Episode: "Last Orders"
2001	Take Me	Don Chambers	5 episodes
2003	Clocking Off	Roy Fletcher	Episode: "Pat and Roy's Story"
2003-4	Where the Heart Is	Alan Boothe	15 episodes
2004	Midsomer Murders	Alan Clifford	Episode: "The Straw Woman"
2005	Dead Man Weds	Sandy Ball	4 episodes
2005	New Tricks	Ronnie Ross	Episode: "A Delicate Touch"
2006	Foyle's War	David Barrett	Episode: "Invasion"
2006	Judge John Deed	William Glyn	Episode: "One Angry Man"
2006	Hustle	Hemmings	Episode: "Price for Fame"
2006-7	The Chase	George Williams	10 episodes
2007	Coronation Street	George Trench	11 episodes
2008	A Touch of Frost	David Crewes	Episode: "Mind Games"
2008	Heartbeat	Les Hepplewhite	Episode: "Strike Up the Band"
2008-13	Casualty	Wardrobe/Basil King/Howard Coombes	Various
2009	Law & Order: UK	Vernon Mortimer	Episode: "Buried"
2009	Benidorm	Deputy Mayor	1 episode
2010	My Family	Harry	Episode: "Ben Behaving Badly"
2011	Lapland	Maurice	TV movie
2011-15	Doctors	Arthur Barrett/Ludo Jameson/Brian Olsen	3 episodes
2012-16	DCI Banks	Arthur Banks	10 episodes
2015-16	Holby City	Hugh Musgrove	3 episodes
2017	Not Going Out	Michael	Episode: "The True Meaning of Christmas"

=== Radio ===
- Not as Far as Velma, as Commissaire Henri Castang (1990)
- To the Manor Born, as Richard Devere (1997)
- My Turn to Make the Tea as Mr Pellet (2006)
