= David Morrissey =

English actor and filmmaker (born 1964)

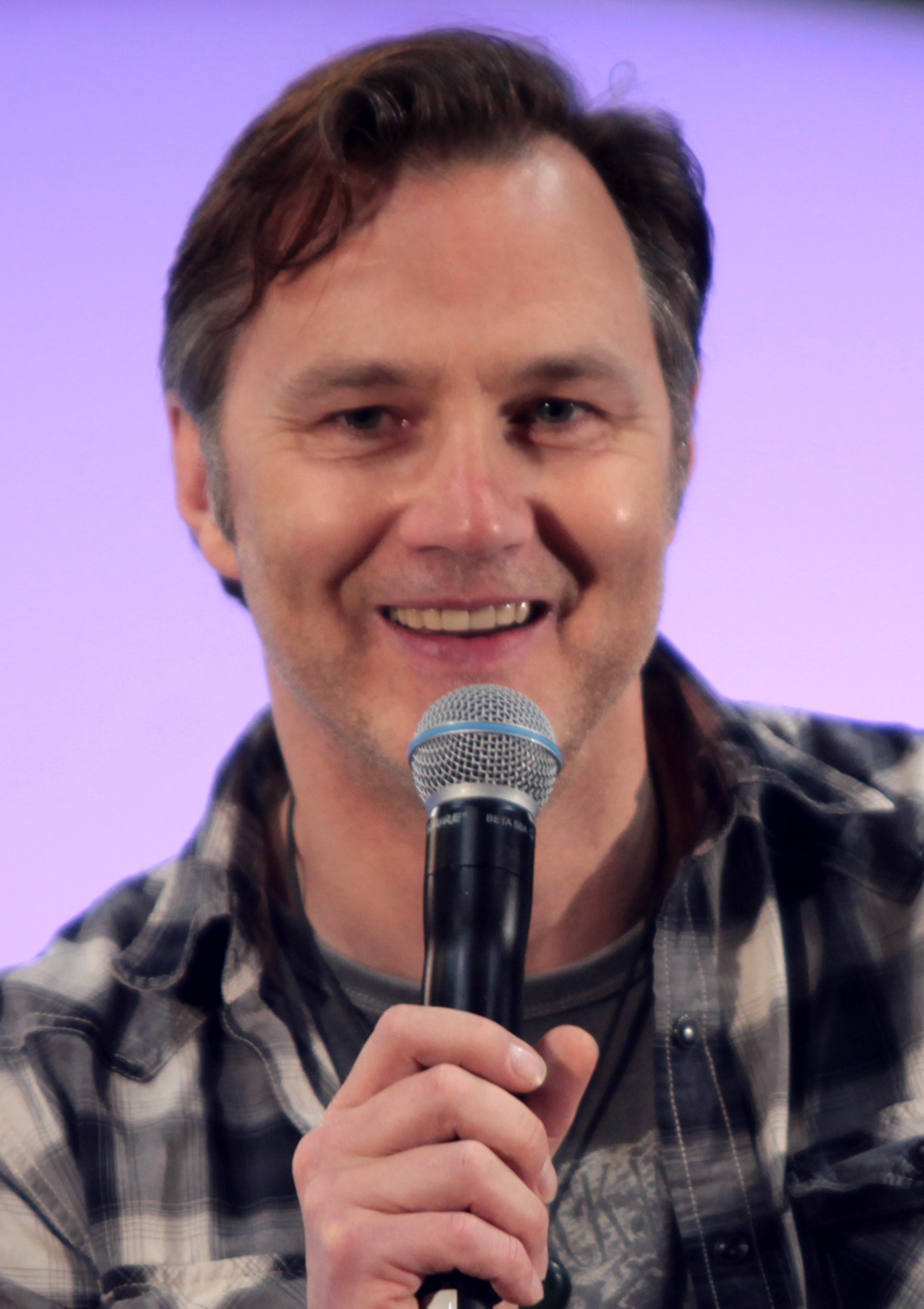
- Morrissey in May 2015
- Born: 21 June 1964 (age 62); Liverpool, England
- Occupations: Actor; filmmaker
- Years active: 1982–present
- Spouse: Esther Freud (m. 2006; sep. 2020)
- Children: 3

David Mark Joseph Morrissey (born 21 June 1964) is an English actor and filmmaker. He had numerous small roles in films and television series throughout the 1990s before achieving wider recognition for playing Gordon Brown in The Deal (2003), Stephen Collins in State of Play (2003), The Governor in the third and fourth seasons of The Walking Dead (2012–2015), and DCS Ian St Clair in Sherwood (2022–present). He has also acted extensively on stage with companies such as the Royal Shakespeare Company and Royal National Theatre.

Morrissey has directed short films and the television dramas Sweet Revenge (2001) and Passer By (2004). His feature-length directorial debut, the television film Don't Worry About Me (2010), premiered on BBC Two. He was nominated for the British Academy Television Award for Best Actor for State of Play and won a Best Actor award from the Royal Television Society for The Deal. He was awarded an honorary doctorate by Edge Hill University in 2016.

== Early life ==
David Mark Joseph Morrissey was born in the Kensington area of Liverpool on 21 June 1964, the son of Littlewoods employee Joan and cobbler Joe Morrissey. He has two older brothers named Tony and Paul, and an older sister named Karen. The family lived at 45 Seldon Street in Kensington. Decades later, as part of National Museums Liverpool's Eight Hundred Lives project, Morrissey wrote that the house had been in his family since at least 1900; his grandmother had been married there and his mother was born there. In 1971, the family moved to a larger and more modern house on the new estates at Knotty Ash, while Seldon Street was later demolished.

Morrissey was greatly interested in film, television, and Gene Kelly musicals as a child. He decided to become an actor after seeing a broadcast of Kes on television. At St Margaret Mary's Primary School, he was encouraged by a teacher named Miss Keller, who cast him as the Scarecrow in a school production of The Wonderful Wizard of Oz when he was 11 years old. Keller left the school soon after, leaving him without encouragement. His secondary school, De La Salle School, had no drama classes and made him think that the fear of bullying often dissuaded pupils from participating in lessons. On the advice of a cousin, he joined the Everyman Youth Theatre. For the first couple of weeks, he was quite shy and did not join in with the workshops. When he eventually participated, he ended up appearing in their production of Fighting Chance, a play about the 1981 riots in Liverpool.

By the age of 14, Morrissey was one of two youth theatre members who sat on the board of the Everyman Theatre. His contemporaries included Cathy Tyson, brothers Mark and Stephen McGann, and Ian Hart, the last being his friend since they were both five years old. He became friends with the McGann brothers and they introduced him to their brother Paul, who was on a break from his studies at the Royal Academy of Dramatic Art (RADA). When he was 15 years old, his father died from a terminal blood disorder at the age of 54, after a long period of illness. After leaving school at the age of 16, Morrissey moved to Wolverhampton to join a theatre company there, where he worked on sets and costumes.

== Career ==
=== Acting ===
==== 1980s ====
In 1982, Morrissey auditioned for One Summer, a television series by Willy Russell for Yorkshire Television and Channel 4 about two Liverpool boys who run away to Wales one summer. Russell had been attached to the Everyman for many years, and Morrissey had seen him while he was working behind the bar downstairs from the theatre, though the two had never been introduced. Morrissey went to at least eight auditions, and in one read for the part of Icky opposite Paul McGann, who was reading for Billy. McGann, five years older than Morrissey, believed that he was too old to be playing the part of 16-year-old Billy and stepped back from the production, leaving the role to go to Morrissey. Spencer Leigh got the part of Icky and Ian Hart played the supporting role of Rabbit. Russell had a professional disagreement with the director Gordon Flemyng and producer Keith Richardson over the casting of 18-year-old Morrissey and Leigh; he believed that the sympathy of 16-year-olds running away was lost by casting older actors. Russell subsequently had his name removed from the credits of the original broadcast. After filming One Summer for five months, Morrissey went travelling in Kenya with his cousins. When he returned to Britain, One Summer was being broadcast, and he dealt with the new experience of being recognised in public.

Morrissey had planned to study at RADA in London, but his colleagues at the Everyman encouraged him not to as he already had his Equity card. His One Summer co-star James Hazeldine convinced him otherwise, and he went to London for a year. He became homesick while there and did not enjoy the way RADA was turning him into a "bland actor". On a visit back to Liverpool he told Paul McGann's mother that he was considering leaving the college. Back in London, McGann met with him and reassured him that he had been through the same homesickness phase when he first went to RADA. Morrissey continued his studies at RADA and graduated on 1 December 1985.

After a year at RADA, Morrissey went back to Liverpool to perform in WCPC at the Liverpool Playhouse. He then did Le Cid and Twelfth Night with Cheek by Jowl, and spent two years with the Royal Shakespeare Company (RSC), principally with director Deborah Warner for whom he played the Bastard in King John in 1988. He saw the role as a learning opportunity, as he had often wondered at RADA if he would ever have the chance to act in classical theatre. His performance has been described as "the most contentious characterisation of the production"; he received negative critical reaction from The Daily Telegraph and Independent critics, but a positive opinion from the Financial Times. In The Guardian, Nicholas de Jongh wrote, "The Bastard, who has the most complex syntax in early Shakespeare, half defeats David Morrissey. His slurred, sometimes unintelligible diction helps to deflate the Bastard, but his bawling rhetoric strikes as mere sham rather than fierce plain speaking." Morrissey also spent time with the National, where he played the title role in Peer Gynt (1990). Michael Billington praised the unkempt energy of his performance. During this time, he lived on the housing estate in White City, where he and his flatmates were the frequent victims of burglars.

Morrissey's second television role came in 1987 when he played the 18-year-old chauffeur George Bowman, whose obsession with his employer and lover Alma Rattenbury (Helen Mirren) leads him to murder her husband, in an Anglia Television adaptation of Terence Rattigan's play Cause Célèbre. At the end of the 1980s, Morrissey met director John Madden for the first time. Madden was looking for an actor who could portray an ordinary man who turns out to be a mass murderer, in his film The Widowmaker (1990). He knew Morrissey was right for the part in his first audition. The next year, Morrissey appeared as Theseus in an episode of The Storyteller directed by Madden ("Theseus and the Minotaur", 1991), and as Little John in Robin Hood (1991). Robin Hood's cinema release clashed with that of Robin Hood: Prince of Thieves (1991). The latter, starring Kevin Costner in the title role, was a box office hit and left Morrissey's version forgotten. Morrissey was out of work in film and television for eight months after it was released. Eventually, he was cast in a leading role as a CID officer in the BBC television drama Clubland (1991). He almost lost the role a week into rehearsals when his appendix ruptured. In order to keep the part, and a flat in Crouch End he had just bought, Morrissey performed while he still had his stitches in.

==== 1990s ====
His role in The Widowmaker led to him being offered and taking many obsessive character roles; he played police officers in Black and Blue, Framed, Between the Lines and Out of the Blue, and soldier Andy McNab in The One That Got Away (1996). Morrissey first met screenwriter Peter Bowker when he played Detective Sergeant Jim Llewyn in the second series of Bowker's Out of the Blue. In 1994, he played customs officer Gerry Birch in the first series of The Knock, and Stephen Finney in the six-part ITV series Finney. In Finney, Morrissey assumed the role originated by Sting in Stormy Monday (Mike Figgis, 1988). He was the first choice for the part and had to learn to play the double bass.

Morrissey made his first appearance in a Tony Marchant drama playing Michael Ride in Into the Fire (1996), and the following year played the lead role of Shaun Southerns in Marchant's BBC series Holding On (1997). Southerns, a crooked tax inspector, was the first of many "men in turmoil" roles for Morrissey, and it earned him a nomination for the Royal Television Society (RTS) Programme Award for Best Male Actor the next year. In 1998, he appeared in Our Mutual Friend alongside Paul McGann. As he was a fan of the book, Morrissey asked director Julian Farino if he could play Eugene Wrayburn, but the role went to McGann. Farino had Morrissey in mind to play schoolmaster Bradley Headstone, a part Morrissey was reluctant to take until he read the script. He studied the role and decided to take it on the basis that the character was unloved and that his motivation by social class causes his mental health problems. His performance was described by a writer for The Guardian as bringing "unprecedented depth to a character [...] who is more commonly portrayed as just another horrible Dickens git." In the same year, he played Christopher "Kiffer" Finzi in Anand Tucker's Hilary and Jackie. His roles in Our Mutual Friend and Hilary and Jackie were described as his breakthrough roles by Zoe Williams of The Guardian.

In 1999, Morrissey returned to the theatre for the first and last time in nine years to play Pip and Theo in Three Days of Rain (Robin Lefevre, Donmar Warehouse). He continued to take in offers for stage roles, but turned them down because he did not want to be away from his family for long periods. Writing in Time Out, Jane Edwardes suggested that his role as Kiffer in Hilary and Jackie had inspired his casting as Pip in Three Days of Rain as the characters have similarities with each other. Morrissey was attracted to the role because the play began with a long speech and the cast and crew had only two weeks' rehearsal time. Next, he starred in Some Voices (2000), playing Pete. Morrissey researched the character of Pete, a chef, by shadowing the head chef at the Terrace Restaurant in Kensington, London and chopping vegetables in the kitchen for two hours a day. An Independent critic called him "an instinctive actor who can use his whole body to convey an inner turbulence". For his next film role as Nazi Captain Weber in Captain Corelli's Mandolin (2001), Morrissey researched the Hitler Youth and read Gitta Sereny's biography of Albert Speer, Albert Speer: His Battle with Truth. As with all of his roles, Morrissey created an extensive back story for Weber to build up the character.

==== 2000s ====
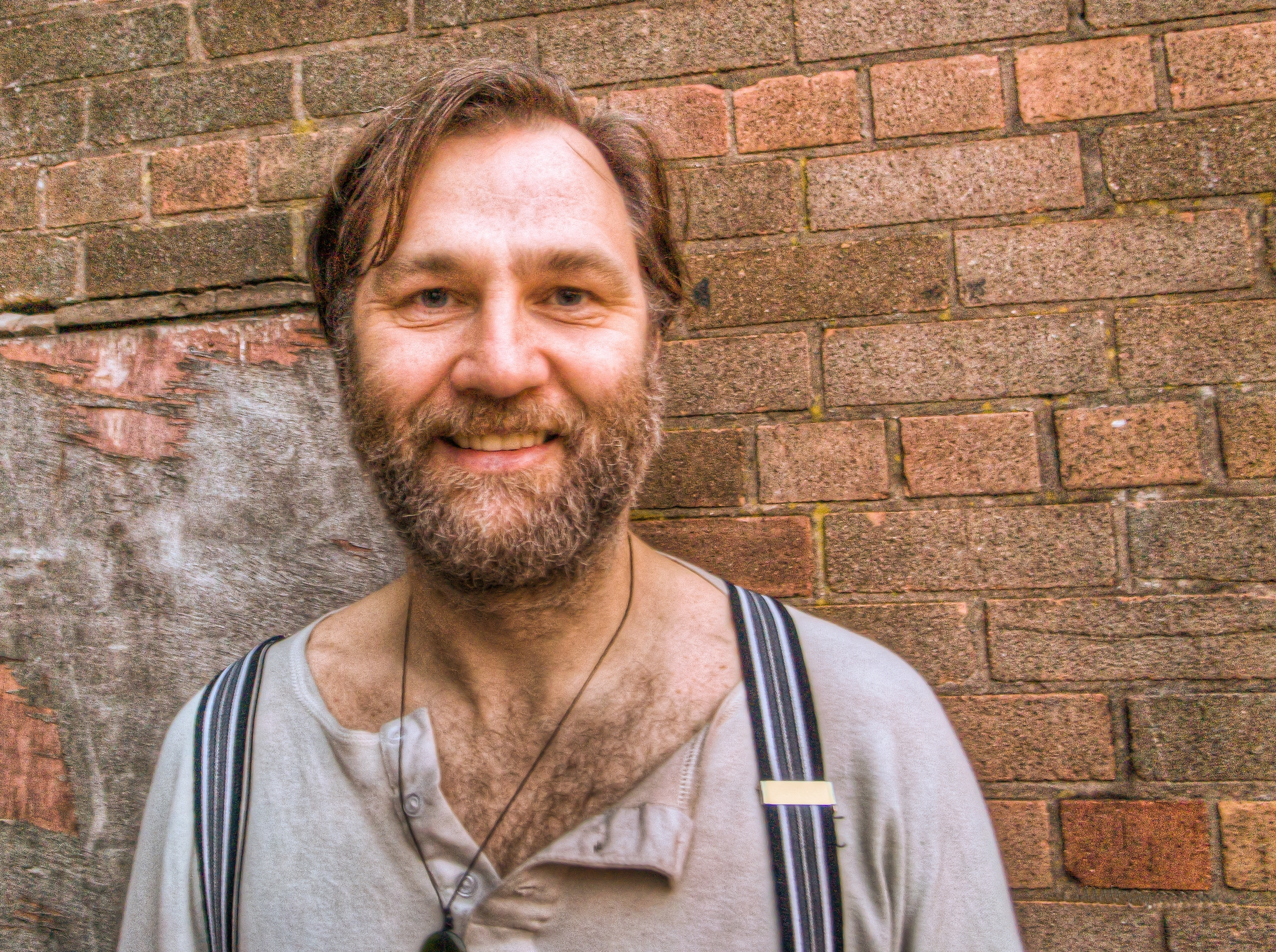
Morrissey during a Macbeth intermission in June 2011

Morrissey returned to television in 2002 playing Franny Rothwell, a factory canteen worker who wants to adopt his dead sister's son, in an episode of Paul Abbott's Clocking Off. His performance was described as characteristically powerful in The Independent. He also played tabloid journalist Dave Dewston in the four-part BBC serial Murder, and prison officer Mike in the part-improvised single drama Out of Control. He researched the latter part by shadowing prison officers in a young offenders' institution for a week. At the beginning of 2003, he played the role of Richie MacGregor in This Little Life, a television drama about a mother who has to cope with her 16-week-premature baby. Morrissey researched premature births by speaking to paediatricians at the Royal Free Hospital in Hampstead.

Morrissey's next major leading role was as Member of Parliament (MP) Stephen Collins in Paul Abbott's BBC serial State of Play (2003). Morrissey received the scripts for the first three episodes and was keen to read the last three. They had not been completed when he originally requested them but Abbott told him how Collins' story concludes. Unsure how to approach the role, Morrissey was advised by his friend, director Paul Greengrass, to get Collins' job as politician right. Morrissey contacted State of Play producer Hilary Bevan Jones, who set up meetings between Morrissey and select committee members Kevin Barron and Fabian Hamilton. Both politicians educated Morrissey on how difficult it is to commute to London from a constituency outside the capital. Morrissey was also able to shadow Peter Mandelson around the House of Commons for a fortnight. He questioned Mandelson about his job as a cabinet minister but did not ask about his personal life. Mandelson told him about how politics can quickly "seduce" MPs who have worked hard to get into Parliament.

That same year, he played Gordon Brown in Peter Morgan's single drama The Deal (2003), about a pact made between Brown and Tony Blair (Michael Sheen) in 1994. Unlike his research for the fictional State of Play, Morrissey discovered that no politicians wanted to talk to him for this fact-based drama, so he turned to journalists Jon Snow and Simon Hoggart. He also travelled to Brown's hometown of Kirkcaldy and immersed himself in numerous biographies of the man, including Ross Wilson's documentary films on New Labour in the year surrounding the 1997 election. When speaking to many of Brown's friends to gain insight into his "private persona", Morrissey discovered that Brown was funny, approachable and charming, which were characteristics he did not see in his "public persona". To look like Brown, Morrissey had his hair dyed and permed, and put on 2 stone (28 lb/13 kg) in body weight in six weeks. The director Stephen Frears originally wanted to cast a Scottish actor as Brown but was persuaded by other production staff to cast Morrissey.

His acting in State of Play and The Deal won him considerable acclaim; he was nominated for the British Academy Television Award for Best Actor for his role as Collins but lost to his co-star Bill Nighy. His performance in The Deal was acclaimed by Charlie Whelan, Gordon Brown's former spin doctor, and Tim Allan, a deputy press secretary of Tony Blair. A BBC News Online writer praised Morrissey's grasp of Brown's physical tics in a review that criticised the rest of the film. Morrissey's performance won the RTS Programme Award for Best Male Actor the next year, this time beating Nighy. The RTS jury wrote of Morrissey, "The strength of this performance brought to the screen, and to life, all of the characteristics and traits of the man he portrayed in a way that was both credible and convincing." In 2009, Morrissey declined the opportunity to play Brown again in The Special Relationship, Morgan's third Blair film, as he did not want to get into the mindset of playing Brown for just one scene.

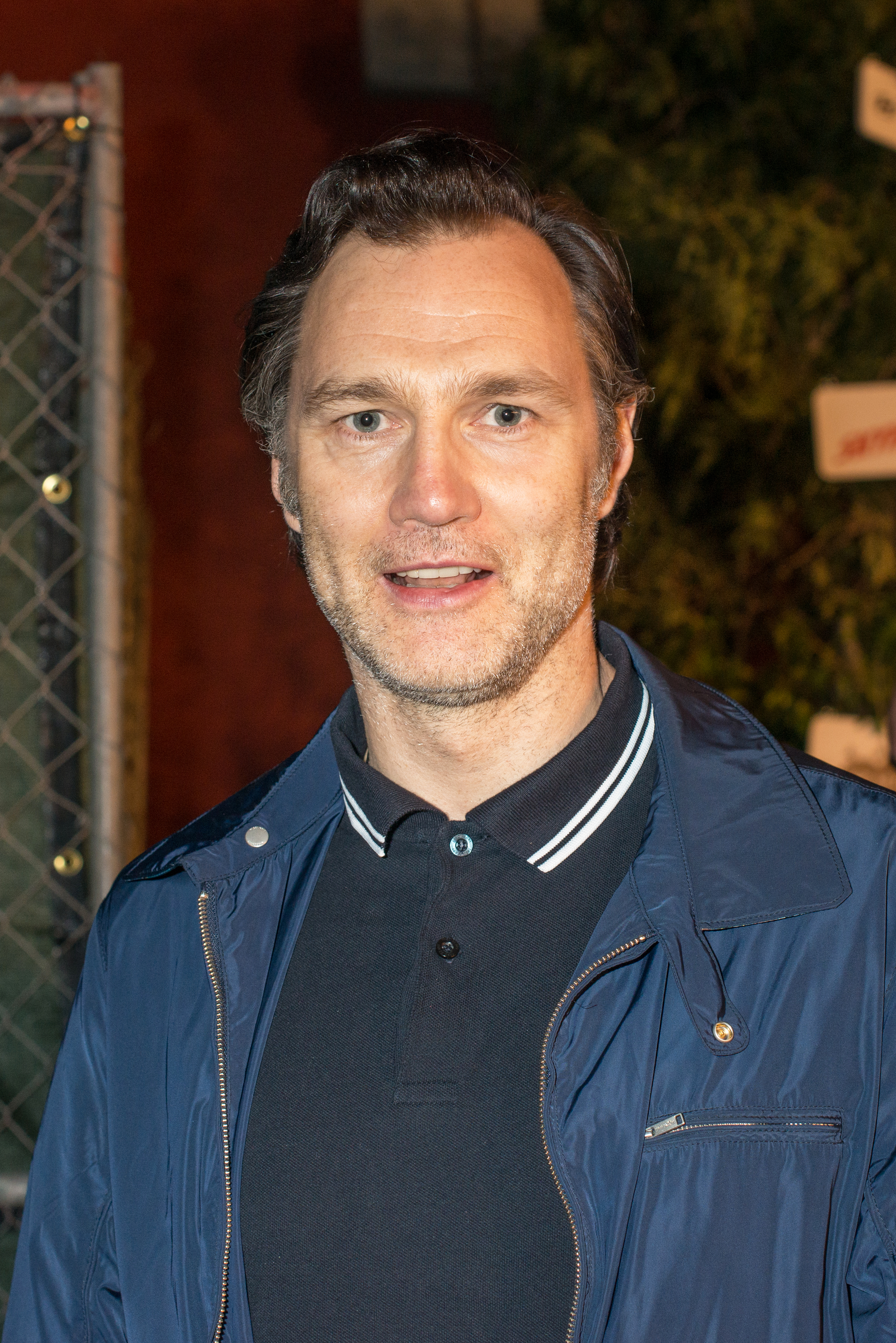
Morrissey in July 2013

Morrissey was eager to play a comic role after starring in these dramas. He subsequently reunited with Peter Bowker for the BBC One musical serial Blackpool, in which he plays Blackpool arcade owner Ripley Holden. Bowker remembered Morrissey from Out of the Blue and wanted to build on the actor's sense of humour and to cast him against type. Before filming began, Morrissey spent four days in Blackpool talking to the locals and finding out how the arcades worked. His performance was described in The Daily Telegraph as "a powerful mixture of barely suppressed danger and vulnerable, boyish charm." A public poll on bbc.co.uk ranked him the second best actor of 2004. Morrissey reprised the role in 2006 in the one-off sequel Viva Blackpool!. He was pleased to revive Ripley after filming dramatic roles since the original serial.

The following years saw Morrissey cast in two high-profile feature films; while filming the Brian Jones biopic Stoned (2005), he got an audition for psychiatrist Dr. Michael Glass, the male lead in Basic Instinct 2 (2006). He was flown out to Los Angeles for a one-hour screen test with Sharon Stone. Their immediate rapport led to the screen test being extended by another hour and Morrissey's casting in the role. Morrissey had enjoyed the first film and liked the script for the sequel. He read up on psychiatry and worked out in a gym for the nudity scenes. The film was a box office and critical failure. The Washington Post criticised the film's focus on Morrissey's character and called the actor "overmatched by Stone" and "a sad sack", and the Seattle Post-Intelligencer called him "a charisma-challenged non-entity". The same Washington Post critic later wrote in the Los Angeles Times that because Morrissey was not a film star, the chemistry between him and Stone had been spoiled. Nathan Rabin of The A.V. Club wrote that Morrissey had "the charisma of beige wallpaper" and that "the producers could have replaced him halfway through shooting with a handsome mahogany coat rack and nobody would be able to tell the difference". The bad reviews depressed Morrissey, and he briefly considered giving up acting, but instead saw the role as a chance to learn.

Immediately after filming Basic Instinct 2, he began work on The Reaping (2007) in Louisiana, in which he played science teacher Doug Blackwell opposite Hilary Swank. The role had been offered to him quite late in pre-production, and he flew to Baton Rouge the Monday after Basic Instinct 2 wrapped. He took the role because he was a fan of Swank, and Hopkins' film The Life and Death of Peter Sellers (2004), and he preferred the thriller aspect of the Reaping script above the horror aspect. After a week of filming, production had to be suspended when Hurricane Katrina hit the state. He found the filming schedule quite demanding, particularly the three weeks of night filming and a scene in which his character is attacked by a plague of locusts, most of which were computer-generated in post-production but some were real on camera. The Reaping was released in 2007 and performed badly in cinemas. Despite the failures of both films, Morrissey was grateful that they opened him up to more film offers from Hollywood.

In March 2006, Morrissey filmed a role in The Water Horse: Legend of the Deep (2007) in New Zealand. While there, he was offered the role of father Danny Brogan in Cape Wrath, an Ecosse Films series about a family being moved on a witness protection scheme to a mysterious village. He signed on to the seven-part series in September 2006 and filmed the series until the end of the year. He relished working on the character's back story as it confounded the expectations of both him and the audience. The series was broadcast in Britain and America in 2007. The following year, he played the part of Colonel Brandon in Andrew Davies' serial Sense and Sensibility. When he first got the script in 2007, he was unsure if British television needed another Jane Austen adaptation, but he took the role when he saw how Davies had given more screen time to the male characters than they get in the 1995 film adaptation. He also appeared as Thomas Howard, Duke of Norfolk in The Other Boleyn Girl (2008). He compared Norfolk to bassist Lemmy from Motörhead and researched the role by reading history books and literature from the 16th century.

From November 2008 to January 2009, Morrissey returned to the theatre for the first time in nine years to appear in the Almeida Theatre's British premiere of Neil LaBute's In a Dark Dark House. He played Terry, one of two brothers who had been abused as a child, opposite Steven Mackintosh and Kira Sternbach. He took the role because he liked LaBute's previous play, The Mercy Seat (2002). After accepting the part, he researched the character by reading case studies of adults who were abused when they were children. He learned about how they coped with the shame of their abuse, and incorporated those feelings into his acting. He was also able to consult LaBute during rehearsals but avoided asking him exactly how to play Terry. In The Daily Telegraph review that criticised the play, Charles Spencer wrote that Morrissey's was the best performance "as the blue-collar older brother who reveals extraordinary depths of grief, damage and forgiveness that finally light up this dark, flawed play." Benedict Nightingale of The Times initially believed that Morrissey's acting was "a bit stiff, almost as if he was waiting for his cues rather than reacting instantaneously to their content" but found him more impressive as the play went on.

In December 2008, he appeared alongside his Blackpool co-star David Tennant in "The Next Doctor", the 2008 Christmas special of Doctor Who, playing Jackson Lake, a man who believes he is the Doctor after his mind is affected by alien technology. Morrissey had been asked to appear in the series before but had to turn down the offers due to other commitments. He approached the character like any other dramatic part, and was influenced in his performance by previous Doctor actors William Hartnell, Patrick Troughton and Tom Baker. Secrecy surrounded the exact details of Morrissey's role in the episode; until the day of broadcast his character was referred to only as "the other Doctor". This prompted media speculation that Morrissey would be taking over the lead role after Tennant quit, and in October 2008 he was reported as a favourite of bookmakers. He was pleased that the episode was a "decoy" for the truth that actor Matt Smith had actually been chosen for the part of the Eleventh Doctor. In September 2009, he told entertainment website Digital Spy that he would gladly return to the show if asked.

In March 2009, Morrissey appeared as corrupt police detective Maurice Jobson in Red Riding, the Channel 4 adaptation of David Peace's Red Riding novels. Morrissey already knew the directors of the films, enjoyed reading the script and had either worked with his co-stars on other projects, or wanted to work with them. He liked the flaws in the Jobson character and that he differs from typical vigilante police officers portrayed on television. Morrissey said of Jobson, "I think he sets out to be a good cop, he tries to do his job well but he gets involved in some corruption and realises that being a 'bit' corrupt is like being a 'bit' pregnant. You either are or you're not." He received a Best Actor nomination from the Broadcasting Press Guild for the role. At the end of the year, Morrissey played Bobby Dykins in the John Lennon biopic Nowhere Boy (2009). As a self-confessed "Beatles geek", Morrissey relished the opportunity to star in the film about Lennon's childhood.

He was described by the British Film Institute as one of the most versatile English actors of his generation.

==== 2010s ====
Morrissey was active on screen throughout 2010. He starred as Theunis Swanepoel, the interrogator of Winnie Madikizela-Mandela, in the BBC single drama Mrs Mandela. His performance was praised by The Guardian and Independent critics. The following months saw him star as British Transport Police officer Mal Craig in the second series of BBC One's Five Days, Roman soldier Bothos in Neil Marshall's feature Centurion, stalking victim Jan Falkowski in U Be Dead, and Colonel John Arbuthnot in the Agatha Christie's Poirot adaptation of Murder on the Orient Express.

Morrissey returned to a weekly television role at the end of 2010 playing police detective Tom Thorne in Thorne, a six-part television series for Sky1 that was adapted from Mark Billingham's novels Sleepyhead and Scaredy Cat. After reading Lifeless during his time filming The Water Horse in New Zealand, Morrissey searched the Internet for more information. He found an interview in which Billingham stated his preference for Morrissey to play Thorne should a screen adaptation ever be made. When he returned to the UK, Morrissey arranged a meeting with Billingham and the two began developing the TV series. Morrissey shadowed officers in the Metropolitan Police's murder unit during their duties to learn about their jobs. He discovered that the officers felt undervalued in their jobs, and he incorporated these feelings into the series. Sky first broadcast the series on 10 October. Morrissey received approval for the role; Andrea Mullaney wrote in The Scotsman, "Morrissey is never less than watchable and he brings a brooding presence to the role of Thorne." and Adam Sweeting for The Arts Desk called him "authentic as the phlegmatic, low-key Thorne."

In 2011, Morrissey starred as Robert Carne in South Riding, and played Dunlop in the Lionsgate crime drama feature Blitz. In May 2011, he returned to the Everyman Theatre to play the eponymous king in Macbeth. Morrissey talked about the role to criminologists, to draw parallels with real-life serial killers, and focused on Macbeth's status as a war hero and his childless relationship with Lady Macbeth. Morrissey's performance was commended by Laura Davis in the Liverpool Daily Post, who highlighted his delivery of his lines and portrayal of Macbeth "[shifting] from straight-spined statesman to a fervent slayer". Clare Brenan of The Observer offered similar praise but noted that Morrissey's vocal inflections were sometimes "flat and rushed". Continuing his roles in Shakespeare productions, Morrissey played Northumberland in "Richard II", a BBC Two film adaptation of the play of the same name and the first episode of the series The Hollow Crown, broadcast in July 2012.

Morrissey joined the cast of The Walking Dead for its third season in 2012. He portrayed The Governor, a major villain from the graphic novel upon which the series is based. Morrissey read the prequel novel Rise of the Governor to gain insight into the character and his motivations. He also worked with an accent coach and listened to politicians with Southern accents, including Bill Clinton. He returned for the fourth season in 2013, and made a cameo appearance in 2015. In 2014, Morrissey returned to British television in the David Nicholls drama The 7.39 and the three-part serial The Driver, written by Danny Brocklehurst.

Morrissey was made an Honorary Doctor of Arts (HonDA) by Edge Hill University in 2016. From 10 September to 10 October that year, he starred in Hangmen by Martin McDonagh, at the Royal Court Theatre. The play followed Harry Wade, a former hangman, after the abolition of hanging in Great Britain in 1965. The following year he joined the cast of The League of Gentlemen for their 2017 revival.

From January 2018, Morrissey appeared as Mark Antony in Julius Caesar at the new Bridge Theatre. In April that year, he also starred as Inspector Tyador Borlú in the BBC2 drama The City and the City, adapted from China Miéville's novel of the same name by screenwriter Tony Grisoni.

==== 2020s ====
In 2022, he played the main antagonist Gorka in the Italian horror-fantasy film Dampyr. He also starred in the 2024 sci-fi film Slingshot.

=== Filmmaking ===
"People like to think it's a democratic process, but it's not; it's a dictatorship. As an actor I like working with strong directors, and as an actor you're a 'freak' with the control taken away. Directing gives you a real appreciation of the difficulties of other people's jobs."

— Morrissey on film direction

In the early 1980s, Morrissey developed a filmmaking craft at the Rathbone Theatre Workshop, a Youth Opportunities Programme that taught school-leavers skills for a year. With the workshop, Morrissey shot short silent films on Super 8, where he was taught by Bert Byron, who introduced him to US Independent and foreign films for the first time. Although the scheme paid £23.50 a week and took young people off unemployment benefits, Morrissey reflected in 2009 that many of the participants were just used as lackeys. After his acting career escalated, he started directing because he was aware that, as an actor, he was coming into a project quite late into development and then leaving before post-production, and he wanted to see a film through to the end. Morrissey has said that he prefers to keep acting and directing separate, and would not direct anything he is acting in.

His first major project was Something for the Weekend (1996), which he wrote and produced. Initially called The Barber Shop, the title was changed to avoid a clash with another film. His directorial debut, the short A Secret Audience, centres on a meeting between Napoleon Bonaparte and Pope Pius VII. His second short, Bring Me Your Love, was based on the short story by Charles Bukowski, and stars Ian Hart as a journalist bringing flowers to his wife in a mental hospital. It was screened in front of Some Voices. An Independent critic wrote that Bring Me Your Love "holds out great promise" for Morrissey and The Observer reviewer wrote that it was worth seeing but was not as impressive as A Secret Audience. Bring Me Your Love was produced by Tubedale Films, a studio Morrissey formed with his brother Paul and wife Esther Freud. In 2001, Morrissey directed Sweet Revenge, a two-part BBC television film starring Paul McGann that got him a BAFTA nomination for Best New Director (Fiction). In 2004, Morrissey reunited with Tony Marchant to direct the two-part television film Passer By, about a man (James Nesbitt) who witnesses an attack on a woman (Emily Bruni) but does nothing to stop it. Morrissey was brought onto the project after reading the first draft of Marchant's script. The script went through five more drafts before being filmed over 30 days. Morrissey developed his directing techniques by watching the directors on films and television series that he acted in; he took the minor role of Tom Keylock in Stoned so that he could watch Stephen Woolley at work.

On 20 July 2007, Morrissey was given an Honorary Fellowship from Liverpool John Moores University for contributions to performing arts. In the same year, he made his feature debut directing Don't Worry About Me, a film about a London boy falling in love with a Liverpool girl. The film was shot on a budget of £100,000 on location in Liverpool in September and October 2007 and had its world premiere at the 2009 London Film Festival. Joseph Galliano wrote in The Times that Don't Worry About Me is "a very understated film and feels more like European Art Cinema." The film was broadcast on BBC Two on 7 March 2010 and released on DVD the next day.

In 2009, Morrissey and Mark Billingham launched the production company Sleepyhead, which produced the Thorne television series. The company was a part of Stagereel, a production house previously set up by Morrissey's brother Paul. The company bought the rights to adapt the Thorne novels and Morrissey was already developing it to pitch to television channels when Sky made an offer to broadcast it. As of 2010, Morrissey and Tubedale Films were developing two feature films with financing from the UK Film Council. Morrissey criticised the Cameron–Clegg coalition government's decision to close the UK Film Council, as he believed it was an asset to first-time filmmakers. The organisation's funding role was taken over by the British Film Institute in 2011.

== Charity work ==
In 2009, Morrissey and a team of filmmakers ran a series of drama workshops for Palestinian refugee children in Beirut, in conjunction with the UNRWA. On his return to England, he set up the Creative Arts School Trust (CAST), a charity for the purpose of training teachers and continuing the workshops in Lebanon and elsewhere.

Morrissey is a patron of The SMA Trust (a charity that funds research into spinal muscular atrophy), Liverpool's Unity Theatre, and the human rights organisation Reprieve.

== Personal life ==
Morrissey was introduced to novelist Esther Freud by actor Danny Webb, and the two dated for around 13 years before marrying in a ceremony on Southwold Pier on 12 August 2006. They had a daughter, Anna, and two sons, Albie and Gene, before separating in 2020. They had split their time between homes in North London and Walberswick.

Morrissey is a lifelong supporter of his hometown football team Liverpool F.C. and the Labour Party. In 2014, he was one of 200 public figures who were signatories to an open letter in The Guardian expressing their hope that Scotland would vote to remain part of the United Kingdom in that year's referendum on the issue.

In May 2026 he appeared on BBC Radio 4's Desert Island Discs, where his choices included "You'll Never Walk Alone" by Gerry and the Pacemakers, Keith Jarrett's The Köln Concert, Leonard Bernstein's On the Waterfront and The Beatles' "She's Leaving Home". In the episode, he discusses being a recovering alcoholic who has been sober for 21 years as of 2026.

== Awards ==
Year	Award	Category	Title	Result
1997	Royal Television Society Programme Award	Best Male Actor	Holding On	Nominated
2001	British Academy Television Craft Award	New Director (Fiction)	Sweet Revenge	Nominated
2003	Royal Television Society Programme Award	Best Male Actor	The Deal	Won
2003	British Academy Television Award	Best Actor	State of Play	Nominated
2010	Broadcasting Press Guild Award	Best Actor	Red Riding	Nominated
2011	Liverpool Daily Post Arts Awards	Best Actor	Macbeth	Won
2013	Saturn Award	Best Supporting Actor	The Walking Dead	Nominated
2014	Saturn Award	Best Guest Star	The Walking Dead	Nominated
