= Take Me Home (TV series) =

- Genre: Drama
- Created by: Tony Marchant
- Written by: Tony Marchant
- Directed by: Jane Howell
- Starring: Keith Barron; Maggie O'Neill; Reece Dinsdale; Annette Crosbie
- Country of origin: United Kingdom
- Original language: English
- No. of series: 1
- No. of episodes: 3

Production
- Producer: David Snodin
- Production locations: Telford, Shropshire, England, UK
- Cinematography: Kevin Rowley
- Editor: Roy Sharman
- Running time: 60 minutes
- Production company: BBC

Original release
- Network: BBC1
- Release: 2 May – 16 May 1989

Take Me Home is a British television drama series which originally aired from 2 to 16 May 1989. The three-part mini-series starred Keith Barron, Maggie O'Neill, Reece Dinsdale and Annette Crosbie. It was created and written by Tony Marchant and was aired on BBC One. The co-lead character, Kathy, was one of the first television roles for actress Maggie O'Neill.

== Plot summary ==
Kathy is a lonely young woman who moved to an extended Midlands town. The fictional industrial town is experiencing major transformation, including residential development, roads, and an advanced computer technology centre (relevant to the era of the broadcast). Kathy encounters a local taxi driver, Tom, who is driven by his passion for engineering and the infusion of technology in the town. Kathy and Tom begin to meet secretly, behind their respective partners' backs.

Their obsessive affair plays out over a backdrop of the social and economic changes of the 1980s in "Thatcherite" Britain. Take Me Home has many scripted references to actual changes in society at the time: notably, the technology encroachments upon industry and skilled labour. Scenes were shot in semi-developed housing estates and corporate business parks. Kathy's husband, Martin (Dinsdale), is written as a progressive computer expert, determined to outstride his corporate peers and succeed whatever the cost. He forces Kathy to have an abortion in the first episode because he feels a baby would harm his career. His colleagues at InfoCo are shown as pompous, arrogant, and chauvinistic.

Tom's home life and marriage with his ditzy wife Liz (Crosbie) is safe, stale, and old-fashioned. They live in a comfortable 1950s council semi. Kathy is needy but attracts Tom through her vibrance and intelligence. He quickly falls in love with her after they finally make love in the back of Tom's taxi. Meanwhile, Martin tries desperately to integrate the couple into their new surroundings. He arranges badminton matches with his colleagues and a dinner party at their exclusive new estate. Tom and Kathy's relationship deteriorates, however, as Tom shows second thoughts about the affair. The affair ends in the last episode when both Liz and Martin discover their spouses' infidelity.

== Cast ==
- Keith Barron as Tom
- Maggie O'Neill as Kathy
- Annette Crosbie as Liz
- Reece Dinsdale as Martin
- Tim Preece as Ray
- Anne Carroll as Joyce

== Production ==
Take Me Home was shot entirely in the Shropshire town Telford, which itself would have been considered a new town in the 1960s, growing and experiencing massive technological and economic changes, much as the town depicted in the series.

== Trivia ==
Tom's character is a fan of Dusty Springfield, and the soundtrack regularly features her recordings. Songs used include "The Look of Love", "Goin' Back", "I Just Don't Know What To Do With Myself" (which closes the final episode), "Wishin' and Hopin'" and "I Only Want To Be With You". Kathy is a fan of Deacon Blue, whose song "The Very Thing", frequently heard in the series, accompanies the closing credits of episodes one and two.
