= Bunn and Co. =

British radio programme, 2003-2004

- Genre: Comedy radio
- Running time: 30 minutes
- Country of origin: United Kingdom
- Language(s): English
- Home station: BBC Radio 4
- Starring: Keith Barron
- Original release: March 2003 – April 2004
- No. of episodes: 11

Bunn and Co. was a radio programme that aired from March 2003 to April 2004. There were 11 half-hour episodes and it was broadcast on BBC Radio 4. It starred Keith Barron.
