= Richard Spence (director) =

British film director and writer (born 1957)

- Born: Richard Crighton Spence; 1957 (age 68–69); Doncaster, West Riding of Yorkshire, U.K.
- Education: Oxford University (M.A.Clas.)
- Occupations: Film director and writer

Richard Crighton Spence (born 1957) is a British film director and writer. He was born in 1957 in Doncaster, West Riding of Yorkshire, England. He received an M.A. in Classics from Oxford University.

== Filmography ==
List of film credits
Year	Title	Credits
1994	Blind Justice	Director
1997	Different for Girls	Director
1999	New World Disorder	Director
1999	Shockers: Deja Vu	Director

== Career awards ==
List of awards
Year	Award	Nomination	Work	Result
1995	British Academy Television Awards	Best Single Drama	Screen Two for episode "Skallagrigg (#10.2)"	Won
1996	Brussels International Independent Film Festival Crystal Star	Best European Feature	Different for Girls	Nominated
1997	Montréal World Film Festival	Grand Prix des Amériques	Different for Girls	Won
