= Out of Hours =

GP focused mini drama series

- Genre: Medical drama
- Written by: Sam Wheats; Amanda Coe; Matthew Hall; Rob Heyland; Timothy Prager
- Directed by: Douglas Mackinnon; Robin Sheppard
- Starring: Lindsey Coulson; John McArdle; Dominic West; Linda Bassett; Toby Jones; Sally Rogers; Nisha K. Nayar; Gabrielle Reidy
- Composer: Julian Nott
- Country of origin: United Kingdom
- Original language: English
- No. of series: 1
- No. of episodes: 6

Production
- Executive producer: Mal Young
- Producers: Simon Passmore; Eileen Quinn
- Cinematography: Grant Cameron
- Editor: Chris Risdale
- Running time: 50 minutes
- Production company: BBC Worldwide

Original release
- Network: BBC One
- Release: 20 May – 24 June 1998

Out of Hours is a six-part British television medical drama series, first broadcast on BBC One on 20 May 1998. Set in the fictional city of Haventry in Birmingham, the series focuses on the lives of three "out of hours" GPs, Dr. Cathy Harding (Lindsey Coulson), Dr. Daniel Laing (John McArdle) and Dr. Paul Featherstone (Dominic West).

For the premiere episode, the Radio Times ran a double-page spread on the series, entitled "the surgery is now closed". A single series comprises six episodes were broadcast, with the concluding episode broadcasting on 24 June 1998. Episodes broadcast at 21:30 on Wednesday nights.

== Casting ==
The series was notable for featuring Dominic West's first television role, having only previously acted in film. West revealed in 2016 during a webchat for The Guardian that for his role as Dr. Paul Featherstone, he was asked to speak in his natural accent after being told that his Birmingham accent was too "comedic".

In a retrospective interview in 1999, Lindsey Coulson said that she liked the concept of the series, which to her was different. She went on to say how the cast (whom she praised) tried to find their footing but couldn't and that there was a lot of potential.

== Cast ==
- Lindsey Coulson as Dr. Cathy Harding
- John McArdle as Dr. Daniel Laing
- Dominic West as Dr. Paul Featherstone
- Linda Bassett as Carol-Anne Kumar
- Toby Jones as Martin Styles
- Sally Rogers as Janine Noonan
- Nisha K. Nayar as Debra Kumar
- Gabrielle Reidy as Roz Vasey
- Inday Ba as Louise Tiffany
- Glenn Cunningham as French Frank
- Matthew Scurfield as Alan Dace

== Episodes ==
| No. | Title | Directed by | Written by | Airdate |
|---|---|---|---|---|
| 1 | TBA | Douglas Mackinnon | Sam Wheats | 20 May 1998 |
| 2 | TBA | Douglas Mackinnon | Amanda Coe | 27 May 1998 |
| 3 | TBA | Douglas Mackinnon | Amanda Coe | 3 June 1998 |
| 4 | TBA | Robin Sheppard | Rob Heyland | 10 June 1998 |
| 5 | TBA | Robin Sheppard | Matthew Hall | 17 June 1998 |
| 6 | TBA | Robin Sheppard | Timothy Prager | 24 June 1998 |

== Home media ==
The series has yet to be released on DVD or VHS.
