= Passer By (film) =

2004 BBC television film

- Title screen
- Written by: Tony Marchant
- Directed by: David Morrissey
- Starring: James Nesbitt; Siobhan Finneran; Emily Bruni; Bryan Dick
- Theme music composer: Dario Marianelli
- Country of origin: United Kingdom

Production
- Producer: David Snodin
- Cinematography: Tim Palmer
- Editor: John Wilson
- Running time: 120 minutes

Original release
- Network: BBC One
- Release: 28 March – 29 March 2004

Passer By is a 2004 British television film broadcast on BBC One in two parts on 28 and 29 March 2004. It was directed by David Morrissey from a script by Tony Marchant and stars James Nesbitt as Joe Keyes, and Emily Bruni as Alice.

== Plot ==
Joe Keys is a man who sees a young woman called Alice accosted by some men on a train one night. Alice looks to Joe for help but he ignores her predicament and gets off the train. A few days later, the police are seeking witnesses to a sexual assault against Alice. Joe unwillingly comes forward but, when giving evidence against the men in court, cannot bring himself to admit that he did nothing to save Alice.

== Production ==
The film was commissioned by the BBC's director of serials Laura Mackie at the outline stage. Marchant did not want to extend the script to any more than two parts because he thought two was the right length. He previously worked with Morrissey and producer David Snodin on the 1997 television series Holding On. The script went through five drafts; refinements included making Joe's wife less judgmental, and seeing other characters in the wider world reacting to Joe. It was filmed over 30 days.

== Reception ==
The first part received 6.9 million viewers, and the second part 6.7 million (28% audience share). The second part was the first time BBC One won the 9–10 p.m. timeslot in two months. Final ratings, accounting for viewers who recorded it to watch later, brought part one up to 7.47 million and part two up to 7.54 million. Passer By received negative critical reaction from the New Statesman.

It was repeated by UKTV Drama on 28 December 2004 as a single feature-length film.
