= The Pool (play) =

2006 play by James Brough and Helen Elizabeth

The Pool (later subtitled City of Culture?) is a play written by and starring James Brough and Helen Elizabeth. The plot follows David (Brough), a Londoner who finds himself stranded in Liverpool, where he meets Tina (Elizabeth). David persuades Tina to take the day off work and the two spend a day in the city together. The play is a mixture of verse and prose. Brough and Elizabeth conceived it while appearing at the 2004 Edinburgh Fringe. They returned to perform it at The Gilded Balloon in 2006. It has also been performed at the Arts Theatre in London and the Unity Theatre in Liverpool. A film adaptation directed by David Morrissey premiered at the 2009 London Film Festival and was broadcast on BBC Two on 7 March 2010.

== Performance history ==
The play premiered at the Edinburgh Fringe in 2006, where Brough and Elizabeth won the Fringe First award for new writing. It transferred to the Arts Theatre in London's West End for a limited run at the end of 2006, before a three-day run from 24 to 27 January 2007 at Liverpool's Unity Theatre. It returned to the Arts Theatre for a three-week run from 3 to 21 April 2007, now subtitled City of Culture?

== Film adaptation ==
Brough and Elizabeth, with David Morrissey, adapted the play into a feature film called Don't Worry About Me after Morrissey saw it at the Arts. Brough and Elizabeth reprise their roles as David and Tina. It was filmed on location in Liverpool in September and October 2007 on a budget of £100,000. Due to Morrissey's acting commitments, editing and other post-production work delayed the film's release. It premiered at the 53rd London Film Festival. After the screening, a distribution deal was signed with the BBC for the film to be shown on television. The film was broadcast on BBC Two on 7 March 2010, and was released on DVD the next day.
