= Rose and Maloney =

Television series

- Genre: Crime drama
- Created by: Bryan Elsley
- Written by: Brian Elsley; Peter Flannery
- Starring: Sarah Lancashire; Phil Davis; Nisha Nayar; Susan Brown; Anne Reid; David Westhead
- Composer: Mark Russell
- Country of origin: United Kingdom
- Original language: English
- No. of series: 3
- No. of episodes: 11

Production
- Executive producers: Bryan Elsley; George Faber
- Producers: Tom Grieves; Catherine Waring
- Cinematography: Tim Palmer; Tony Slater-Ling
- Editor: Annie Kocur
- Camera setup: John Bailie
- Running time: 60–90 minutes
- Production companies: Company Pictures; All3 Media

Original release
- Network: ITV
- Release: 29 September 2002 – 26 September 2005

Rose and Maloney is a British television crime drama series, produced by All3 Media, and broadcast on ITV between 29 September 2002 and 26 September 2005. The series stars Sarah Lancashire and Phil Davis as the principal characters, Rose Linden and Marion Maloney, who are investigators working for the fictional Criminal Justice Review Agency. They take on claims of miscarriages of justice, assessing whether there are grounds to reopen old cases. Rose Linden is portrayed as strong-willed and sometimes reckless, a woman who likes to follow her instincts and play hunches, who often comes into conflict with authority. Marion Maloney, although Rose's superior, usually allows himself to be led by his more passionate colleague. Maloney is by-the-book and a little grey, and he finds working with Rose dangerous but addictively exciting.

Additional cast members include Nisha Nayar, Susan Brown, Anne Reid and David Westhead. Guest stars throughout the series run include Tara Fitzgerald, Danny Dyer, Tiana Benjamin, Andrew-Lee Potts and Neil Dudgeon.

Three series of the programme were broadcast, beginning with a two-part pilot episode on 29 September 2002. Due to strong viewing figures, a second series of six episodes - again, all two-part stories, was commissioned for broadcast in 2004, followed by a third series in 2005. The last series had a slight change to the format, with each episode being self-contained, and the length of each episode extended. ITV chose not to re-commission the show for a fourth series.

The series has never been released on DVD; however, all three series have been released, free-to-view, on YouTube, via the programme's production company, All3 Media.

== Cast ==
- Sarah Lancashire as Rose Linden
- Phil Davis as Marion Maloney
- Nisha Nayar as Joyce Hammond (Series 2―3)
- Susan Brown as Wendy Sillery (Series 1―2)

=== Guest ===
- Andrew Lee Potts as Daniel Berrington (Series 2)
- Stephanie Leonidas as Katie Phelan (Series 2)
- Eamonn Walker as George Parris (Series 2)
- Anne Reid as Bea Linden (Series 2)
- Ramon Vaughan-Williams as Carl Callaghan (Series 3)
- Tara Fitzgerald as Annie Sorensen-Johnson (Series 3)
- Neil Dudgeon as Alan Richmond (Series 3)
- David Westhead as Wallace Canford (Series 3)

== Episodes ==
=== Series 1 (2002) ===
No.	Title	Directed by	Written by	Original release date	Viewers (millions)
1	"Rose and Maloney — Part 1"	Omar Madha	Bryan Elsley	29 September 2002	5.70
After being disgraced, investigator Rose Linden is sent to work under administrative manager Marion Maloney at the Criminal Justice Review Agency. Despite being told to resume light duties only, Rose ignores orders and soon drags Maloney into a case of injustice, involving a mother's plea that her son is not guilty of the rape and murder of his daughter.
2	"Rose and Maloney — Part 2"	Omar Madha	Bryan Elsley	30 September 2002	5.97
As the investigation deepens, Rose is forced to battle with her own demons as she is forced to cope with the knowledge that she has recently freed a man who is actually guilty of the crime for which he was sentenced. Will this impair her judgement, or will Maloney manage to steer the investigation back on course?

=== Series 2 (2004) ===
No.	Title	Directed by	Written by	Original release date	Viewers (millions)
1	"Daniel Berrington — Part 1"	Ferdinand Fairfax	Bryan Elsley	5 July 2004	6.76
Rose receives an appeal from Daniel Berrington, who was found guilty of murdering retired army officer Arthur Towns when he was ten years old. He is now eighteen and eligible for parole, but he risks his chance of freedom by claiming his innocence. Rose once again drags Maloney into the case, which could risk their careers.
2	"Daniel Berrington — Part 2"	Ferdinand Fairfax	Bryan Elsley	6 July 2004	4.77
Daniel escapes from custody, presenting Rose with a difficult dilemma - hand him over to the authorities and save her job, or risk the Agency's future by taking on the case. It's not long before Rose's suspicions are put to the test as the Berrington brothers come face to face, but the truth takes everyone by surprise.
3	"Katie Phelan — Part 1"	Andrew Grieve	Bryan Elsley	12 July 2004	6.20
When the Government orders that cases where the defendants were convicted of infanticide due to evidence from expert witnesses may be reviewed, Rose and Maloney dig up the case of Katie Phelan, who was convicted of killing a baby in her care on the evidence of Dr. Diane Marquis. Rose and Maloney learn that the baby's parents also had another child who died, and they believe that they have a case of cot death, until the family doctor drops a bombshell.
4	"Katie Phelan — Part 2"	Andrew Grieve	Bryan Elsley	13 July 2004	5.30
A series of devastating revelations about the Campeses cause the detective duo to wonder if they've made a terrible mistake in securing Katie's release - could she be the murderer after all?
5	"George Parris — Part 1"	Roger Gartland	Peter Flannery	19 July 2004	6.18
Vincent Parris asks the CJRA to investigate his father's conviction for the murder of a fellow prisoner, after having been the victim of racist remarks. George Parris had already been jailed for armed robbery, but his family believe that the police had framed him for it. As Rose and Maloney delve deeper into the case, someone tries very hard to stop them.
6	"George Parris — Part 2"	Roger Gartland	Peter Flannery	26 July 2004	5.93
When it turns out that the victim was actually an undercover policeman, Rose and Maloney find themselves in a murky world of corruption and racism, which looks to hold the key to the case. But the deeper the pair probe, the more danger they find themselves in.

=== Series 3 (2005) ===
No.	Title	Directed by	Written by	Original release date	Viewers (millions)
1	"Carl Callaghan"	Metin Huseyin	Bryan Elsley	12 September 2005	5.79
Rose and Maloney re-investigate the case of a convicted rapist, but the case gets more complicated when his driving license is found next to a dead body, and later there appear to be implications of drug dealing and people-trafficking.
2	"Annie Johnson"	Metin Huseyin	Peter Flannery	19 September 2005	5.67
Rose and Maloney investigate the case of a woman imprisoned for the murder of her lover's wife and teenage daughter years earlier. The pair must delve into her troubled past in order to correct the miscarriage of justice.
3	"Alan Richmond"	Metin Huseyin	Brian Elslely	26 September 2005	5.75
Rose and Maloney re-investigate the case of a wealthy property developer convicted of murdering his father, sister and business partner on a remote farm. They soon realise that people with power can buy almost anything, but that even the rich don't always escape.
