= Never Never (TV series) =

- Genre: Drama
- Written by: Tony Marchant
- Directed by: Julian Jarrold
- Starring: John Simm; Sophie Okonedo; Adam Kotz; Ruth Sheen; Ellen Thomas; Ashley Walters; Gerard Horan; Michael J. Jackson
- Composer: Adrian Johnston
- Country of origin: United Kingdom
- Original language: English
- No. of series: 1
- No. of episodes: 2

Production
- Executive producer: Lynn Horsford
- Producer: Julia Stannard
- Cinematography: Mark Digby
- Editor: Chris Gill
- Running time: 90 minutes
- Production company: Company Television

Original release
- Network: Channel 4
- Release: 5 November – 6 November 2000

Never Never is a two-part British television drama series, created and written by playwright Tony Marchant and starring John Simm and Sophie Okonedo, that first broadcast on Channel 4 on 5 November 2000.

== Plot ==
The series follows John Parlour (Simm), a loanshark who strikes up a friendship with one of clients, single mum Jo Weller (Okonedo), and decides to leave his past behind and open a credit union to help his former clients out of debt; but his former bosses, who strongly disapprove of the idea, try everything to prevent his business from becoming a success.

== Production ==
Marchant's original notion for the series was not to write about poverty, but to produce something that tackled the modern idea of benign entrepreneurs. 'In a curious kind of way, Richard Branson was the starting point. I was interested in this idea of could businesses be ethical? What exactly was the bottom line?'

'It seemed quite timely to explore the difference between setting things up that are supposed to be for the social good but in turn the conflict between that and the need to be a financially successful entity.'

== Reception ==
The series broadcast over two consecutive nights, with the concluding episode following on 6 November 2000. The first episode drew 2.18 million viewers. The series has yet to be released on DVD, but is available to watch on Channel 4's on-demand streaming service as of September 2025.

The Bella Review gave the series a positive review, writing: "Never Never, a story written by acclaimed playwright Tony Marchant, is essentially about good people doing bad things and vice versa. It's free from any sort of class judgement that might put you off, elegantly letting people be people. Good tension throughout is created by the "will John become a good person with morals and stuff" question – which is, as it should, left unanswered."

They continued; "There's also great acting, supported by the good writing, allowing for heaps of emotions left unspoken yet blatantly obviously present. Even if the narrative is sometimes predictable to seasoned fiction readers and viewers, this production is essentially too in-your-face-honest and charming to disagree with it. That, and John Simm is just a bit too good to do anything wrong."

== Cast ==
- John Simm as John Parlour
- Sophie Okonedo as Jo Weller
- Adam Kotz as Martin
- Ruth Sheen as Sandra
- Ellen Thomas as Brenda
- Ashley Walters as Lee
- Gerard Horan as Dave Bell
- Michael J. Jackson as Bruce Gayle
- Claudie Blakley as Belinda
- Emma Cooke as Carol
- Leo Dolan as Frank
- Jake Nightingale as Bob
- Alex Noodle as Max

== Episodes ==
No.	Title	Directed by	Written by	Original UK air date
1	"Episode 1"	Julian Jarrold	Tony Marchant	5 November 2000
John, a loanshark working for a local loan agency, decides to form a credit union after falling in love with one of his clients, single mum Jo Weller.
2	"Episode 2"	Julian Jarrold	Tony Marchant	6 November 2000
John and Jo work together to try to make the new business venture a success.
