= Different for Girls (film) =

1996 British film

- Theatrical release poster
- Directed by: Richard Spence
- Written by: Tony Marchant
- Produced by: John Chapman; Laura Gregory
- Starring: Rupert Graves; Steven Mackintosh; Miriam Margolyes; Saskia Reeves; Charlotte Coleman; Neil Dudgeon; Nisha K. Nayar; Lia Williams; Ian Dury
- Cinematography: Sean Van Hales
- Edited by: David Gamble
- Music by: Stephen Warbeck
- Production company: BBC Films
- Distributed by: First Look International
- Release dates: 12 September 1997 (US); 10 April 1998 (UK)
- Running time: 96 minutes
- Country: United Kingdom
- Language: English
- Box office: $300,645 (US)

Different for Girls is a 1996 British romantic-comedy film in which one of the protagonists is a transgender woman. The film is directed by Richard Spence and written by Tony Marchant, starring Steven Mackintosh and Rupert Graves.

== Plot ==
Paul Prentice and Karl Foyle were close friends during their secondary school days. Paul used to defend Karl from the violent attacks of their classmates, who ridiculed Karl for being effeminate.

Some years later they are reunited literally by accident, when Paul, on the motorcycle he rides as a courier, runs into the cab that Karl (who has undergone surgery and is named Kim) is riding in. Paul is initially surprised to discover that Karl has become Kim, but asks her out to get re-acquainted.

Their first date goes badly and Kim assumes that it's because Paul is nervous about being seen in public with her. Paul brings her flowers at her workplace (as a verse writer for a greeting card company) and they go out again. This date works out better and they end up back at Paul's place listening to music.

The two continue to spend time together, with Paul teaching Kim how to ride a motorcycle. Their next dinner date, at Kim's place, is disastrous. Paul, struggling to understand transgender issues, drinks too much and ends up in the courtyard outside Kim's apartment, exposing his penis and ranting. The police arrive and arrest him for indecent exposure. Kim places a hand on one of the officers and he arrests her for obstruction. In the police van, one of the officers makes crude remarks about Kim and places his hand under her skirt. Paul intervenes and is beaten by the officer.

At the police station, Paul is charged with assaulting the officer. Kim, his only witness, is terrified of being in trouble and intimidated by the police into keeping silent. She flees to her sister's home.

At Paul's trial on the assault charges, Kim is able to gather her courage and testify for Paul. While he is still convicted, he receives only a token fine. A reporter at the courthouse tries to buy Kim and Paul's story but they refuse. They return to Kim's place, where Paul is surprised and delighted to discover that he and Kim are sexually as well as emotionally compatible; they make love.

Paul, desperate for money following the repossession of his motorcycle, sells Kim's and his story to a London tabloid. With the story splashed all over the papers, Kim thinks she's going to be sacked from the greeting card company. Instead, her boss stands behind her.

As the film draws to a close, it is revealed that Kim and Paul are living together and that it was Kim's idea for Paul to sell the story.

== Cast ==
- Steven Mackintosh as Kim/Karl Foyle
- Rupert Graves as Paul Prentice
- Miriam Margolyes as Pamela
- Saskia Reeves as Jean
- Charlotte Coleman as Alison
- Nisha Nayar as Angela
- Neil Dudgeon as Neil Payne
- Adrian Rawlins as Mike Rendell

== Reception ==
As of August 2025, on the review aggregator website Rotten Tomatoes, the film has a rating of 46%, based on 24 critics reviews.

Leah Rozen from People Magazine wrote the film is an "appealingly off-kilter romantic comedy, and the way this seemingly mismatched pair decide to pair off makes for a small but amusing, and even moving, film about getting on with life and love wherever one finds them." Bob Satuloff of The Advocate observed that the director "builds the repressed eroticism of the reconfigured relationship to a simmering eleventh-hour love scene, and it's refreshing to see a screen transsexual who doesn't lip-sync I Will Survive to establish her credentials." He also thought the evolution of the couple from misfits to a postmodern Cary Grant and Deborah Kerr "may strain credulity". Overall, he concluded that "although the lovers are identified as heterosexual, it's two men up there on the screen kissing, having sex, and falling in love."

American film critic Owen Gleiberman said "it takes a handsome man to make a beautiful woman, and Steven Mackintosh, who plays Kim, is the rare gender-bending performer who is neither gaudy nor comic but gently, quietly sexy." He further states that "when the big seduction scene finally arrives, it's hard to deny the shock value, yet the storytelling has so little imaginative energy that only then does it become clear you've been watching a kind of featherweight knockoff of The Crying Game. C.S. O'Brien from Video Business offered praise, saying the film "is a no-holds-barred romp that refuses to pull a punch, and this is just the sort of oddball romantic comedy that the British network does best." He also thought "Mackintosh is touching and effective as a new woman, while Graves is believable as a simple guy succumbing to taboo desires." He concludes that the movie is "sensitive, tough and even shocking, and is recommended for adult audiences interested in its offbeat subject matter."

Andy Medhurst wrote in Sight and Sound that this movie is "smart, moving, witty and brave; this transsexual My Beautiful Laundrette is one of the best British films of the decade." He does note though "it isn't flawless – some of its peripheral participants and subplots are only hazily sketched in – but it takes risks, breaks new ground and tickles the heart and mind in equal measure." He also complimented the writer for "giving its nonconformist heroes a 100 per cent, rose-coloured happy ending; rarely has 'normality' been made to look so drab, cramped and compromised, which makes this a "film to be treasured." Carolyn Kraus suggests in GLBTQ Arts that it wasn't until the "late 1990s, with small budget films like this one, do we get reliable information about transsexuality delivered by insiders in drama." Kraus said that "Kim's story has a happy ending as she refuses to be rejected or abused."

Film critic Kenneth Turan opined that "its plot, direction and writing have the slapdash quality of mid-range British TV dramas, for which the film's creators have done considerable work, but there's an exceptional performance, a memorable character at the center of things that makes that forgiveness worth the effort." He concludes that "the initial sections of the film, with Prentice and Kim tentatively renewing their friendship, trying to decide if it's worth their time to surmount the inevitable awkwardness, are the film's most satisfying." Liam Lacey of The Globe and Mail observed that "the story has a TV movie shorthand calculation and slightness, and there's also lots of information, served up as dialogue, about transsexuality, which makes the movie feel like some sort of training film." Author Susan Isaacs offered that "although the movie does have humor, it treats the subject of transsexuality with such high seriousness that it does not achieve the buoyancy usually associated with romantic comedy."

== Awards ==
The movie won the Grand Prix of the Americas Award at the 1996 Montreal World Film Festival, and Steven Mackintosh won Best Actor at the 1997 Brussels International Film Festival.

== See also ==
- Boy Meets Girl
- Transamerica
- List of feature films with transgender characters
- List of LGBTQ-related films
