= Big Bad World (1999 TV series) =

British TV comedy-drama series (1999–2001)

- Genre: Comedy drama
- Created by: Nicholas Martin
- Written by: Nicholas Martin
- Starring: Ardal O'Hanlon; Beth Goddard; Steve Nicolson; Emma Fielding; Mick Ford; Nisha Nayar; George Wickes; Matthew Valaitis; Thelma Whiteley; Lucy Punch
- Composer: Hal Lindes
- Country of origin: United Kingdom
- Original language: English
- No. of series: 3
- No. of episodes: 16

Production
- Executive producers: Rob Pursey; Jonathan Powell
- Producers: Sarah Wilson; Rob Pursey
- Production locations: Watford, Hertfordshire, England, UK
- Running time: 52 minutes (Series 1); 25 minutes (Series 2–3)
- Production companies: Central Independent Television (1999); Carlton Television (2001)

Original release
- Network: ITV
- Release: 20 June 1999 – 15 October 2001

Big Bad World is a British comedy-drama series written and created by Nicholas Martin, following the misadventures of an Irish expat named Eamon Donaghy (played by Father Ted's Ardal O'Hanlon) as he awkwardly navigates his thirties and dating in London. The series originally aired on ITV for running for 16 episodes across three seasons between 20 June 1999 and 15 October 2001. The show was originally produced by Central Independent Television in the first series and followed by Carlton Television in the last two series. It chronicled the relatable, sometimes painful friction of transitioning into full adulthood, contrasting Eamon's wild single lifestyle with his close friends Patrick and Beatrice Dempsey (played by Steve Nicolson and Emma Fielding), who were busy dealing with a young family and suburban responsibilities.

== Plot ==
The series centres around two single people terrified of remaining unmarried forever, and desperate to find love. They want to experience those life's ups and down's that married couples go through.

== Cast ==
- Ardal O'Hanlon as Eamon Donaghy
- Beth Goddard as Kath Shand
- Steve Nicolson as Patrick Dempsey
- Emma Fielding as Beatrice Dempsey
- Mick Ford as Stuart
- Nisha Nayar as Stephanie
- George Wickes/Scott Wickes as Sean Dempsey
- Matthew Valaitis/Daniel Valaitis as Brendon Dempsey
- Thelma Whiteley as Hilary Shand
- Lucy Punch as Melissa

== Episodes ==
=== Series overview ===
Series	Episodes	Originally released	
Series	Episodes	First released	Last released
1	6	20 June 1999	25 July 1999
2	4	19 January 2001	9 February 2001
3	6	3 September 2001	15 October 2001

=== Series 1 (1999) ===
Episodes aired on ITV on Sundays at 21:30.

No. overall	No. in series	Title	Directed by	Written by	Original release date	Viewers (millions)
1	1	"She's a Lovely Girl"	Udayan Prasad	Nicholas Martin	20 June 1999	5.36m
Eamon invites a colleague to dinner with his married friends, but things do not run according to plan, leading his friends to encourage him to visit a prostitute.
2	2	"Don't Shoot the Cows!"	Udayan Prasad	Nicholas Martin	27 June 1999	Under 5.15m
Patrick and Beatrice's plans for a romantic weekend away are thrown into chaos.
3	3	"What's Wrong with Bees?"	Piers Haggard	Nicholas Martin	4 July 1999	5.49m
Eamon signs up for a dating service, while Kath embarks on an affair with a beekeeper.
4	4	"Be Nice to Posh People"	Piers Haggard	Nicholas Martin	11 July 1999	5.54m
Kath and Eamon have to fight off a pair of keen new friends.
5	5	"Happy Nappy"	Sandy Johnson	Nicholas Martin	18 July 1999	Under 4.98m
Kath and Eamon are recruited as babysitters.
6	6	"Don't Shred My Rabbit!"	Sandy Johnson	Nicholas Martin	25 July 1999	5.57m
Kath and Eamon arrange to go on a date. Patrick discovers his junior at work has a crush on him.

=== Series 2 (2001) ===
Episodes aired on ITV on Fridays at 22:00.

No. overall	No. in series	Title	Directed by	Written by	Original release date	Viewers (millions)
7	1	"Carp!"	Philippa Langdale	Nicholas Martin	19 January 2001	Under 6.22m
Eamon returns from New York to house-sit for Pat and Beeatrice.
8	2	"Carping On"	Philippa Langdale	Nicholas Martin	26 January 2001	Under 6.16m
Kath is forced to take a job as a parking attendant. Eamon boosts his career at the magazine by getting socialite Tamara Beckwith to pose on the cover with a carp.
9	3	"Tory Girl"	Roger Gartland	Nicholas Martin	2 February 2001	Under 5.74m
Eamon meets Alice, a fervent Conservative, who soon realises politics is not the only thing dividing them.
10	4	"She's Having a Baby"	Roger Gartland	Nicholas Martin	9 February 2001	Under 6.10m
Eamon and Kath clash in the kitchen when both plan to hold important dinner dates. Zandra lumbers Eamon with the task of turning around the fortunes of a minority-interest magazine called 'We're Having a Baby', and sends him off to interview London's most radical mother to witness her natural-birth ritual.

=== Series 3 (2001) ===
Episodes aired on ITV1 on Mondays at 22:50.

No. overall	No. in series	Title	Directed by	Written by	Original release date	Viewers (millions)
11	1	"Episode 1"	Justin Chadwick	Nicholas Martin	3 September 2001	Under 4.45m
TBA.
12	2	"Episode 2"	Justin Chadwick	Nicholas Martin	10 September 2001	Under 4.21m
TBA.
13	3	"Episode 3"	Philippa Langdale	Nicholas Martin	17 September 2001	Under 4.50m
TBA.
14	4	"Episode 4"	Susan Tully	Nicholas Martin	24 September 2001	Under 4.40m
TBA.
15	5	"Episode 5"	Susan Tully	Nicholas Martin	1 October 2001	Under 4.36m
TBA.
16	6	"Episode 6"	Susan Tully	Nicholas Martin	15 October 2001	Under 4.87m
TBA.

== Critical reception ==
ITV has pulled comedy drama Big Bad World from its Friday night schedule after only four episodes due to the show's poor ratings.

The Carlton show, which was being beaten in the ratings by BBC1's Clive Anderson Now and Channel 4's So Graham Norton, is to be replaced this Friday at 10.30pm by ITV regional programming.

Big Bad World, which is a Cold Feet-esque thirtysomething comedy drama starring Ardal O'Hanlon and Beth Goddard, has averaged just 3.1m and an 18% share since debuting on Friday night on January 19.

The second series of the show started out at 10pm, before being moved back to 10.30pm in its second week.

"This is a commercial channel," said an ITV spokeswoman. "There's still a lot of trial and experiment with the new schedule. Big Bad World wasn't doing as well as it could have done."

The spokeswoman added that the remaining six episodes of the comedy drama will be broadcast, though they have not yet been rescheduled.

== Home media ==
The complete first series was released on VHS on 11 September 2000 by Carlton Video and the second series was released on VHS on 19 March 2001 as well, but has never been issued on DVD in the United Kingdom.
