= Tony Marchant (playwright) =

British playwright and television dramatist

- Born: 11 July 1959 (age 67); East London, UK
- Occupations: Screenwriter, Playwright

Tony Marchant (born 11 July 1959) is a British playwright and television dramatist. In 1982 he won the London Critics' Theatre Award for Most Promising Playwright for The Lucky Ones and Raspberry. In 1999 he won the British Academy Television Awards Dennis Potter Award for services to television. His television work includes the acclaimed Holding On (1997), Never Never, starring John Simm, and Take Me Home.

== Early life ==
Marchant, whose father was a printer and mother a school dinner lady, was born and raised on a council estate in Wapping in the East End of London, which he has described as "a very hard, heavy place to live sometimes". He has stated that, while estates have changed since he grew up on one, the poverty hasn't gone away. He was educated at St Joseph's Academy, Blackheath, and went on to become a London boxing champion and a member of the England boxing squad.

Inspired by "the DIY ethic of the Jam and the Clash", he got his start in writing at the age of 18, when a selection of poems he had submitted to Riot Stories, an imprint established by Jam musician Paul Weller, were published.

== Life and career ==
=== 1980s ===
His big break came in 1980, when his first play Remember Me?, which he had submitted to 20 theatres, was accepted and staged by the Theatre Royal Stratford East in London, an experience which he likens to winning the lottery. It was at this point that he ceased pursuing a career in heavyweight professional boxing, although, "getting punched in the face," was, he has claimed, "very good preparation for being a writer."

His second play London Calling, which took its name from a song by the Clash, was combined with Dealt With for the double bill Thick As Thieves, produced at the Theatre Royal Stratford East's The Square Thing studio theatre in 1981. Looking back on his early career he has stated that at the time he wondered if he were part of, "some sort of liberal social engineering," which advantaged him as an ex-boxer from a council estate with no university education.

His next two productions, Stiff and Raspberry, were put on at the Soho Poly in 1982. That same year The Lucky Ones was staged at the Theatre Royal Stratford East and later re-staged at Islington's The Old Red Lion in 1986. These productions won him the London Critics' Theatre Award for Most Promising Playwright that year.

Welcome Home, Marchant's play about a squad of Falkland War veteran paratroopers meeting up to act as pall-bearers for one of their squad killed in the war, debuted at Hemel Hempstead's Old Town Hall Arts Centre before being taken on a nationwide tour by Paines Plough which concluded at the Royal Court Theatre in 1983. It was later re-staged at The Old Red Lion in 1989.

BBC Television's production of Raspberry in 1984 gave Marchant his break in television. He credits the smooth transition that he and his generation had into screenwriting to the vogue for televised plays during these decades.

Straddling theatre and television with Lazydays Ltd., produced at the Theatre Royal Stratford East in 1986, followed by London Weekend Television's broadcast of The Moneymen in 1987, he has stated a preference for the theatre due to the feedback from a live audience, but his survival in the industry has been credited to his move to television.

Marchant's final theatrical works to date consisted of The Attractions produced at Soho Poly, which was published by Amber Lane Press the following year, Marty Cruickshank produced at the Royal Court Theatre's Theatre Upstairs, and Speculators produced by the Royal Shakespeare Company at the Barbican Centre's The Pit, all in 1987.

The BBC Television productions of Death of a Son for Screen Two, The Attractions for Screenplay, and the three-part miniseries Take Me Home, marked his permanent move into television in 1989.

=== 1990s ===
Methuen Drama, an imprint of Bloomsbury Publishing, released a compilation volume, consisting of the scripts for Welcome Home, Raspberry and The Lucky Ones in 1996.

He has also written the comedy film Different for Girls.

=== 2000s ===
He appeared on University Challenge (BBC Two) in a special actors-versus-writers episode in January 2006.

He was featured in the writers section of the Broadcast magazine Hot 100 2006.

In 2007 he wrote an ITV series, Whistleblowers, for ITV, and an award-winning single film, Mark of Cain for C4.

In 2008, David Tennant starred in a BBC1 single film, Recovery, in which Marchant explored the aftermath of brain injury on a man's life and family.

In 2009 he wrote the teleplay for the CBC Television movie Diverted starring British actor David Suchet and Canadian actor Shawn Ashmore. This drama centred on the impact the September 11th, 2001 terrorist attacks had on the town of Gander, Newfoundland as hundreds of flights were forced to land outside American airspace.

=== 2010s ===
He wrote episodes for all 3 series of Garrow's Law, the film The Dig and, broadcast in 2012, the hard-hitting drama about the British probation service Public Enemies, all for BBC1.

== Honours and awards ==
Marchant received an Honorary Doctor of Letters from the University of Hertfordshire during a ceremony at the Cathedral and Abbey Church of St Alban on November 16, 2011. This was awarded, according to the university, "in recognition of his commitment to creative ambition and integrity in British drama."

He was resident writer at the Royal National Theatre.

== Film and television credits ==
Film/Series	Production Company	Years	Functioned as			Notes
Film/Series	Production Company	Years	Writer	Producer	Details	Notes
Raspberry	BBC One	1984	Yes	No		TV film
Summer Season	BBC Television	1985	Yes	No		One Episode - Reservations
The Moneymen	LWT	1987	Yes	No		TV film
Screen Two: Death of a Son	BBC Two	1989	Yes	No		TV film
Take Me Home	BBC One	1989	Yes	No		Three-part mini-series
ScreenPlay: The Attractions	BBC Two	1989	Yes	No		TV film
Goodbye Cruel World	BBC Two	1992	Yes	No		Three-part mini-series
Lovejoy	BBC One	1993	Yes	No		One Episode - God Helps Those
Stages: Speaking in Tongues	BBC Two	1994	Yes	No		TV film
Different for Girls	BBC Films	1996	Yes	No		Theatrical film
Into the Fire	BBC Television	1996	Yes	No		Three-part mini-series
Holding On	BBC Two	1997	Yes	No		Eight-part mini-series
Bad Blood	ITV	1999	Yes	No		TV film
Great Expectations	BBC One	1999	Yes	No		TV film
Kid in the Corner	Channel 4	1999	Yes	No		Three-part mini-series
Never Never	Channel 4	2000	Yes	No		TV film
Swallow	Channel 4	2001	Yes	No		Three-part mini-series
Crime and Punishment	BBC Two	2002	Yes	No		TV film
The Canterbury Tales	BBC One	2003	Yes	No		One episode - The Knight's Tale
Passer By	BBC One	2004	Yes	No		TV film
The Family Man	BBC One	2006	Yes	No		TV film
The Mark of Cain	Channel 4	2007	Yes	No		TV film
Recovery	BBC One	2007	Yes	No		TV film
The Whistleblowers	ITV	2007	Yes	Yes	Creator & executive producer	Various episodes
Diverted	CBC Television	2009	Yes	No		TV film
Garrow's Law	BBC One	2009-2011	Yes	Yes	Co-creator & associate producer	Various episodes
Postcode	CBBC	2011	Yes	No		Three-part mini-series
Public Enemies	BBC One	2012	Yes	No		Three-part mini-series
Leaving	ITV	2012	Yes	No		Three-part mini-series
The Secret Agent	BBC One	2016	Yes	Yes	Executive producer	Three-part mini-series
Butterfly	ITV	2018	Yes	No		Three-part mini-series
Grace	ITV	2024	Yes	No		One Episode
