= OSO Arts Centre =

Arts venue in London, England

- The Old Sorting Office
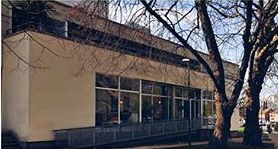
- OSO Arts Centre, Barnes Green
- Interactive map of OSO Arts Centre
- Address: 49 Station Road, Barnes; London, SW13 0LF; England, United Kingdom
- Coordinates: 51.4723°N 0.2465°W
- Capacity: 130 seats
- Type: Fringe theatre
- Current use: Theatre and arts centre
- Public transit: Barnes Barnes Bridge

Construction
- Opened: 2002; 24 years ago
- Years active: 2002–present

Website
- osoarts.org.uk

The OSO Arts Centre is a 130-seat theatre located in Barnes in the London Borough of Richmond upon Thames. The building was previously Barnes' postal sorting office, but was redeveloped into a mixture of residential and commercial space with the first residents arriving in 1999. In 2002 the arts centre opened and in 2012 the OSO Arts Centre came under the direction of a new board of trustees. The building is located on Barnes Green, and provides arts services to the community, both in the form of evening performances in the theatre space, and daytime dance and art classes. Some well-known names have performed at the OSO over the years including Patricia Hodge, Timothy West, Stephanie Cole, Julian Glover, Janie Dee, Issy van Randwyck, Harriet Thorpe, Lee Nelson and Robert Pattinson.

The theatre is currently led by Artistic Director Lydia Sax and General Manager Lisa Ross. Its artistic ambassadors include Gyles Brandreth, Roger McGough and Kate Silverton.

During the Covid-19 pandemic in 2020 the theatre space was refurbished as a 'Crisis Kitchen', with the OSO staff and volunteers preparing over 10,000 free meals for the elderly and vulnerable, NHS workers, and those in economic hardship. The chair of trustees was appointed MBE in the 2021 New Years Honours list for this initiative.

A full refurbishment of the venue, designed by B3 Designers, was completed in autumn 2020. The refurbished theatre was officially opened by Michael Ball in October 2020.
