= Holding On (TV series) =

British TV series

- DVD cover
- Genre: Drama
- Created by: Tony Marchant
- Written by: Tony Marchant
- Directed by: Adrian Shergold
- Starring: David Morrissey; Phil Daniels; Lesley Manville; Saira Todd; Ace Bhatti; Ellen Thomas; Freddie Annobil-Dodoo; Caroline Harker; Diane Parish; Sandra Voe; Rachel Power
- Composer: Nick Bicat
- Country of origin: United Kingdom
- Original language: English
- No. of series: 1
- No. of episodes: 8

Production
- Executive producers: Michael Wearing; Kevin Loader
- Producer: David Snodin
- Cinematography: Peter Middleton
- Editor: John Stothart
- Running time: 55 minutes

Original release
- Network: BBC2
- Release: 2 September – 21 October 1997

Holding On is an eight-part British television drama series, created by screenwriter Tony Marchant, that first broadcast on BBC2 on 8 September 1997. The series follows the life of a seemingly unconnected group of people living in London, whose lives are strangely affected by the murder of a young woman in the city. While some of the group are able to take a newfound hope from the remains of the tragic event, others including food critic Gary Rickey (Phil Daniels) simply watch on as despair begins to unravel in the light of the aftermath. Proving popular with both critics and viewers alike, the series won a Royal Television Society award for Best Drama Serial in 1998.

The series boasted a stellar cast, including David Morrissey, Lesley Manville and Ellen Thomas, as well as Ace Bhatti and Diane Parish, who were both relatively unknown at the time of the series' broadcast. The series was billed as Marchant's "first significant project for television", and its main themes as "exploring in complex detail the personal responsibility [of every individual], and how it becomes threatened in a society which has been told by Margaret Thatcher [that] it no longer exists." The series was first released on DVD on 1 August 2005. After many years of being out-of-print, the series was finally re-released by Simply Media on 9 November 2015. Following the DVD release, the series drew comparisons to American drama series The Wire, praising the similarities been the multi-layered complex storylines and character development.

== Cast ==
=== Main cast ===
- David Morrissey as Shaun
- Phil Daniels as Gary Rickey
- Lesley Manville as Hilary
- Saira Todd as Claire
- Freddie Annobil-Dodoo as Marcus
- Sam Kelly as Bernard
- Razaaq Adoti as Chris
- Diane Parish as Janet
- Ellen Thomas as Florrie
- Treva Etienne as Lloyd
- Annette Badland as Brenda

=== Supporting cast ===
- Ace Bhatti as Zahid
- Caroline Harker as Vicky
- Sandra Voe as Annie
- Rachel Power as Helen
- Emily Hamilton as Tina
- Meera Syal as Zita
- David Calder as Werner
- Frances Shergold as Frances
- Tim Woodward as Ken
- Tilly Vosburgh as Gabby

== Episodes ==
No.	Title	Directed by	Written by	British air date
1	"Episode 1"	Adrian Shergold	Tony Marchant	2 September 1997
A bulimic restaurant critic struggles with his job, Marcus sets up Massive FM, and a young woman is murdered in a telephone kiosk.
2	"Episode 2"	Adrian Shergold	Tony Marchant	9 September 1997
The telephone kiosk murder has far-reaching effects on the lives of others, while it seems tax investigator Shaun may have something to hide. Chris cons money out of his mother.
3	"Episode 3"	Adrian Shergold	Tony Marchant	16 September 1997
Taxi driver Bernard cracks under the pressure of witnessing the murder, and kills a passenger himself.
4	"Episode 4"	Adrian Shergold	Tony Marchant	23 September 1997
Claire seeks out the mother of her sister's killer, and Bernard is charged with murder. Marcus and Janet find it difficult to continue with the radio station.
5	"Episode 5"	Adrian Shergold	Tony Marchant	30 September 1997
Marcus and Janet try to pursue their radio activities, Hilary is the subject of a mugging, and Shaun accepts a bribe.
6	"Episode 6"	Adrian Shergold	Tony Marchant	7 October 1997
Disaster at a dinner party threatens Hilary and Lloyd's relationship. After Chris' funeral, Marcus relaunches Massive FM.
7	"Episode 7"	Adrian Shergold	Tony Marchant	14 October 1997
Pregnant Claire takes in an embarrassing flatmate, and Florrie and Janet are outraged by Bernard's seemingly lenient prison sentence. Shaun's life is in tatters, and Hilary makes a decision about her relationship with Lloyd.
8	"Episode 8"	Adrian Shergold	Tony Marchant	21 October 1997
Gary returns to his football reporting roots, Brenda reveals to Claire why she is on the run, and Shaun becomes a victim of the city's random violence.
