= Grade II listed buildings in Liverpool-L13 =

Liverpool is a city and port in Merseyside, England, which contains many listed buildings. A listed building is a structure designated by English Heritage of being of architectural and/or of historical importance and, as such, is included in the National Heritage List for England. There are three grades of listing, according to the degree of importance of the structure. Grade I includes those buildings that are of "exceptional interest, sometimes considered to be internationally important"; the buildings in Grade II* are "particularly important buildings of more than special interest"; and those in Grade II are "nationally important and of special interest". Very few buildings are included in Grade I — only 2.5% of the total. Grade II* buildings represent 5.5% of the total, while the great majority, 92%, are included in Grade II.

Liverpool contains more than 1,550 listed buildings, of which 28 are in Grade I, 109 in Grade II*, and the rest in Grade II. (Note: These figures are taken from a search in the National Heritage List for England in May 2013, and are subject to variation as further buildings are listed, grades are revised, or buildings are delisted.) This list contains the Grade II listed buildings in the L13 postal district of Liverpool. The district is residential, containing suburbs of the city, including parts of Old Swan, Tuebrook and Stoneycroft. The listed buildings include houses, banks, churches and associated structures, a drinking fountain, and a library.

Grade II listed buildings from other areas in the city can be found through the box on the right, along with the lists of the Grade I and Grade II* buildings in the city.

== Buildings ==
Name	Location	Photograph	Built	Notes
May Place	Broad Green Road; 53.4115°N 2.9118°W		18th century	The house was present on a map dated 1768. Initially a merchant's house, then converted for use as a convent, and later became St Vincent's Hospice. The hospice closed in 1990, and the building has been converted into accommodation for those needing extra care. The house is built in brick with stone dressings and a slate roof. It has two storeys, a basement and an attic, and a front of five bays. The middle three bays project forward under a pediment. The central Doric porch also has a pediment, and a balustrade and statue.
Moss Cottage	75 Derby Lane; 53.41943°N 2.91526°W		18th century (probable)	A roughcast house with a slate roof, in two low storeys with a three-bay front. One of the windows is a paired sash, the others are casements.
St Cecilia's Church	Green Lane; 53.4238°N 2.9282°W		1930	A Roman Catholic church designed by Ernest Bower Norris in Italian Romanesque style. It is built in red brick with dressings in Portland stone and concrete, and a pantile roof. The church consists of a nave with transepts at the west and east ends, aisles, a north vestry and projection for confessionals, and a deep sanctuary. At the west end is a central round-headed recess containing an entrance and a window, and above the doorway is a statue of Saint Cecilia. Flanking the recess are octagonal turrets linked at the top by a blind arcade and a pediment.
Lister Drive Library	Green Lane; 53.4205°N 2.9258°W		1904–05	The library was designed by Thomas Shelmerdine. It is built in brick with stone dressings and a slate roof, and is in a single storey. The library has four bays on each side, with a canted bay between them. The windows are mullioned and transomed. On one corner is an octagonal turret, with buttresses and an arcaded parapet. At the entrance is an Ionic porch with a frieze and a pediment.
Walls and gate piers, Lister Drive Library	Green Lane; 53.42089°N 2.92601°W		1904–05	The wall and gate piers were designed by Thomas Shelmerdine. The walls are in brick, passing along Green Lane and Lister Drive, with the gateway at the corner. On the piers are hemi-spherical caps.
Bowden Fountain	Mill Bank; 53.42725°N 2.91880°W		1911	The drinking fountain is made in stone and has a square plan with diagonal buttresses. On two sides are oval bowls. At the top is a cornice and a bronze lantern. There are also two inscribed bronze plaques.
St Anne’s Church	Prescot Road53.415921°N 2.924143°W		1889-91	Church of England parish church, built of red Woolton stone in Victorian Gothic style; endowed by TF Harrison of the Harrison shipping line in memory of his father, Thomas Harrison.
Barclays Bank	521 Prescot Road; 53.4138°N 2.9138°W		c. 1905 (probable)	The bank stands on a corner, and has an L-shaped plan. It was designed by Grayson and Ould, and is built in red brick with stone dressings and a slate roof. The bank has three storeys with an octagonal turret and cupola on the corner. Other features include shaped gables, oriel windows, and an entrance with an Ionic aedicule with pilasters and an open pediment.
Basil Grange	Queen's Drive; 53.4248°N 2.9145°W		1880	A stone house with a slate roof, it has two storeys and a basement, and a front of seven bays. Some of the bays project forward and are gabled. The windows are mullioned and transomed. The porch is in the sixth bay, and it leads to a Tudor arched entrance. At the rear of the house is a tower with an embattled parapet.
Basil Grange Lodge	Queen's Drive; 53.42444°N 2.91497°W		Mid 19th century	The lodge is in stone with a slate roof. It has a single storey, and an L-shaped plan. There are two bay windows with entablatures and pediments above. The windows are sashes under round heads. The porch is in the angle and has iron fluted columns with Egyptian capitals.
Gates adjoining Basil Grange Lodge	Queen's Drive; 53.42429°N 2.91515°W		Mid 19th century	This consists of six stone gate piers with panels and dentiled cornices. At one side is a curved flanking wall. The gates are no longer present.
Gwalia	Queen's Drive; 53.4238°N 2.9143°W		1851	The house was originally called Sandfield Tower. It is built in stone with a slate roof, and is in two storeys with a front of five bays. The first bay is recessed and the next three bays project forward. Arising from the second bay is a tower with angle pilasters, a frieze, a cornice, and a pierced balustrade. By the end of the 20th century the house had been damaged by fire and become derelict.
Mortuary house	Snaefell Avenue; 53.42441°N 2.93026°W		c. 1870	The mortuary house stands in the northwest corner of the vicarage of the Church of Saint John the Baptist, and was probably designed by G. F. Bodley. It is built in stone, and has a parapet and a slate roof. On the sides are coped gables, one of which contains a blank shield in a panel.
Nelson Monument	Springfield Park; 53°25′06″N 02°53′54″W		circa 1805	Erected to the memory of Admiral Lord Nelson
Convent of Mercy	St Oswald's Street; 53.4118°N 2.9147°W		c. 1855	The convent consists of a group of buildings around a courtyard. They are built in sandstone with slate roofs, and are in one and two storeys. The convent itself is small, containing only eight cells, and there is a small chapel on the first floor.
St Oswald's Church	St Oswald's Street; 53.4120°N 2.9141°W		c. 1840–42	This Roman Catholic church was designed by A. W. N. Pugin but only his steeple remains, the body of the church having been rebuilt in 1951–57 by Adrian Gilbert Scott. The steeple is built in red sandstone, and the body of the church is in brick, other than the west front, which is in stone. Inside the church are hyperbolic concrete arches, and a multi-coloured marble baldacchino.
St Oswald's Presbytery	St Oswald's Street; 53.4117°N 2.9141°W		1857	The presbytery was designed by E. W. Pugin. It is built in stone with a slate roof. The presbytery has two storeys, and a front of four bays. The end bays project forward, the first bay under a gable, the fourth bay with a bay window under a hipped roof. Above the entrance is a niche containing a statue of Saint Oswald.
St Oswald's School	St Oswald's Street; 53.4117°N 2.9150°W		c. 1855	This originated as a school, possibly designed by A. W. N. Pugin. It is built in sandstone with a slate roof, has two storeys, and is in a T-shaped plan, with a front of seven bays. It was later converted for use as a youth centre.
Vicarage, Church of Saint John the Baptist	West Derby Road; 53.4245°N 2.9297°W		1890	The vicarage was designed by G. F. Bodley. It is built in grey brick with red brick bands and red sandstone dressings, and has a tiled roof. Its front is in four bays, the first bay being recessed with two storeys; the other bays have three storeys. The windows are mullioned and transomed. In the third bay is an elliptical-headed entrance.
—	340–352 West Derby Road; 53.4255°N 2.9281°W		1840s	A symmetrical terrace of seven brick houses with stone dressings and a slate roof. They are in two storeys with basements, and each house is in three bays. The central and the end houses project forward, the end houses having pediments. Along the top of the buildings is a cornice. Most of the windows are sashes, the entrances have angle pilasters and entablatures, and some of the houses have first floor iron balconies.
—	354 West Derby Road; 53.42565°N 2.92738°W		18th century	The house has two storeys, the ground floor and the right side being built in stone, the rest in brick with stone quoins. It has a front of two bays, and the windows are three-light sliding sashes.
Barclays Bank	611 West Derby Road; 53.42522°N 2.93066°W		c. 1910	This originated as a branch of the Bank of Liverpool, and was possibly designed by James Francis Doyle. It has two storeys and an attic, the ground floor being in rusticated stone, and the upper floor in brick, above which is a slate mansard roof. There are three bays on West Derby Road, four on Victoria Road, and another bay at the corner. This has an entrance flanked by Doric columns, a convex entablature, over which is a carved Liver bird, and a round window in the attic.

== See also ==
Architecture of Liverpool

== References and notes ==
Notes

Citations

Sources

- Pollard, Richard; Pevsner, Nikolaus (2006), Lancashire: Liverpool and the South-West, The Buildings of England, New Haven and London: Yale University Press, ISBN 0-300-10910-5
