= MV Mairangi Bay =

Container ship

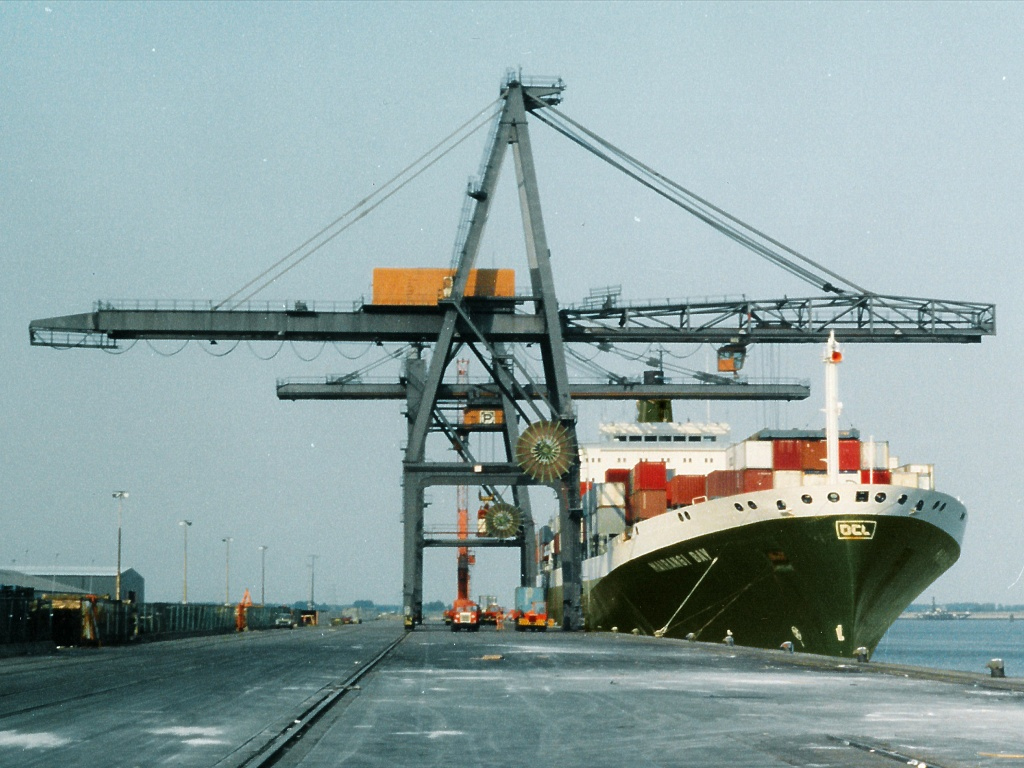
Mairangi Bay at Vlissingen, Netherlands

MV Mairangi Bay was a container ship owned by Overseas Containers Limited (OCL). It was named after the suburb of Mairangi Bay in Auckland, New Zealand.

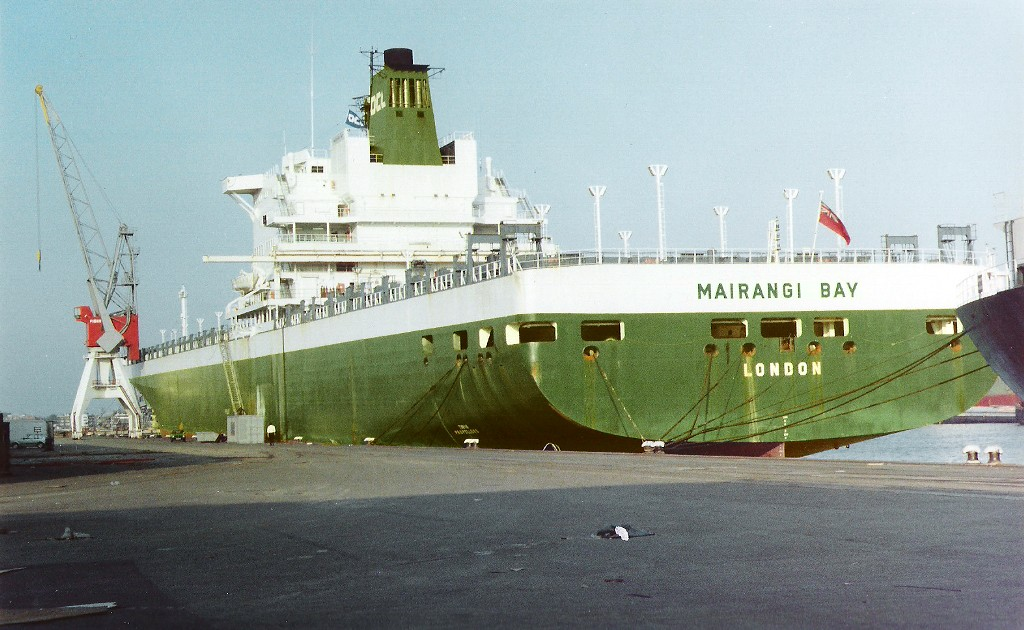
MV Mairagni Bay

== History ==
MV Mairangi Bay was launched on 9 January 1978 and completed for OCL on 28 April 1978. The ship was one of two identical sisters built by Bremer Vulkan shipyard in West Germany, the other being the MV Resolution Bay. A third ship - the New Zealand Pacific - operated by The New Zealand Shipping Corporation, was save in minor details, identical to the two Bay ships. Owner OCL was to later become P&O Containers, which itself merged with Nedlloyd Lines to become P&O Nedlloyd. Mairangi Bay operated for all three entities, mainly on the United Kingdom/Europe to Australia/New Zealand route.

Mairangi Bay was scrapped in 2002 at Shanghai, China.

In 2002 P&O Nedlloyd named a new ship P&O Mairangi (IMO 9244881, later renamed Maersk Denton, MSC Marbella, Santa Rufina then MSC Arushi R.

== Statistics ==
Mairangi Bay had a tonnage of 43,995 gross register tons (GRT) and a top speed of 23 knots (43 km/h; 26 mph). The ship's length was 248.6 metres (815 ft 7 in), and had a beam of 32.3 m (106 ft 0 in). She was propelled by two eight-cylinder two-stroke slow-speed crosshead diesel engines with a total power output of 53,280 brake horsepower (39,730 kW). The MAN engines, model KS8Z90/160A, had a 900 mm (35 in) bore and 1,600 mm (63 in) stroke. They were each directly coupled to one of the two propeller shafts, turning them at a maximum 122 rpm. Auxiliary power was provided by five 1,500 kW MaK medium-speed diesel alternators. She could carry 2,344 twenty-foot equivalent units (TEU) of containers, 1,223 of them refrigerated (reefer) containers in holds below deck. The reefer capacity was one of the largest of any ship at the time, and the containers when loaded in the holds were connected to the ship's brine circulation system for cooling. The brine was cooled by a large refrigeration plant located in the engine room.

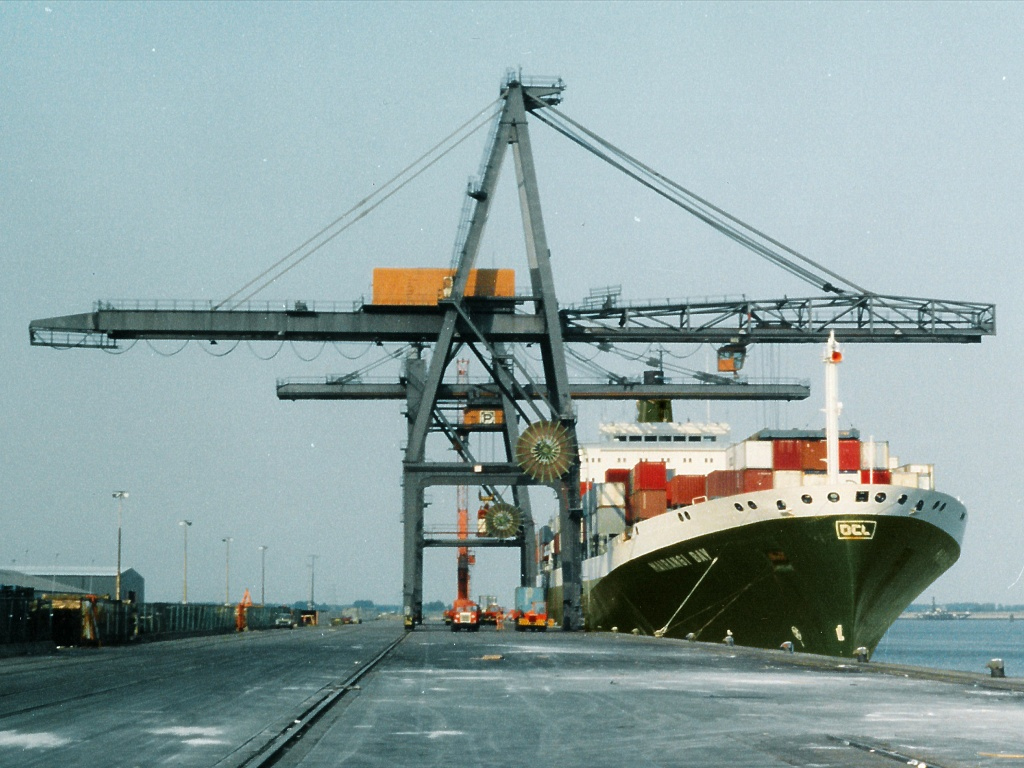
Mairangi Bay at Vlissengen

fMA
