= Gwalia (disambiguation) =

Gwalia is an archaic Welsh name for Wales.

Gwalia may also refer to:

- Gwalia, Liverpool, building
- Gwalia Singers (Swansea), male voice choir
- Gwalia, Western Australia, town located in Western Australia's Great Victoria Desert
- Gwalia Gold Mine, gold mine in Western Australia
- Sons of Gwalia, company
- Gwalia United F.C., Welsh football team based in Cardiff
