= MV Resolution Bay =

Container ship owned by OCL

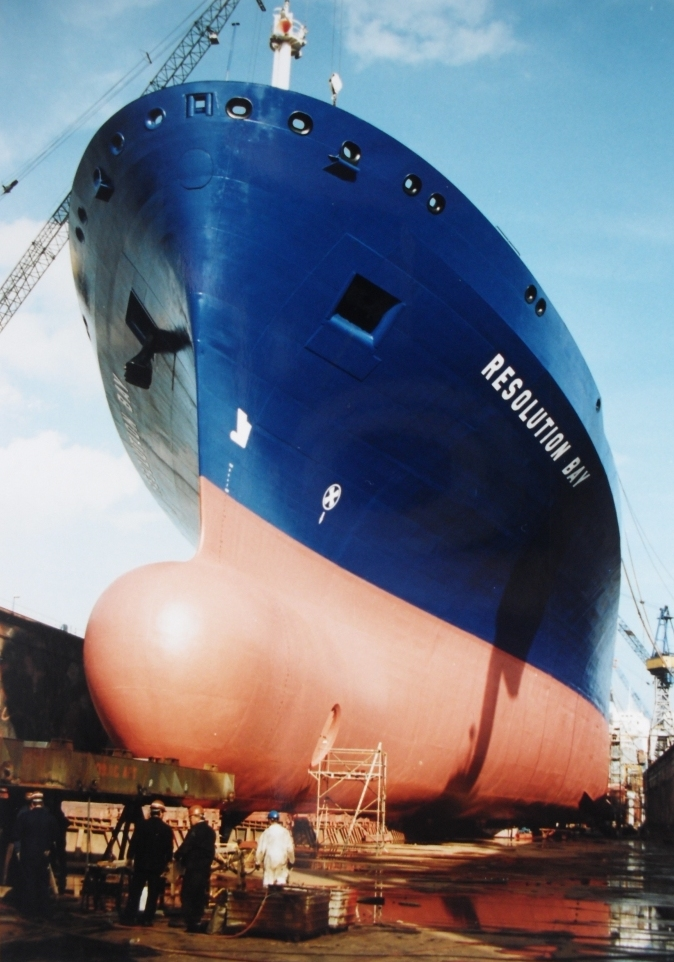
Resolution Bay (probably 1990/95)

MV Resolution Bay was a container ship owned by Overseas Containers Limited (OCL).

== History ==
Resolution Bay was launched and delivered to OCL in 1977, and was scrapped in 2002 in Hamburg, Germany. The ship was one of two identical sisters built by Bremer Vulkan shipyard in West Germany, the other being the MV Mairangi Bay. A third ship – the New Zealand Pacific – operated by The New Zealand Shipping Corporation, was save in minor details, identical to the two Bay ships. Owner OCL was to later become P&O Containers, which itself merged with Nedlloyd Lines to become P&O Nedlloyd. Resolution Bay operated for all three entities, mainly on the UK/Europe to Australia/New Zealand route.

== Statistics ==
Resolution Bay had a tonnage of 43,995 gross register tons (GRT) and a top speed of 23 knots. Length was 248.6m, and beam was 32.3m. She was propelled by two 8-cylinder two-stroke slow speed crosshead diesel engines with a total power output of 53,280 BHP. The MAN engines, model KS8Z90/160A, had a 900 mm bore and 1600 mm stroke. They were each directly coupled to one of the two propeller shafts, turning them at a maximum 122 rpm. Auxiliary power was provided by five 1,500 kW MaK medium speed diesel alternators. She could carry 2,344 twenty-foot equivalent units (TEU) worth of containers, 1,223 of them refrigerated (reefer) containers in holds below deck. The reefer capacity was one of the largest of any ship at the time, and the containers when loaded in the holds were connected to the ship's brine circulation system for cooling. The brine was cooled by a large refrigeration plant located in the engine room.
