= Overseas Containers =

Shipping company

Overseas Containers Limited

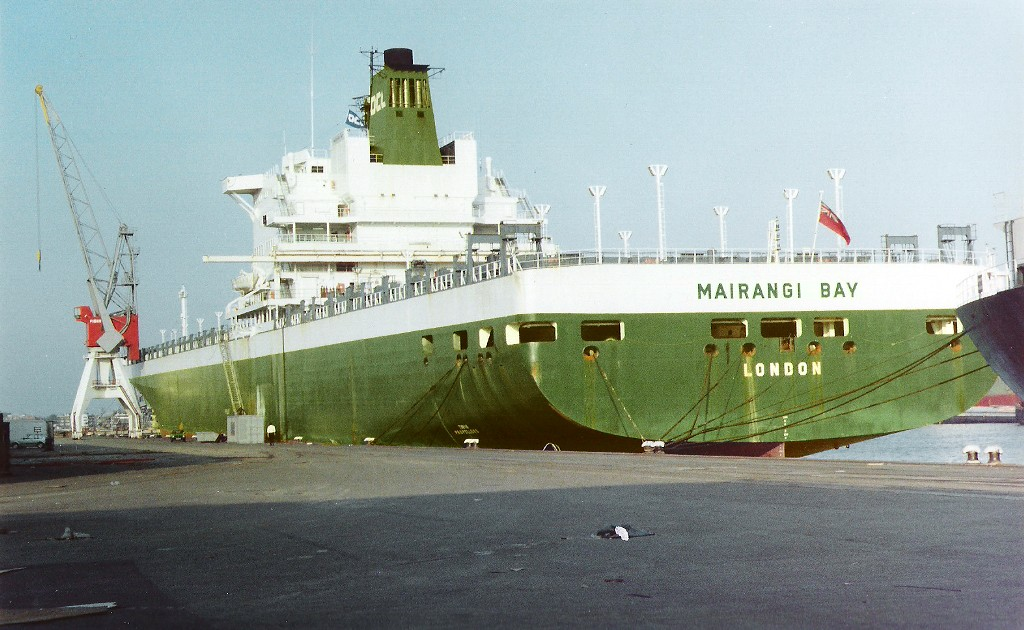
- Mairangi Bay at Rotterdam
- Industry: Shipping
- Founded: 1965
- Defunct: 1986
- Fate: Taken over by P&O
- Successor: P&O
- Headquarters: London, England
- Area served: Worldwide
- Services: Container transportation

Overseas Containers Limited (OCL) was a container shipping company formed by a consortium of British shipping companies in 1965. It was taken over by P&O in 1986.

== History ==
In the early days of containerisation considerable investment was still required in the necessary infrastructure to transport and handle shipping containers, and many shipping companies formed consortia to ease the financial burden. OCL was formed in 1965 by four British companies: British and Commonwealth Shipping, Furness Withy, P&O and the Ocean Steamship Company. Between 1969 and 1970 OCL took delivery of its first ships, a fleet of six vessels of 27,000 gross register tons (GRT) and 1,900 twenty-foot equivalent units (TEU) capacity for the UK/Europe to Australia route. Initially operating from a set of offices in Bevis Marks, London, OCL later moved to custom built offices on Braham Street, a few hundred yards away on a traffic island at the end of Commercial Road. The service was inaugurated on 6 March 1969 by Encounter Bay undertaking her maiden voyage, and OCL overcame heavy losses in the first years of operations to become one of the world's leading container lines.

The first trade route was the Australia/UK one followed later by the Far East/UK route. Initial arrivals in Europe intended for the UK had to be diverted and transhipped via Rotterdam, because of unresolved industrial disputes in UK ports.

OCL played a leading role in the development of CAMEL - the standardised format for electronic manifests. By 1982 OCL was Europe's largest container through transport operator with a fleet of 20 containerships and more than 60,000 container units. It served more than 50 major ports and, in 1980, transported more than a quarter of a million container loads of import and export cargo on a route network linking locations throughout four continents. One company, P&O, gradually increased its share of the consortium until in 1986 it bought the remaining 53% held by Ocean Transport and Trading (as The Ocean Steamship Company was by then known) and British & Commonwealth. On 1 January 1987 the name OCL ceased to exist, the operation becoming known as P&O Containers Limited (P&OCL). In 1996 P&O Containers merged with Nedlloyd to form P&O Nedlloyd. August 2005 saw the completion of a buyout of P&O Nedlloyd by the A.P. Moller-Maersk Group and in February 2006 the name Maersk Line was adopted for the combined fleets.

== Ships ==
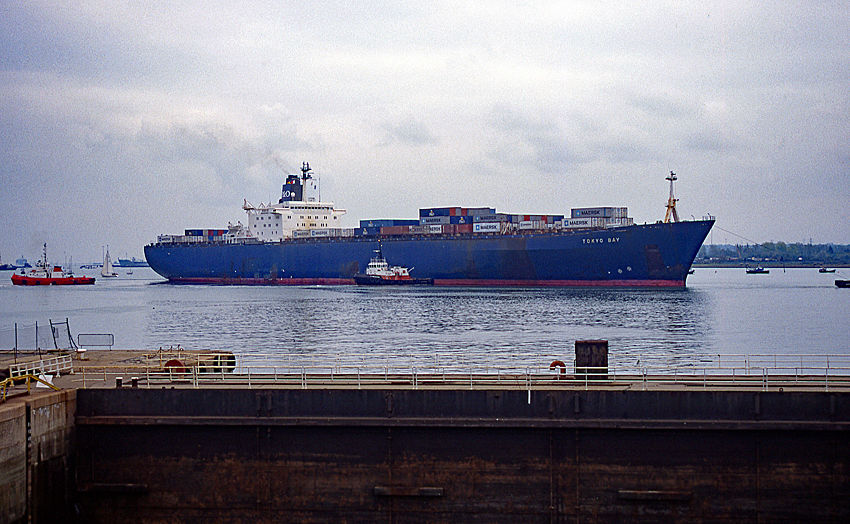
Tokyo Bay passing Southampton's dry dock in 1995

Container ships sailing for the company under the OCL banner were characterised by their green hulls with white topping, white superstructure and green funnels bearing the initials OCL in white letters. All OCL ships' names ended in Bay, such as Encounter Bay, Tokyo Bay, Liverpool Bay, Resolution Bay and Mairangi Bay. Subsidiary operations such as the Australia- Japan Container Line did not follow this trend, instead having names such as Arafura and Aotea. When OCL became P&OCL, there was a slight modification to the ships' colour scheme, the hulls becoming completely green and the OCL logo on the funnels being replaced with the P&O logo. Later the hulls and funnels were painted dark blue.. The naming convention was retained, and in June 2006 there were still a couple of Bay ships in the Maersk Line fleet.
