= Harrison Line =

Defunct british shipping line

- House flag
- Industry: Shipping
- Founded: 1853
- Defunct: 2000
- Fate: Taken over by P&O Nedlloyd
- Headquarters: Liverpool, England
- Area served: Worldwide
- Services: Container transportation

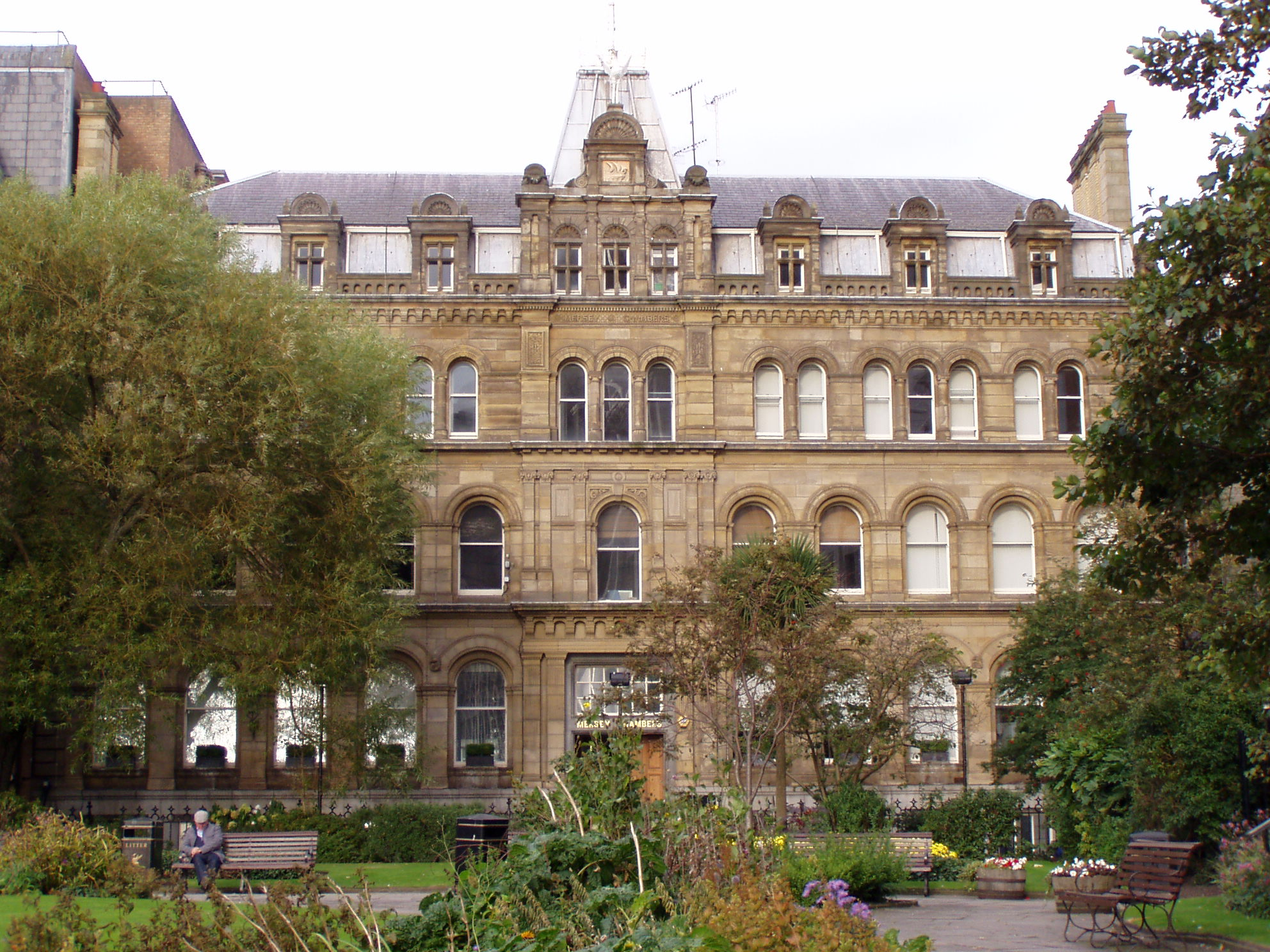
Mersey Chambers, headquarters of the Harrison Line, purpose built in 1878

Harrison Line, officially T&J Harrison, was a shipping line founded by the brothers Thomas and James Harrison in Liverpool, England in 1853. It ran both cargo and passenger services, starting with the import of French brandy from Charente.

The ships were grouped under the Charente Steam-ship Company in 1871 with Thomas and James Harrison as the managers.

The company ceased trading in October 2000, with all remaining rights and privileges transferred to P&O Nedlloyd.

== Early history ==
Thomas and James Harrison moved from the family farm in Cockerham, Lancashire, to the port of Liverpool to join the thriving shipping trade. Both were apprenticed to the shipping agent Samuel Brown and Son, Thomas in 1830 and James in 1838. Thomas was made a partner in 1839 and the name of the firm was changed to George Brown and Harrison (George was Samuel’s son). James Harrison was made a partner in 1849. Closely involved with Samuel Brown, and integral to the development of the Liverpool firm, was Richard Williamson, trading out of France, who had been supplying cargoes of brandy from Charente. Four small ships were bought for the brandy trade in the late 1830s, owned under varying co-partnership arrangements between the two sides.

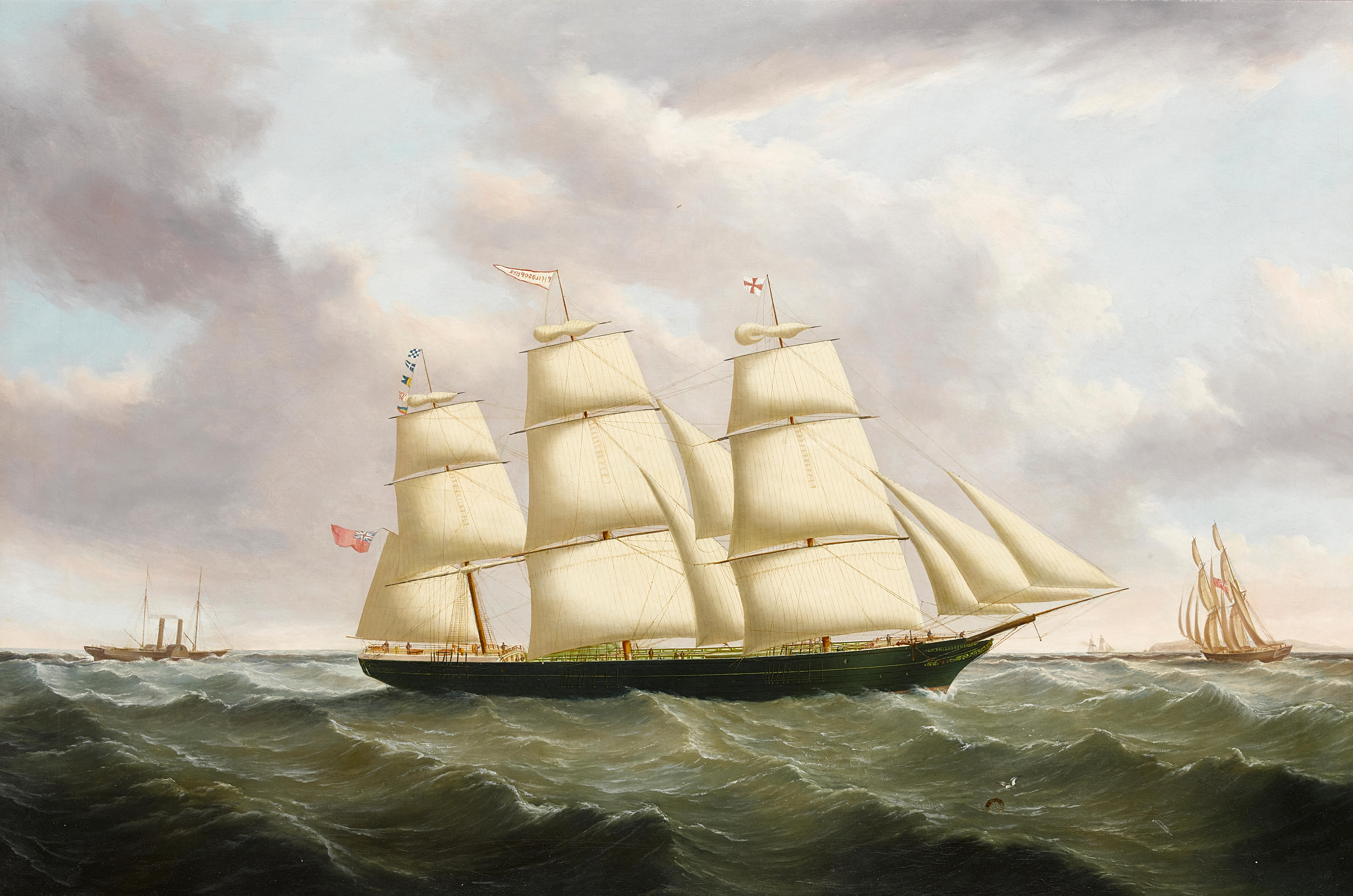
T. & J. Harrison's first iron ship, Philosopher, passing Holyhead on her maiden voyage to India, 19 June 1857

After the death of George Brown in 1853, the business continued under the name of T and J Harrison, still concentrating on the brandy trade into Liverpool and London. Price competition led to Harrison’s withdrawal from the London market in 1863 giving impetus to the firm’s geographic expansion. By the late 1860s, the principal shareholders in the ships were Thomas and James, with smaller shares being held by another brother, Edward George Harrison, the fourth partner being Richard Pierre Williamson (the son of the elder Richard) in France. Another name also appeared then, that of the bookkeeper, John William Hughes who steadily increased his shareholding in the ships and he and his family played an important role in the development of the Harrison Line.

== Incorporation ==
In 1871, the disparate holdings in individual ships by individual partners were grouped together under the name of the Charente Steam-ship Company; in this way, Charente would own the ships and they would be managed by the firm of T & J Harrison. The Harrison partners controlled Charente. With the retirement of James Harrison in 1880, and the ill health of Thomas, active control passed to a younger generation, Frederic James Harrison and John William Hughes being “the acknowledged leaders”. They were responsible for formalizing the relationship with Charente by constituting it as a limited company in 1884. The 512 shares of £1,000 each were held by 32 individuals, being members of the Harrison, Hughes and Williamson families and their close friends. A reduction in the number of shares took place in 1908 with the ownership now being in the hands of five Harrisons, five Hughes and two Williamsons. At the time of the incorporation in 1884, the Harrison Line had 22 ships; this had risen to 30 by 1890 and 57 on the outbreak of WWI.

== Geographic expansion and the shipping conferences ==
The 1860s had seen the expansion of the shipping line’s geographic operations, including the Mediterranean fruit trade, Brazil and India. In 1866 a liner service was started between Liverpool and New Orleans. A permanent wharf was built for Harrisons in Galveston and, based on the import of cotton to Lancashire, it proved a very profitable route. Harrison ships also began regular sailings to India following the opening of the Suez Canal in 1869. The partners were closely involved with the Canal administration and John William Hughes became a director in 1905, a family involvement that continued until 1950. Harrisons were actively involved in the establishment of shipping conferences, a method of regulating the international cargo trade: it was a founder member of the Calcutta Conference in 1875, the Central Brazil Conference in 1896, and the West India, Atlantic Steamship Conference in 1904. It had also joined the South African Conference in 1902.

== War and depression ==
Heavy shipping losses during World War I were more or less balanced by new additions to the fleet, particularly the 12 ships bought from the Rankin-Gilmour fleet in 1917; by 1920 Harrisons owned a record 58 ships. However, the inter-war period proved a difficult time. The Conference lines had to content with periodic price cutting from tramp steamers. Trade was depressed and the Harrison Line was hard hit in the depression years 1929-32. In 1931-31, 15 ships were laid up and in 1932 a further 10 ships were sold at break-up prices. Despite this, the Company remained profitable. With the recovery in international trade from 1933, Harrisons began to rebuild its fleet, both from new build and purchases from other lines, including four ships from Furness Withy and seven from the Leyland Line. Nevertheless, by the outbreak of WWII the fleet still stood at no more than 46 ships. Of these, 30 ships were subsequently lost during the War.

== Rebuilding and decline ==
Once again, Harrisons had to rebuild its fleet. By 1949 Harrisons had added 16 Liberty and Empire type ships, and 20 motor ships were added later. In 1970 Harrisons diversified by buying three bulk carriers, Wanderer, Wayfarer and Warrior. It also joined the container revolution, entering the Caribbean Overseas Lines (CAROL) consortium in 1977 and purchasing a ship for the South African trade. In 1981 Harrisons were founder members of the East African consortium. The line also managed two bulk carriers registered in Hong Kong However, the Harrison Line was no longer prospering. The size of the Charente Steamship fleet began to decline and by 1987 it had only three ships, although T & J Harrison did manage other ships.

The Harrison Line drew to an end in 2000, when the last of the liner trades managed by the Company ended all rights were transferred to P&O Nedlloyd. T & J Harrison was renamed Harrison Logistics but it went into voluntary liquidation in 2002. The original Charente Steamship Company which had owned the remaining liner trades, renamed itself Charente, and specialised in charts and nautical instruments. However, its 2008 accounts referred to substantial pension liabilities and industrial claims. Administrators were appointed in 2010 and the Company was subsequently placed in liquidation.

== Ships of the Harrison Line ==
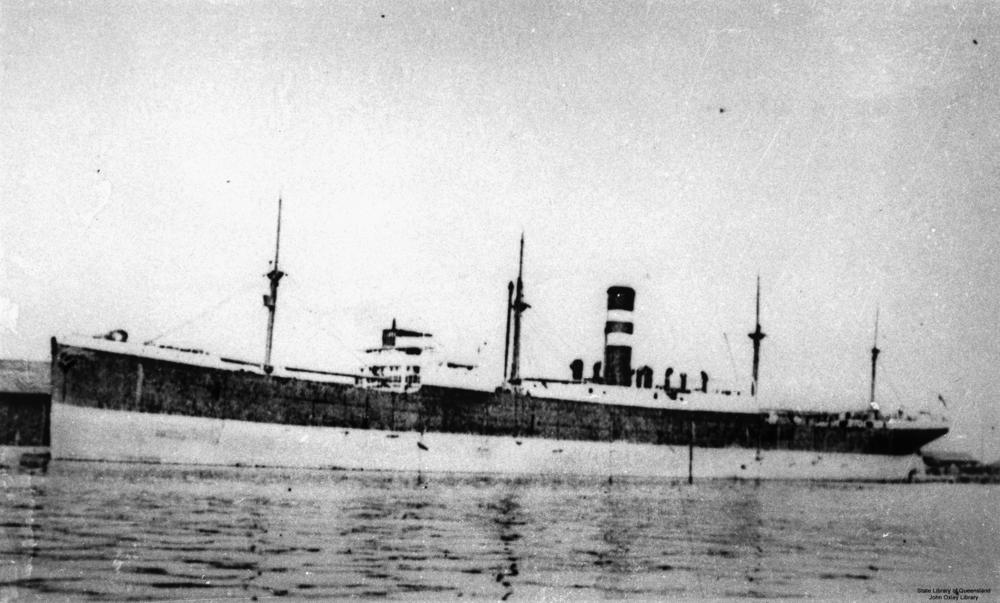
T&J Harrison 8,258 GRT cargo steamship Defender, built in 1915 and scrapped in 1952

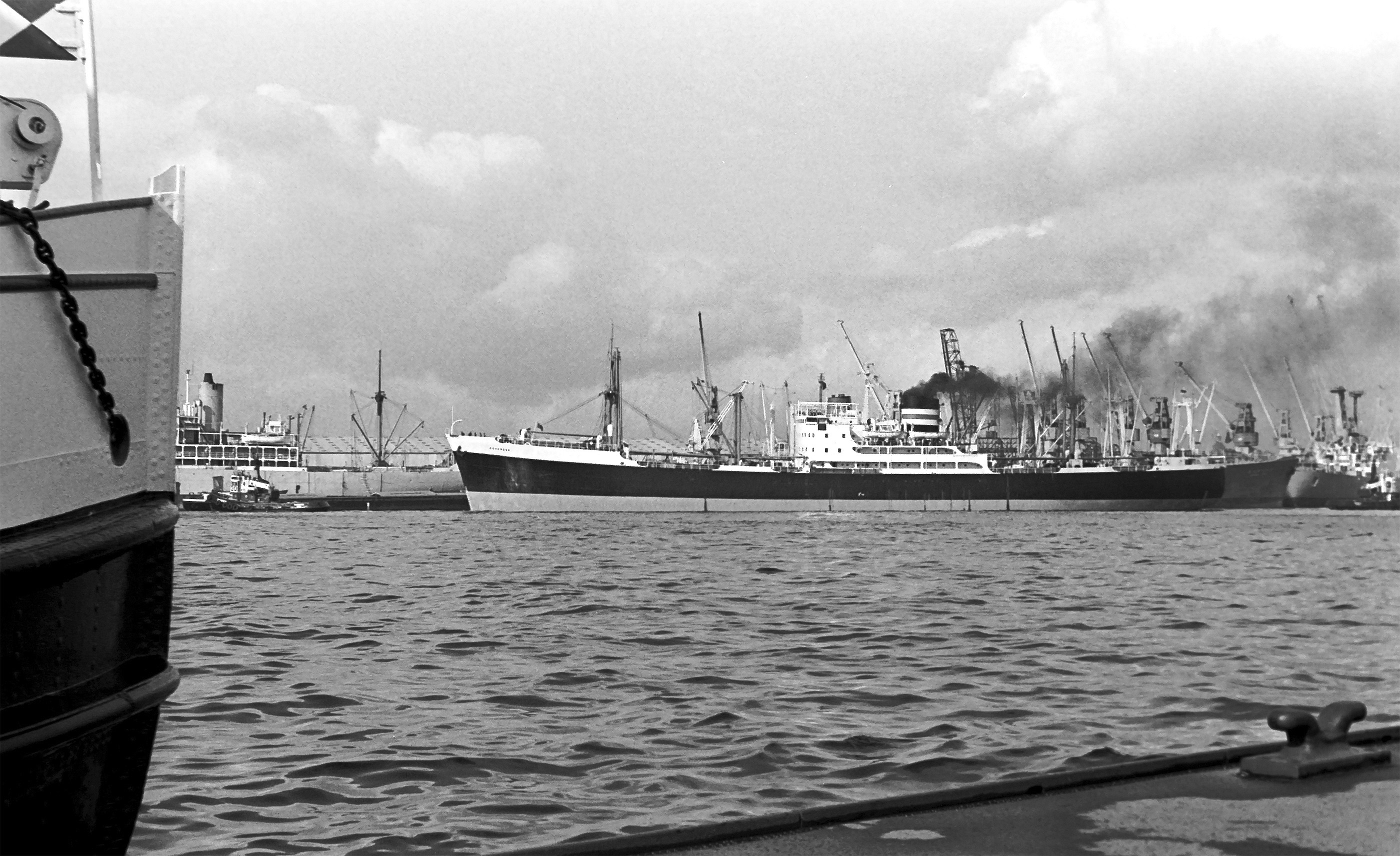
T&J Harrison SS Governor, built in 1952 and scrapped in 1979

- SS Adviser
- SS Auditor
- SS Collegian
- SS Colonial
- SS Crofter
- SS Defender
- SS Designer
- SS Diplomat
- SS Dramatist
- SS Factor
- SS Governor
- SS Historian
- SS Philosopher
- SS Plainsman
- SS Planter
- SS Politician
- SS Scholar
- SS Specialist
- SS Spectator
- SS Traveller
- SS Yeoman
