= The Old Library, Liverpool =

The Old Library
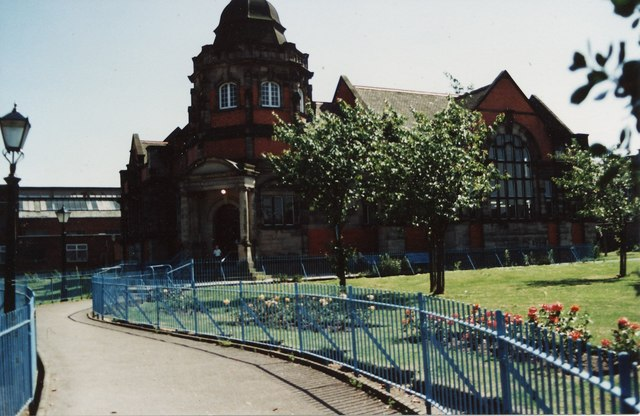
- Library pictured in 2003
- Interactive map of the The Old Library area
- Former names: Lister Drive Library

General information
- Location: Tuebrook, Liverpool, United Kingdom
- Coordinates: 53°25′14″N 2°55′33″W
- Current tenants: Lister Steps
- Opened: 27 June 1905
- Renovated: 2019
- Owner: Liverpool City Council

Design and construction
- Architect: Thomas Shelmerdine
- Awards and prizes: Royal Institute of British Architects

Website
- https://www.tol.org.uk/

The Old Library, formerly known as Lister Drive Library, is a Grade II listed former Andrew Carnegie library in Tuebrook, Liverpool, England. Opening in June 1905, it is now used as a community centre and charity hub for childcare services and start-up businesses. The current tenants are Lister Steps.

== History ==
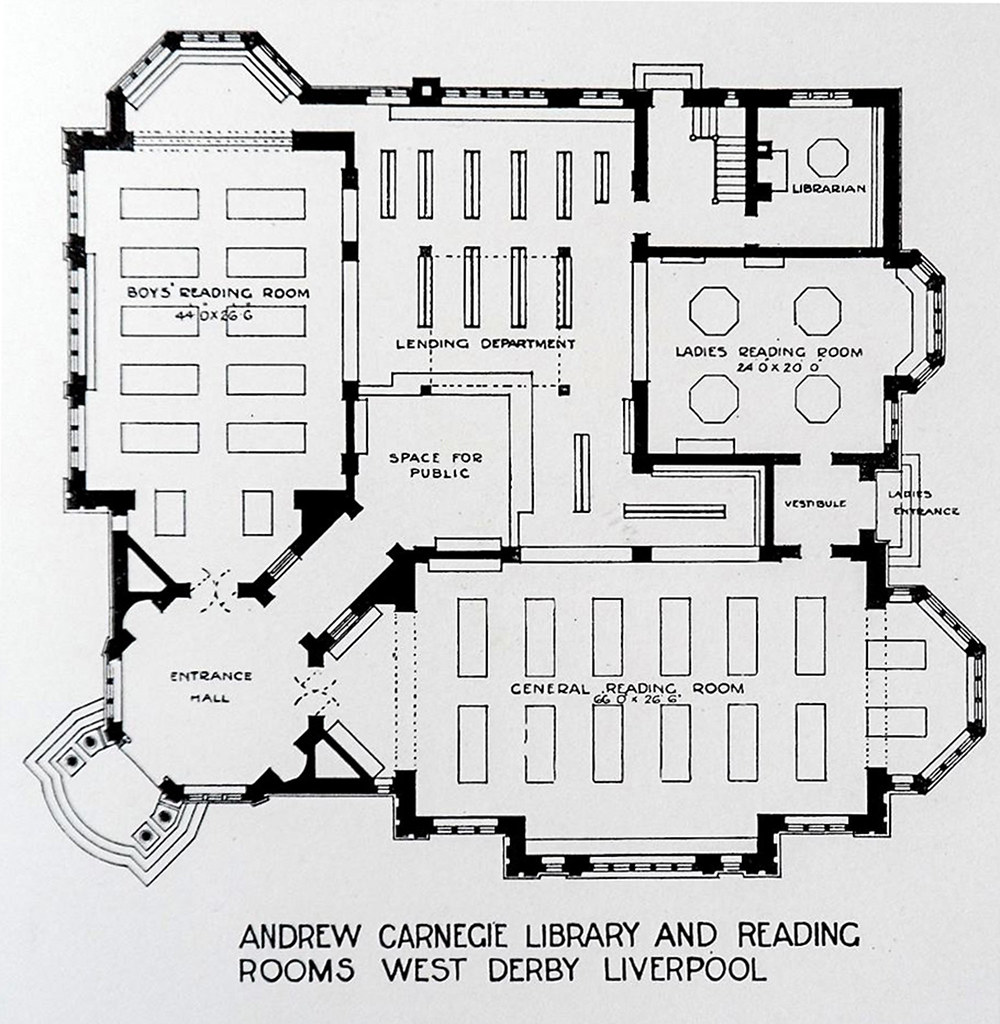
Floor plan upon construction

=== Construction ===
The library was built as a cost of around £13,000 and was named "The Andrew Carnegie Library", following a recommendation to the city council that resolve to approve its construction. It was constructed with brick walls dressed with stone and a slate roof. Above the main entrance is a tower and skylight.

The library was opened on 27 June 1905.

=== Decline ===
Following the detection of structural problems in 2006, the library closed. Local newspaper the Liverpool Echo featured the library in its Stop the Rot campaign. In 2016, it was reported that £3.9 million from the National Lottery Heritage Fund was granted to the city council that would help towards refurbishment of the building into a community centre.

== Restoration ==
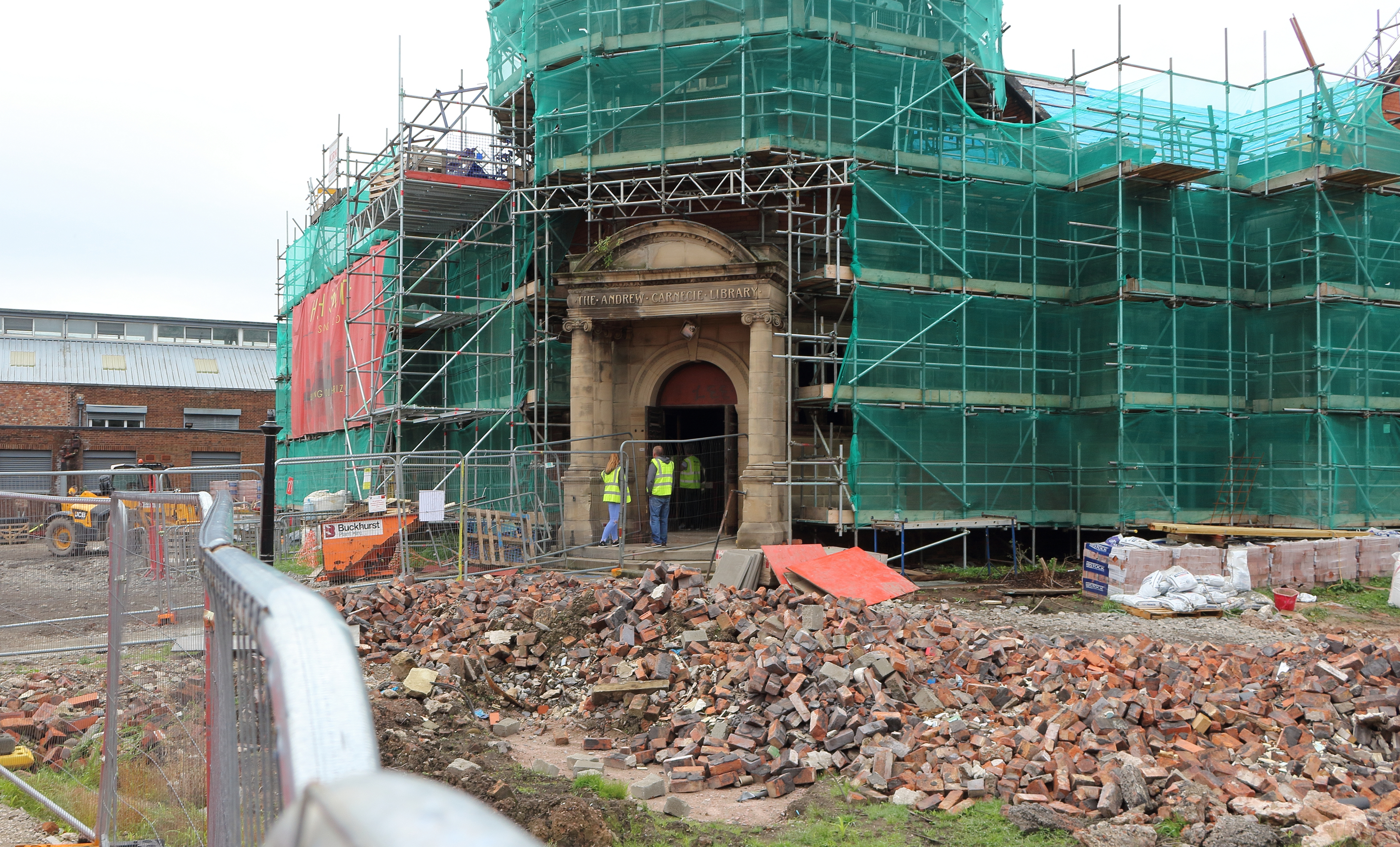
Exterior entrance during restoration, September 2019

The Grade II listed building had been vacant following closure as a Library in 2006, which was owned by Liverpool City Council. In 2012, local community based charity Lister Steps were selected to take on the building as a base for their services.

Restoration on the building began on 1 April 2019, following the contract being awarded by the city council to HH Smith and Sons Ltd. The estimated cost was in the region of £3 million, of which the council would contribute £500,000 with the remainder supported by grant funding from the National Lottery Heritage Fund. Restoration costs were subsequently higher than expected due to the discovery of dry rot in the roof space and in areas which were inaccessible during the survey, resulting in a project overspend. The increased costs were primarily attributed to the need to replacement timber and plaster, exhausting the contingency fund.

The restoration was expected to take approximately 12 months, however the discovery of extensive dry rot and the poor condition of the structure meant additional time was needed.

== Present day ==
Prior to the restoration, local charity Lister Steps which provides childcare services were offered a 125-year lease with a £5,000 annual rent, calculated as £1,000 per annum for every £100,000 of investment by the council into restoring the structure. Following the increased cost in restoration, the annual rental figure was increased to £9,350 with an increase of 9.4% every 3 years.

As well as childcare services, community and commercial services are also offered, such as the provision of lettable office space to support start-up businesses. The building reopened to the public in 2020.

In April 2022, the £4 million restoration of the library building was one of six winners of the Royal Institute of British Architects award, as well as the North West Client of the Year Award, each chosen by a jury of experts who visited the site personally.

== See also ==
- List of libraries in Liverpool
