= SS Adviser =

British cargo steamship

History

United Kingdom
- Name: Adviser
- Owner: Charente SS Co
- Operator: T&J Harrison
- Port of registry: Liverpool
- Builder: Lithgows, Port Glasgow
- Yard number: 917
- Launched: 23 February 1939
- Completed: April 1939
- Identification: UK official number 166263; call sign GSSK
- Fate: Scrapped, 1960

General characteristics
- Type: cargo ship
- Tonnage: 6,348 GRT, 3,886 NRT, 9,000 DWT
- Length: 445.5 ft (135.8 m)
- Beam: 56.5 ft (17.2 m)
- Draught: 25 ft 9 1/2 in (7.86 m)
- Depth: 29.6 ft (9.0 m)
- Decks: 2
- Installed power: triple-expansion engine + exhaust turbine; 867 NHP
- Propulsion: 1 × screw
- Speed: 12 1/2 knots (23 km/h)
- Capacity: from 1940: 60 passengers
- Crew: 66
- Armament: in WW2: DEMS

SS Adviser was a British cargo steamship. She was built in Scotland in 1939, and scrapped in Belgium in 1960. Throughout her career, the Charente Steam-Ship Company owned her, and Thomas & James Harrison of Liverpool managed her. She was the first of two Harrison Line ships that were called Adviser. The second was a container ship that was built in 1977.

== Class ==
Between 1935 and 1944, Harrison Line took delivery of a class of 13 cargo steamships. The first two were launched in 1935: Inventor by D. and W. Henderson and Company in Glasgow; and Explorer by Swan, Hunter & Wigham Richardson in Wallsend, County Durham. However, Lithgows in Port Glasgow built most of the class: Tribesman and Strategist in 1937; Scientist in 1938; Adviser and Barrister in 1939; Dalesman in 1940; and Prospector and Geologist in 1944. Charles Connell and Company in Scotstoun built Settler in 1939 and Trader in 1940; and Harland & Wolff in Govan, Glasgow built Novelist in 1940.

== Building and registration ==
Lithgows built Adviser as yard number 917; launched her on 23 February 1939; and completed her that April. Her registered length was 445.5 ft (135.8 m); her beam was 56.5 ft (17.2 m); her depth was 29.6 ft (9.0 m); and her draught was 25 ft 9 1/2 in (7.86 m). Her tonnages were 6,348 GRT, 3,886 NRT, and 9,000 DWT. She had a very slightly raked bow, and a cruiser stern.

Adviser had a single screw. Her main engine was a three-cylinder triple-expansion engine built by David Rowan & Co of Glasgow. It was augmented by an exhaust turbine, which drove the same propeller shaft via a Föttinger fluid coupling and double reduction gearing. The combined power of her two engines was rated at 867 NHP, and gave her a speed of at least 12 1/2 knots (23 km/h). In 1940, accommodation for 60 passengers was added to the ship.

Adviser was registered in Liverpool. Her UK official number was 166263, and her call sign was GSSK.

== Second World War ==
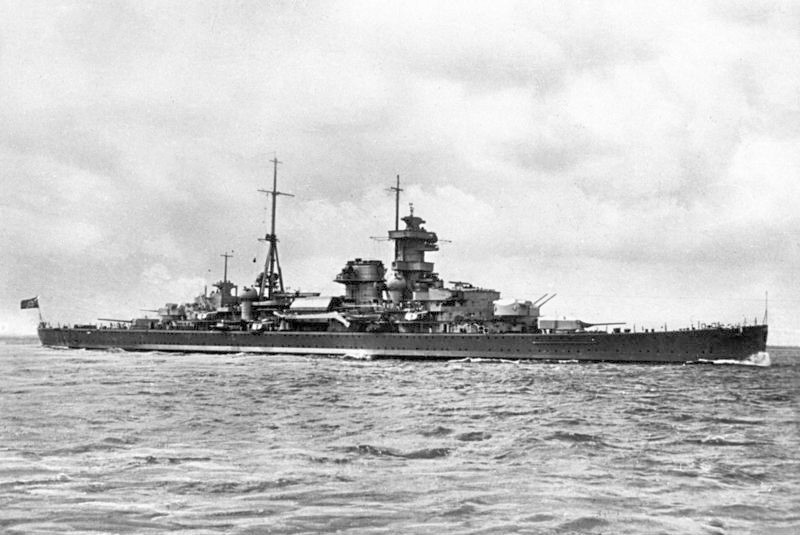
The German cruiser Admiral Hipper

On 18 December 1940, Adviser left Glasgow and joined Convoy WS 5A, which was outward bound from Liverpool. The convoy included a dozen troopships and two of Adviser's sister ships: Barrister and Settler. By 24 December, its escort included the heavy cruisers Berwick and Shropshire; light cruisers Bonaventure and Dunedin; and aircraft carriers Argus and Furious. At dawn on 25 December, the German cruiser Admiral Hipper attacked the convoy in the Atlantic, 700 nautical miles (1,300 km) west of Finisterre. Hipper attacked HMS Berwick; the merchant ships were ordered to disperse; and Bonaventure engaged Hipper. The German cruiser damaged Berwick and one of the troopships, Empire Trooper, but was forced to break off the attack. Adviser and her sister ships were undamaged.

Adviser supported the Allied invasion of Madagascar in 1942. She left Mombasa in Kenya on 3 September, and was in Majunga (Mahajanga) on the northwest coast of Madagascar from 10 to 28 September. From 1 to 31 October, when Vichy French forces were nearing defeat, she was in Tamatave (Toamasina) on the east coast.

In Tamatave, Adviser loaded a cargo of graphite. On 6 November 1942 she reached Durban in South Africa, and on 14 November resumed her voyage, bound for Trinidad, New York, and the UK. At noon that day, U-178 sighted her and followed her. Aircraft attacked the U-boat at 14:23 hrs, but failed to damage it, and it resumed its pursuit of Adviser. At 23:23 hrs that night, U-178 fired two torpedoes, both of which missed. At 01:45 hrs on 15 November, the U-boat fired another two torpedoes, both of which hit Adviser, crippling her at position 32°03′S 33°52′E, about 200 nautical miles (370 km) southeast of Durban. U-178 saw her crew abandon ship, but then heard depth charges in the distance, and therefore had to leave the area without being able to wait to see whether the ship had sunk. In fact Adviser, despite being badly damaged, remained afloat, so her Master, Captain John Thurston Ling, and his crew, re-boarded her latre that morning. Two tugs towed her back to Durban, where she arrived on 19 November 1942. She was repaired there, and returned to service in August 1943.

== Later career ==
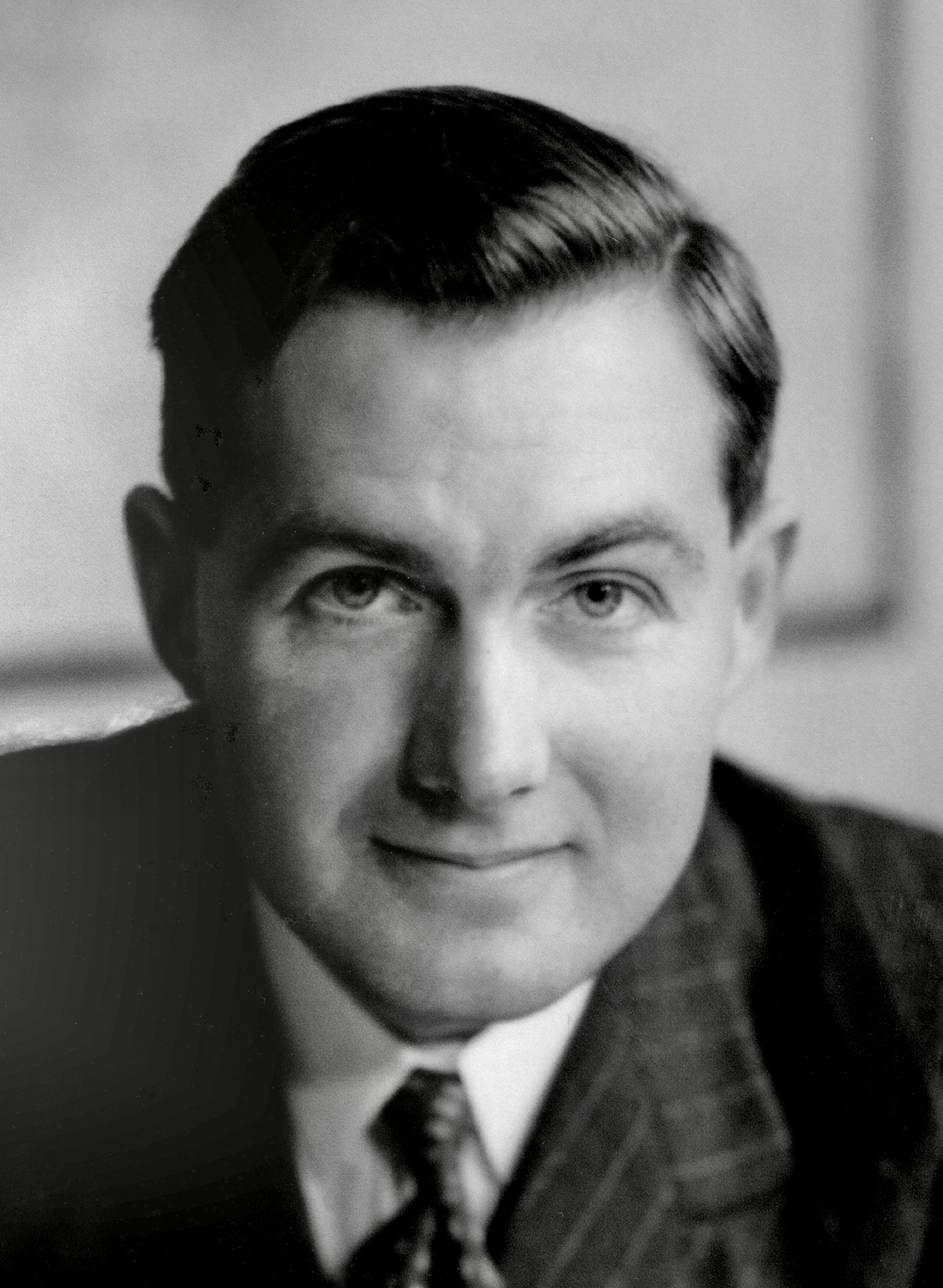
James Callaghan, Minister of Transport

In 1949, there was a dispute between National Union of Seamen and Harrison Line about the condition of Adviser's crew accommodation. This led to a court hearing in Northfleet in Kent, between the NUS and the company. On 7 November that year, in the House of Commons, Sir Richard Acland, Bart, MP for Gravesend, asked James Callaghan, Minister of Transport, whether he would publish the reports about living conditions on the ship that his Department had received in recent weeks. Callaghan replied "Reports made by Ministry of Transport surveyors are confidential documents, but the facts were before the Court which tried cases concerning this ship at Northfleet and at which a surveyor gave evidence. As that evidence showed, an official of the National Union of Seamen agreed with the Surveyor that the accommodation was reasonable and habitable. It is not of the standard to be found in new ships and the owners have been asked to put right certain minor defects, and to consider the possibility of making improvements."

In August 1952, at Blyth, Northumberland, Adviser was converted from coal to oil. On 4 or 5 September 1960 she arrived at Temse in Belgium, to be broken up by Jos. Boel & Fils.

== Bibliography ==
- Haws, Duncan (1988). Thos. & Jas. Harrison. Merchant Fleets. Vol. 15. Hereford: Travel Creatours Ltd Publications. ISBN 0-946378-12-6.
- Lloyd's Register of Shipping (PDF). Vol. II.–Steamers and Motorships of 300 tons. Trawlers, tugs, dredgers, etc. London: Lloyd's Register of Shipping. 1939 – via Southampton City Council.
- Register Book. Vol. I. Register of Ships. London: Lloyd's Register of Shipping. 1955 – via Internet Archive.
