= St Oswald's Church, Old Swan, Liverpool =

Coordinates: 53.4120°N 2.9141°W

St Oswald's Church, Old Swan
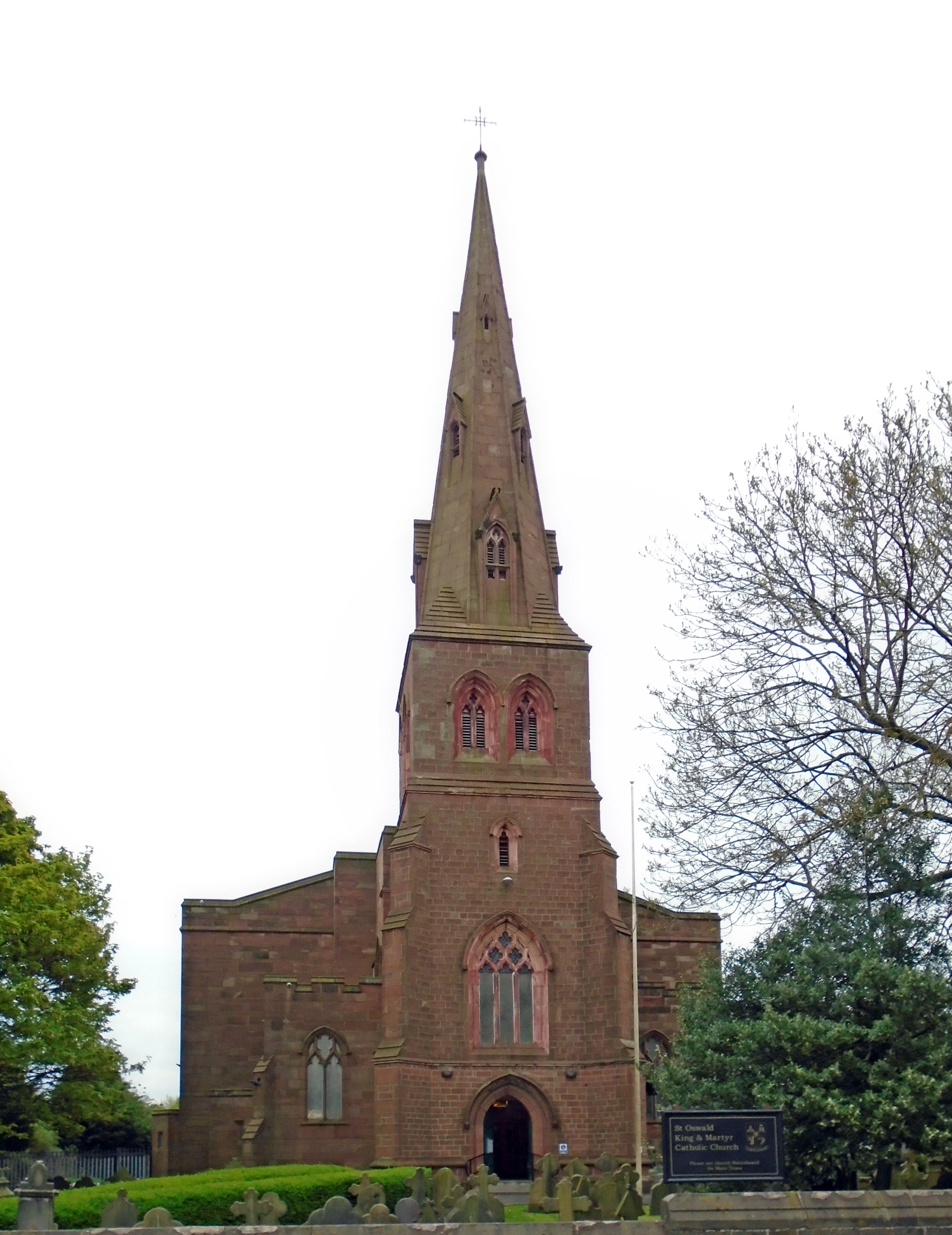
- St Oswald's Church from the northwest

- Location in Merseyside
- OS grid reference: SJ 393 910
- Location: St Oswald's Street, Old Swan, Liverpool, Merseyside
- Country: England
- Denomination: Roman Catholic
- Website: St Oswald, Old Swan

History
- Status: Parish church

Architecture
- Functional status: Active
- Heritage designation: Grade II
- Designated: 28 June 1952
- Architect(s): A. W. N. Pugin, Adrian Gilbert Scott
- Architectural type: Church
- Style: Gothic Revival
- Groundbreaking: c. 1840
- Completed: 1957

Specifications
- Materials: Sandstone, brick, concrete

Clergy
- Priest: Revd Mark Beattie

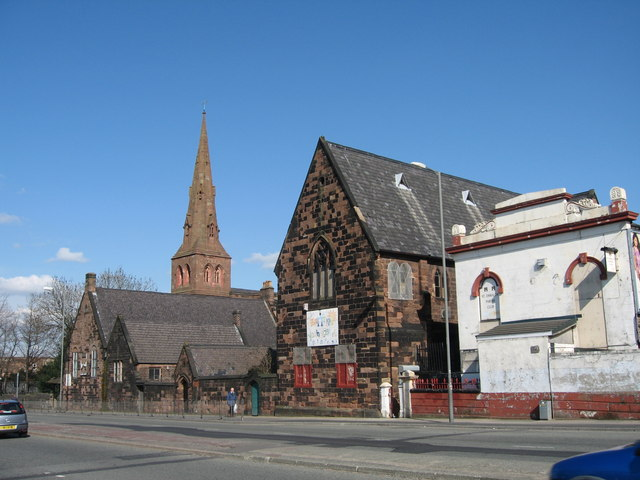
Schools and parish hall

St Oswald's Church is a Roman Catholic parish church in St Oswald's Street, Old Swan, Liverpool, Merseyside, England. It is an active parish church in the Archdiocese of Liverpool and in St Joseph's Pastoral Area. The church is recorded in the National Heritage List for England as a designated Grade II listed building.

== History ==
The church was built between about 1840 and 1842, and was designed by A. W. N. Pugin. Of this church, only the west steeple has survived. The body of the church was completely rebuilt in 1951–57, and was designed by Adrian Gilbert Scott.

== Architecture ==
=== Exterior ===
The steeple is built in red sandstone, and consists of a tower with a broach spire. It is in Decorated style and has fine carved detail. The tower is in four stages, with diagonal buttresses and a pointed west entrance. Over the entrance is a three-light window, and in the third stage are lancet windows on three sides. The top stage contains two-light bell openings. On the spire are three tiers of lucarnes. To the south of the steeple is a canted stair turret with a stone hipped roof. Other than the west front, the body of the church is in brick, with four-light Perpendicular windows along the sides of the aisles.

=== Interior ===
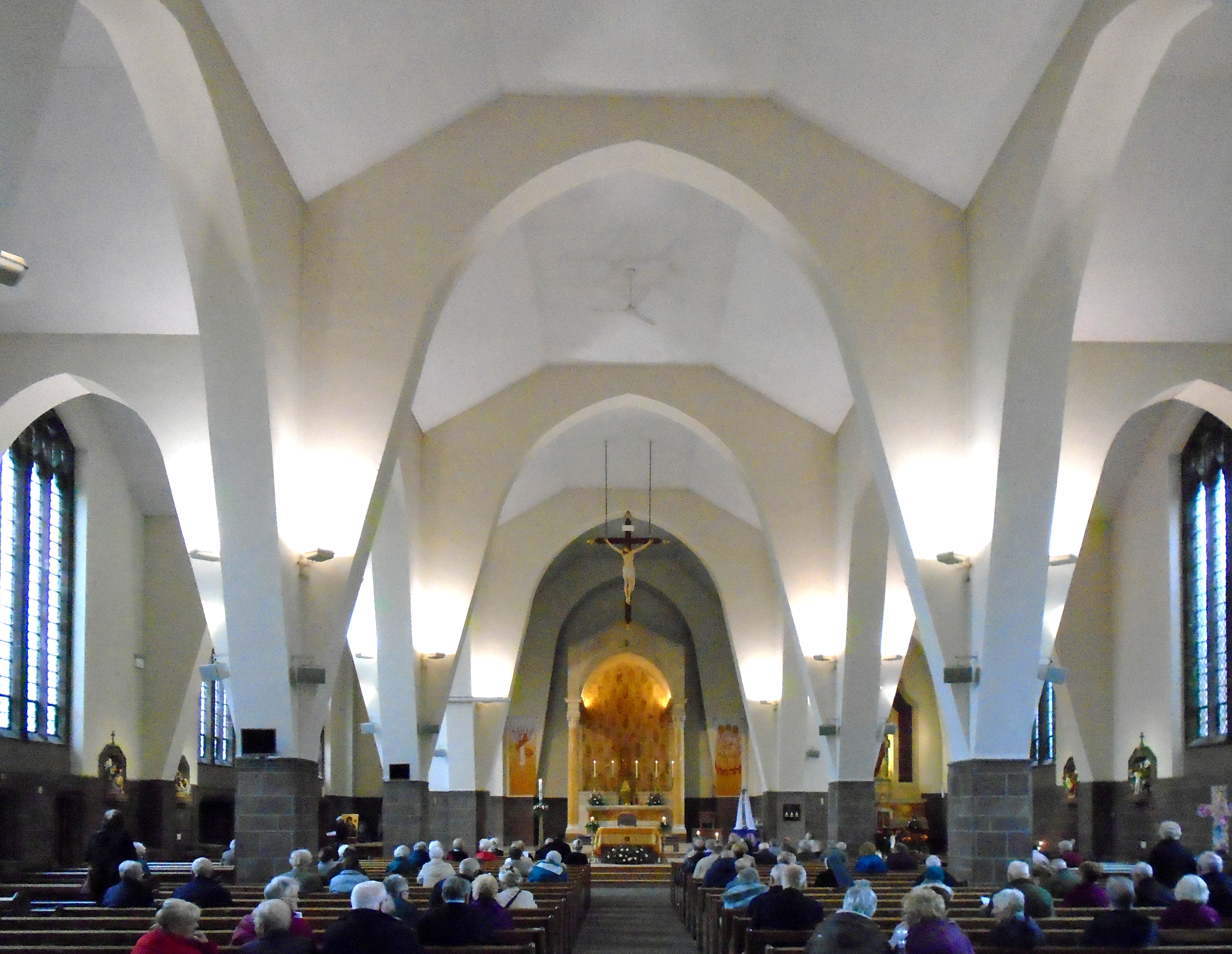
Looking along the nave towards the altar

Inside the church the walls are in stone up to head height, and in painted concrete above. The piers of the arcades carry hyperbolic concrete arches spreading in four directions. The high altar is surrounded by a baldacchino in multi-coloured marble. The nave altar and the lectern stand on a platform. The two-manual pipe organ was made by Ainscough, and rebuilt in 1987 by Rushworth and Dreaper.

== Associated buildings ==
South of the church is a group of buildings that evoke "Pugin's ideal of a medieval Christian community".

=== Presbytery ===
This was built in 1857 and designed by E. W. Pugin. It stands to the south of the church, and is built in stone with a slate roof. The presbytery has two storeys, and a front of four bays. The end bays project forward, the first bay under a gable, the fourth bay with a bay window under a hipped roof. Above the entrance in the third bay is a niche containing a statue of Saint Oswald. The presbytery is listed at Grade II.

=== Schools and parish hall ===
To the southwest of the church are two former schools with gables facing St Oswald's Street. That nearer the church is a simple building, in one storey, and with plain mullioned windows. Beyond this is a larger former school, dating from about 1855, and possibly designed by A. W. N. Pugin. It is in sandstone with a slate roof, has two storeys, and is in a T-shaped plan, with a front of seven bays. The windows on the sides are ogee-headed lancets, and at the end facing the street is a three-light Decorated window. The school was later used as a youth centre, and is designated as a Grade II listed building. To the south of this is a former Methodist chapel of 1845. It is a simple rectangular stuccoed brick building with round-headed windows, which has been converted for use as the parish hall.

=== Convent of Mercy ===
This is a sandstone group of buildings with slate roofs attached to the rear of the smaller school, which was almost certainly designed by A. W. N. Pugin. It consists of ranges of buildings on the north and east sides of a courtyard in one and two storeys. The convent building itself is small, containing only eight cells, with a chapel on the first floor. The convent complex is a Grade II listed building.

== See also ==
- Grade II listed buildings in Liverpool-L13
