= SS Planter =

A number of steamships have been named Planter, including –

- SS Planter (1927), a British cargo ship torpedoed and sunk in November 1940
- SS Planter (1937), a British refrigerated cargo liner in service 1946–58
