= Thomas Harrison (ship-owner) =

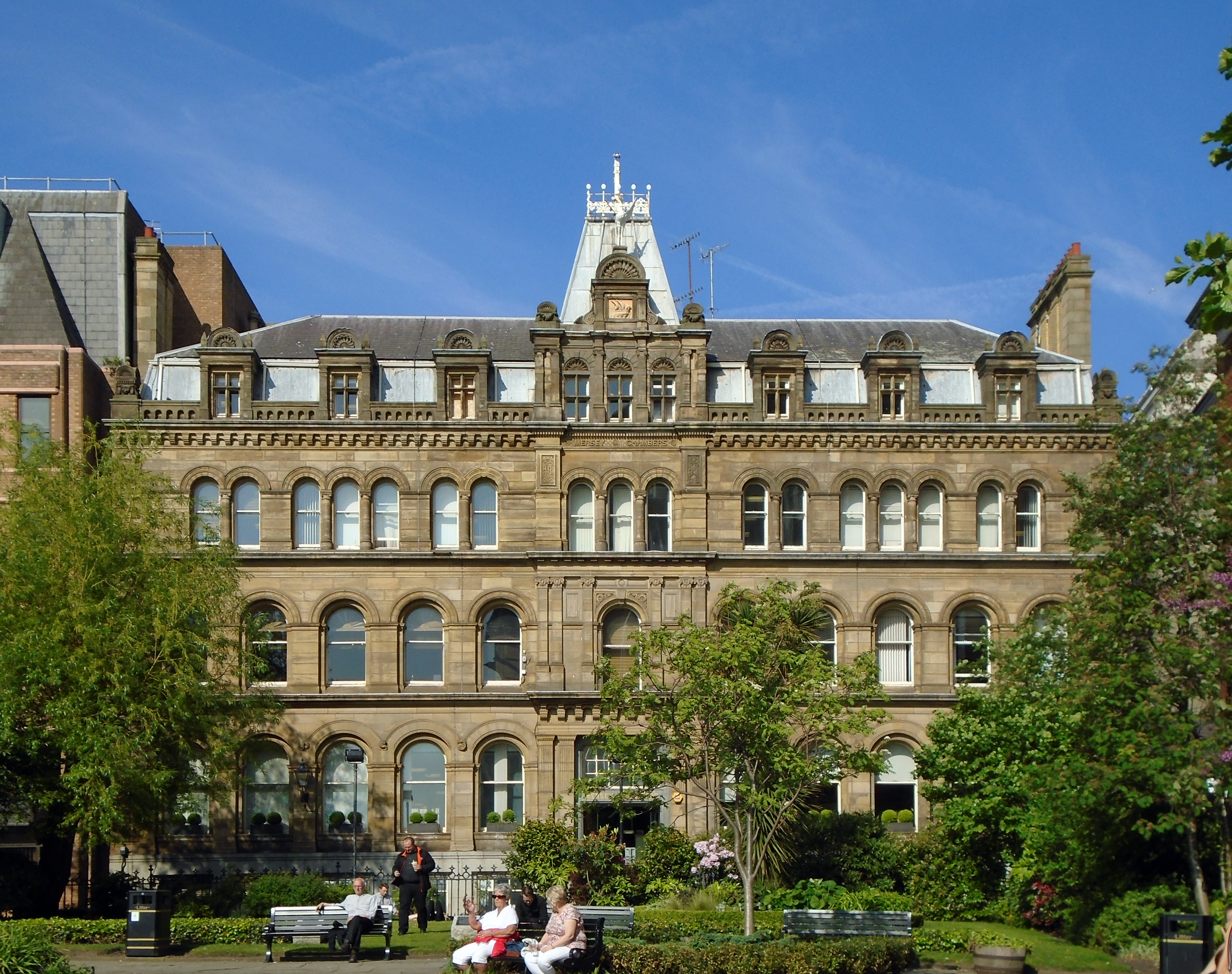
Mersey Chambers, headquarters of the Harrison Line purpose built in 1878

Thomas Frederic Harrison (1815–1888) was a Liverpool ship-owner who founded the Harrison Shipping Line in the city in the late 1800s.
