= Gwalia, Liverpool =

Grade II listed building in Liverpool, England

Coordinates: 53°25′25.7″N 2°54′51.7″W

Gwalia
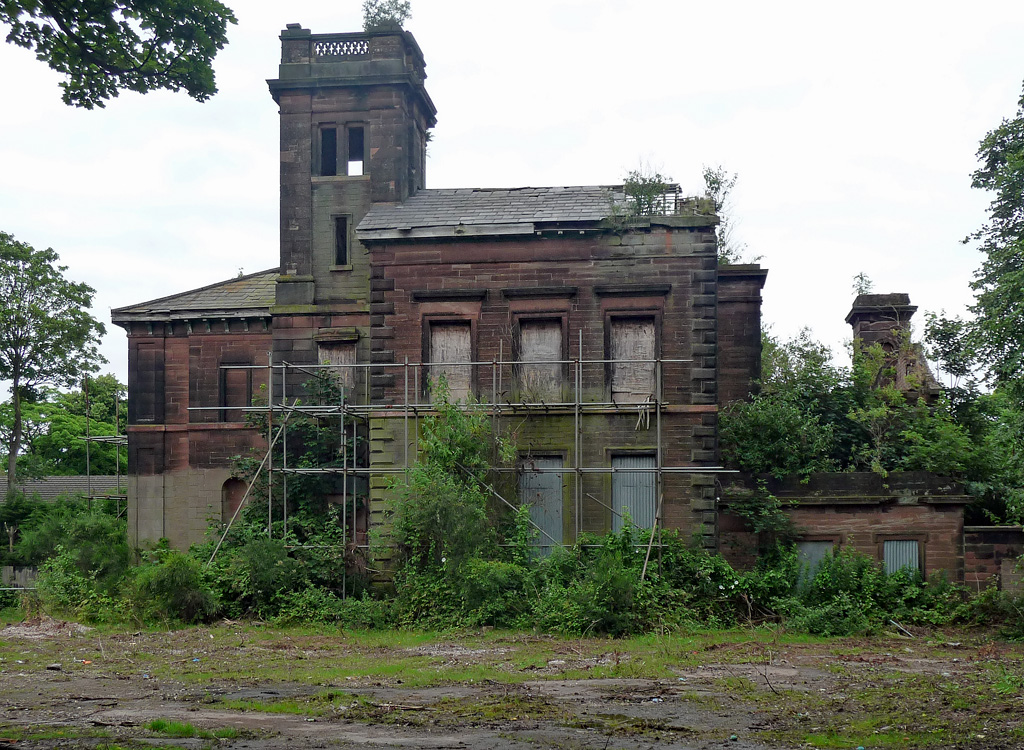
- Gwalia in a state of disrepair, July 2016
- Interactive map of Gwalia
- Location: Queens Drive, West Derby, Liverpool
- Built: 1854; 171 years ago
- Architectural style: Neoclassical style

Listed Building – Grade II
- Official name: Gwalia
- Designated: 1 August 1973
- Reference no.: 1209033

Gwalia, formerly known as Sandfield Tower, is a derelict building in Queens Drive in West Derby, Liverpool, England. The house, which was commissioned as a private house, is a Grade II listed building.

== History ==
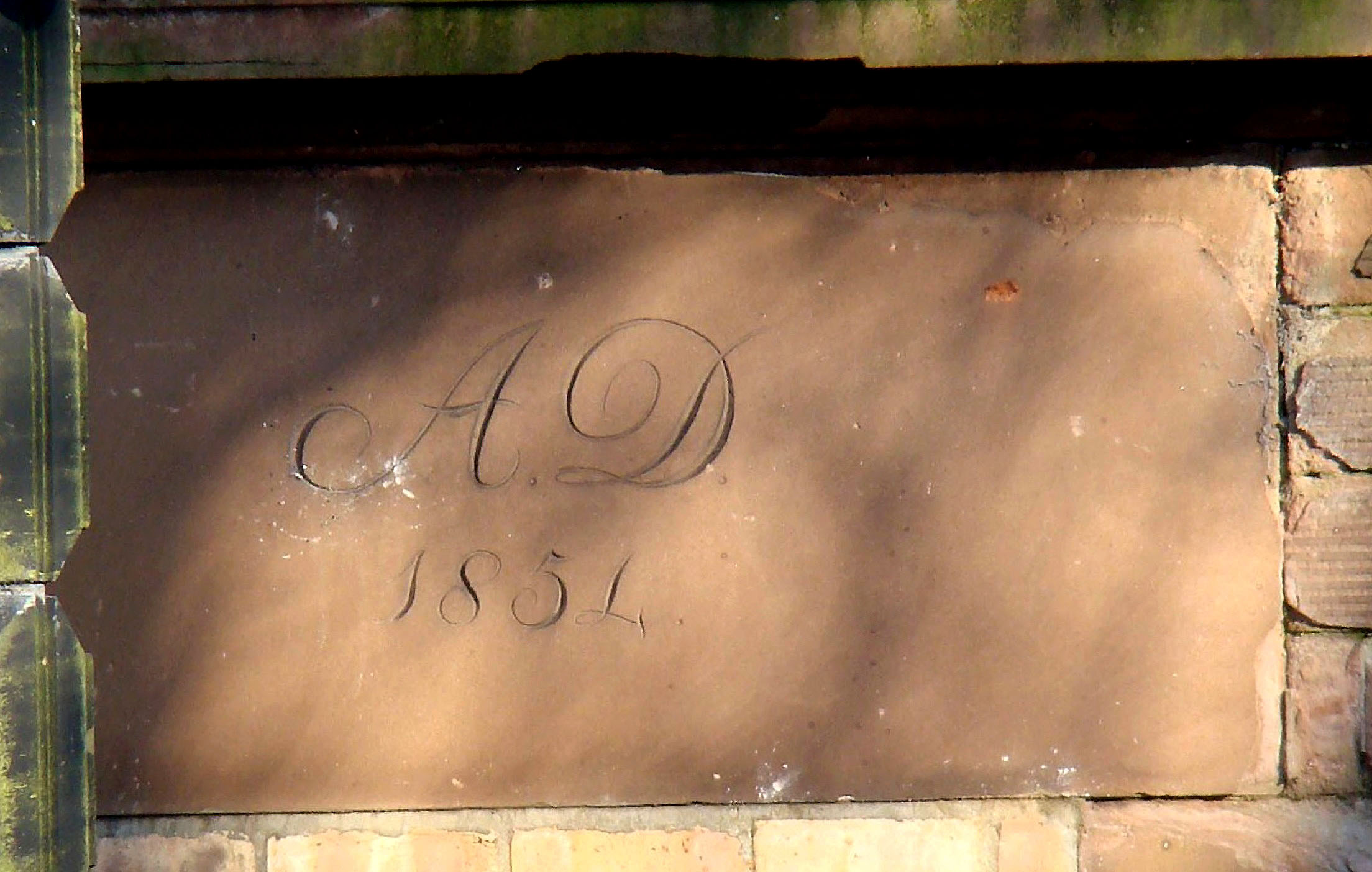
Date stone

The building was commissioned as a private house, probably by the Molyneux family, who were the local landowners. The site they selected was on the east side of Black Horse Lane (now Queens Drive). Construction of the building started in 1851. It was designed in the neoclassical style, built in ashlar stone and was completed in 1854. The design involved an asymmetrical main frontage of five bays facing onto Queens Drive. The first bay was recessed; the second bay contained a four-stage tower, and the right hand section of three bays was slightly projected forward. The tower featured a rounded headed doorway in the first stage, a casement window with an architrave and a cornice in the second stage, a lancet window in the third stage and a bipartite window in the fourth stage, all surmounted by a balustraded parapet. The right-hand section was fenestrated by casement windows with architraves on both floors.

The first resident was Joseph Edwards, a merchant who traded with South America, who moved into the building in 1857. Following Edwards' death in 1878, it was acquired by a banker, William Nutter Kinsman, and his wife, Alice Houghton, who lived there from 1880 until Kinsman's death in 1890. It was then occupied by a corn merchant, Ralph Lyon Broadbent, from 1891 until his death in 1900. The Fourth Church of Christ, Scientist acquired it and transformed it into a place of worship in 1931.

Since the Church of Christ, Scientist moved out in the 1980s, the building has been disused and deteriorating. The building is in a bad state of repair and Liverpool City Council has been in discussions with its owners since 2004 to take action on its state, threatening them with a compulsory purchase order. The owners, Quirefast, claimed in 2016 that they were speaking with potential buyers who were interested in converting the buildings to apartments. As of late 2020, the building remained in a poor state.

In May 2025, the Victorian Society included the building in its list of the 10 most endangered buildings in the country.
