= P&O Nedlloyd =

Ocean-going container shipping line

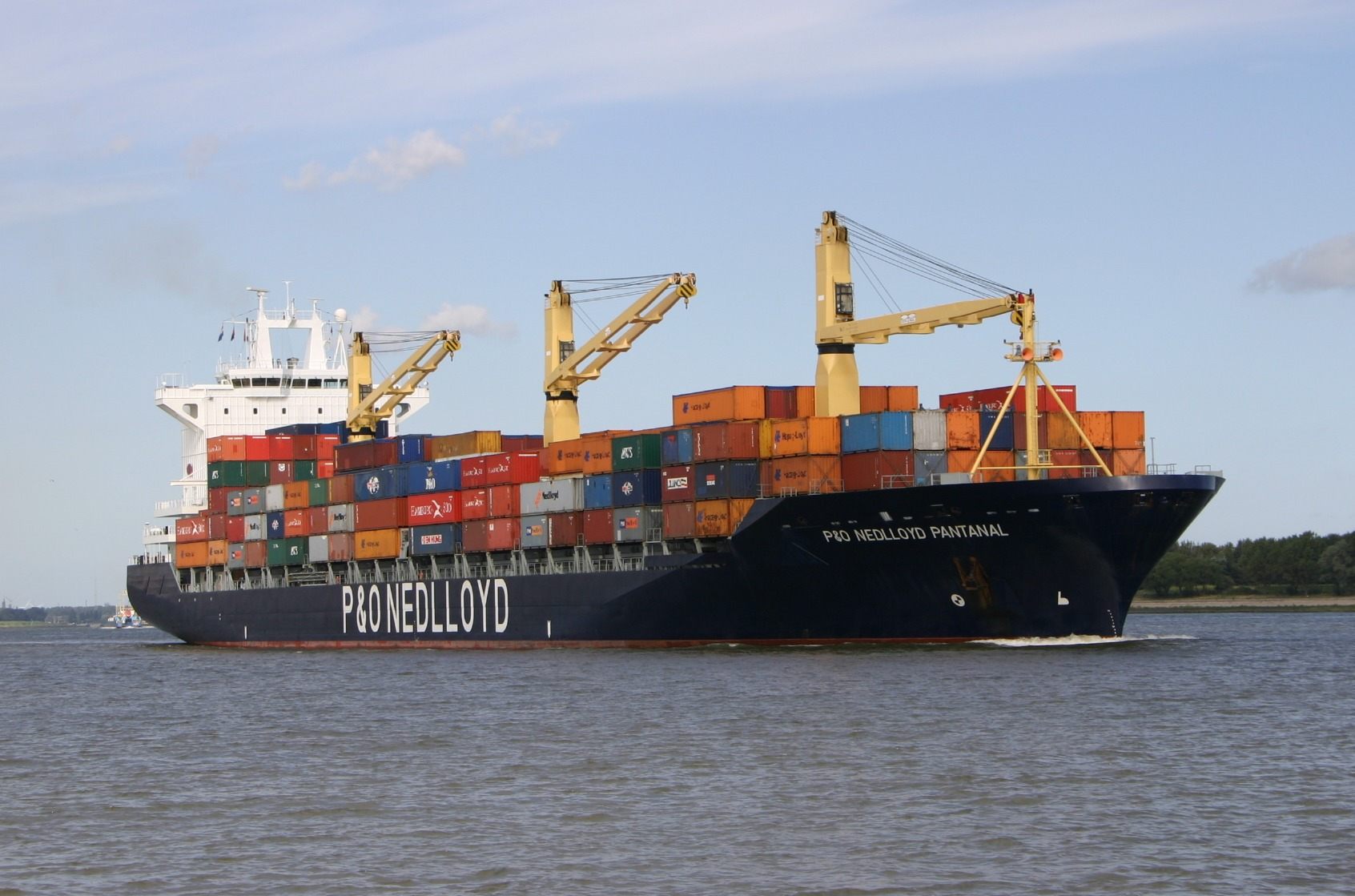
- Industry: Shipping
- Founded: 1997
- Defunct: 2006
- Fate: Taken over by Maersk Line
- Headquarters: Rotterdam, Netherlands
- Area served: Global
- Services: Container transportation
- Website: www.ponl.com

P&O Nedlloyd Container Line Limited was an Anglo-Dutch worldwide ocean-going container shipping line, with dual headquarters in London and Rotterdam. The company was formed in 1997 by the merger of the container-shipping interests of Dutch transportation company Royal Nedlloyd (Nedlloyd Line) and the British maritime shipping giant P&O (P&O Containers).

In 2004, Royal Nedlloyd bought the remaining shares from P&O and the company was listed as Royal P&O Nedlloyd on the Dutch stock exchange. Royal P&O Nedlloyd was acquired by the Maersk in 2005 and was combined with their existing container shipping business Maersk-Sealand to form Maersk Line. As SeaLand was the US-based historic innovator of container shipping, Maersk Line subsequently embodies the Dutch, British as well as Danish and American merchant marine legacy.

== History ==
The company, P&O Nedlloyd, a 50/50 joint venture was formed in December 1996; when P&O Containers Limited (formerly OCL), a British shipping giant merged its container-shipping interests with the Dutch container transportation company, Royal Nedlloyd Lines. P&O Nedlloyd was the largest partner in the Grand Alliance, which also included shippings concerns such as OOCL, Hapag-Lloyd and NYK Lines.

Expanding in 1998, the line purchased Blue Star Line's container business. The company also acquired the container business of Harrison Line (based in the UK). Further expansion came with the buyout of Farrell Lines (US-based) in 2000.

In 2001, after three years of negotiations, an attempt to make P&O Nedlloyd failed. With Philip Nevill Green at the helm Anglo-Dutch boardroom balancing got a different rational and in April 2004 Royal Nedlloyd purchased the 25% shares of P&O Nedlloyd from P&O and exchange the remain 25% shares holds by P&O with 25% shares of the newly formed listed company, makes Royal Nedlloyd is the major shares holder.

The company was listed on the Euronext Amsterdam as Royal P&O Nedlloyd NV. By the end of 2003 Royal P&O Nedlloyd was operating its worldwide business according to standardised global processes and a single IT application called 'FOCUS', which included all commercial, operational as well as financial activities.

In May 2005 Maersk announced plans to purchase P&O Nedlloyd for 2.3 billion euros. At the time of the acquisition, P&O Nedlloyd had 6% of the global industry market share, and Maersk-Sealand had 12%. The combined company would be about 18% of world market share. Maersk completed the buyout of the company on 13 August 2005, Royal P&O Nedlloyd shares terminated trading on 5 September. In February 2006, the new combined entity adopted the name "Mærsk Line". At the time the company was folded into A.P. Moller, it owned and chartered a fleet of over 160 vessels. Its container fleet, consisting of owned and leased vessels, had a capacity of 635,000 twenty-foot equivalent units (TEU). Royal P&O Nedlloyd N.V. had 13,000 employees in 146 countries.

By the end of 2006, Maersk global market share had fallen from 18.2% to 16.8%, at the same time, the next two largest carriers increased their market share, MSC went from 8.6% to 9.5% and CMA CGM from 5.6% to 6.5%. In January 2008, Maersk Line announced drastic reorganisational measures.

Three years after the take over of P&O Nedlloyd the Maersk Line corporate streamline strategy, based on the Lean Six Sigma process principles, they follow the P&O Nedlloyd legacy, which at the time of its takeover already had a system of globally standardised business processes and one single IT application to support this.

Common consensus within the industry viewed that the desire of the P&O Nedlloyd board to maximise personal capital and thus consolidate the company's needs based within the desires of what the market required in the mid 2000s culminated in the jettison of one the Country's most recognizable and most famous company brands as being a source of great disappointment. It was privately noted that at the time The Queen and other members of the British Royal family were concerned by the impact this would have on the United Kingdom's Merchant Navy at the time

== Heritage ==
Items of P&O Nedlloyd and its predecessors' historical heritage are displayed at both the Maritime Museum Rotterdam and the National Maritime Museum in London.

== Gallery ==
P&O Nedlloyd photo gallery

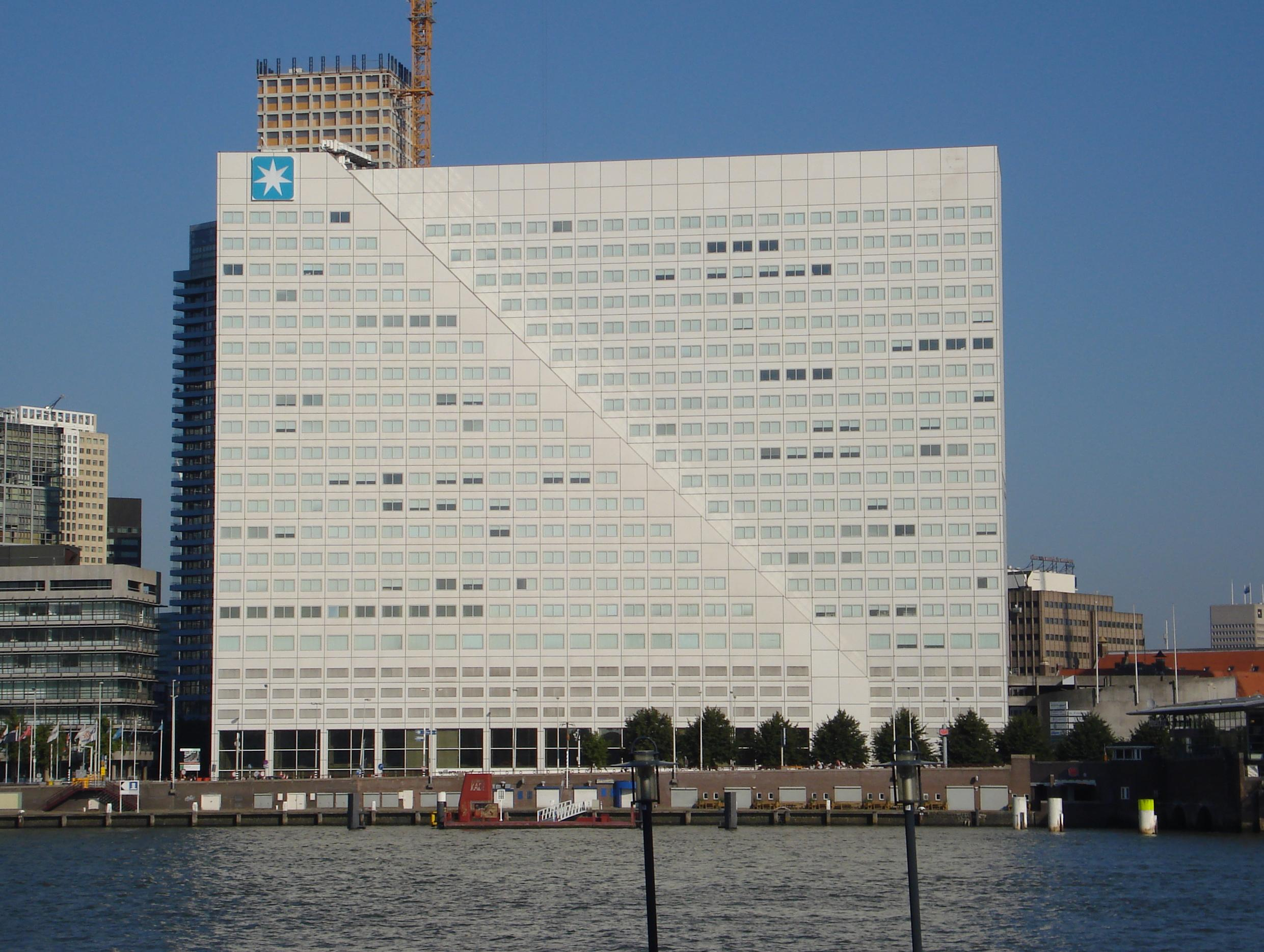
The Willemswerf building, the former Nedlloyd and P&O Nedlloyd corporate headquarters in Rotterdam. Currently the home of Maersk Lines' European operations.

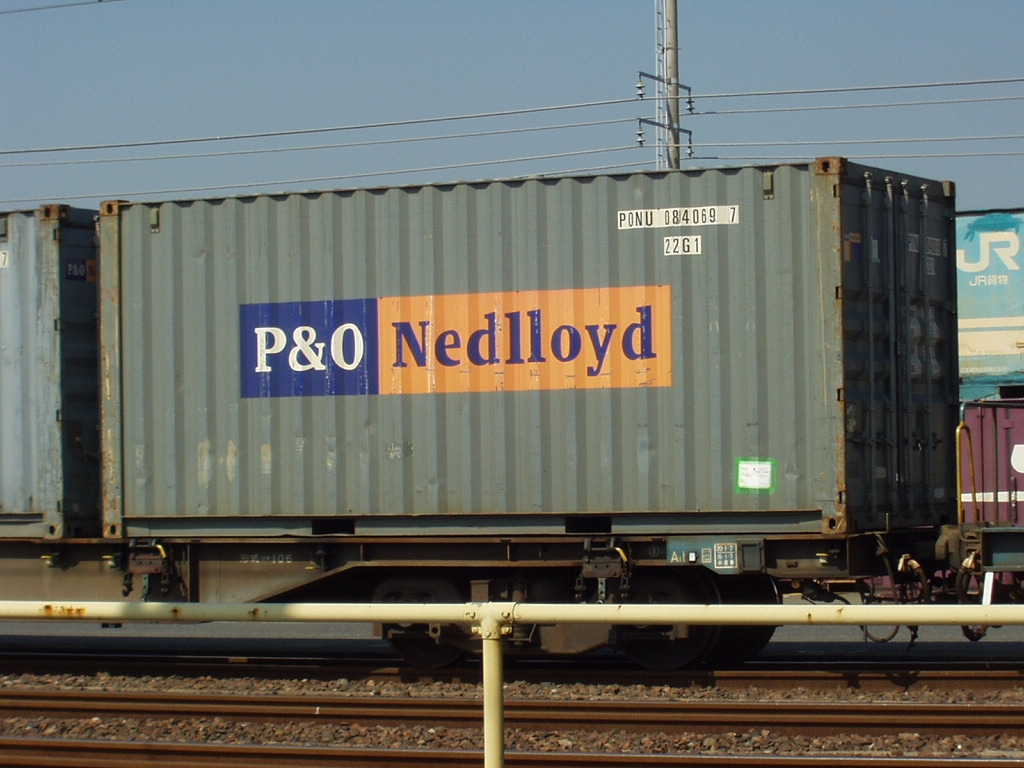
P&O Nedlloyd 20 foot dry container (22G1)

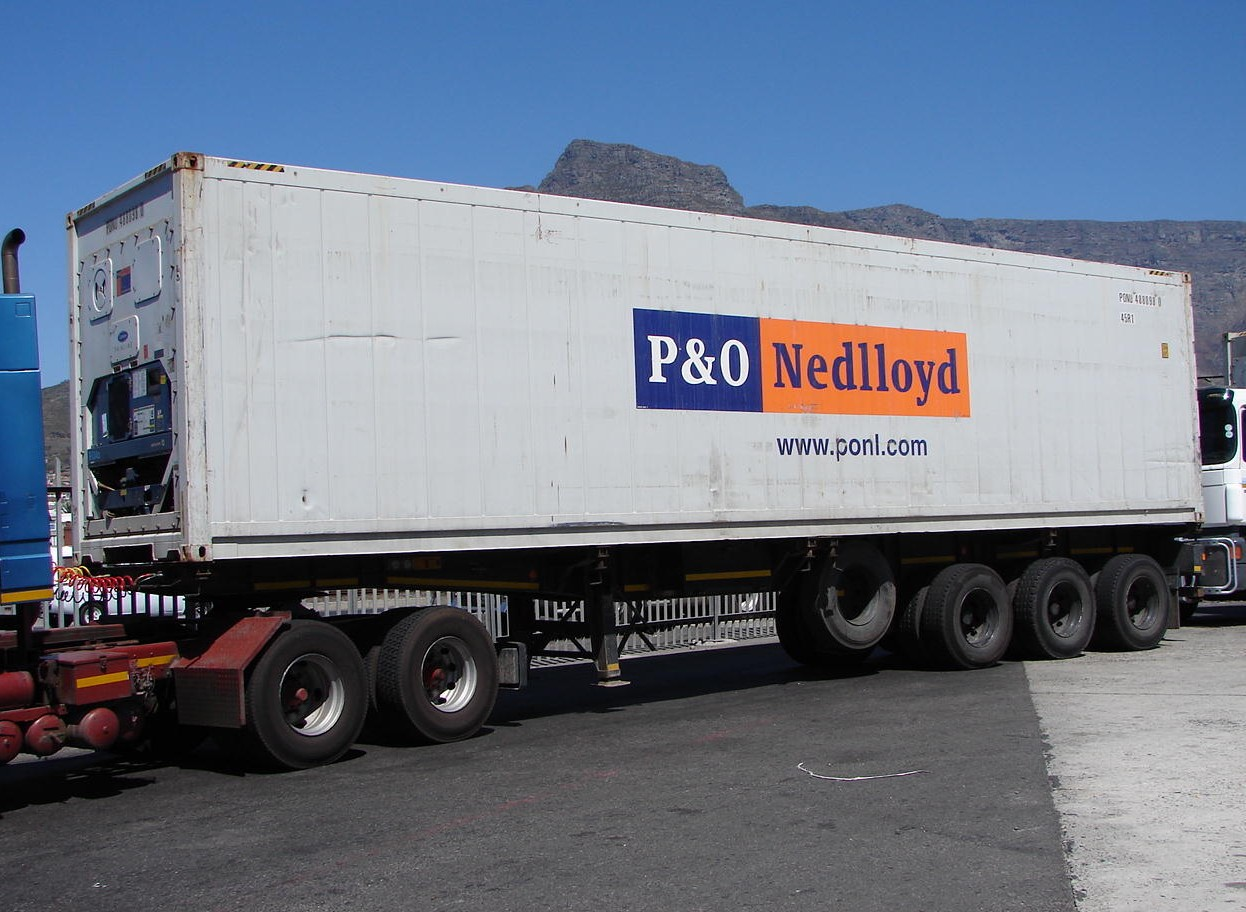
P&O Nedlloyd 40 foot hi-cube reefer container (45R1)

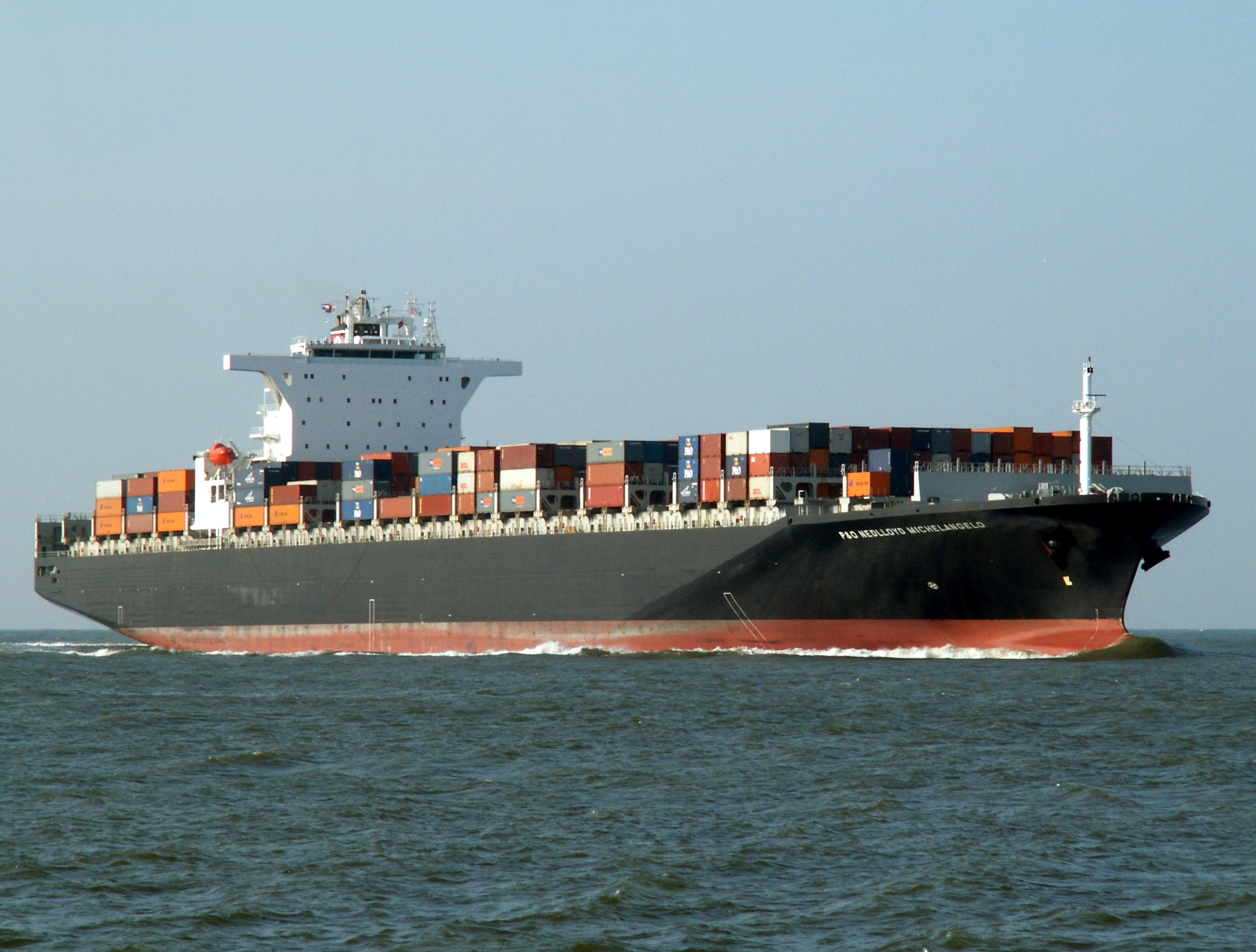
P&O Nedlloyd Michelangelo arriving at Rotterdam, August 2006

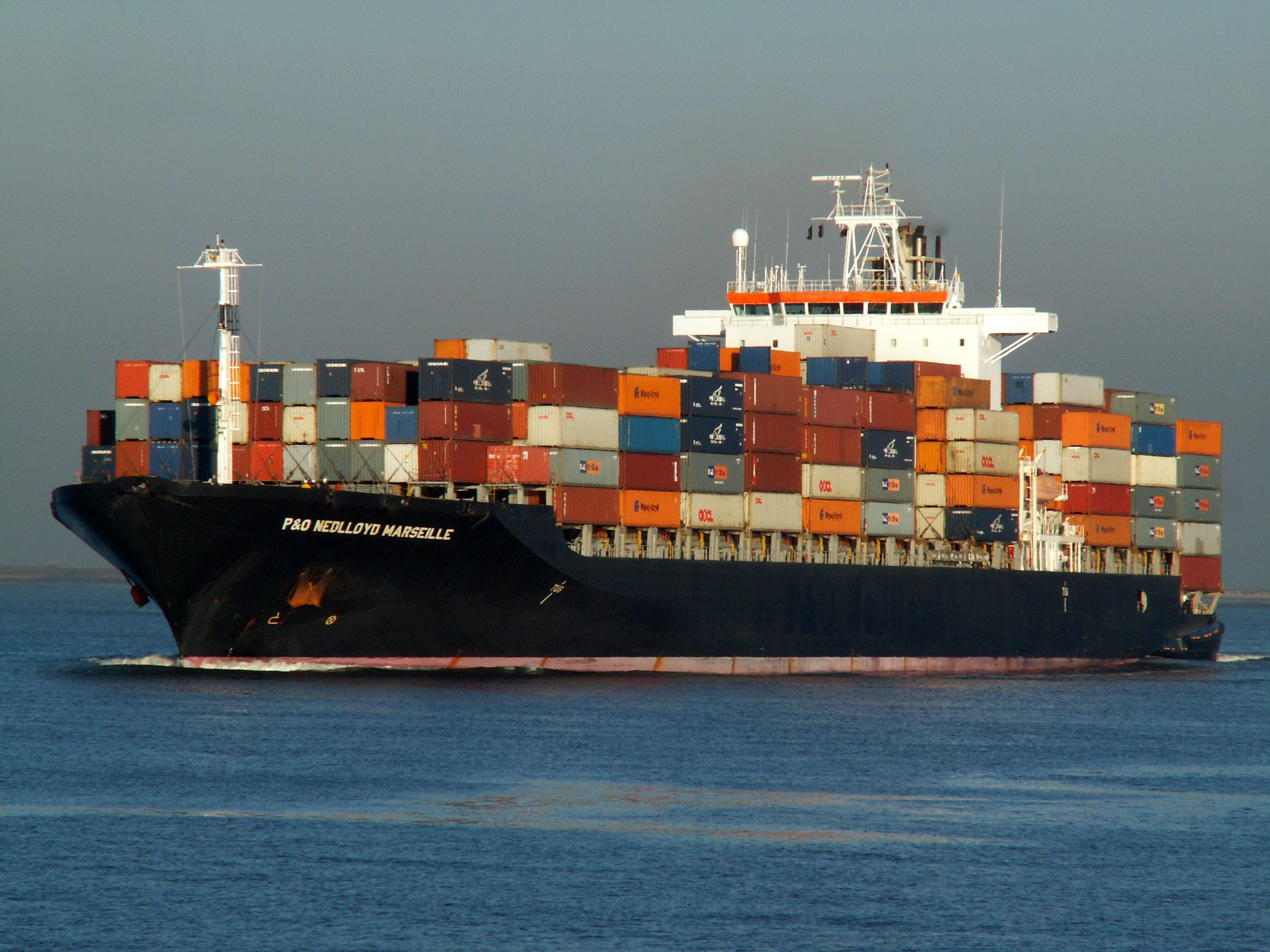
P&O Nedlloyd Marseille at Antwerp, September 2005
