= Knock for Knock =

- Second City Firsts episode
- Episode no.: Series 7 Episode 2
- Directed by: Mike Leigh
- Written by: Mike Leigh
- Original air date: 1976
- Running time: 30 minutes

"Knock for Knock" is the second episode of the seventh series of the BBC television series Second City Firsts starring Sam Kelly, and Anthony O'Donnell. The episode was written and directed by Mike Leigh and aired in 1976. After broadcast, the tape was wiped and no copies are believed to exist. "Knock for knock" refers to an arrangement between insurers where they pay out claims despite the other insurer's customer being liable - this avoids administration and court costs.

== Plot ==
The film concerns a man called Mr. Purvis (O'Donnell) trying to arrange car insurance after he has been convicted of drunk driving. Kelly plays Mr. Bowes, the deranged insurance broker.

== Cast ==
- Sam Kelly as Mr. Bowes
- Anthony O'Donnell as Mr. Purvis
- Meryl Hampton as Marilyn

== Production ==
Like Leigh's previous film "The Permissive Society", "Knock for Knock" was produced by BBC Birmingham as part of their Second City Firsts strand. In an online Q&A for The Guardian in 2000, Leigh said it was 'experimental for the time' as it was recorded in one take with multiple cameras. The tape was wiped by the BBC after broadcast and no copies are believed to exist. According to Leigh, it was 'wiped by a crackpot committee because of a "shortage of space".' He went on to say he would pay 'good money' if anyone could find a copy.

== Critical reception ==
The film received a very positive review by Time Out who said it was 'the funniest thing on the box for months' and that Kelly gave the performance of the decade. Leigh himself described Kelly's performance as 'incredible and hilarious'.
