= Mara River =

River in Mara Region, Tanzania and Narok County, Kenya

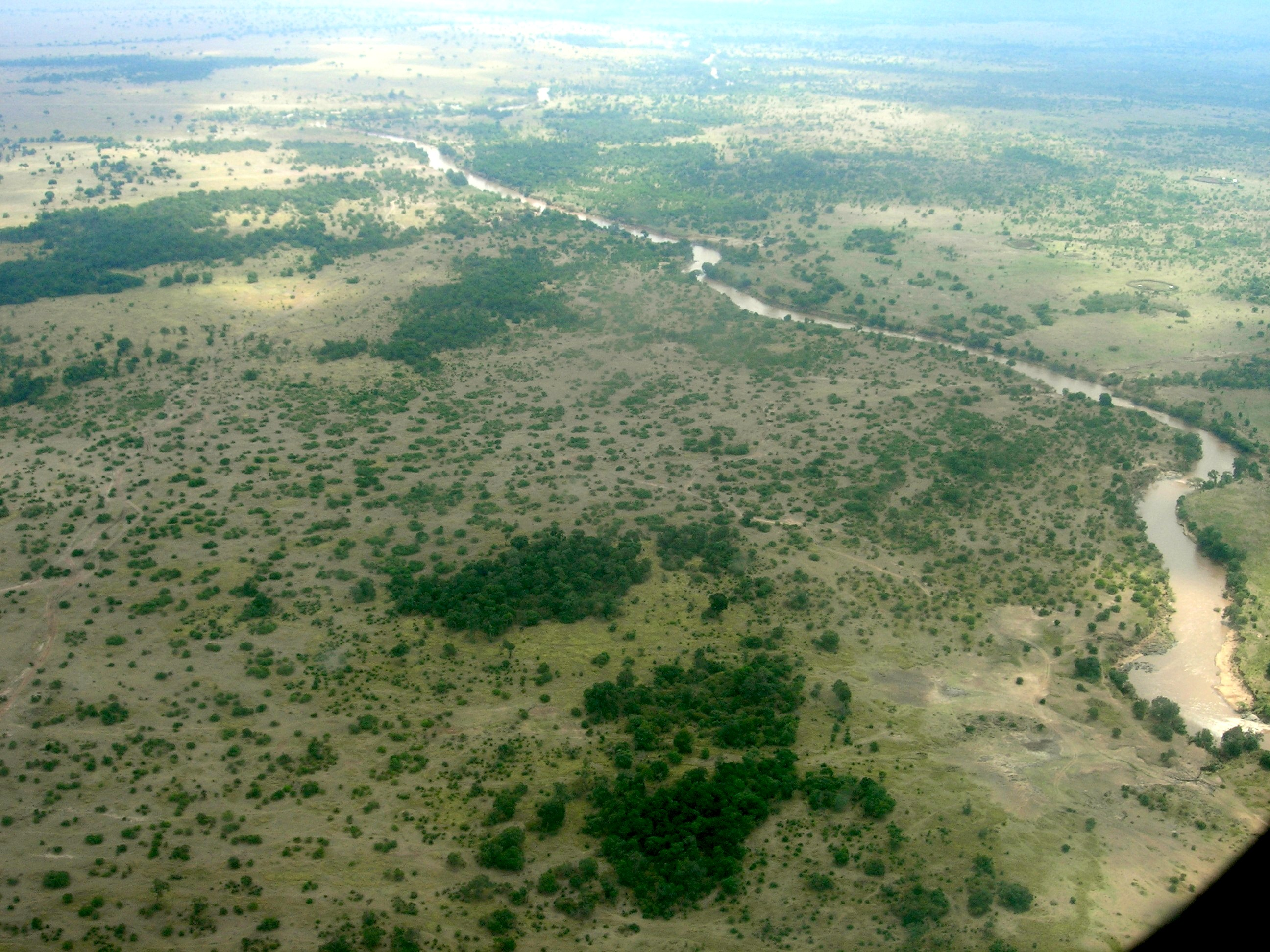
- The Mara River in Kenya

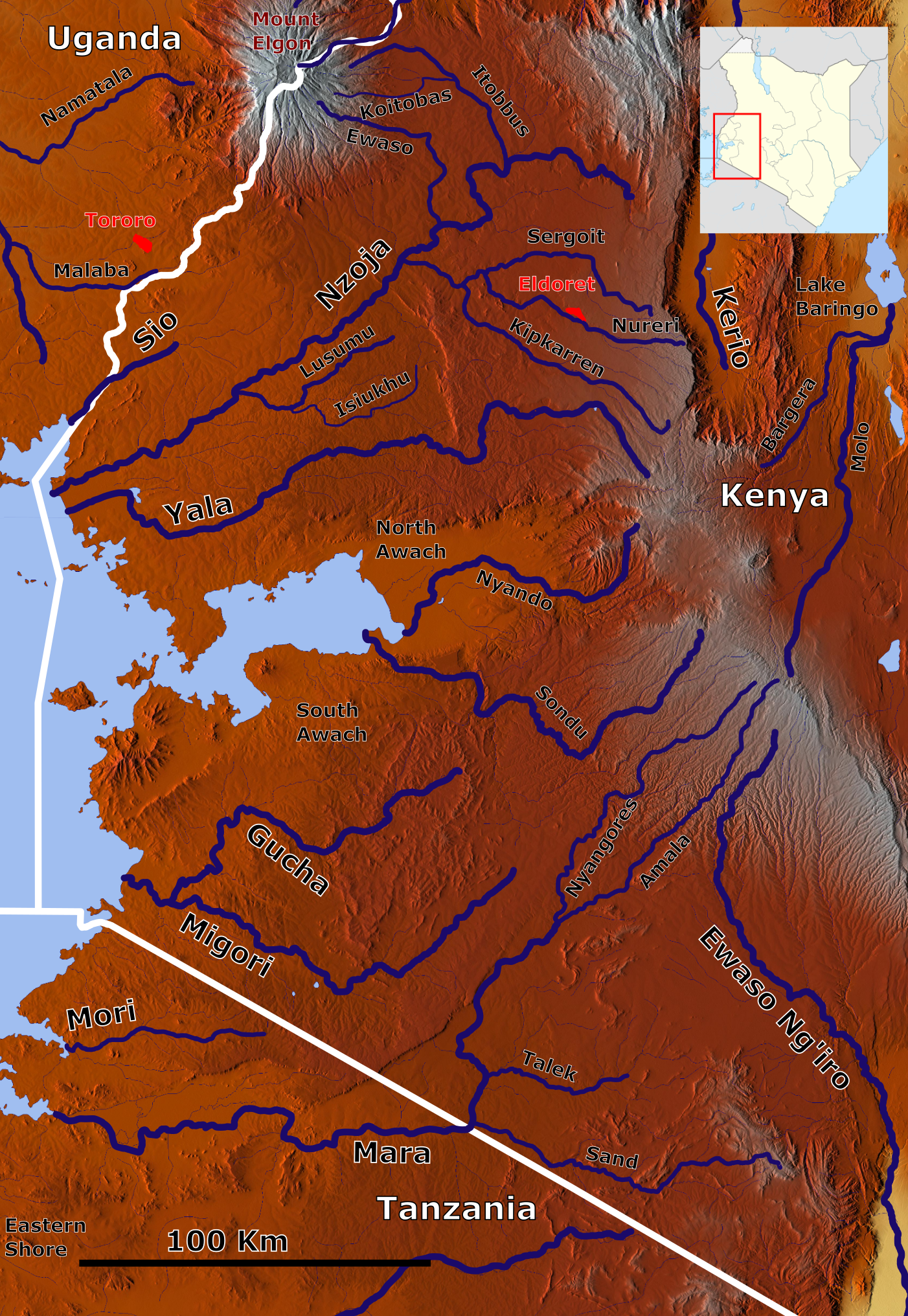
- Mara River (bottom)

Location
- Country: Kenya
- County: Narok County
- Country: Tanzania
- Region: Mara Region

Physical characteristics
- Source: Mau escarpment
  - location: Narok County, Kenya
  - elevation: 3,000 m (9,800 ft)
- Mouth: Lake Victoria
  - location: Mara Region, Tanzania
  - coordinates: 1°30′50″S 33°55′56″E
- Length: 395 km (245 mi)
- Basin size: 13,393 km^{2} (5,171 mi^{2})
- Discharge
  - location: Near mouth
  - average: (Period: 1960–2000)41.7 m^{3}/s (1,470 cu ft/s)

Basin features
- Progression: Lake Victoria → Victoria Nile → Albert Nile → White Nile → Nile → Mediterranean Sea
- River system: Nile River
- Tributaries
  - left: Amala, Talek, Sand, Somoche
  - right: Nyangores, Thigithe

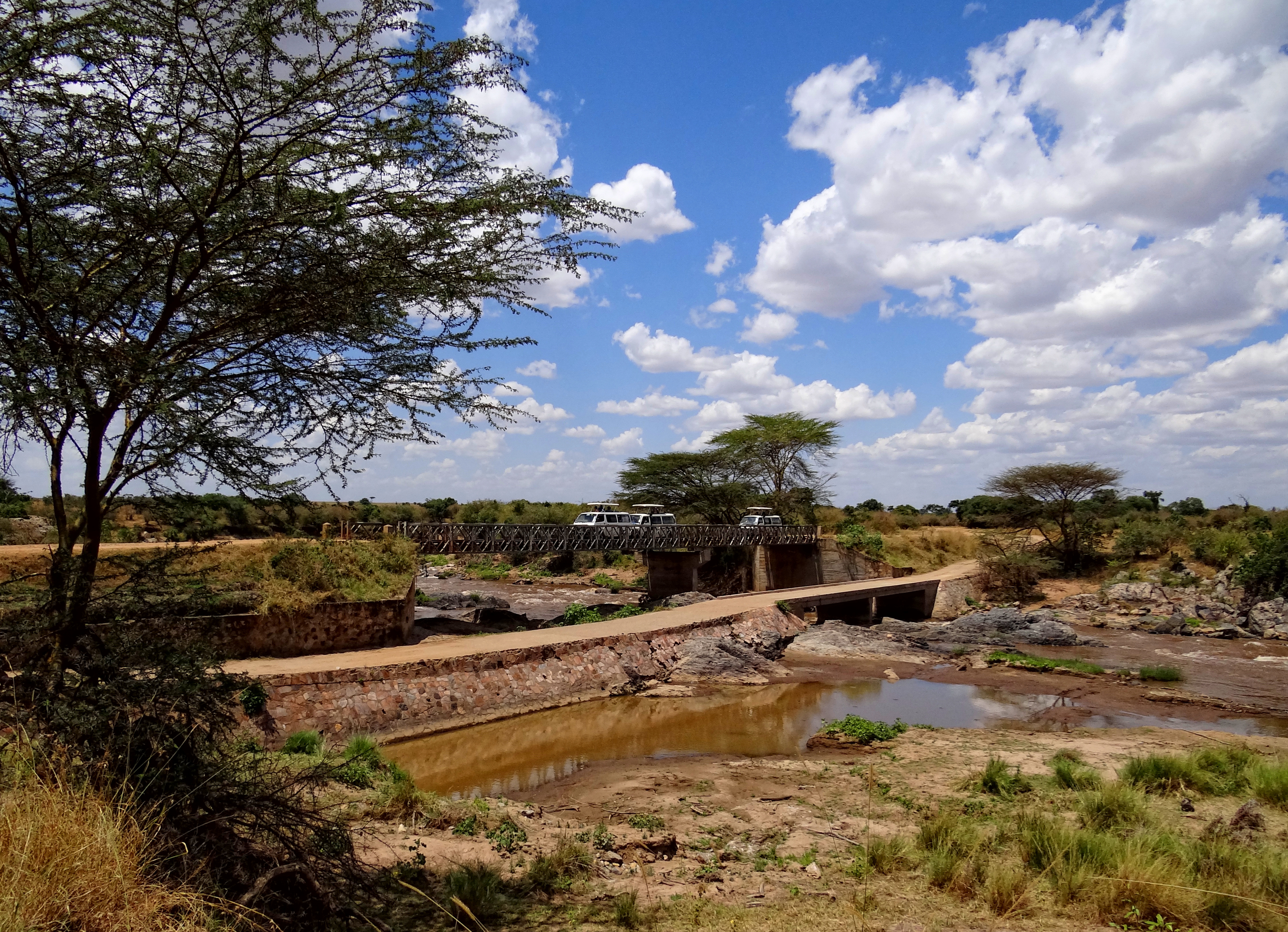
Bridges on the border of Kenya and Tanzania

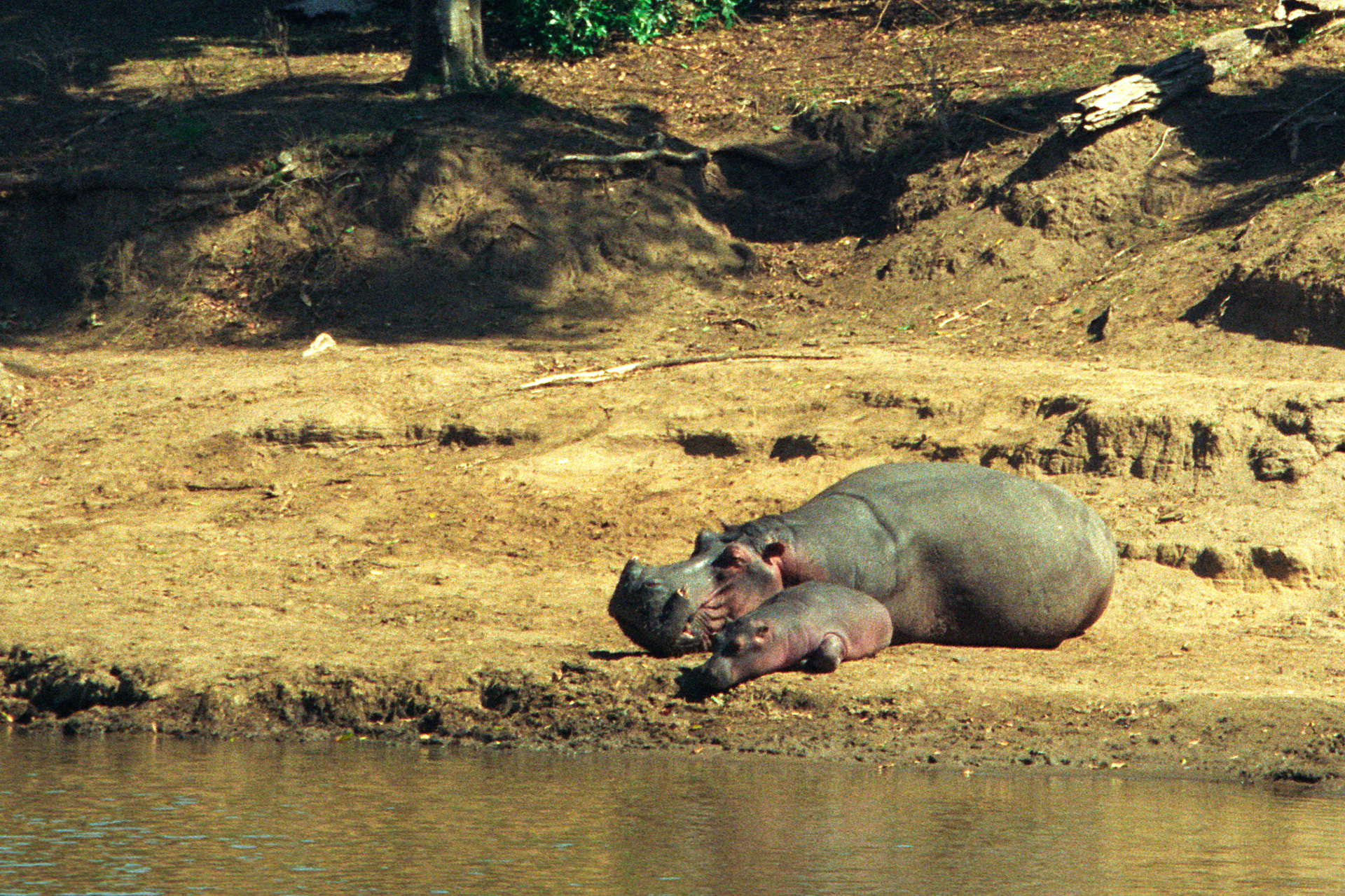
Hippo with calf, Mara River, Kenya

The Mara River is a river that begins flowing from Narok County in Kenya and ends in Mara Region in Tanzania. It lies across the migration path of ungulates in the Maasai Mara/Serengeti ecosystem.

== The River's flow ==
The Mara River basin covers a surface of 13,504 km^{2} (5,214 sq mi), of which approximately 65% is located in Kenya and 35% in Tanzania. From its sources in the Kenyan highlands, the river flows for about 395 km (245 mi) and originates from the Mau Escarpment and drains into Lake Victoria. The basin can be roughly divided into four land use and/or administrative units.

== The Mara's regions ==
The Mau Escarpment: The Mara River originates from the Napuiyapi swamp (2932 m), with the main perennial tributaries being the Amala and the Nyangores, which drain from the western Mau Escarpment. This part of the basin supports besides forests, both small-scale agriculture (less than 10 acres) and medium-size farms (often tea farms up to 40 acres).

The Kenyan Rangelands: In this area, the Amala and Nyangores rivers flow out of the Mau Escarpment and converge to form the Mara River. The river then meanders further through open savannah grasslands that is mostly governed by Maasai group ranches and used as pasture for livestock and for both small — and large-scale agriculture (more than 40 acres). The basins of four important tributaries to the Mara (the Talek, Engare, Sand and Engito rivers) are also located in this area, together with some upland areas like the Loita Hills.

The Protected areas: Eventually the river flows into the world-famous Masai Mara National Reserve, where it merges with three of the four mentioned tributaries. On the Kenya-Tanzania border, the river flows into the Serengeti National Park and is joined by the fourth major tributary: the Sand (or Longaianiet) River. In these wildlife parks human activity is restricted to wildlife viewing.

Downstream in Mara Region Tanzania: Just after the Mara River flows out of Ikorongo Game Reserve (which borders Serengeti National Park) it meanders sharply northwards. At the location where the river meanders into the southwestern direction again the main channel is lost in different streams, which feed the downstream Mara Wetlands. These streams and wetlands continue for about 70 km (43 mi) downstream. In this part of the basin human and livestock densities are high and small-scale subsistence agriculture is the main land use. The Mara River basin is one of the ten drainage basins that feed into Lake Victoria and is therefore functionally and ecologically related to the socio-economic activities in Lake Victoria and along the Nile River.

== Altitudes and ranges ==
The altitudes in the basin range from 2,932 m around the sources in the Mau Escarpment to 1,134 m around Lake Victoria. The amount of precipitation varies according to these altitudes. The Mau Escarpment receives most rainfall with a mean annual rainfall between 1,000 and 1,750 mm. The transboundary middle savannah grasslands receive an average between 900 and 1,000 mm, and the Kenyan lower Loita Hills and the area around Lake Victoria only about 700 and 850 mm rain per year. On top of this rainfall variability in space, the region is also known for its rainfall variability in time, which means that the different areas all receive variable amounts of rainfall over the year. The rainfall seasons are bi-modal, with the long rains starting in mid-March to June with a peak in April, while the short rains occur between September and December.

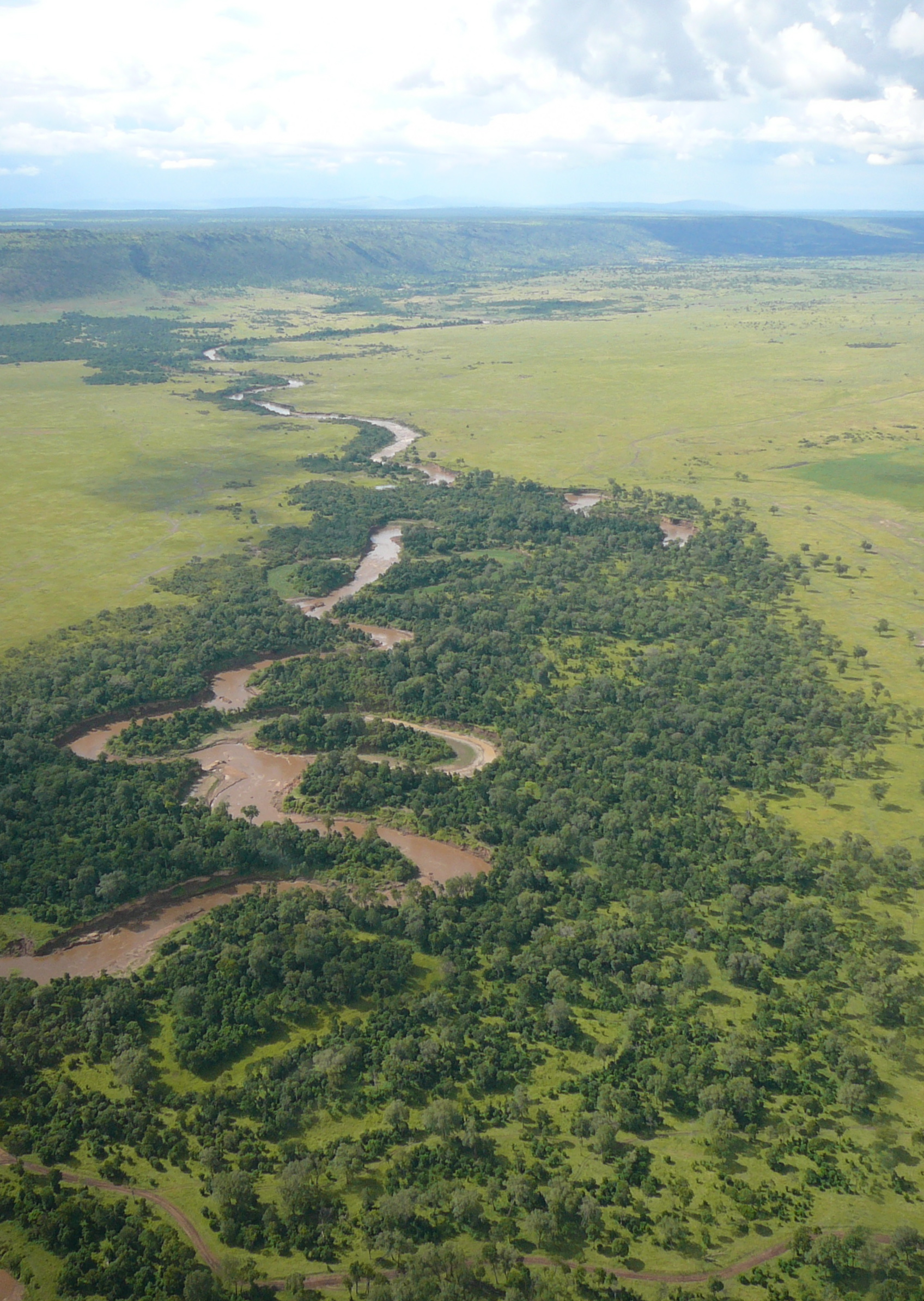
Mara river in Narok County

== The Mara's effects ==
The river is a vital source to grazing animals within the reserve. Although during the dry season it may often appear shallow, it may swell to up to twice its normal size after heavy rainfall. This can create rapids in the river, which may lead to shortage of food for predators that cannot cross the river to hunt.

== See also ==
- Nile River
- Nzoia River
- Yala River
- Maasai Mara
- Serengeti National Park
- Mara Region
- Narok County
