= Rural tourism =

Form of tourism

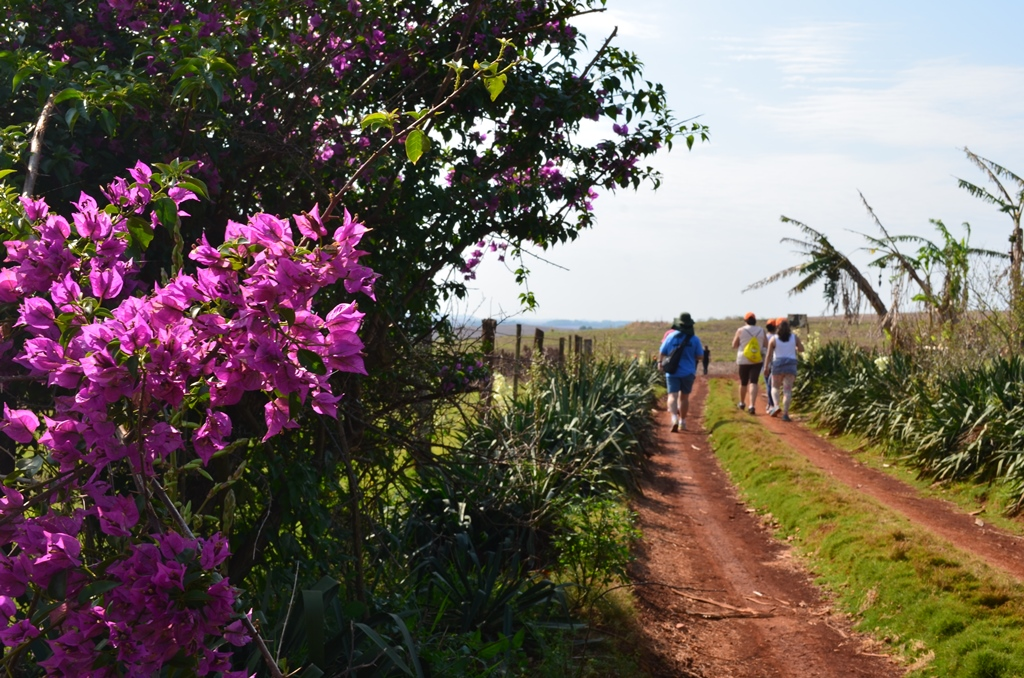
Tourists visiting a rural area in Paraná, Brazil

Rural tourism is a form of tourism that focuses on actively participating in a rural lifestyle. Activities in rural tourism often promote local agricultural or fishing practices, art, culture, heritage, and other aspects of local life. It can be a variant of ecotourism, which engages tourists with the local environment, often focusing on sustainable practices, conservation management and environmental education.

Rural tourism activities contribute to rural community development by providing economic benefits, creating new employment opportunities for local residents, supporting local businesses and providing revenue for the government. In developed nations, rural tourism can play a significant role in local economies. In the United States, niche tourism programs such as wine tours, agritourism, and seasonal events are prominent in rural areas.

Global rural tourism organizations showcase an existing interest among tourists to visit rural areas and experience the rural lifestyle. World Wide Opportunities on Organic Farms (WWOOF) is a global organization that promotes sustainable agriculture. It connects volunteers with organic farms, providing them with opportunities to live on site and learn about sustainable farming practices.

Community-based ecotourism (CBE) is a model that requires community involvement, prioritizing collaboration with local communities during the planning process and active management of ecotourism sites. Organizations like TIES promote sustainable practices that benefit both hosts and tourists.

== Relevance in developed nations ==
=== United States ===
Many niche tourism programs are located in rural areas. From wine tours and eco-tourism, to agritourism and seasonal events, tourism can be a viable economic component in rural community development. According to the USDA, Cooperative State, Education and Extension Service, "Tourism is becoming increasingly important to the U.S. economy. A conservative estimate from the Federal Reserve Board in Kansas, based on 2000 data, shows that basic travel and tourism industries accounted for 3.6 percent of all U.S. employment. Even more telling, data from the Travel Industry Association of America indicate that 1 out of every 18 people in the U.S. has a job directly resulting from travel expenditures."

The publication Promoting Tourism in Rural America explains the need for planning and marketing rural communities, as well as weighing the pros and cons of the impacts of tourism. Local citizen participation is helpful and should be included in starting any kind of a tourism program. Being prepared when planning tourism can assist in a successful program that enhances the community.

=== Israel ===
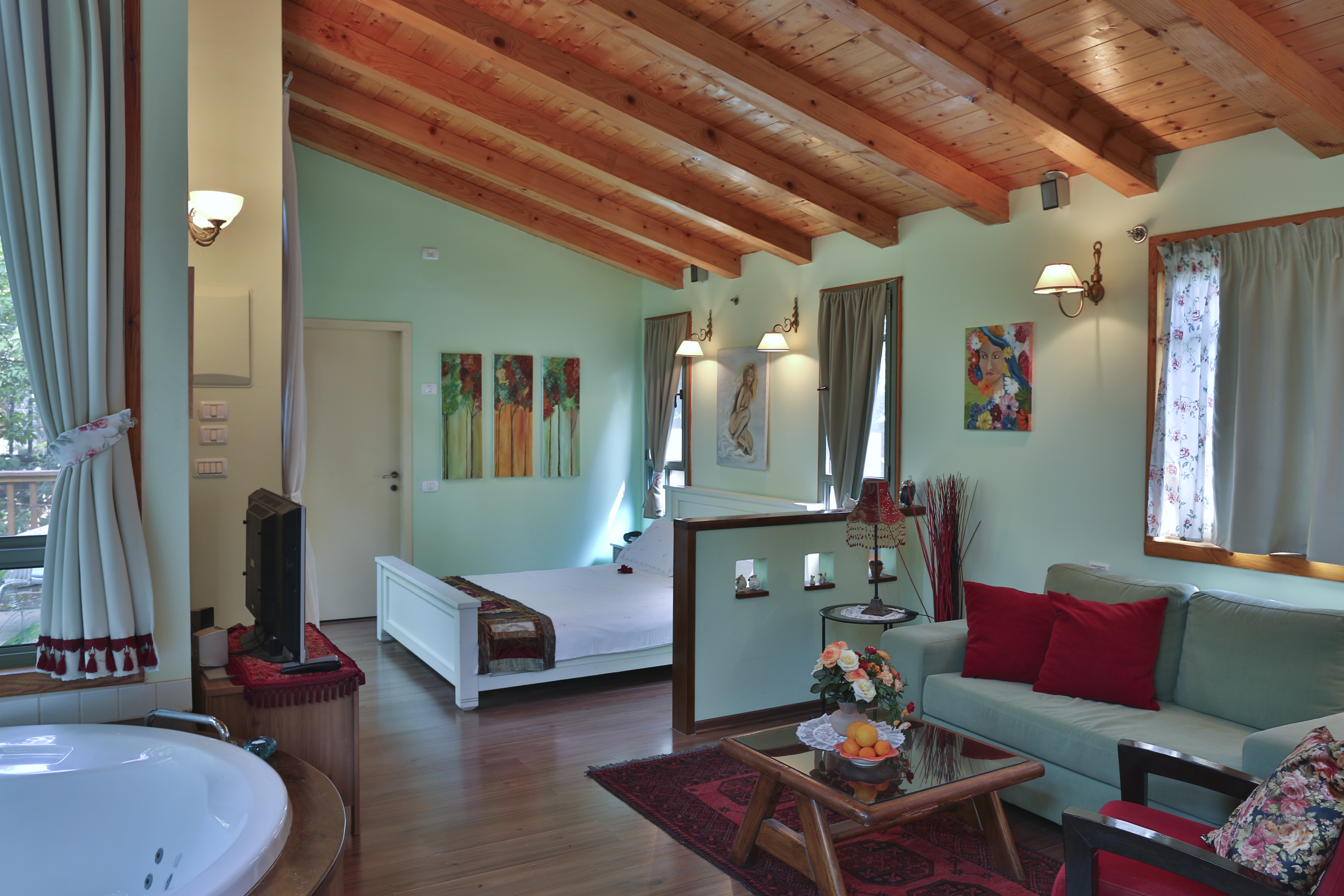
Rural tourism in Israel includes accommodations ranging from basic converted buildings to luxurious log cabins (Zimmers) equipped with modern amenities.

Rural tourism in Israel has experienced significant growth since the late 1980s, becoming an important economic activity in rural areas. Initially, this growth was driven by farmers seeking alternative sources of income due to declining agricultural profits. The industry now includes thousands of accommodation units spread across numerous villages, including semi-cooperatives (Moshavim) and collectives (Kibbutzim). These accommodations range from basic converted buildings to luxurious log cabins equipped with modern amenities. This diversification has attracted a steady stream of domestic tourists, making rural tourism a substantial contributor to the local economy.

Government support has been crucial to the development of rural tourism in Israel. The Israel Ministry of Tourism began its support in the early 1990s, and today, both the Ministry of Tourism and the Ministry of Agriculture, along with various non-governmental organizations, play a role in sustaining the industry.

== Community ecotourism ==
The International Ecotourism Society (TIES) defines ecotourism as "responsible travel to natural areas that conserves the environment and improves the well-being of local people." TIES is an example of a nonprofit organization dedicated to assisting companies in developing ecotourism practices and promoting sustainable community development. Ecotourism provides an alternative form of travel to mass tourism. Mass tourism is the idea of visiting a place with minimal responsibility to the local community and environment. Tourism, the world's largest industry of more than 10% of total employment and 11% of global GDP, is also a quickly growing industry as "total tourist trips are predicted to increase to 1.6 billion by 2020". In order to accommodate these rising needs in the tourism industry, there must be a shift within this industry. One in particular is the need to protect the environment and respect the local culture.

According to the World Tourism Organization, ecotourism is growing three times faster than the tourism industry. This implies the already changing phenomenon occurring in traveling. Similarly, the World Conservation Union goes one step further in defining ecotourism to include enjoying and appreciating nature, have low negative visitor impact, and providing socio-economic involvement to the local populations. As ecotourism is growing, it is also focusing on especially vulnerable locations to climate change. In a neoliberalism theory, ecotourism is a win-win for both the host and tourist. This is because there is an effort for conservation when jobs are available outside of activities such as logging that harm the environment and the intrinsic value of the environment is taken into consideration. Additionally, ecotourism enhances social capital for both the host and tourist when engaging in social interaction and learning about other cultures.

However, because ecotourism is most popular in vulnerable environments, it may unintentionally exploit the community causing a serious social justice issue. The idea of community ecotourism is placing the tourism activities in the hands of the local community. It addresses the needs of the tourism businesses to minimize negative impacts and maximize positive impacts in all three parts of the community – social, economic, and environmental. Community ecotourism resolves one issue with ecotourism in particular, the input of the community hosting the tourism. Governments and outside agencies have pushed communities into hosting tourists which can sometimes cause more harm if the community is not prepared without relevant knowledge, leadership, or capacity. An example of such occurrence is in Montego Bay in which international organizations brought tourists to already westernized sites, which harmed this degraded environment. Another example is the case of Papua New Guinea's Crater Mountain. Setting aside their ethnic tension, the clans planned a tourist lodge for two years that the government denied in five minutes. The lack of collusion among the local clans and the government created tension and failure for all parties. With community ecotourism, the community itself primarily sees the venture to success and receives the economic benefit, rather than government or third party organizations.

As a whole, the rise in demand of tourism to exotic places as they become more accessible provides an opportunity for vulnerable and economically impoverished communities. In traditional tourism, these communities are often exploited and their resources depleted. It also includes the social inequities when considering the power in the host–guest relationship. Community ecotourism empowers the relationship of the host and guest so that both can learn from a different culture and how to maneuver such differences. When addressed properly, equitable relationships blossom in the national and global sphere. Unlike traditional tourism, this alternative tourism experience enables people to engage positively in the community's way of life and learn how they interact with the environment. Community ecotourism can act as a solution to social justice issues that arise with the tourism industry in respect to the economy, environment, and culture.

=== Benefits of community ecotourism ===
Generally, success is the benefits outweighing the costs. A more concrete measure of success for ecotourism is ensuring that the tourism industry operates within the location's capacity to handle such activities in the three areas of ecotourism – economy, environment, and culture. One such form of capacity is economic capacity so that the tourism industry does not displace sustainable local economic activity already in place. Additionally, there is an environmental carrying capacity, the limit at which the environment is not degraded from tourism. This is especially important as many ecotourism locations are in locations vulnerable to climate change, such as along the coast. There is also the idea of cultural capacity in which the tourism industry remains authentic and can maintain local practices. With addressing these three capacity measures, many problems mass tourism places on the host community are resolved.

==== Economic ====
In contrast with traditional tourism, community ecotourism is often a tool for economic development to promote both capital inflow and employment opportunities to the community. Thus, it is often targeting more impoverished areas where implemented. It encourages entrepreneurship for local members to organize the community in implementing and running successful community-based ecotourism enterprises. Both financial and social capital is placed in the indigenous community, driving further enhancements of the community ecotourism program. This capital inflow can then be used to help the development of infrastructure, education, and health practices. Community-based ecotourism places an emphasis on local businesses and reinforces supporting local endeavors. Not only does the capital increase, the intrinsic value of the environment increases. In Zanzibar, the idea of ecotourism has enabled entrepreneurs to give tours of their home villages and use the revenue to support themselves as well as give back to the community. It has also helped development in conservational ways including increasing investment in solar energy. As a whole, community-based ecotourism can overall increase the economic value of a previously impoverished area through providing dignified jobs and capital into the local economy.

==== Environmental ====
Along with economic value, community ecotourism enhances the value of the environment for both the host and the traveler. As a result, community ecotourism becomes an incentive for conservation. For the community, their environment becomes a showcase to the tourist and brings a greater desire to maintain it. In mass tourism, the average tourist holds little responsibility in the impact they have on the environment and often depletes resources. Community ecotourism gives the tourist a greater stake in conservation efforts because of their involvement in the local culture. Community ecotourism becomes a potential solution to bring social justice to those suffering from side effects of mass tourism in locations most vulnerable to climate change. The Galapagos Islands was one of the initial ecotourism destinations. As the programs have continued to evolve in combatting ecotourism issues, specifically maintaining cultural capacity, one of the main findings from community ecotourism are the programs associated with environmental conservation. When visiting national parks, guides must be with the tourists to ensure they stay on the paths and do not harm the environment during nature walks. One in particular sets tourists on projects to help with environmental restoration, economic development projects, and biodiversity conservation. These "travel philanthropists" are more involved tourists who want to appreciate the natural beauty of the destination from a completely different viewpoint. The ecotourism model on a community-based level enables conservation efforts to come from both the tourist and the community to maximize results.

==== Sociocultural ====
The sociocultural aspect of ecotourism is that the local tourist becomes more engaged in the community and their culture. This can be from learning a religious tradition or supporting a local handicraft. Tourism can at times force more injustices on the host community. It inculcates a sense of inequality in the relationships if the tourist feels they have superior knowledge. Community-based ecotourism places more responsibility on the tourist to learn from the other culture. For example, in South Africa, community ecotourism has been especially beneficial after the apartheid because of a renewed attention towards local cultures that are selling traditional handicrafts and showing cultural tours. The community-based ecotourist is often more interested in engaging with the local community. This can also entail building relationships and decreasing the social gap. Specifically, engagement in nationalism, socioeconomic conditions, and similar age groups can help narrow the social gap and decrease stereotypes. This leads to a more positive cultural understanding on both sides. This effect can even go beyond the tourist's journey. After visiting such communities and learning about their livelihood, studies have found that people gain a newfound activism to contribute back to the community. This socio-cultural connection with the community can in return bring about greater resources to this community to help promote education, conservation, disease prevention, and other needs. It is through the sociocultural aspect that enhances the tourist's engagement with the economy and environment to maximize the overall community-based ecotourism experience.

=== Criticisms ===
While under the neoliberalism theory, ecotourism is an overall winning situation, there are many issues associated with ecotourism when poorly implemented. Community ecotourism is a solution to many of the flaws detailed.

==== Inherently flawed ====
Compared to responsible tourism and voluntourism, there is an added importance on respect for the environment and being environmentally sustainable while traveling. By definition, travel inherently harms the environment by getting to the location, using more resources than the location is used to, and producing more waste than normal. It adds an overall stress to areas most vulnerable to global warming, such as coastlines. One tourism spot that has struggled to implement community ecotourism is Tanzania. Tanzania practices a kind of ecotourism that focuses exclusively on the environment, also called nature tourism. In Tanzania's Ngorongoro Conservation Area, tourists come to look exclusively at the nature bringing primarily economic benefit with arguably negative impact on sociocultural and environmental factors. As a result, the environmental capacity is exhausted and little attention is paid to the culture and environment. It has created a situation in which the environment is now degraded because of tourism and the economic returns are going to organizations outside of the local economy. Community-based ecotourism helps address this flaw through working more small-scale to not expend more resources than available.

==== Greenwashing ====
Greenwashing is the idea of using the "environmentally friendly" label on low impact conservation efforts. These certifications are often marketing tactics that can actually promote low impact projects in which the costs can be greater than the benefit. This idea is common with certain lodging as people look for green marketing to attempt to have an ecotourism experience with minimal responsibilities as a tourist. Cox offers that small-scale, privatized ecotourism enterprises, such as community ecotourism, can avoid such downfalls of green washing. With community ecotourism, the host community has a greater involvement in trying to protect their environment to eliminate any harmful behavior to the environment. However, these low impact campaigns can cause harm to already vulnerable communities, amplifying the institutionalized poverty found in many of these locations. Effective community ecotourism must allow the community to define their environmental needs.

==== Economic downfalls ====
The challenge of community ecotourism is that it is balancing market objectives with both social and environmental aims, whereas competitors that offer more luxuries have primarily financial objectives. In order to lead community ecotourism to success, there must be a clear sense of leadership and direction for the long-term impact of this organization in the local community. When looking at what makes a successful responsible tourism enterprise, research has found the focus on strong leadership, clear market orientation, and organizational culture to be essential. In community ecotourism, this requires appointing a leader or board that can focus on meeting the triple bottom line. Community ecotourism can redefine the tourism industry as sustainable travel continues to have high consumer demand and thwart the harms associated with mass tourism.

=== Case studies ===
==== Cambodia ====
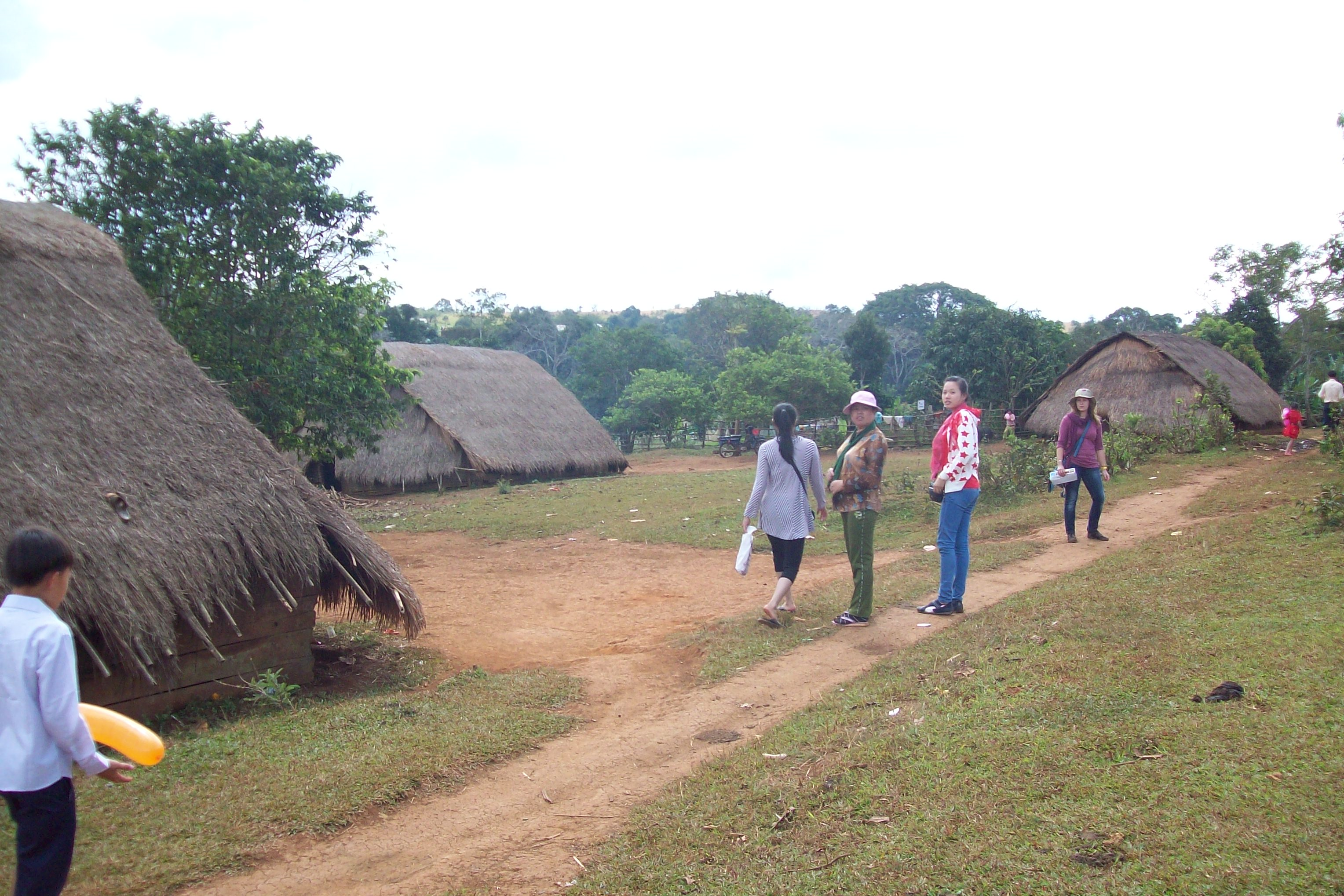
Tourists in Mondulkiri province

One example in particular is southwestern Cambodia, which successfully runs community-based ecotourism to address such issues. First, this program targets villages of low GDP for ecotourism to help provide jobs and education for these communities. The local people in the villages determine the tourism activities available with an emphasis on showing their local culture. In fact, Reimer and Walter have found that in Cambodia, populations have limited their logging and other harmful practices because ecotourism has given a more successful industry and greater awareness to the intrinsic value of the environment. By placing ecotourism in the hands of the local, the least amount of harm is assessed. However, it may limit financial trajectory because of mismanagement or lack of attraction. These concerns with ecotourism can be mitigated through education and careful implementation.

==== Costa Rica ====
Costa Rica is known for its biodiversity with having 5% of the world's biodiversity on its 0.035% of earth's surface. In 2007, the government announced that it would support four types of tourism, ecotourism, adventure tourism, beach tourism, and rural community based tourism. A specific part of Costa Rica that has benefited from community-based ecotourism is Tortuguero, a turtle-nesting area surrounded by a national park with an impoverished community. Nearly the entire population of Tortuguero is working in the tourism industry, as community-based ecotourism is breeding entrepreneurs. Economically, the largest issue of Tortuguero is to maintain the community-based aspect of the tourism as they continue to resist institutionalization from the outside. Environmentally, conservation has been seen as a priority in order to motivate the ecotourism industry. However, because Tortuguero is only accessible by boat, there has been an increase in noise and pollution. Additionally, beach paths had to be inputted to avoid disturbing nesting turtles. In terms of the sociocultural aspect, training and education of the local community has become a priority to ensure their ability to continue as a community-based endeavor. The community has learned to become more organized and work together to build conservation efforts to support their community. There are now nonprofit organizations in Costa Rica that will train local small businesses to successfully run community ecotourism enterprises.

==== Kenya ====
In the 2010s, Kenya's Masai Mara National Park faced an uncertain future. An estimated 70% of tours operated illegally in the park and in 2012, a research paper stated that in 2010 Maasai landowners received just 5% of any revenue from tourism on their lands resulting in a reliance on grazing cattle, charcoal burning and wheat farming on the fringes of the park.

To compound the problem, privatisation of land in Kenya has meant fencing around the Masai Mara National Park has increased by 170% since 2010, reducing the possible range of the park’s large mammals.

In the Mara Naboisho Conservancy (established in 2010), over 500 Maasai landowners lease their land to tourism companies, receiving payment for keeping it unfenced. Lease fees fund education and training facilities and Maasai work as guides, in the camps, and sell beadwork and other crafts. The lease fees mean that individuals not directly involved with tourists also feel the benefits of tourism on their land.

Crucially, the Maasai are landlords and tourism businesses are tenants. This means they are the decision makers and can dictate the volume of tourists who visit, and how tourism operates in the conservancy.

The conservancy model has worked. 65% of Kenya’s wildlife now sits outside its national parks, with higher densities of wildlife found in the conservancies than in the parks. The Mara Naboisho Conservancy has one of the highest densities of lions in the world, with tourism provider Basecamp Kenya employing 400 staff and directly benefitting more than 10,000 families. The conservancy now protects a vital migration corridor between the Masai Mara and the Loita Plains used by several hundred thousand animals.

=== Future Implications ===
Community ecotourism becomes an issue of social justice. The communities that are becoming popular tourist sites are impoverished and are using ecotourism as a tool for economic development. These communities, especially when looking at indigenous tourism, are often lacking voices in the greater political sphere and faced with limited resources. On top of that, they tend to be especially vulnerable to climate change. This brings greater attention to the need of conservation efforts. Through success of community ecotourism, the community can have a larger voice as they show successful development and become a greater participating member in the global sphere.

As the tourism industry continues to grow, it is imperative to continue developing more sustainable avenues to participate in such endeavors. One way is making travelers aware of the potential harm their activities may have on the host culture. A continuing theme is the importance of dialogue and defining the ideals for each party. While stakeholders want the same idea of economic improvement, environmental sustainability, and cross-cultural relationships, the end goals are often defined differently. Opening a reflexive dialogue that is understandable to all is essential. Overall, the success of smaller enterprises that have thrived under strong leadership and community efforts will help tourism be a tool for economic development. Community ecotourism also opens the discussion for the purpose of land usage and the difference of preservation now over usage in the future. Community ecotourism highlights the importance of seeing the community's usage of the land. It can bring a common goal for science and local populations alike. Community ecotourism offers an opportunity for the tourism industry to succeed in conservation efforts while enhancing tourism efforts through a grassroots network effort.

== See also ==
- Agritourism
- Community-based tourism in Myanmar
