= Nick Reding (actor) =

English actor (born 1962)

- Born: Nicholas Mark Reding; 31 August 1962 (age 63); Chiswick, London
- Occupations: actor, director, producer
- Years active: 1981–present
- Website: www.safekenya.org

Nicholas Mark Reding (born 31 August 1962 in Chiswick, London) is an English actor and director. Leaving school at 16, he became a professional actor aged 17. He is probably best known for playing PC Pete Ramsey in The Bill and DI Michael Connor in the BBC crime thriller series Silent Witness.

His many other TV and film appearances include The Monocled Mutineer, Bodyguards, Oscar, Peak Practice, Frank Stubbs Promotes, Minder, Tales from the Crypt, Bugs, Sword of Honour, A Touch of Frost, Paradise Postponed, Murder in Mind, Boon, The Ruth Rendell Mysteries, Captive, Mister Johnson, The House of Eliott, Police 2020, Sunburn, Croupier, Judge John Deed, On stage he played Joseph Porter Pitt in Tony Kushner's Angels in America at the Royal National Theatre, as well as leading roles at the Royal Court. He also appeared in Lovejoy.

Since moving to Kenya in 2002 to launch a charity, he continues to act, appearing in the films The Constant Gardener, Blood Diamond, "The First Grader", Soul Boy and most recently "Vuta N'Kuvute". While still occasionally acting, Reding currently mostly works as a director/producer.

== Charity work ==
Reding is the founder of www.safekenya.org a Kenyan NGO and UK charity that uses street theatre and community programmes to educate, inspire and deliver social change, across Kenya. S.A.F.E. creates arts projects and follow up programmes that help artists and activists educate, entertain and challenge their communities about vital issues such as HIV, FGM/C abandonment, reproductive health, radicalisation, clean water, and environmental protection. S.A.F.E. has run four theatre companies/programmes in Kenya, Safe Pwani based in Mombasa, Safe Ghetto in the Nairobi informal settlements, Safe Maa with the Maasai in the Loita Hills, and Safe Samburu in Kenya's northern frontier district. The film Reding directed, Huruma, was recreated in Kibera slum as a stage performance in Fernando Meirelles's 2005 film The Constant Gardener.

In 2007 Reding was given an award by Keep a Child Alive alongside Bono and Dr Pasquine Obasanyo for outstanding humanitarian work at the Black Ball in New York City. Reding stepped aside after 20 years at the helm in 2022 and currently lives in Nairobi, Kenya.

As a Director Reding has directed three award winning feature films for S.A.F.E : 'Ndoto Za Elibidi', 'Ni Sisi' and 'Watatu' (all available on Netflix) and has recently completed work on 'Sarah', made in partnership with the SAFE Maa team in the Loita Hills. He also co-directed a documentary on Kenyan identity with Wanuri Kahiu, and has made three short fiction films.
