= Frank Stubbs Promotes =

British comedy television programme

- Genre: Comedy drama
- Created by: Simon Nye
- Starring: Timothy Spall; Lesley Sharp; Danniella Westbrook; Choy-Ling Man; Anne Jameson; Nick Reding; Trevor Cooper; Roy Marsden
- Country of origin: United Kingdom
- Original language: English
- No. of series: 2
- No. of episodes: 13

Production
- Running time: 58 minutes (including commercials)
- Production companies: Noel Gay Television; Carlton Television

Original release
- Network: ITV
- Release: 12 July 1993 – 15 August 1994

Frank Stubbs Promotes (alternative title: Frank Stubbs) is a British comedy drama series by Simon Nye, that starred Timothy Spall, Lesley Sharp, Danniella Westbrook, Choy-Ling Man, Anne Jameson, Nick Reding, Trevor Cooper and Roy Marsden. Two series were produced and developed by Noel Gay Television and Carlton Television and was broadcast on ITV between 12 July 1993 and 15 August 1994. The series was adapted from Nye's earlier novel 'Wideboy' which was published by Penguin Books in 1991. The series focusses on the misadventures of Frank Stubbs, a down-at-heel ticket tout turned promoter, whose elaborate business ideas often lead to mediocre results and cause disappointment for himself and his unfortunate clients.

The series one theme song was “Business” and series two, "On My Way Up", both written and performed by Brian May.

== Plot summary ==
Frank Stubbs (Spall) is a downtrodden ticket tout who tires of his job, and leaves his sleazy boss Dave Giddings (Reding) early on in the series, and establishes his own business as a promoter. He often has grandiose ideas to improve his business opportunities and ultimately become a promoter for a higher range of clientele, which often lead to disappointment, regret and frustration due to his poorly organised publicity campaigns. As journalist Thomas Sutcliffe described him in a contemporary review from the time "Frank Stubbs is one of life's losers but that doesn't stop him dreaming of getting off the pavements (where he used to tout tickets) and into a nice little office (from which he can run a virtually illusory promotions business)." As Stubbs tries to run his business singlehandedly, he has to try and cope with his put upon and shrewish sister Petra Dillon (Sharp) along with the rest of his family. Frank often deals with aspiring newcomers seeking fame and washed up luminaries looking to make a comeback, but his efforts often leads to organising crass, cheap and poor executed publicity stunts that often lead to misfortune and failure

== Cast ==
- Timothy Spall as Frank Stubbs
- Lesley Sharp as Petra Dillon
- Danniella Westbrook as Dawn Dillion
- Choy Ling-Man as Karen Lai (Series 1)
- Anne Jameson as Grace Stubbs
- Nick Reding as Dave Giddings (Series 1)
- Trevor Cooper as Archie Nash (Series 1)
- Roy Marsden as Blick (Series 2)

== Episodes ==
=== Series overview ===
Series	Episodes	Originally released	
Series	Episodes	First released	Last released
1	7	12 July 1993	23 August 1993
2	6	11 July 1994	15 August 1994

=== Series 1 (1993) ===
No. overall	No. in series	Title	Original release date
1	1	"Beginners"	12 July 1993
2	2	"Wheels"	19 July 1993
3	3	"Paint"	26 July 1993
4	4	"Starlet"	2 August 1993
5	5	"Skaters"	9 August 1993
6	6	"Striker"	16 August 1993
7	7	"Book"	23 August 1993

=== Series 2 (1994) ===
No. overall	No. in series	Title	Original release date
8	1	"Charity"	11 July 1994
9	2	"Politician"	18 July 1994
10	3	"Babies"	25 July 1994
11	4	"Faith"	1 August 1994
12	5	"Mr Chairman"	8 August 1994
13	6	"Chinatown"	15 August 1994

== Background ==
Nye wrote the first two episodes for the televised series, other writers included the likes of Steve Coombes, Alan Plater, Dave Robinson, Heidi Thomas and Alan Whiting. The series was effectively a starring vehicle for Spall, produced in the vein of similar shows at the time like Minder and Lovejoy for example, whose principal characters seek to exploit and take advantage of others through unscrupulous business schemes in the pursuit for prosperity in their trade. It was commissioned by Carlton Television, during a time when the company was investing and promoting heavily in improving its comedy output with shows such 'Carlton Comedy Playhouse' and 'Head Over Heels', as a means of trying to boost ITV's reputation in comedy production and seriously challenge the BBC's dominance in this field. At the time, the series was produced as a part of a major £58 million drive by ITV to improve its output across its network. Following the first series, a second series consisting of six episodes was commissioned, along with a name change to its title, which was shortened to Frank Stubbs. Unfortunately, the series struggled to gain traction with viewers and regularly attracted viewing figures of less than eight million viewers on average. Made at a time when ITV was obsessed with promoting ratings grabbing prime time shows like A Touch of Frost, Peak Practice and Inspector Morse, the show was quietly cancelled after the second series had concluded in August 1994.

== Home media ==
The series has seldom been repeated on television since it was first broadcast. A few episodes from the first series were released on VHS by Carlton Home Video in 1993, however the entire series has never been officially released on DVD.
