= Police 2020 =

- Poster
- Genre: Crime drama Science fiction
- Created by: Paul Abbott
- Directed by: David Richards
- Starring: Liam Cunningham; Rachel Davies; Nick Reding; Saira Todd; Keith Barron
- Composer: Hal Lindes
- Country of origin: United Kingdom
- Original language: English
- No. of episodes: 1

Production
- Producer: Joanna Gueritz
- Editor: Neil Parker
- Camera setup: Andrew McDonnell
- Running time: 100 minutes
- Production company: Granada Television

Original release
- Network: ITV
- Release: 22 June 1997

Police 2020 is a one-off television pilot, first broadcast on 22 June 1997, that was set to be the first episode of an ongoing British crime drama series. Set in the near future, the pilot starred Liam Cunningham as DCI Billy O'Connell, the head of a police nightshift force, who is tasked with tackling an armed suspect, Eddie Longshaw (Keith Barron), who takes a group of Russian immigrants hostage in an elevator after blaming the immigrant population for an outbreak of tuberculosis that took the lives of most of his family.

However, whilst conducting his investigation, O'Connell and a close colleague, Marsha Beagley (Rachel Davies), are both in the process of competing for a promotion, and are being monitored throughout the crisis to see who performs better, unaware that their superiors are taking advantage of the situation to pit them against each other. Although the feature-length pilot gained much press attention, a full series was not commissioned.

== Cast ==
- Liam Cunningham as DCI Billy O'Connell
- Rachel Davies as DCI Marsha Beagley
- Tim Dantay as DI Brian Sagar
- Maureen Hibbert as DI Christine Baker
- Nick Reding as DS Keanan
- Ken Bradshaw as DS Dewhurst
- Jane Slavin as DC Fiona Muir
- Stephen Hackett as DC Steven Springfield
- Saira Todd as Katline Voikevich
- Keith Barron as Eddie Longshaw
- Ken Bones as Commander Johnson
- Esther Hall as Julie Ostrovsky
- Velibor Topic as Mikki Ostrovsky
- Andrew Knott as Scully
- Rad Lazar as Uri Pacovsky
- Ivan Marevich as Andreyev
- David Prosho as Dr. Fortnum
