= Jack Flea's Birthday Celebration =

- Second City Firsts episode
- Episode no.: Series 6 Episode 4
- Directed by: Mike Newell
- Written by: Ian McEwan
- Original air date: 10 April 1975

"Jack Flea's Birthday Celebration" is the fourth episode of the sixth series of the BBC television series Second City Firsts written by Ian McEwan and directed by Mike Newell. The episode was recorded by the BBC at Pebble Mill and broadcast on 10 April 1976. McEwan wrote the play in 1974, just after completing his first book, First Love, Last Rites, a collection of short stories and he regards it as belonging to that collection.

== Plot ==
David lives with Ruth, a woman nearly twice his age. It is his birthday and he invites his parents to dinner to meet Ruth for the first time. After much wine has been drunk, David pretends to read a chapter from his autobiographical novel, in which the 'stifling, sinister attractions' of his mother drive the protagonist, Jack Flea into the arms of Hermione, an older woman who turns David into her fantasy child. When Mrs. Lee grabs the piece of paper from David it is blank. Ruth and David then act up the fantasy of being mother and child; Ruth and Mrs. Lee vying for possession of David. But is this just drunken fantasy?

== Cast ==
- Sara Kestelman as Ruth
- Eileen McCallum as Mrs Lee
- Ivor Roberts as Mr Lee
- David Wilkinson as David Lee

== Reception ==
Peter Buckman in The Listener wrote of the play "tension well beyond breaking point...a half hour I shall not easily forget".

== Inspiration ==
Writing in 1980, Ian McEwan reveals, 'My intention was to take a television cliché - a kind of family reunion, a dinner party - and to transform it by degrees and by logical extension to a point where fantasy had become reality. The self-reflecting fiction at the centre of the play is perhaps one of those conceits that many writers new to the form are tempted to exploit. As it turned out it was not, as I had feared, too literary or undramatic. It simply became a feature of David Lee's illusory sense of control'.
