= Mara Wetland =

Riverine floodplain near Lake Victoria

The Mara Wetland is a riverine floodplain wetland located near Lake Victoria where the Mara River discharges its water into it.

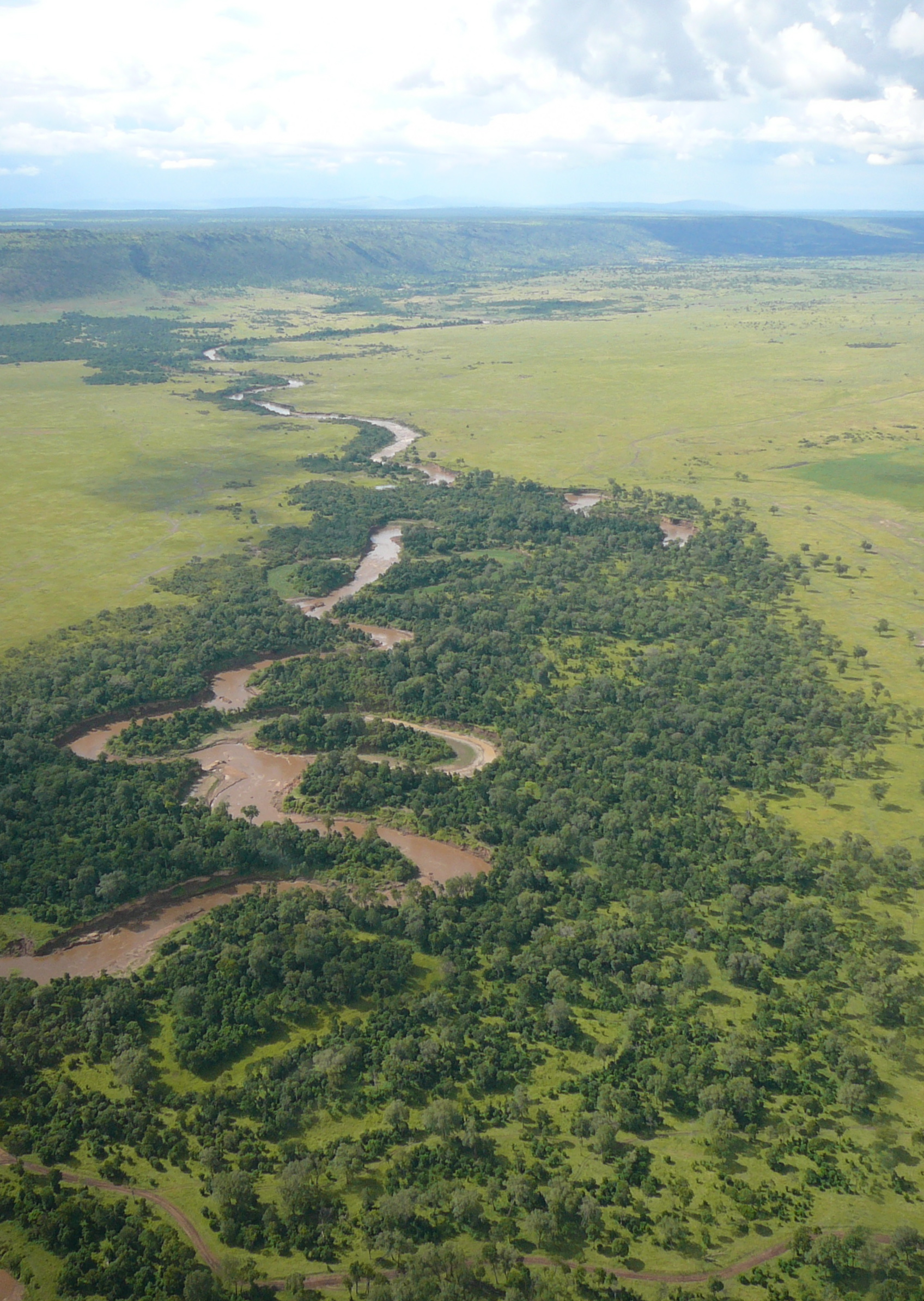
Masai Mara River aerial

The wetland is mainly fed by the Mara River, which has its source in the Kenyan Mau escarpment.

== Main Issues ==
The Mara Wetland, like other wetlands, is an important source of natural resources and habitat for a variety of fauna and flora. A number of plant species are found, the major ones being papyrus (matende/matete) and cattail (mabilimbili). The livelihood of the communities living around the wetland depends on various services provided by the wetland. The main social economic activities of the communities around the Mara Wetland are fishing and papyrus harvesting.

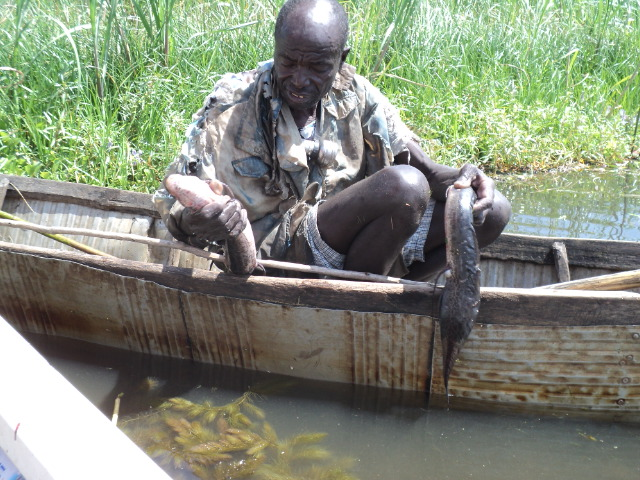
A fisherman holding Kambale/Mumi fish (Clarias sp.) which was taken from the Mara Wetland. Fishing at the Mara Wetland is normally for household food and sale

Over 80% of the population in communities adjacent to the wetland make their daily living from fishing activities. Although papyrus harvesting is among the major economic activities of the community around the Mara Wetland, only 5% of the papyrus is harvested per year. Papyrus is normally used in the production of household commodities such as mats, baskets, placards, ceiling tile, vegetable containers, lamp shades, pads and armchairs.

== The threats ==
The Mara Wetland is continuously degraded despite many efforts to rescue it biodiversity. Change in land use over the past years is the major problem in the Mara River basin. Therefore, protection of the wetland against biodiversity loss is crucial to improve its health.

Between the 1950s and 2006, the seasonal water quantities in the Mara have changed significantly in the sense that there are now higher peaks and lows in the river flow. These dynamics are associated with changes in land use in the catchments area: decreasing vegetation covers are causing a faster run-off of rainwater.

Near the river mouth in Tanzania, the rapidly fluctuating water levels in Lake Victoria of the previous century have further added to discharge difficulties of the Mara River. Consequently, floods have become more common and large parts of the Tanzanian Mara wetlands have become more permanent instead of temporary wetlands. These dynamics have caused a subsequent land cover change from dryland (that occasionally flooded) to wetland forests, to wetland vegetation with varied water-related plants as mentioned above, where eventually the Cyperus papyrus has become one of the most dominant species. These rapid changes have had major effects on the ecology and the livelihoods depending on it. Every stage has different effects on each livelihood activity but in general, cattle farmers have seen their pastures decrease rapidly, fishermen have seen open water bodies increase and later decrease again, and new livelihood activities such as making mats from the papyrus have increased significantly.
