= Anthony O'Donnell (actor) =

Welsh actor

- Born: 1948 (age 77–78); London, England
- Occupation: Actor
- Years active: 1976–present
- Height: 5 ft 4 in (163 cm)

Anthony O'Donnell (born 1948) is an English actor.

== Career ==
In 1982, he was awarded the London Critic's Circle Theatre Award for Most Promising Newcomer in the Stratford Season.

== Filmography ==
Year	Title	Role	Notes
1985	Santa Claus: The Movie	Puffy	
1986	Car Trouble	Frederick	
1988	Hawks	Motel Nightman	
1991	Robin Hood	Emlyn the Bow Maker	
1995	Paparazzo	Terry	
1996	Secrets & Lies	Uneasy Man	
2000	Dragonheart: A New Beginning	Older Mansel	Voice
2001	Love's Labour's Lost	Moth	
2001	A Samba for Sherlock	Watson	
2002	Two Men Went to War	Chief armourer	
2002	Anazapta	Randall	
2004	Vera Drake	Mr. Walsh	
2005	Match Point	Custodian	
2006	Scoop	Pedestrian	Cameo
2007	The Baker	Rhys Edwards	
2007	Death Defying Acts	Oily Librarian	
2008	The Edge of Love	Jack Lloyd	Uncredited
2008	Caught in the Act	Arnold	
2012	Skyfall	Husband at Tube Station	
2020	Dream Horse	Maldwyn	

== Television ==
Year	Title	Role	Notes
1976	Play for Today	Ray	Episode: Nuts in May
1976	The Onedin Line	Seth	Episode: "Shipwreck"
1976	Crown Court	Eric Wilson	Serial: "Those in Peril"
1976	Second City Firsts	Mr. Purvis	Episode: Knock for Knock
1978	The Sweeney	Maurice	Episode: "Trust Red"
1978	In the Forest	Peasant/Banquo	TV film
1981	ITV Playhouse	Vittorio	Episode: "A Ferry Ride Away"
1988	A Very Peculiar Practice	Geoffrey Perks	Episode: "The New Frontier"
1988	The Storyteller	Little Man	Episode: "The Luck Child"
1989	The Paradise Club	Constantinou	Episode: "Revolving Funds"
1991	T-Bag and the Rings Of Olympus	El Mustachio	Episode: "Bandits"
1991	Spatz	Danny Bunce	Episode: "Loot"
1991	Minder	Big Dai	Episode: "The Cruel Canal"
1995	The Tomorrow People	Red Rainwear	Serial: "The Rameses Connection"
1995	The Chief	Barry Maltby	1 episode
1995–1997	The Bill	Southwell/Vic Rimmer	2 episodes
1996	The Fortunes and Misfortunes of Moll Flanders	Catholic Priest	1 episode
1997	Pie in the Sky	Phillip	Episode: "Smelling of Roses"
1997	Noah's Ark	Mick Wilson	2 episodes
1997–1998	Mike and Angelo	Dan Sharkey	2 episodes
1998	Tess of the D'Urbervilles	Crick	TV movie
1999	The Magical Legend of the Leprechauns	Bert Bangell	2 episodes
2002	Animated Tales of the World	Landlord	Episode: "The Crown and the Sceptre: A Story from Arabia"
2003	The Last Detective	Anthony	Episode: "Moonlight"
2004	Agatha Christie: A Life in Pictures	Kenward / Hercule Poirot	TV movie
2005	Twenty Thousand Streets Under the Sky	Mr. Sounder	Miniseries
2005	ShakespeaRe-Told	Mr. Betry	Episode: Much Ado About Nothing
2006	Hotel Babylon	Mr. Thurrock	1 episode
2008	Gavin & Stacey	Ted	Episode: "Birthday Party"
2008	The Sarah Jane Adventures	Commander Kaagh	2 serials, including The Last Sontaran
2009	Robin Hood	Sheriff of York	Episode: "The Enemy of My Enemy"
2011	New Tricks	Roger Bowman	Episode: "Object of Desire"
2011	Doc Martin	Mike Chubb	Episode: "Preserve the Romance"
2012	Being Human	Emrys	Episode: "Puppy Love"
2012	Holby City	Owen Brodick	Episode: "Got No Strings"
2012–2015	Stella	Dai Davies	
2018	Doctors	Cliff Wyn-Jones	Episode: "Our Time"
2018	A Very English Scandal	Leo Abse	1 episode
2019	The Crown	Mayor of Merthyr Tydfil	Episode: "Aberfan"
2023	Bodies	Clive Jones	2 episodes

== Video Games ==
Year	Title	Role	Notes
2025	Final Fantasy Tactics: The Ivalice Chronicles	Elder Simon Penn-Lachish	English Dub
