= Rachel Davies =

English actress

Rachel Davies is an English actress. Her credits include The Cuckoo Waltz (1975), Coronation Street (1975–1976), The Sweeney (1978), All Creatures Great and Small (1978), Doctor Who (1980), The Professionals (1980), Tales Of The Unexpected (1980), Minder (1980), Grange Hill (1983–1984), Juliet Bravo (1980 & 1983) Boon (1986), C.A.T.S. Eyes (1987), Making Out (1989–1991), Brookside (1991), ScreenPlay (nr.87): A Little Bit of Lippy (1992), Emmerdale (1993–1994), Cracker (1994), Band of Gold (1995–1996), Hillsborough (1996), Dangerfield (1997), Nice Guy Eddie (2001), Linda Green (2001–2002), Bodies (2004), The Chase (2006–2007), Waterloo Road (2011), Doctors (2004–2013), and Peterloo (2018).

== Career ==
Born in Manchester, Lancashire, she has played leading roles in the following series: Boon (1986), The Cuckoo Waltz (1975), Making Out (1989–1991), Band of Gold (1995–1996), Telltale (1993), she played Shirly Foster/Turner for 75 episodes of Emmerdale (1993–1994), Nice Guy Eddie (2001), Linda Green (2001–2002), and The Chase (2006–2007). She appeared in the acclaimed single drama Hillsborough (1996). In 2000 she played Estelle in the last film that had John Thaw in the lead role, Buried Treasure (2001).

Guest roles on TV include: Z-Cars (1978), Coronation Street (1975–1976), The Sweeney (1978), All Creatures Great and Small (1978), Last of the Summer Wine (1987), alongside Tom Baker in Doctor Who in the serial State of Decay (1980), The Professionals (1980), Tales Of The Unexpected (1980), Grange Hill (1983–1984), Juliet Bravo (1980 & 1983), Minder (1980), C.A.T.S. Eyes (1987), Brookside (1991), Cracker (1994), Midsomer Murders (2007), Dangerfield (1997), Casualty (1997 & 2007), The Bill, Holby City, Heartbeat (1993 & 2004), Bodies (2004), Doctors (2004–2013) and Waterloo Road (2011).

Davies starred in the 1984 British comedy A Private Function as Mr Wormold's landlady, Mrs Forbes.

== Filmography ==
Year	Title	Role	Notes
1971	The Troubleshooters	Ann Dowling	Episode: "Monopoly with Real Money"
1973	Harriet's Back in Town	Buzz	
1974	Seven Faces of Woman	Christine	Episode: "A Woman's Estate"
1975	Thriller	Nancy	Episode: "The Next Voice You See"
1975	The Wild West Show	Jean	Episode: "Oh! Oh! Antonio"
1975	Within These Walls	Anne Litton	Episode: "Windows"
1975	Play for Today	Outpatients Sister	Episode: "Through the Night"
1975	The Cuckoo Waltz	Carol Rumsey	Episodes: "Paying Your Way" and "House for Sale"
1975–1976	Coronation Street	Donna Parker	
1975	Second City Firsts	Yvonne	Episode: "The Permissive Society"
1976	The Onedin Line	Mary Baines	Episode: "Month of the Albatross"
1976	Second City Firsts	Michelle Grant	Episode: "Summer Season"
1977	The XYY Man	Sheila Watts	Episode: "Whisper Who Dares"
1977	The Rag Trade	June Burleigh	Episode: "The New Girl"
1978	All Creatures Great and Small	Mary Metcalfe	Episode: "Bulldog Breed"
1978	Parables	Tina Fuller	Episode: "Britannia Mansions"
1978	Z-Cars	WDC Howett	Episodes: "First Offender" and "Deserter"
1978	The Sweeney	Tina Adams	Episode: "One of Your Own"
1979	Yanks	Girl in Club	
1979	The Dick Francis Thriller: The Racing Game	Doria Graves	Episode: "Odds Against"
1979	Crown Court	Diana Graham	Episode: "A Friend of the Family"
1980	Tales Of The Unexpected	Diane	Episode: "The Man at the Top"
1980	Hammer House of Horror	Emma	Episode: "The House That Bled to Death"
1980	Minder	Bettina	Episode: "A Nice Little Wine"
1980	The Professionals	Deborah	Episode: "Hijack"
1980	Doctor Who	Camilla	4 episodes: "State of Decay"
1980	Strangers	Jean Rutter	Episodes: "Armed and Dangerous" and "A Racing Certainty"
1980	Juliet Bravo	Judy Grainger	Episode: "Coming Back"
1981	Crown Court	Martine Rose	Episode: "Foul Play"
1981	The House on the Hill	Jean	Episode: "Something for the Boys"
1982	Five-Minute Films	The Hostess	Episode: "Afternoon"
1982	Strangers	Sgt. Jill Tender	Episode: "The Tender Trap"
1983	The Last Song	Girl	Episodes: 2.4 2.5
1983	Juliet Bravo	Pat Walsh	Episode: "Guilt"
1983–1984	Grange Hill	Mrs. Jones	Episodes: "On Trial", "Love Triangle", and "Episode Six"
1984	Leaving	Jan	Episodes: 1.2, 1.5, and 1.6
1984	A Private Function	Mrs Forbes	
1985	Crossroads: Kings Oak	Elaine Winters	
1986	Boon	Doreen Evans	
1986	Knights & Emeralds	Mrs. Fontain	
1987	C.A.T.S. Eyes	Gloria McCrewer	Episode: "The Big Burn"
1987	Last of the Summer Wine	Mavis	Episode: "Big Day at Dream Acres"
1989–1991	Making Out	Pauline	Series regular
1990	The Manageress	Blane Hennessey	Episodes: "Steal Your Heart Away", "A Hundred and Ten Percent", and "A Match for Anyone"
1992	ScreenPlay: A Little Bit of Lippy	Alma Titherington	ScreenPlay Episode Nr. 87
1993	Heartbeat	Nell Robinson	Episode: "Manhunt"
1993	Telltale	Doreen Hodge	
1994	Cracker	Mrs Malcolm	Episode: "Men Should Weep"
1993–1994	Emmerdale	Shirley Turner	
1995–1996	Band of Gold	Joyce Webster	Series 1–2
1996	Hillsborough	Teresa Glover	
1997	Dangerfield	Barbara Taylor	Episode: "Happy Families"
1997	Born to Run	Elayne Quigley	Episodes: 1.1, 1.2, 1.6
1997	Hetty Wainthropp Investigates	Myra	Episode: "Woman of the Year"
1997	Police 2020	DCI Marsha Beagley	
1997	Casualty	Maureen	Episode: "Love's Labour"
1998	Silent Witness	Eileen Bennett	Episode: "Fallen Idol"
1999	Butterfly Collectors	Rachel Garratt	
1999	The Bill	Lisa Upton	Episode: "True Lies"
2001	Nice Guy Eddie	Veronica 'Ronnie' McMullen	
2001	Hidden Treasure / Buried Treasure	Estelle	Television film featuring John Thaw
2001–2002	Linda Green	Iris Green	
2003	Holby City	Martha Palmer	Episode: "A Friend in Need"
2004	Heartbeat	Jean Godwin	Episode: "In the Bleak Midwinter"
2004	Bodies	Angela Strawberry	Episodes: 1.1, 1.3, 1.6
2004	Doctors	Eileen Rees	Episode: "Passing By"
2004	Fat Friends	Mrs. Chadwick	Episodes: "Leggs Over Easy", "Food of Love"
2004	Best Friends	Biscuits' Gran	
2005	Cutting It	Elayne Quigley	
2006	Dalziel and Pascoe	Sandra McNally	Episode: "Fallen Angel"
2006–2007	The Chase	Margaret Wright	
2007	Casualty	Maureen Bunce	Episode: "Meltdown"
2007	Midsomer Murders	Jeannie Harding	Episode: "The Axeman Cometh"
2009	Doctors	Marion Cosgrove	Episode: "Turkish Delight"
2009	The Bill	Eileen Walmsley	Episode: "Down South"
2011	Waterloo Road	Granny	Episode: 7.6
2011	Doctors	Maureen O'Dowd	Episode: "Relax and Rejuvenate"
2012	Branded	The Cow	
2013	Doctors	Violet Connan	Episode: "The Hider in the House"
2017	Holby City	Bedelia Oosterhause	Episode: "Things Left Unsaid"
2018	Peterloo	Pie buyer	
