= The Permissive Society =

- Second City Firsts episode
- Episode no.: Series 4 Episode 4
- Directed by: Mike Leigh
- Original air date: April 10, 1975
- Running time: 29 minutes

"The Permissive Society" is the fourth episode of the fourth season of the BBC television series Second City Firsts starring Bob Mason, Veronica Roberts, and Rachel Davies. The episode was directed by Mike Leigh and aired on 10 April 1975. "The Permissive Society" is set in Birmingham and concerns a young couple (Les and Carol) facing difficulties with their relationship and sexual needs, whilst Les's sister Yvonne prepares for a date of her own.

== Plot ==
Before his date with Carol, Les brings her to his family's flat. His sister Yvonne arrives soon after, and the three engage in small talk, wherein Yvonne reveals that her husband left her and she has decided to try dating again. Les eventually rushes Yvonne off then he and Carol resume their awkward conversation, which nearly ends due to her impatience with him. She asks if he has treated previous girlfriends in such a manner, and he admits to her being his first. He has also never had sex, which explains his never making a pass at Carol. His stepfather's misinformation of sex has caused Les to remain a virgin.

Les apologises for his behaviour, as Carol looks around the flat, spying his ukulele. She asks him to play for her, and he sings "Leaning on a Lamp-post". She kisses him. Yvonne returns, after her date was a no-show. Les invites her to go out with them, but she declines. He and Carol leave her alone in the flat.

== Cast ==
- Bob Mason as Les
- Veronica Roberts as Carol, Les's girlfriend
- Rachel Davies as Yvonne, Les's sister
