= Band of Gold (TV series) =

British television crime drama series aired on ITV from 1995 to 1997

- Also known as: Gold
- Genre: Crime drama
- Created by: Kay Mellor
- Written by: Kay Mellor; Mark Davies-Markham; Catherine Johnson
- Starring: Geraldine James; Cathy Tyson; Barbara Dickson; Samantha Morton; Tony Doyle; David Schofield; Rachel Davies; Richard Moore; Ray Stevenson; Fiona Allen
- Ending theme: "Love Hurts" — Barbara Dickson (Series 1)
- Composer: Hal Lindes
- Country of origin: United Kingdom
- Original language: English
- No. of series: 3
- No. of episodes: 18

Production
- Executive producers: Sally Head; Gub Neal
- Producers: Tony Dennis; Elizabeth Bradley; Gillian McNeill
- Production locations: Bradford, West Yorkshire
- Cinematography: Peter Jessop
- Editors: Anthony Ham; Tony Cranstoun
- Running time: 50 minutes
- Production company: Granada Television

Original release
- Network: ITV
- Release: 12 March 1995 – 1 December 1997

Band of Gold is a British television crime drama series, written and created by Kay Mellor, first broadcast on ITV on 12 March 1995. It was produced by Granada Television and revolves around the lives of prostitutes working in Bradford's red-light district. Principal actresses include Geraldine James, Cathy Tyson, Barbara Dickson, and Samantha Morton. Three series of Band of Gold were produced (the third under the moniker of Gold, with only a small number of characters from the first two series), with the final episode broadcast on 1 December 1997.

Each series was released on VHS after its broadcast, followed by DVD reissues under the Cinema Club brand in July 2004. The complete series was released on DVD by Network in 2006, and reissued in 2009. Prolific tie-in specialist John Burke novelised the first series' teleplays in Band of Gold: Ring of Lies (15 February 1996) and the second in Band of Gold: Chain of Power (9 May 1996); the publisher was Headline Books. A behind-the-scenes book, Gold: The Making of Band of Gold, written by Anthony Hayward, was published on 2 September 1997, to tie in with the broadcast of the final series.

== Synopsis ==
=== Series 1 ===
Gina Dickson (Ruth Gemmell) is a young mother living in Bradford, West Yorkshire who has thrown out her abusive husband, Steve, and finds herself in debt. She can't find work, there's no one to look after her three young daughters, and a loan shark Mr. Moore wants his money back. She meets Carol (Cathy Tyson) since their children go to the same school. Carol, who works as a prostitute, teaches Gina how to "work the Lane" and introduces her to the world of ponces, punters, and police. Gina also meets Carol's friends: Rose (Geraldine James), an older hooker who rules the lane, and Tracy (Samantha Morton), a 15-year-old runaway who's hooked on drugs supplied by her pimp. Anita Braithwaite (Barbara Dickson) is another friend who allows the women to rent rooms in her flat in exchange for a cut of their earnings.

In the first episode, Carol accompanies Gina to a client's house and steals money from him. Gina then puts her safety on the line by working "The Lane" alone and is found murdered by a serial killer, who proceeds to murder other prostitutes in Bradford. During the first series, Carol becomes intrigued and wary of a middle-aged client, named Curly (Richard Moore), who has a stocking fetish. Anita struggles to get by and her benefactor George Ferguson controls her. Tracy is attacked and nearly killed by her pimp Dez (Ashan Bhatti), but she recovers and her parents take her home. She is unable to stand living under their rules. Tracy's father abused her, she is not sure that her mother believes her, and her sister is resentful towards her for leaving home because her parents argued a lot since Tracy left. As a result, Tracy runs away from home again.

Tracy and Rose travel to London where Tracy continues her street-walking profession and Rose tries to go straight by going to college and meets a man, Richard, for whom she starts to have feelings. When Richard rejects her she quits college and returns to Bradford without Tracy.

The officer in charge of the murder investigation, DCI Newall, is revealed to be having a tryst with Carol, who allows herself to be taken advantage of in order to avoid being arrested for prostitution. She suffers an emotional breakdown after pouring a kettle of hot water on Curly, and, after a period in a psychiatric hospital, she off to try to find Gina's killer, encountering many red herrings.

In the final episode of the first series, Carol comes face-to-face with the killer in a deserted community centre: he is revealed to be the man whom Carol and Gina briefly met in the first episode. He was the same client from whom Carol stole money. Fortunately the other women, led by Curly, break into the building and the killer is subdued before he can kill Carol by drowning her in a swimming pool.

The first series ends on a somewhat upbeat note when Carol and Rose quit prostitution and set up a cleaning company to rival that of the businessman, George Ferguson, for whom the loan shark, Mr Moore, was revealed to be working and who was responsible for the harassment that led to Gina's death.

=== Series 2 ===
The main story arc of the sequel is based around Tracy as her drug addiction becomes worse and leads to psychosis. Rose and Carol are trying to make a living from their cleaning company, "Scrubbit", with the financial support of Anita. But their old enemy, George Ferguson, is released from jail wanting revenge and needing a way to clear the debts he owes the local gangster Alf Black. Meanwhile, Tracy is still on the game and is in a sexual dalliance with Black who supplies her drugs. He is using her as a pawn in a grander scheme to import drugs into the country. There's also a new prostitute on the streets, the emotionally damaged and dangerous S&M specialist Colette (Lena Headey).

Tracy is now living with Rose and using the house as a brothel much to Rose's dismay. Tracy has befriended Colette, who Rose dislikes. George Ferguson tries to seek revenge on the women since he owns part of Scrubbit as his estranged wife Kathleen backed the company for the woman so they could set it up, as Anita went and told Kathleen she had been having an affair with her husband George for years. Anita lies and tells George that the women are interested in having him involved they set up a meeting where he admits on tape that he still has financial wealth. Anita blackmails him and tells him to stay away or she will take the tape to the police.

The woman's celebrations are short lived when George runs Anita over with his car and snatches the tape from Anita's handbag. Earlier, Anita lets on about Colette's punter giving them advice about Scrubbit and George's intentions with the company. During this episode Tracy is introduced to Alf at a party, and they have sex.

Rose is the only member of the team who isn't fed up with running Scrubbit. Carol's old client, Curly (Richard Moore), has become more of a friend. Brenda (Margo Gunn) is a Klenzit employee who helps Ferguson in his attempt to sabotage Scrubbit. She is working for Scrubbit and going behind the women's backs to Ferguson telling him information about Scrubbit. However, Curly is found dead in Carol's house with his throat cut. Rose suspects it was George Ferguson, but he too is later found murdered. Carol worries that the police will accuse her because she had a mental breakdown earlier on in series one and that Curly was one of her punters. She panics and disposes of his body with Rose's help, but police find the car the next day with Carol's fingerprints all over the car. Carol is arrested for Curly's murder.

Meanwhile, there's heartbreak for Rose when she thinks that cellist Sarah is her long-lost daughter. Rose tells Sarah that she thinks she is her daughter. Sarah gets upset and explains that she had a sister, named Hannah, a foster child who ran away when she was 12. Rose goes back to the house to speak to Sarah's mother only to find out Hannah went to a children's home in Sheffield after running away several times and tying Sarah to a chair and cutting all her hair off and stabbing her three times.

Later on, Rose finds out that Colette is her daughter. Sarah's family fostered Colette but she ran away after being violent towards Sarah who tells Rose what Colette did to her when they were children. Rose is shocked by the news.

Carol gets in the clear after the police discover Ferguson was killed in the same way as Curly. Vinnie is still pestering Carol and he kidnaps Emma after she comes back from swimming he rings Carol and tells her he's got Emma. Carol quickly goes to where Vinnie says he's holding Emma. DCI Newell saves Emma and Vinnie is arrested for this and questioned about the death of his uncle, Curly, which he denies killing him.

Meanwhile, Tracy is in deeper trouble with Alf Black. Rose is shocked when she discovers that her daughter is actually Colette. Carol re-evaluates her feelings for DCI Newall, who is now investigating these latest murders. Tracy's ex-pimp, Dez (who almost killed her in Series 1) is released from jail. Tracy enlists Colette's help in order to take her revenge against Dez, but Colette hadn't bargained for Tracy murdering him.

It was Tracy who murdered Curly in Carol's house when he comes round to visit her but Carol is not in as she had taken Emma to the park. Tracy also murders George Ferguson in cold blood while he is coming out of where he works in the car park. Tracy slits his throat and leaves him for dead. Anita hits him over the head with a crutch and knocks him out, she is later brought by the police as a suspect but is later released. Anita later realises that it was Tracy who murdered all three men and she is now a psychotic mass murderer.

Meanwhile, Joyce takes her grandchildren to Blackpool to see Steve who is now working there. They have a pleasant day at the seaside but things are soured when they both have too much to drink and sleep together, they both wake up the next day regretting what they have done as Steve was married to Joyce's dead daughter Gina who was murdered in series 1.

In the final episode, Colette asks for Rose's help to cover up Dez's murder when Tracy refuses to acknowledge what she has done in committing cold-blooded murder. Tracy's psychosis leads her in deeper with her demons when she goes back to Harrogate to her parents house and her father answers the door. Rose rings the house, Tracy answers, and after hearing Rose's voice, she unplugs the phone. Rose borrows a van and the girls go to Harrogate to rescue Tracy, but they get there too late as Tracy had already committed suicide upstairs in her mother and father's house. Tracy had confronted her father and he admitted to his past abuse of her. The scene ends with a grieving Rose cradling Tracy as she lays in her bed, covered in blood from stabbing herself, with Collette and Tracy's father standing in the bedroom doorway behind them.

At the end of series 2, sees the girls sitting at the pub where they were in the beginning of the first series but it's revealed that it's the day of Tracy's funeral and they are saying goodbye to her. Carol sees Curly's solicitor and discovers she has inherited his factory and all his wealth. The scene ends with Rose, Anita, Carol, Joyce, and Colette sadly toasting Tracy's life, and survival, and The Lane.

=== Series 3 ===
Re-titled Gold, the third and final series is regarded as a spin-off or a sequel due to the series being heavily retooled. The series begins as Carol moves from the Ingram Estate to Curly's large house in an upmarket area. Carol is unwisely spending her inheritance money like water on everything now having newfound wealth and she doesn't know what to do with it. She goes to visit Colette in the house where she lived with Tracy, but she doesn't recognise Carol. Colette asks what Carol is doing there she explains that she has come to visit old friends.

Carol's inheritance is threatened when Curly's nephew, Vinnie, has hired a private detective to try to prove that Carol is still on the game as a prostitute. Meanwhile, Rose take on a cause to celebrate when a beautiful escort, named Paula, is implicated in two murders. After DCI Mace is killed, Paula disappears and Rose is asked to assist the police to find her. Rose finally locates Paula and takes her to Carol's house. The only person who can save Paula is murdered. Paula goes back home to her husband where he shoots her and them himself. Rose finds them both dead.

Also, a young transsexual prostitute named Sherrie is raped and Rose and Carol must ensure the victim gets justice by finding her assailant. In the final arc of the series, Rose takes on dangerous gangsters from Leeds and a confused but dangerous young prostitute (Alicya Eyo) as they control the lives of the girls on the lane.

Meanwhile, Carol accuses Vinnie of trying to take over Curly's factory and arranges for him to be dealt with. Rose continues to do good work in the community and on the tolerance zone all the girls are being targeted. Sherrie identifies the attacker as a magistrate that works with Rose. The worker, Ed Smithson, is stalking Sherrie when he breaks into her flat and threatens her with a razor. Sherrie is raped by Ed Smithson and afterwards she tells Rose about it. The police become involved and Sherrie then retracts her statement, when bribed by Ed. Rose accuses Smithson of blackmailing and bribing Sherrie. Rose loses her job and Inspector Henryson rewards Rose by giving her job back and sacking Smithson as the sponsor and hiring someone else.

Carol's half sister, Lisa, turns up at her house because their mother is in hospital. Lisa ends up leaving after her and Carol had an argument and she called Carol a whore. Lisa leaves and is manipulated into working on the lane by Charlie, nicknamed Little Charlie for his false hope of running the lane.

The body of a murdered black woman is found and is identified as Marva. Raymond is questioned by the police. After he is released. he comes after Rose and attacks her with a gun.

In the final episode, Raymond kidnaps Rose, who tells her that Shaun killed Marva. Shaun is then killed and Carol and Rose realise that Charlie is the killer. Vinnie burns down the factory to get back at Carol and collect the insurance money, but he does not know that Carol, Rose, Emma, Lisa, and Charlie are still inside. They all manage to get out, except for Charlie, who perishes in the fire, as the series ends on this dramatic and tragic note.

== Locations ==
"The lane" referred to in the production is a reference to "Lumb Lane" which is a real street in Manningham, Bradford, historically renowned for being an area in which many prostitutes work. In recent years, however, "The Lane" has fallen into disfavour among sex workers due to alleged intimidation by groups of local residents who have formed "clean-up" gangs. Part of the filming took place in the West End area of Ashton-under-Lyne.

== Cast ==
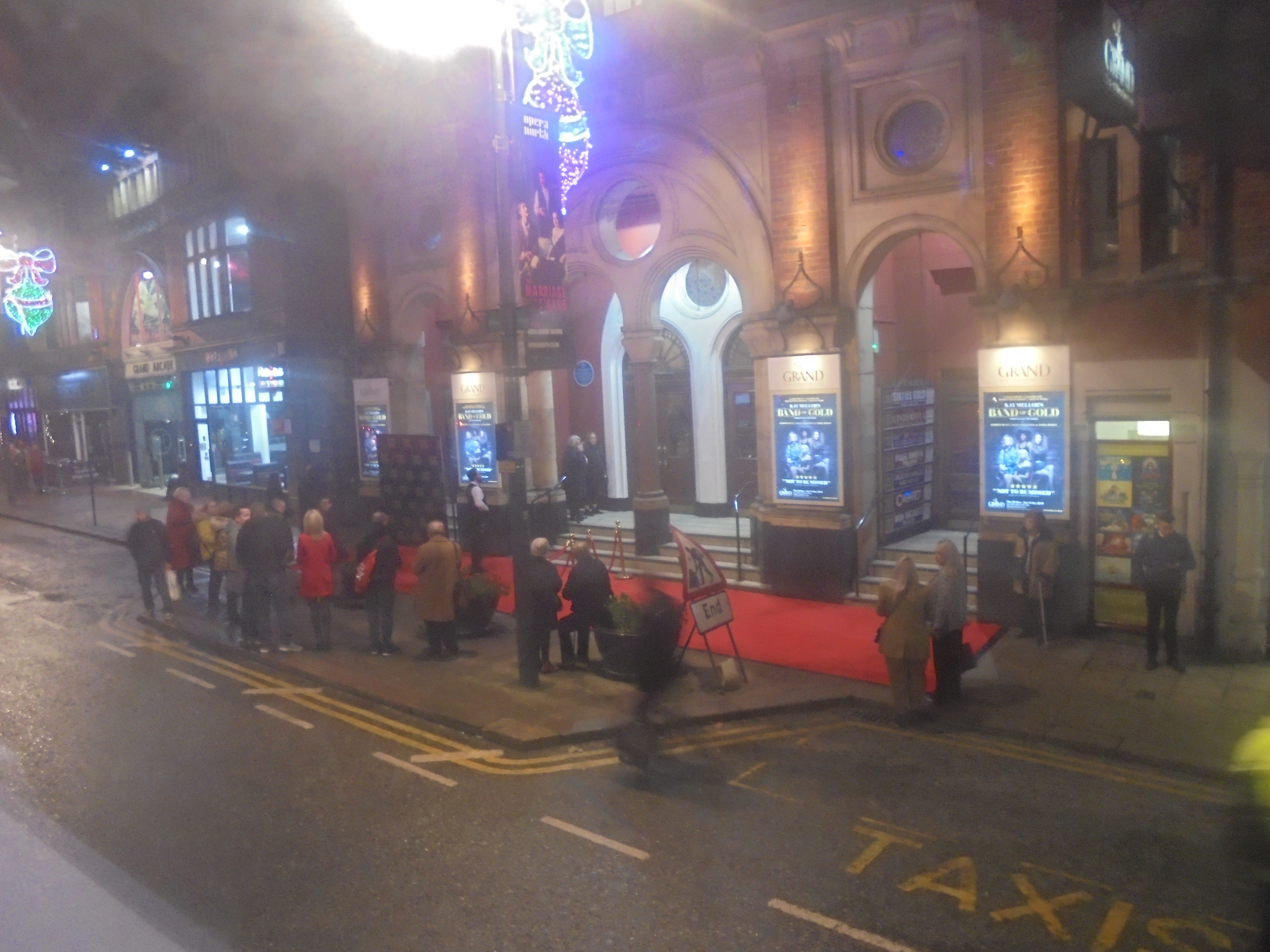
A stage play adaptation has been made; its opening night at the Grand Theatre, Leeds in December 2019 can be seen.

=== Main ===
- Geraldine James as Rosemary "Rose" Garrity (Series 1–3)
- Cathy Tyson as Carol Johnson (Series 1–3)
- Barbara Dickson as Anita Braithwaite (Series 1–2)
- Samantha Morton as Naomi "Tracy" Richards (Series 1–2)
- Tony Doyle as George Ferguson (Series 1–2)
- David Schofield as DCI David Newhall (Series 1–2)
- Rachel Davies as Joyce Webster (Series 1–2)
- Richard Moore as Granville 'Curly' Dirken (Series 1–2)
- Ray Stevenson as Steve Dickson (Series 1–2)
- Fiona Allen as DI Erica Cooper (Series 3)

=== Supporting ===
- Ruth Gemmell as Gina Dixon (Series 1)
- Ace Bhatti as Dez (Series 1–2)
- Lena Headey as Colette (Series 2 - 3)
- Anthony Milner as Bob (Series 1)
- Adam Kotz as Vinnie Marshall (Series 1 & 3)
- Judy Browne as DS Kershaw (Series 1)
- Laura Kilgallon as Emma Johnson (Series 1–3)
- Stephen MacKenna as Ian (Series 1)
- Brian Potter as a pimp (Series 2)
- Darren Tighe as Smiley (Series 2)
- Rebecca Callard as Tula (Series 2)
- Darren Warner as Lloyd (Series 3)
- Judy Brooke as Julie (Series 3)
- Danny Edwards as Sherrie Goodman (Series 3)
- Alicya Eyo as Jae (Series 3)
- Kern Falconer as Insp. Henryson (Series 3)
- Ifan Meredith as Little Charlie (Series 3)

=== Guest appearances ===
The series featured a number of guest appearances from well-established British actors, or actors who went on to high-profile careers. Listed alphabetically, they include: Mark Addy, Fiona Allen, John Bowler, David Bradley, Tony Capstick, Justin Chadwick, Sue Cleaver, David Crellin, Barbara Durkin, David Fleeshman, Ruth Gemmell, Malcolm Hebden, Richard Hope, Susan Jameson, Bruce Jones, Naomi Radcliffe, Jane Slavin, Meera Syal and Nicola Wheeler.

== Episodes ==
=== Series overview ===
Series	Episodes	Originally released	
Series	Episodes	First released	Last released
1	6	12 March 1995	16 April 1995
2	6	3 March 1996	7 April 1996
3	6	27 October 1997	1 December 1997

=== Series 1 (1995) ===
- Producer — Tony Dennis. Executive Producer — Sally Head. Broadcast — Sundays, 9:00pm.

No. overall	No. in series	Title	Directed by	Written by	Original release date
1	1	"Sold"	Richard Standeven	Kay Mellor	12 March 1995
2	2	"Caught"	Richard Standeven	Kay Mellor	19 March 1995
3	3	"Damaged"	Richard Laxton	Kay Mellor	26 March 1995
4	4	"Revenge"	Richard Laxton	Kay Mellor	2 April 1995
5	5	"Told"	Charles Beeson	Kay Mellor	9 April 1995
6	6	"Clean"	Charles Beeson	Kay Mellor	16 April 1995

=== Series 2 (1996) ===
- Producer — Elizabeth Bradley. Broadcast — Sundays, 9:00pm.

No. overall	No. in series	Title	Directed by	Written by	Original release date
7	1	"Hustling"	Betsan Morris Evans	Kay Mellor	3 March 1996
8	2	"Kiss"	Betsan Morris Evans	Kay Mellor	10 March 1996
9	3	"Betrayal"	Betsan Morris Evans	Kay Mellor	17 March 1996
10	4	"Hurt"	Matthew Evans	Kay Mellor	24 March 1996
11	5	"Love"	Matthew Evans	Kay Mellor	31 March 1996
12	6	"Release"	Matthew Evans	Kay Mellor	7 April 1996

=== Series 3: Gold (1997) ===
- Producer — Gillian McNeill. Broadcast — Mondays, 9:00pm.

No. overall	No. in series	Title	Directed by	Written by	Original release date
13	1	"She's Back — Part 1"	Sheree Folkson	Kay Mellor	27 October 1997
14	2	"She's Back — Part 2"	Sheree Folkson	Kay Mellor	3 November 1997
15	3	"The Catch — Part 1"	David Innes-Edwards	Mark Davies-Markham	10 November 1997
16	4	"The Catch — Part 2"	David Innes-Edwards	Mark Davies-Markham	17 November 1997
17	5	"Tainted Love — Part 1"	Rachel Talalay	Catherine Johnson	24 November 1997
18	6	"Tainted Love — Part 2"	Rachel Talalay	Catherine Johnson	1 December 1997
