= Sam Kelly =

British actor (1943–2014)

- Sam Kelly
- Born: Roger Michael Kelly; 19 December 1943; Salford, Lancashire, England
- Died: 14 June 2014 (aged 70); Esher, Surrey, England
- Education: Liverpool Collegiate School; Liverpool Cathedral
- Alma mater: London Academy of Music and Dramatic Art
- Occupation: Actor
- Years active: 1967–2014
- Partner: Grace Pieniazek (died 2009)

Roger Michael Kelly (19 December 1943 – 14 June 2014), known by the stage name Sam Kelly, was an English actor who appeared in film, television, radio, and theatre. He is best known for his roles as Captain Hans Geering in 'Allo 'Allo!, Warren in Porridge, Sam in On the Up, and Ted Liversidge in Barbara.

== Early life ==
Kelly was born in Salford, Lancashire, on 19 December 1943, and was abandoned; he was adopted by a couple who moved to Liverpool. There, he attended the Liverpool Collegiate School and was a chorister at Liverpool Cathedral, where he showed early acting talent by reciting monologues. He worked for three years in the Civil Service in Liverpool before training as an actor at the London Academy of Music and Dramatic Art. After graduating in 1967, he appeared in repertory theatres around the UK.

== Career ==
Stage work took him to the Midlands and north of England and St Andrews, Scotland, with roles ranging from Pompey in Measure for Measure, Truscott in Loot, Touchstone in As You Like It, and Dan Leno in The Funniest man in the world (Stratford East, 1977). At the Sheffield Crucible, he appeared in Charley's Aunt and Absurd Person Singular, then Victoria Wood's Good Fun (1980). For two years, he was in the stage version of The Two Ronnies at the London Palladium and on tour.

His early screen roles included playing a film director in Tiffany Jones (1973) and appearances in two of the later Carry On films, Carry On Dick (1974) and Carry On Behind (1975). He then had a significant role in the British sitcom Porridge as the affable and high-spirited Slade Prison inmate Bunny Warren, who relies on fellow prisoners to read his letters from home and blames his incarceration on his inability to read. In the sitcom 'Allo 'Allo!, he played German officer Captain Hans Geering, leaving after the third series (something he later said he regretted doing). In 1982, he played Don in 'Get Well Soon' (owned now by the BFI), a health and safety film, made at Lewisham Abbey National Building Society. He played the law-stationer Mr. Snagsby in the 1985 BBC adaptation of Bleak House. In On the Up, he played Dennis Waterman's character's chauffeur, and he appeared in We'll Think of Something as Les Brooks. From 1990 to 1992, he co-starred in the comedy television series Haggard. In 1994, he appeared as Mr. Mould, the undertaker, in the BBC mini-series Martin Chuzzlewit. From 1999 to 2003, he played Barbara's husband Ted in the British sitcom Barbara.

In 1996, Kelly appeared at the National Theatre in Helen Edmundson's adaptation of Leo Tolstoy's War and Peace. He played Bernard in Holding On (1997) and Carl Langbehn in the five-part television drama Christabel (1988). He appeared in the Midsomer Murders episode "Down Among the Dead Men" as Jack Fothergill in 2006 and as the eccentric, impoverished ghostwriter, Majors, in the Inspector Morse episode "Second Time Around".

Kelly went on to play Sir Joseph Porter in H.M.S. Pinafore with the new D'Oyly Carte Opera Company in 2002, having taken the role of Monsieur Jourdain "as a kind of Baroque Blackadder" in the 1912 version of Strauss's Ariadne auf Naxos with Scottish Opera at the 1997 Edinburgh Festival. In 1998, Kelly appeared as George Spelvin in a concert version of Strike Up the Band at the Barbican in London and was also seen in an episode of the first series of Cold Feet, playing Algernon Gifford.

On radio, he was a regular participant in Listen with Mother on BBC radio during the 1970s, and played the part of Carter Brandon in the BBC Radio 4 series of the continuing adventures of Uncle Mort and Carter Brandon in Uncle Mort's South Country and Uncle Mort's Celtic Fringe, which were written by Peter Tinniswood.

In 2004, he appeared in the EastEnders one-off episode Pat and Mo playing Stan Porter, and he also appeared in the comedy series Black Books as the father of Manny. In 2006, he appeared as the villain Guy Carse in New Tricks. Also in 2004, he played two characters, Harry Hawkswell and Stan Bickle, in the series 13 episode 22 of Heartbeat, A Call to Arms.

Kelly starred in Jean-Paul Sartre's play Kean alongside Antony Sher at the Theatre Royal, Bath, and in the West End in May 2007. In December 2007, a car struck and injured Kelly in the West End. He was due to have performed in the Doctor Who episode ("Midnight") filmed that month, but the role was taken by David Troughton instead. However, Kelly acted in the Doctor Who audio dramas "The Holy Terror" and "Return to the Web Planet" by Big Finish Productions.

In 2008, he guest-starred in the Sapphire and Steel audio drama Remember Me. In November 2008, he starred in the title role of Christopher Reason's radio dramatisation of Jaroslav Hašek's The Good Soldier Švejk, broadcast on BBC Radio 4.

From May 2009, Kelly starred as the Wizard in the West End production of the musical Wicked, replacing Desmond Barrit. From 27 March 2010 he was succeeded by Clive Carter.

He worked with director Mike Leigh on several occasions, including Knock for Knock (1976), Grown-Ups (1980), Topsy-Turvy (1999), All or Nothing (2002), A Running Jump (2012) and on stage at the National Theatre in Grief (September 2011). His final film role was a cameo appearance in Leigh's Mr. Turner (2014).

Kelly's later roles were as the ARP warden in Nanny McPhee and the Big Bang (2010), and as the old boatman, John Merdell, in the ITV production of Dead Man's Folly in the final (2013) series of Agatha Christie’s Poirot, the last episode of the series to be filmed.

On 23 July 2010, Kelly guest-starred as Martin in the sitcom My Family in the episode Desperately Stalking Susan. From October 2010 to February 2011, he starred in When We Are Married at London's Garrick Theatre.

== Personal life, illness, and death ==
Kelly was in a long-term relationship with journalist and psychotherapist Grace Pieniazek until she died in 2009.

Kelly returned to Wicked as the Wizard on 18 November 2013. It was reported in January 2014 that Kelly had temporarily departed the production due to ill health.

He was admitted to a hospice on 13 June 2014 and died early the next morning, aged 70, after a long battle with cancer.
