= Community-based tourism in Myanmar =

Community-based tourism, also known as CBT, is a kind of tourism operated and managed by the local community for the sake of the well-being of the particular community through providing a mechanism for sustainable livelihoods. It means preserving socio-culture such as traditions and enhancing the socio-economic situations of a particular community. CBT concentrates on economically vulnerable villages and developing countries because CBT is an alternative for economic development as well as conservation and protection of natural resources of those villages. The term CBT was not common until 2012, when the country emerged from political isolation. The country became politically more open, and the nation's doors were open for traveling. Vast foreign investments along with vast tourists, were ready to explore the unknown country. There is a wide range of activities to do, depending on the location of the villages. Some villages offer water activities, and some may not. In the process of implementing CBT villages, non-profit organizations like ActionAid Myanmar also takes part in the process. The ultimate goal of CBT is to generate profits by offering tourists local lifestyles, accommodation, local activities, and culture. Despite its advantages, there are also setbacks while running CBT villages, such as not having adequate both human resources and technical resources.

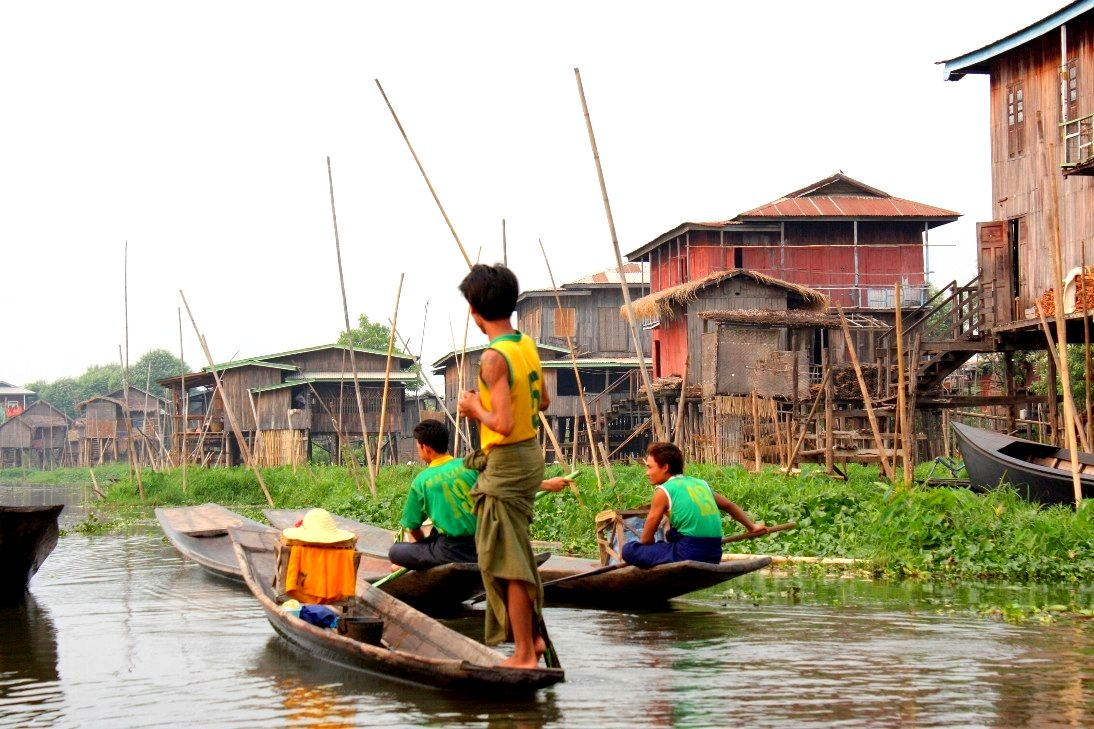
Inle Lake (Southern Shan State), one of the CBT sites in Shan State

== History ==
Myanmar started its political transformation in 2012, after decades of political isolation. Life before 2012 was commute, and there were no connections with the outside world. Doors to other countries were not available much. The majority of people were poor, and the livelihood of the people was substandard. The transition from military dictatorships to a more democratic country led to the implementation of CBT. As a result, tourists became more interested in exploring these pristine and unspoiled sites. Moreover, CBT was included in the 100 Days Plan, the government's reformed agenda. The 100 days was set by the National League of Democracy, accompanied by an optimist view that aimed to work towards the priorities and convenience of the public, such as the development of transport infrastructure, telecommunication, and so on. The tourism Industry became flourished as one of the economic sectors for the sake of generating foreign revenues, protecting local traditions culture, environment, expansion of employment after the country was emancipated from the military regime in 2010.

== General structure ==
Even though CBT solely focuses on the community of the host villages, some of the decisions depend on the government's approval or the head of the villages. Most of the villages have heads of the village who would be the medium between the villagers, the professionals, organizations, and the government. Communities must be consulted and involved in the decision-making process on tourism planning and management, which directly affect their livelihoods. However, final decisions shall be made in coordination with the public sector and with the approval of the public administration. Some of the villages are ruled by abbots or monks under the teachings of the monk and the Buddha. CBT prefers the bottom-up decision approach rather than top-bottom decisions where the majority of the votes are determined by the villagers.

== Services ==
CBT villages offer a wide variety of activities and services depending on the location of the villages. Some of the common activities are listed down below.

- Bird watching
- Visiting religious sites
- Fishing
- Handicrafts
- Trekking
- Participating in local festivals

Services like bird-watching are common around Ayeyarwaddy Delta and central Myanmar. Since Myanmar is a Buddhist country, apart from villages in upper Myanmar, most of the CBT villages have religious sites to visit such as monasteries, temples, and pagodas where tourists can learn local culture, buy souvenirs, and participate in local festivals. Some of the activities are not common, and only a specific CBT village can offer that service such as AyeYarWaddy Dolphine Sanctuary. Some of the villages are located near the lakes and streams so tourists can also enjoy swimming in them and the villages provide transportations for them. Typically, some youths can speak decent English to communicate back to the tourists because the majority of the villagers are not fluent in English.

== Challenges ==
CBT villages have poor access to adequate basic necessities such as proper sanitation, electricity, infrastructures, finance etc. As a result, the villages have different electricity distribution times. CBT villages do not have infrastructures besides basic housing. Since some of the villages are very commuted, it is very hard to get access to the proper medical treatment. Due to the location being so remote, the connection of the mobile phone or cellular networks is very poor. There is a problem regarding accommodations for tourists. For the accommodation, some of the villages build (B&B) Bed and Breakfast. In order to build a B&B, the villages first need to get a B&B license. Some villages do not even have B&B, and tourists stay in host families' houses. Some of the families accept boys only and some girls only. For boys, they are allowed to stay in the monastery compound, but for girls, it is inappropriate.

Since Myanmar is a developing country, tourism is not flourished yet, and tourists are quite unfamiliar with this country. The political unrest in the country also impacts the image of the country, subsequently affecting tourism. For a startup tourism like CBT, it is harder to get tourists noticed because it is not marketed widely, and there is not sufficient information about CBT villages as well. Deficiency of human capital is also a challenge for CBT villages because some of the youths in those villages emigrated to neighboring countries to get a well-paid job to support back to their families.

The majority of the villagers do not have a proper education. Only a few are high school graduates, and college graduates are quite rare. There is only one public school at most, and that school only has till primary school grade (Grade 4 in Myanmar education system). As a result, they do not have a good command of English. It is hard for an ordinary villager to communicate with tourists. That subsequently leads to a lack of understanding of the needs and wants of the tourists.

== Goals ==
The main goal of implementing CBT is that the profits gained from tourism will significantly benefit the livelihood of the community as an additional income besides farming. In this way, CBT can sustain minimally disruptive tourism to the local environment while increasing economic opportunities in a way that is sustainable, community-driven which would benefit the entire community. CBT is working to concentrate more on the voice of the villagers. CBT targets bottom-up decision where the locals have direct decision-making policies.

Another goal of CBT's is the poverty reduction. The main source of income becomes from agriculture and the emigrants sending money back to their families. CBT goal is to provide an alternative or additional way of income for the reduction of poverty. One of the statements made by the National League of Democracy is to welcome visitors who are keen to promote the welfare of the ordinary people and the conservation of the environment and to acquire an insight into the cultural, political, and social life of the country while enjoying a happy and a fulfilling holiday in Myanmar. The majority of the tourist destination sites are located in Mandalay, Bagan, and Yangon. CBT villagers want to minimize the number of tourists in the concentrated area; instead, they want to generate job opportunities and income for the indigenous people in the rural areas. Since CBT villages lack both capitals and human resources, it is one of the goals is to build local capacities such as training for workshops, communication skills, and knowledge.

== Local and tourists' perspectives ==
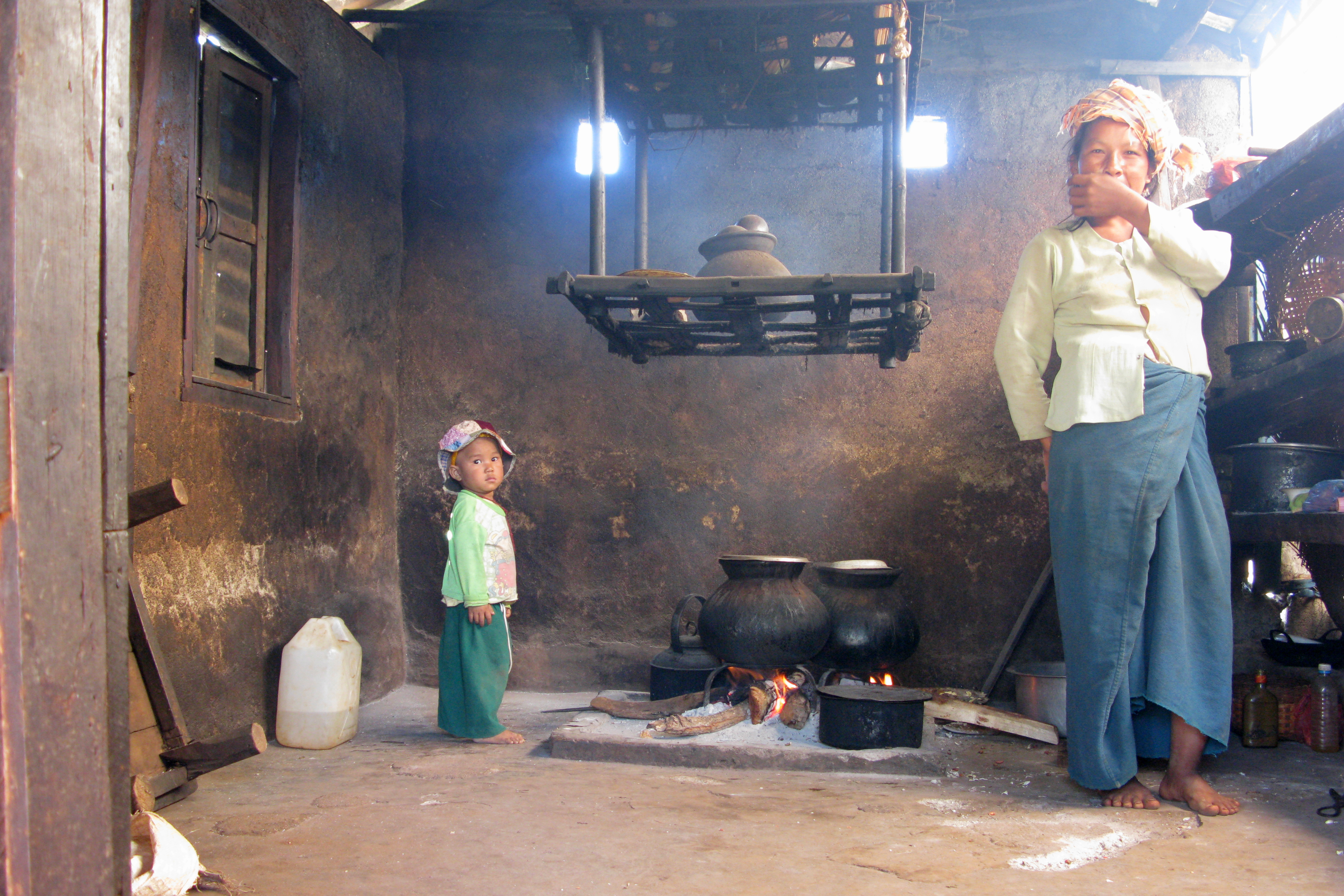
Local family in the kitchen, Kalaw area of Shan Hills

When it comes to CBT tourism, there are two sides: the local and the tourist. The perspectives of the locals are different depending on their assumptions of CBT. The locals of the CBT villages think that tourists mostly come because of nature, and sometimes because of the sun. The tourists want to feel the sunlight despite the scorching heat because the sun is rare to see in certain parts of the world. Some locals are very trilled to serve those tourists not because of money because years ago, they do not have any chance to interact with tourists directly and there were not many tourists after all. On the other hand, some locals assert that what tourists bring is trash, and these tourists are exploiting their resources.

There is one problem with CBT villages. Before these villages became CBT, they were just poor villages. As a result, youths from those villages started to emigrant to neighboring countries, mostly Thailand and Malaysia. Those emigrants thought that they could support their families only if they work outside of the country. When CBT was implemented, this kind of problem was partially solved because CBT will contribute to those families' income.

From the tourist's perspective, despite the lack of infrastructure and sanitation, they still enjoy coming to CBT villages. Some tourists have difficulties in finding information about tourism and the CBT villages because they cannot find much information on the internet. Tourists state that they can bring some culture back to their countries. At the same time, Myanmar people, especially from the poor background, can also get an idea of the outside world about how the world is rapidly changing, how other people are doing, and how kind of people there are out in the world.

== Locations in Myanmar ==
CBT villages can be found in every corner of Myanmar, offering different kinds of activities based on the location of a particular village. These are some of the lists of CBT villages in Myanmar.

States and Division	Villages
Kahin State	Lone Tone Village Haipu Village Nant Mee Laung He Village Nyaung Pyinat Village
Kayah State	Pan Pet Village Tanilarle Village one Kayaw ethnic Village Hta Nee La Lah Village Pan Pet Kayah Village Daw Ta Ma Gyi Village Htay Kho Village Demwaso in Kayah Statehood
Kayin State	Thandaungyi Chin State Sorlong village Ta Suan village Rakhine State Jetetaw Fishing Village Kyeintali Village
Shan State	Lwe Kaw Village Inne Village Hteenae Village Kakku Village Pin Sein Pin Village Sikyaa Inn Village Lwenwe Phaya Taung Yay Seit Village Samkar Village Ywar Ngan Village Lwal Pann Sone Village Pa O self Administration Zone in Shan State
Yangon Division	Twante (Kalatharpura) Kyaikthalae Village
Mandalay Division	Sithe Village MyitKanGyi Village YwarThit Village Myay Sun Village Sein Pan Gone Village Aye Kyun Village HsinKyun Village Sin Taung Ayeyarwaddy Dolphine Sanctuary
Magway Division	East Kantawgyi Village West Kantawgyi Village SuLePan Village InYaung Village Magyikan Village Htan Pin Kone Village Khun Khaly Village
Sagaing Division	Nwe Nyeing Village Zalon Taung
Thanintharyi Division	San Hlan Makyonegalet Village Donnyaungmhine Village
