= Second City Firsts =

British TV anthology series (1973–1978)

- Opening title, 1973
- Genre: Drama anthology
- Country of origin: United Kingdom
- Original language: English
- No. of seasons: 9
- No. of episodes: 53 (22 missing)

Production
- Producers: Barry Hanson; Tara Prem
- Running time: 30 minutes
- Production company: BBC

Original release
- Network: BBC 2
- Release: 15 October 1973 – 13 May 1978

Second City Firsts is a British drama anthology series of single plays, broadcast by the BBC, all lasting thirty minutes. Recorded at BBC Pebble Mill in Birmingham, or sometimes filmed on location, the series was broadcast between 15 October 1973 and 13 May 1978.

The series title referred both to Pebble Mill's location in England's Second City, and the fact that the series commissioned an unprecedented amount of first-time writers.

== Summary ==
The 1974 episode "Girl", about a homosexual relationship between two members in the Women's Royal Army Corps, featured the first lesbian (and same-sex) kiss on British television, between Alison Steadman (as Jackie) and Myra Frances (as Harvey). The recording of the episode was discovered in the Thames Television archives decades later, and digitised by the BBC. In 2016, it was added to the BBC Store's "Prejudice and Pride Collection" and made available for streaming.

The 1975 episode "Club Havana" featured actress Julie Walters in her first television role. The transmission tape for the episode is missing, however unedited studio footage survives containing the entire play, but without the opening titles.

The 1976 episode "Jack Flea's Birthday Celebration" was written by Ian McEwan, his screen debut.

== Series overview ==
Series	Episodes	Originally released	
Series	Episodes	First released	Last released
1	6	15 October 1973	19 November 1973
2	6	18 February 1974	25 March 1974
3	7	28 October 1974	16 December 1974
4	6	20 March 1975	24 April 1975
5	6	25 October 1975	29 November 1975
6	6	13 March 1976	24 April 1976
7	5	14 November 1976	12 December 1976
8	6	3 May 1977	6 June 1977
9	5	8 April 1978	13 May 1978

== List of episodes ==
Legend: No.overall = Episode overall; No. in Series = Episode in series; AS/A = Archive status/Availability
Abbreviations: DV = domestic videotape recording; CF = colour film; SEQ = sequence(s); VT = 2" videotape

=== Series 1 (1973) ===
No. overall	No. in series	Title	Directed by	Written by	AS/A	Original release date
1	1	"The Medium"	Michael Simpson	Denise Robertson	VT	15 October 1973
Norah Fulton (Beattie), Valerie Georgeson (Jean), Winefride Shelley (The Medium), Jean Heywood (Alice), Adrienne Frank (Rita), Lyn Douglas (Dolly), Barbara Miller (Kath).
2	2	"Mrs Pool's Preserves"	Philip Saville	Michael Sadler	Missing	22 October 1973
Elizabeth Spriggs (Zena Pool), Dinsdale Landen (Adie Pool), Angela Scoular (Astral Philips).
3	3	"If a Man Answers"	Barry Hanson	Brian Glover	DV	29 October 1973
Edward Peel (Royston), Deirdre Costello (Janet), David Daker (Peter), Malcolm Rogers (Ken), Harry Markham (George).
4	4	"The Movers"	Brian Parker	Ian Taylor	Missing	5 November 1973
John Woodnutt (Cecil), Graham Ashley (John), Ken Kitson (Martin), Zara Jaber (Mrs Shakespeare).
5	5	"King of the Castle"	Matthew Robinson	Willie Russell	Missing	12 November 1973
Robert Putt (Abby), David Williams (Jimmy), Bill Maxwell (Brocky), Mary Healey (Josie), Liz McKenzie (Pat), Stanley Dawson (Ronnie), Blake Butler (Jackson), John Owens (Fitz).
6	6	"Patrons"	Michael Lindsay-Hogg	Eric Berger	Missing	19 November 1973
Max Wall (Harry), Jack Shepherd (Gordon), Steve Plytas (Hersh), Leonard Fenton (Hymie), Bernard Stone (Meyer), Pamela Manson (Kitty).

=== Series 2 (1974) ===
No. overall	No. in series	Title	Directed by	Written by	AS/A	Original release date
7	1	"Humbug, Finger or Thumb?"	Robert Knights	Arthur Hopcraft	Missing	18 February 1974
Alun Armstrong (Ken), Oliver Cotton (Cyril).
8	2	"Girl"	Peter Gill	James Robson	DV	25 February 1974
Myra Frances (Harvey), Alison Steadman (Jackie), Eileen McCallum (Bailey), Stella Moray (Maggie).
9	3	"Bold Face – Condensed"	John Bruce	Peter Ransley	VT	4 March 1974
Michael Gambon (John), Terence Budd (Steve), Geoffrey Reed (Stan).
10	4	"The Actual Woman"	Philip Saville	Jack Shepherd	DV	11 March 1974
Tom Bell (Sidney), Annabel Leventon (Caro), Malcolm Terris (Alec), Richard Gurgal (Toby), Deborah Lee (Kate).
11	5	"Match of the Day"	Stephen Frears	Neville Smith	CF	18 March 1974
Neville Smith (Chance), Anne Zelda (Jean-Ann), Bill Dean (Father), Gladys Ambrose (Mother), Alison Chantler (Veronica), Malcolm Terris (Eric), Deborah Black (The Mate), Mike Hayden (Priest).
12	6	"Lunch Duty"	Barry Hanson	Ronny Robinson	Missing	25 March 1974
Anne Raitt (Janet), Donald Douglas (Keith Peters), Paul Rosebury (Richard), Richard Butler (Janet's Father).

=== Series 3 (1974) ===
No. overall	No. in series	Title	Directed by	Written by	AS/A	Original release date
13	1	"Pig Bin"	Tara Prem	Brian Glover	DV	28 October 1974
Philip Jackson (Ken), Gary Hopkins (Dave), Michael Elphick (Policeman).
14	2	"Sunday Tea"	Les Bliar	Edwin Pearce	Missing	4 November 1974
Mike Grady (Derry), Sheila Kelley (Maple), Kenneth Hadley (Adam).
15	3	"Silence"	Ian Wyatt	John Fletcher	Missing	11 November 1974
William Moore (Frank), Tony Caunter (Peter), David Delve (Mitch), Percy Herbert (Williams), Anna Wing (Annie).
16	4	"Fight for Shelton Bar"	Peter Cheeseman	n/a	DV	18 November 1974
Bob Eaton, John Darrell, Dyfed Thomas, Graham Watkins, Bill Thomas, David Miller, Nick Darke, Jim Wiggins, Alan Gill, Zoë Gonord, Romy Saunders, Polly Warren, Sandy Walsh.
17	5	"Squire"	Barry Hanson	Tom Pickard	CF	25 November 1974
Alan Hull (Alfy), Madelaine Newton (Mary), Matthew Pickard (Matthew), Catherine Pickard (Catherine), Richard Steele (Auctioneer), Bob Ritchie (Bailiff), Brian Lewis (Clerk), Hugh Turner (Barman), Max Ford (Porter), Lee Melvin (Man in Crowd).
18	6	"Too Hot to Handle"	Pam Brighton	Jim Hawkins	Missing	2 December 1974
Jane Wood (Suzanne Mitchell), William Hoyland (Peter Mitchell), Diana Rayworth (Val).
19	7	"The Festive Poacher"	Tara Prem	Ian Taylor	Missing	16 December 1974
Liz Smith (Mrs Murphy), Bernard Wrigley (Tommy), Susan Tracy (Christine).

=== Series 4 (1975) ===
No. overall	No. in series	Title	Directed by	Written by	AS/A	Original release date
20	1	"Early to Bed"	Les Blair	Alan Bleasdale	CF	20 March 1975
David Warwick (Vinny), Alison Steadman (Helen), Patricia Leach (Mother), Johnny Meadows (Frankie), Clifford Kershaw (Mr Hughes), Ashley Thompson (Postman), Charles Hatton (Frankie's Mate), Cliff Duncan (Frankie's Mate), Barbara Ru-An (Diana Marina), Sylvia McDonald (Musician), Jack McDonald (Musician).
21	2	"Swallows"	Robert Kidd	John McGahern	Missing	27 March 1975
Michael Brennan (Sergeant), Frank Kelly (Surveyor), Julie Hamilton (Biddy), Richard Oliver (Michael), Harry Webster (Priest).
23	3	"Waiting at the Field Gate"	Jane Howell	James Robson	DV	3 April 1975
Jim Norton (Rainmarsh), Brian Glover (Gallat), Bill Dean (Ted), Ted Carroll (Mixer), Peter Benson (Mack), Bob Peck (Reg), Paul Jesson (Ron), Margot Leicester (Lucy Rainmarsh).
24	4	"The Permissive Society"	Mike Leigh	Mike Leigh	VT	10 April 1975
Bob Mason (Les), Rachel Davies (Yvonne), Veronica Roberts (Carol).
25	5	"The Frank Crank Story"	Peter Campbell	Alan C. Taylor	VT	17 April 1975
Arthur English (Charlie), Paul Bacon (Frank), Andonia Katsaros (Woman), Nicholas Wood (Violinist), Althea Gaye (Pianist), Norman Parker (Drummer).
26	6	"Released"	Roger Tucker	Stephen Wakelam	Missing	24 April 1975
Christopher Blake (Paul Finnie), Sheila Felvin (Carol), Kathleen Michael (Mrs Finnie), Alan Tilvern (Mr Finnie), Ken Kitson (Barry), Michael Duggan (Trev), Tony Leivers (Charlie).

=== Series 5 (1975) ===
No. overall	No. in series	Title	Directed by	Written by	AS/A	Original release date
27	1	"Club Havana"	Pam Brighton	Barry Reckord	VT	25 October 1975
Don Warrington (Dave), Mona Hammond (Mrs Jordan), Julie Walters (Terry), Frank Singuineau (Jim), Alfred Fagon (Rasta Man).
28	2	"The Writing on the Wall"	Mike Bradwell	Mike Bradwell	Missing	1 November 1975
Cass Patton (Suki), Alan Hulse (John), Rachel Bell (Rosie), Joseph Peters (Kevin).
29	3	"How It Is"	Tara Prem	Anita Bronson	Missing	8 November 1975
Vivienne Burgess (Dolly), Sebastian Shaw (Bill), Maggie Petersen (Alice), Lorraine Peters (Mrs Cooper).
30	4	"On the Good Ship Yacki-Hicki-Doola"	Les Blair	Bob Mason	Missing	15 November 1975
David Threlfall (Gaz), Christopher Neil (Bonehead), Lennox Greaves (Paul), Gerard Ryder (Michael).
31	5	"Thwum"	Pedr James	Mike Stott	SEQ	22 November 1975
Rosalind Elliot (Joy), Pete Postlethwaite (Duffy), Paul Moriarty (Bernard).
32	6	"The Healing"	Christopher King	Laura Lamson	CF	29 November 1975
James Garbutt (Jackie), Adrian Pearson (John), Jean Heywood (Mary), Peter Welch (Trustee), Vernon Drake (Minister), Fred Pearson (Publican), Roy Pattison (Veterinary Officer), Sheri Shepstone (Minister's Wife), Sylvia Stoker (Invalid), George Irving (Preacher).

=== Series 6 (1976) ===
No. overall	No. in series	Title	Directed by	Written by	AS/A	Original release date
33	1	"Trotsky is Dead"	Tony Bicât	Tony Bicât	VT	13 March 1976
Lila Kedrova (Natasha), George Pravda (Sergei), Gerard Ryder (Ivan), Catherine Willmer (Katya), Vickery Turner (Caroline), Gabor Vernon (Vladimir).
33	2	"The Visitor"	Brian Parker	Denise Robertson	SEQ	20 March 1976
Kathleen Helme (Ellen), Judi Lamb (Linda), Dick Irwin (Badge), Robert Atkin (Davy).
34	3	"Do You Dig It?"	Pedr James	John Harding	DV	3 April 1976
John Burrows (Russel), John Harding (The Other Man), Gwen Taylor (The Woman).
35	4	"Jack Flea's Birthday Celebration"	Mike Newell	Ian McEwan	VT	10 April 1976
Sara Kestelman (Ruth), David Wilkinson (David), Eileen McCallum (Mrs Lee), Ivor Roberts (Mr Lee).
36	5	"Black Bird Shout"	Jane Howell	Paul Hyland	SEQ	17 April 1976
Ron Pember (Don), Pamela Miles (Grace), Joan-Ann Maynard (Nurse), Patsy Smart (Mrs Barber).
37	6	"Travelling Free"	Tara Prem	Sean McCarthy	VT	24 April 1976
Tony Rohr (Donal), Tom Owens (Pat), Cathyrn McGirr (Eileen), Brenda Doyle (Mary), Farrell Sheridan (Tom).

=== Series 7 (1976) ===
No. overall	No. in series	Title	Directed by	Written by	AS/A	Original release date
38	1	"Summer Season"	Michael Tuchner	Brian Glover	CF	14 November 1976
Paul Shane (Ricky Avon), Rachel Davies (Michelle Grant), Tommy Boyle (Dave), Paula Tilbrook (Bea), Harry Jones (Tom Bredin), Amanda Walker (Anne Bredin), Darren Weston (Glen Bredin), Ced Beaumont (Arthur Betton), Elizabeth Benson (Kath Betton), Julie Shipley (Carol Betton), Debbie Brotherton (Carol's Friend), Nat Jackley (Fred), Bert Palmer (Joe), Joseph Berry (Stan Rylands), Marie Dixon (Edna), Earl Deacon (Drunk).
39	2	"Knock for Knock"	Mike Leigh	Mike Leigh	Missing	21 November 1976
Sam Kelly (Mr Bowes), Anthony O'Donnell (Mr Purvis), Meryl Hampton (Marilyn).
40	3	"Glitter"	Tony Bicât	Tony Bicât	DV	28 November 1976
Toyah Willcox (Sue), Phil Daniels (Barry), Dixie Dean (Ray Gutburg), Noel Edmonds (Self), Doremy Vernon (Sue's Mother), Bilbo Baggins (Pop Group).
41	4	"Dreamboat"	Chris Menaul	Ian Taylor	DV	5 December 1976
Geoffrey Greenhill (Harker), Mark Buffery (Sunshine), Joanna Palmer (Jane), Penelope Nice (Cath).
42	5	"Percy and Kenneth"	Robert Tronson	Mary O'Malley	Missing	12 December 1976
Herbert Ramskill (Percy Blackhouse), Joe Gladwin (Kenneth Hardwick), Colin Crompton (Angel).

=== Series 8 (1977) ===
No. overall	No. in series	Title	Directed by	Written by	AS/A	Original release date
43	1	"Twelve Off the Belt"	Roland Joffe	Ron Hutchinson	VT	3 May 1977
Ivor Roberts (Jimmy Quinn), Diana Davies (Vera Greenall), Richard Griffiths (Bedworth Hog), John Barrett (Eggy Greenall), Eli Woods (Billy), Letitia Bowater (Go-Go Dancer), Rosemary Warwick (Go-Go Dancer), Len Annett (Doorman), Emrys Evans (Snailman).
44	2	"Postcards from Southsea"	Colin Bucksey	J. C. W. Brook	Missing	10 May 1977
Shirley Cheriton (Anne), Sharman MacDonald (Gloria), Eric Deacon (Mike), Steven Beard (Clive), Graham McCabe (Young Man).
45	3	"Daft Mam's Blues"	Alan Dossor	David Halliwell	DV	17 May 1977
Jean Heywood (Gladys), Frances Cox (Iris), Marjorie Yates (Lily, As A Young Woman), Bernard Hill (Billy), Molly Veness (Old Lily), Steve Halliwell (Stan).
46	4	"In the Dead Spell"	Claude Whatham	James Robson	DV	24 May 1977
Ivor Roberts (Mr Coleman), Frank Grimes (Ian Coleman), Manning Wilson (Uncle Walt).
47	5	"Waifs and Strays"	Chris Bailey	Brian Parker	VT	31 May 1977
Noël Dyson (Patricia), Sara Clee (Brenda), David Stoll (Frank), Ken Kitson (Roy), Matthew Stuart Marlow (Winston).
48	6	"Fattening Frogs for Snakes"	Alex Marshall	Janey Preger	Missing	6 June 1977
George Costigan (Trevor), Catherine Kessler (Angie), Emlyn Price (Steve), Dicken Ashworth (Jimmy), Barbara Waddington (Lynette).

=== Series 9 (1978) ===
No. overall	No. in series	Title	Directed by	Written by	AS/A	Original release date
49	1	"The Back Page"	Derek Lister	Stan Hey; Andrew Nickolds	VT	8 April 1978
Graham Stark (Bert Reynolds), Henry Moxon (Percy), Howard Southern (Molotov), John Salthouse (Binoculars), Roger Avon (Sergeant), Myrtle Devenish (Mrs Beale).
50	2	"Shall I See You Now"	Pedr James	Mary O'Malley	VT	15 April 1978
Toby Salaman (Dennis), George Selway (Walter), Pam St.Clement (Carmel), Richard Albrecht (Jonathan), Marilyn Finlay (Sister), Martin C. Thurley (Doctor Harwood), Margaret Durnell (Night Nurse).
51	3	"The Lady Irene"	John Bruce	Tony Hadaway	VT	22 April 1978
Michelle Newell (Irene), David Orrick (Bobby), John Bowler (Eddie), Cilla Mason (Mrs Bennett).
52	4	"Mucking Out"	Derek Lister	Robert Holman	VT	6 May 1978
Ray Smith (Thomas Loftus), Paul Copley (Brian Wilson).
53	5	"Rotten"	Philip Saville	Alan Brown	VT	13 May 1978
Alan Raymond (Kevin), Georgina Smith (Mum), John Smith (Dad), Theresa Ratcliff (Suzy), Betty Jo (Carol), Ray Kingsley (Cummo).

== Archive holdings ==
Of the 53 plays in the series, only 19 episodes survive in broadcast quality, a further 11 episodes exist in various domestic videotape formats and sequences exist from 3 partially lost episodes. While a total of 19 episodes are currently entirely missing from the archives.

== See also ==
Other BBC2 drama anthology series include:

- Theatre 625
- BBC2 Playhouse
- Thirty-Minute Theatre
- Screen Two
- Stage 2
