= Ikorongo Game Reserve =

Game reserve in Tanzania

- Area: 602.74 km^{2} (232.72 sq mi)
- Designation: Game reserve
- Designated: 1993
- Governing body: Tanzania National Parks (TANAPA)

The Ikorongo Game Reserve is a game reserve in Tanzania. The reserve was established in 1993. The site has an area of roughly 600 km^{2} (230 sq mi). It is located along the left side of the northern part of Serengeti National Park.

The Ikorongo is rich in species of wild animals as the reserve have several rivers crisscrossing. Elephants, Rhinos, Giraffes, Buffalo, Greater and Lesser Kudu, Hyenas, Baboons, Zebras, Lions, Wild dogs, Grant's and Thomson's gazelles, Topis, Warthogs and Duikers can be found here. Of the plants there are Riverine, wooded grasslands and acacias.
