= Knock-for-knock agreement =

Agreement between insurance companies

A knock-for-knock agreement is an agreement between two insurance companies whereby, when both companies' policy-holders incur losses in the same insured event (usually a motor accident), each insurer pays the losses sustained by its own policy-holder regardless of who was responsible.

== Rationale ==
The rationale is economic and administrative efficiency: While an insurer may be able to pursue a recovery from the party responsible for an accident or from its policy-holder, this is a costly administrative procedure. The knock-for-knock agreement simplifies recovery claims among insurers and, over time, attributes costs fairly among insurers.

However, knock-for-knock agreements between insurers have been criticised as unfair on the party not responsible for an accident. If, for the sake of administrative ease, an insurer pays out to repair damage done to its policy-holder's own car instead of pursuing the party responsible for the accident for all relevant costs, an effective claim is recorded against that policy-holder's insurance record. In this way, knock-for-knock agreements can result in policy-holders finding unexpectedly, when they come to renew their insurance, that they face higher premiums regardless of responsibility for an accident they were involved in.

== Other contexts ==
=== Military claims ===
'Knock for knock' is also used in a specific, analogous sense, for example, the following, cited in the "Laws of War", from the US Army website:

In addition to handling these routine matters, the chief of the Claims Section participated in the negotiations with the Korean government concerning the payment of foreign claims generated by troops of the Army of the Republic of Korea who were active in South Vietnam. In fact, the MACV Staff judge Advocate's office was to play a vital role in the negotiation and implementation of certain claims agreements with the Vietnamese government and the Free World allies which came to be known as "knock-for-knock" agreements. These compacts contained provisions whereby the government of one nation waived the claims against the government of the second nation for damage to government property. The agreements did not, however, waive the personal right of an individual to claim damages in the case of negligence of a member of the force of another allied nation. The arrangements nevertheless removed a potential irritant to the relationships among the Free World forces.

=== Oil and gas industry ===
'Knock for knock' is a common contractual arrangement in the oil and gas industry. The operator of an oil and gas property requires the assistance and expertise of many kinds of contractors, including drilling companies, well service companies, facility constructors, equipment suppliers, and caterers. Generally, the operator will engage these services under a master service agreement which sets forth the essential commercial terms under which the work will be performed. One of these terms is the allocation of the risk of loss to people and property. In general, a knock-for-knock agreement means that each party working on an oil and gas worksite—the operator and each contractor—agrees to protect and indemnify all the other parties against injuries to that party's employees and agents, and destruction or damage to that party's property. This allocation is not based upon the fault or culpability of the party whose employee was injured or whose property was damaged. The goal is the efficient defense and payment of a claim through having a single party responsible for the loss.
