= Loita Plains =

Savanna in Kenya

Coordinates: 01°48′S 35°41′E

- Savanna
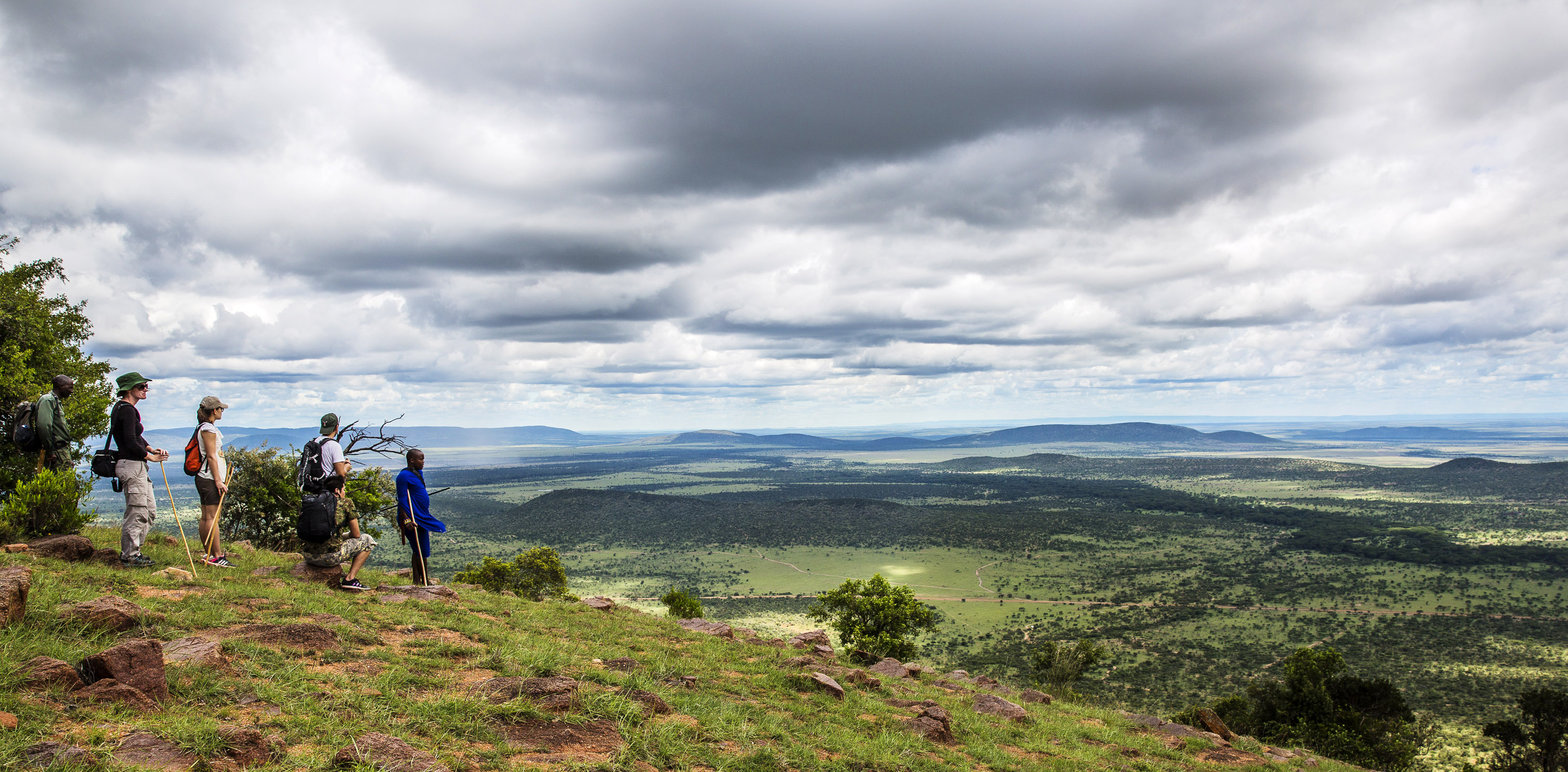
- View of Loita Plains and Hills in Kenya
- Location: Great Rift Valley, Kenya

The Loita Plains are a savanna and pastoral grazing ground in the southern Great Rift Valley in Kenya, just north of the Maasai Mara.

The plains and nearby Loita Hills have been the territory of the Maasai peoples since the 19th century and now include ranches and fences. Extensive surveys of the Loita Plains ecosystem were carried out by Vershuren and Misonne, the later an experienced taxonomist, in 1962–3. Focusing on small rodents, they found that most specimens were African grass rats or Natal multimammate mice, but that overall species diversity was very high.

In the northern Loita Plains, a substantial amount of land was converted to wheat field in the 1980s. This practice later declined, but not before reducing the Loita wildebeest migration from 130,000 to only 30,000 individuals within a span of 15 years, mostly through blocking migration routes with fences. The Loita Plains were especially important to wildebeest during the wet season; during the dry seasons animals would move south to the Maasai Mara and meet up with Tanzanian wildebeest from the Serengeti.

== See also ==
- East Africa
- Serengeti
