= Loita Hills =

Region in Kenya

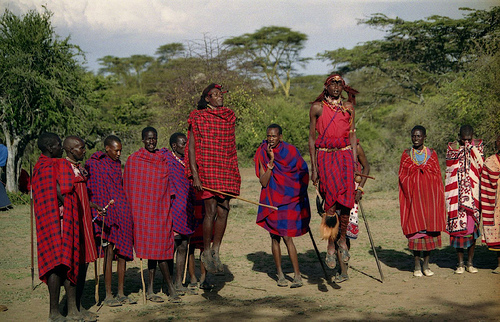
Maasai people in the Loita Hills

The Loita Hills are a region of Kenya.

== History ==
The Loita Hills are the traditional lands of the Maasai people. The locals refer to the Forest of the Lost Child.

== Environment ==
The Loita Community Wildlife Conservancy operates in the Loita Hills.

== See also ==
- Loita Plains
