= Henry Crichton (cricketer) =

English cricketer

Personal information
- Full name: Henry Thompson Crichton
- Born: 18 May 1884; Edgbaston, Warwickshire, England
- Died: 1 July 1968 (aged 84); Branksome Park, Dorset, England
- Batting: Right-handed
- Bowling: Right-arm medium
- Relatives: Sam Troughton (great-grandson); Jim Troughton (great-grandson); William Troughton (great-grandson); Harry Edward Melling (great-grandson)

Domestic team information
- Years: Team
- 1908: Warwickshire
- 1913: Berkshire

Career statistics
Competition	First-class
Matches	2
Runs scored	26
Batting average	8.66
100s/50s	0/0
Top score	26
Balls bowled	48
Wickets	2
Bowling average	15.00
5 wickets in innings	0
10 wickets in match	0
Best bowling	2/21
Catches/stumpings	0/–
- Source: Cricinfo, 9 December 2011

Henry Thompson Crichton (18 May 1884 – 1 July 1968) was an English cricketer. Crichton was a right-handed batsman who bowled right-arm medium pace. He was born in Edgbaston, Warwickshire, and was educated at King Edward's School, Birmingham.

Crichton made two first-class appearances for Warwickshire in the 1908 County Championship against Sussex and Hampshire. In the match against Sussex, Crichton was dismissed for a duck in Warwickshire's first innings by John Vincett. In Sussex's first innings he took the wickets of Ernest Killick and George Cox, finishing with figures of 2/21 from six overs, with the match ending in a draw. Against Hampshire he was dismissed for a duck in Warwickshire's first innings by Jack Newman, and in their second innings he was promoted to open the batting, scoring 26 runs before being caught by Alex Bowell off Charlie Llewellyn. Warwickshire won the match by 6 wickets.

He later made two appearances for Berkshire in the 1913 Minor Counties Championship against Dorset and Buckinghamshire. He died at Branksome Park, Dorset, on 1 July 1968. His great-grandson Jim Troughton was a first-class cricketer who played for England.
