= Mill Hill County High School =

Location
- Worcester Crescent; Mill Hill, London, NW7 4LL; England; 51.6295°N 0.2485°W

Information
- Type: Partially selective academy
- Motto: Altiora Peto (Latin); I Seek Higher Things
- Religious affiliation: Does Not Apply
- Established: 1931
- Department for Education URN: 137386 Tables
- Ofsted: Reports
- Chair of Governors: Jill Hamilton
- Headteacher: Andy Stainton
- Staff: 150 +
- Gender: Mixed
- Age: 11 to 18
- Enrolment: 1706
- Houses: Neptune, Jupiter, Mars, Saturn
- Colours: Navy, Red
- Website: http://www.mhchs.org.uk

Mill Hill County High School is a large secondary school with academy status located in Mill Hill, London, England. It was the first comprehensive school in the United Kingdom to have had a student accepted on the Morehead-Cain merit scholarship programme in the United States and is an official Morehead-Cain nominating school. The previous headteacher, Geoffrey Thompson, was retired in 2019 and has preceded Andrew "Andy" Stainton.

== Uniform ==
Children must wear school uniform, from years 7-11. Sixth Form must wear modern businesswear. The school consists of a red and blue blazer, ties (black, red, green, blue and silver), pullover with the school crest, and a white blouse. You also need to wear your house lanyard and skirts/trousers. Different subjects also offer equipment you need, such as red aprons for DT, PE kit, trainers/football boots and calculators for maths.

== Houses and Enrichment ==
The school has a variety of enrichment, including music, art and dance. Many students attend these to broaden their knowledge and make new friends. There are also programs, such as Antibullying Ambassadors, which have won the Diana Award. There are 4 houses, Neptune, Jupiter, Saturn and Mars. These houses have competitions such as sports day, football and House Games. Every year a music show is hosted, and there is a club where you can design clothes for the school show, led by Miss Oakley. Teachers have class codes, e.g Miss Oakley’s code is SOY.

== History ==
The school was built in August 25, 1931 by the Mill Hill Schools Foundation. The current school was created as a merger between Moat Mount Comprehensive and Orange Hill school in Burnt Oak after the latter was closed. Orange Hill had originally been a grammar school and Moat Mount a secondary modern before the ending of the grammar school system in the Borough of Barnet in the early seventies. Moat Mount Comprehensive had a sixth form of up to 80 pupils in the mid-Seventies and a total school population of around 970 pupils. In contrast, the school was notable for its "Good" report established by Ofsted. It has stated how mature the pupils were and how teachers were experts in their roles.

== Admissions ==
It is for students aged 11 to 18. The school has 1,684 pupils as of the 2023/2024 school year. As of 2025/2026, the school has 1,538 pupils. There are 500 sixth formers. The current headteacher is Andy Stainton, who has succeeded Geoffrey Thompson. Thompson has retired in 2019, which caused him to depart the school.

== Subjects ==
=== At Key Stage 3 all students study ===
- English
- Mathematics
- Science (Biology, Chemistry, Physics)
- Computer Science
- Design and Technology
- Food Technology
- Religious Studies
- Geography
- History
- Art
- Music
- Dance and Drama
- Physical Education
- PSCHE (Personal, Social Citizenship and Health Education)
- German
- French
- Spanish

=== At Key stage 4 all students study ===
- English
- Mathematics
- Science (Double or Triple)
- French, German or Spanish (exceptions for certain individuals)
- Religious Studies (exceptions for certain individuals)
- PE (compulsory for non GCSE exam students)
- PSCHE (Personal, Social, Citizenship & Health Education)
- Geography or History (Or Both if chosen)

=== Plus two subjects chosen from ===
- Art
- Business Studies
- Computer Science
- Dance
- Drama
- Economics
- Food Preparation and Nutrition
- French
- Geography
- German
- History
- Media Studies
- Music
- Photography
- Physical Education
- Product Design
- Spanish
- Textiles

Selection of GCSE option subjects takes place in Year 9. The Science course leads to double GCSE certification. For English, students have the opportunity to study both English Language and English Literature to GCSE level. ICT and Religious Education can lead to a full or a half GCSE. Languages are chosen in the end of Year 8.

== Notable former pupils ==
=== Mill Hill County High School ===
- Jacob Collier, musician
- Michael Offei, actor
- Tamara Smart, actor
- Ovie Soko, basketball player
- Ben Strevens, footballer
- Martine Wright, sitting volleyball player

=== Orange Hill Grammar School ===
- Matthew Ashman, guitarist with Adam and the Ants
- Sir Bill Callaghan, Chair of the Legal Services Commission
- Gillian Chan, children's author
- Sir Ronald Mourad Cohen, venture capitalist, and Chairman since 2005 of the Portland Trust
- David Dein, former Arsenal FC vice-chairman
- John Ellis, guitarist and songwriter
- Robert Elms, writer and lunchtime broadcaster on BBC London 94.9
- Ian Abrahams, broadcaster talkSPORT
- Frank Jarvis, actor known for The Italian Job
- Daniel Kleinman, music video director, who formed Bazooka Joe (band) with John Ellis which later featured Adam Ant as singer; his TV advertisements include the 1990s Boddingtons ice-cream van with Melanie Sykes, and the 2005 noitulovE for Guinness
- Malcolm McLaren (also known as Malcolm Edwards, and passed three O-levels), Manager of the Sex Pistols
- Stephen Mallatratt, playwright who wrote Island at War (ITV, 2003)
- Kate Parker, Great Britain Olympic hockey player
- Jean Simmons, Hollywood actress
- David Troughton, actor, son of Patrick Troughton
- Michael Troughton, actor, son of Patrick Troughton younger brother of David Troughton

=== Orange Hill Senior High School ===
- Angus Fraser, former England cricketer and Managing Director since 2009 of Middlesex County Cricket Club

== See also ==
- Mill Hill School, nearby independent school
