= Church Farm Industrial School for Boys =

Industrial school in north London, England

Coordinates: 51.635°N 0.156°W

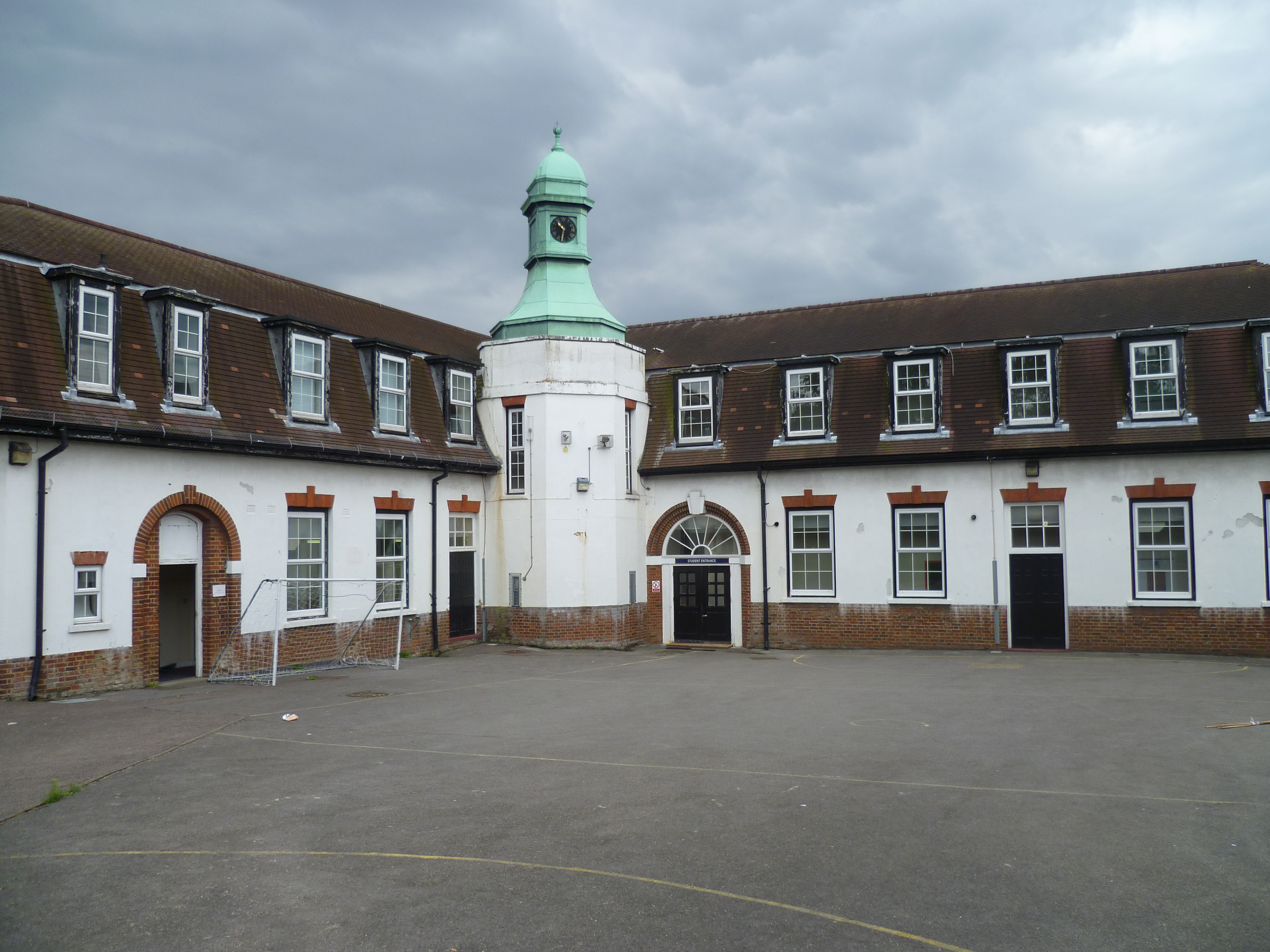
Some of the school buildings

The Church Farm Industrial School for Boys was an industrial school in East Barnet. It was founded by Crimean War veteran and Pre-Raphaelite Brotherhood patron Lt Col William James Gillum in 1860 after buying a farmhouse on part of the estate of Trevor Park for use as a farm branch of Boys' Home Industrial School on Euston Road in Central London. Gillum became the first superintendent and was assisted by his wife Leonora. In 1863 it became a certified industrial school independent of the Euston Road school and began to receive boys committed to it through magistrates courts. In 1933 it became an approved school and moved to Surrey in 1937.

It once provided the choristers for the nearby church. Some of the buildings are now used as the Oakhill Campus of Mill Hill County High School, other parts as a leisure centre and others as housing.

Several buildings in the grounds of the school are listed with Historic England.
