= Henry Crichton =

Henry Crichton may refer to:

- Henry Crichton (cricketer) (1884–1968), English cricketer
- Henry Crichton, 6th Earl Erne (1937–2015), Irish peer and Lord Lieutenant of Fermanagh
