= Napoleon and Josephine: A Love Story =

- Genre: Historical romance
- Screenplay by: James Lee
- Directed by: Richard T. Heffron
- Starring: Armand Assante; Jacqueline Bisset; Stephanie Beacham; Patrick Cassidy; Jane Lapotaire; Anthony Perkins; Ione Skye
- Composers: Gerald Fried; Bill Conti (theme music only)
- Country of origin: United States
- Original language: English
- No. of episodes: 3

Production
- Executive producers: Bernard Sofronski; David L. Wolper
- Producers: Alfred R. Kelman; Suzanne Wiesenfeld
- Cinematography: Jean Tournier
- Editors: Michael Eliot; Scott C. Eyler
- Running time: 285 minutes
- Production companies: David L. Wolper Productions; Warner Bros. Television
- Budget: $20 million

Original release
- Network: ABC
- Release: November 10 – November 12, 1987

Napoleon and Josephine: A Love Story is an American television miniseries broadcast on ABC from November 10 to 12, 1987. It stars Armand Assante as Napoleon Bonaparte and Jacqueline Bisset as Joséphine de Beauharnais, with Stephanie Beacham as Therese Tallien, Patrick Cassidy as Hippolyte Charles, Jane Lapotaire as Letizia Bonaparte, Anthony Perkins as Talleyrand, and Ione Skye as Pauline Bonaparte. It was directed by Richard T. Heffron, based on a screenplay by James Lee.

The plot focuses on the romantic relationship between Napoleon and Josephine from 1794 to 1814, only lightly touching on battles and other historical events. Executive producer David L. Wolper, who had previously created prominent miniseries such as North and South (directed by Heffron) and Roots (written by Lee, among others), stated, "The mini-series covers some of Napoleon's military accomplishments, but only as a backdrop to how the love between these two people affected France, the world and, most importantly, Napoleon and Josephine themselves."

== Cast ==
Actor	Role
Starring
Armand Assante	Napoleon Bonaparte
Jacqueline Bisset	Joséphine de Beauharnais
Stephanie Beacham	Therese Tallien
Anthony Higgins	Joseph Bonaparte
Patrick Cassidy	Capt. Hippolyte Charles
Nickolas Grace	Lord Nelson
Jane Lapotaire	Letizia Bonaparte
Also starring
William Lucking	Sgt. Dupont
Jean-Pierre Stewart	Barras
John Vickery	Bourrienne
Leigh Taylor-Young	Madame de Stael
Introducing
Ione Skye	Pauline Bonaparte
Special guest star
Anthony Perkins	Talleyrand
Featuring
Paul Brooke	Junot
Jeremy Brudenell	Louis Bonaparte
Simon Chandler	Leclerc
Paul Geoffrey	Murat
Julie Graham	Caroline Bonaparte
Jane Gurnett	Elisa Bonaparte

== Filming ==
Napoleon and Josephine was filmed on location in Paris and Morocco, and at studios in Portsmouth. The producers decided to shoot scenes in Paris rather than less expensive locales out of a desire for authenticity. This, and a scheduling disruption when star Bisset missed four days of filming due to illness, caused the budget to grow to $20 million.

== Reception ==
Critical reaction to Napoleon and Josephine was largely negative. Jeff Jarvis of People described the production as a "gooey mess". John J. O'Connor of the New York Times was unimpressed with the leads' performances:

Ms. Bisset is beautiful but she conveys the elegance of a contemporary perfume ad. Her Josephine is not a terribly convincing 18th-century woman of affairs, especially one who reportedly had rotten teeth. And Mr. Assante is exasperating in his determination to overwhelm, whether weeping uncontrollably, barking orders to his troops or having an epileptic fit.

Howard Rosenberg of the Los Angeles Times found Bisset "credible as a sympathetic Josephine" and praised the series' "nice battle sequences", but criticized the script as "heavy on hot-breathed romance, though – offering little sense of history or Napoleon's genius."

Nielsen ratings for the series were disappointing, with its three episodes finishing 15th, 26th, and 30th in their respective time slots.

Napoleon and Josephine received two Emmy nominations – Gerald Fried for Outstanding Achievement in Music Composition, and Michel Fresnay for Outstanding Achievement in Costuming.
