= Michael Troughton =

English actor, teacher and writer (born 1955)

- Born: 2 March 1955 (age 71); Hampstead, London, England
- Education: Open University
- Occupations: Actor, teacher, writer
- Spouses: Caroline Marston (m. 1981; died 2012); Roxana Mohabaty (m. 2019)
- Children: 2
- Parents: Patrick Troughton (father); Margaret Dunlop (mother)
- Relatives: David Troughton (brother); Sam Troughton (nephew); Jim Troughton (nephew); William Troughton (nephew); Harry Melling (nephew)

Michael Troughton (born 2 March 1955) is an English actor, teacher and writer. He is best known for his television roles including Melish in Minder and Sir Piers Fletcher-Dervish in The New Statesman.

== Early life ==
Troughton was born as the son of actor Patrick Troughton and the younger brother of actor David Troughton.

== Career ==
Troughton has appeared in many film, television and theatre roles, most notably as Melish in Minder and Sir Piers Fletcher-Dervish in The New Statesman from 1987 to 1992. Troughton also starred in the first series of Backs to the Land. His more recent roles include senior science master Derek Halliday in the Taggart episode "Out of Bounds", a therapist in the fourth series of Cold Feet, and Mr Mermagen in Enigma.

Troughton obtained a science degree from the Open University. He then taught physics at Sir John Leman school in Beccles for two years, before moving to Woodbridge School to become Head of Drama.

Troughton's biography of his father, Patrick Troughton, published by Hirst Publishing, was launched at the 2011 Dimensions Convention in Newcastle in November 2011. In 2013, he returned to acting, appearing in the ITV series Breathless. He has also completed a number of audio dramatisations for Big Finish.

Troughton appeared in the 2014 Doctor Who Christmas Special Last Christmas as Professor Albert.

Troughton is now an approved Amazon ACX audible producer and works on audio books, voiceovers and narrations from his studio in Suffolk.

== Personal life ==
Troughton married Caroline M. Marston in 1981; they have a son and a daughter. The family moved to Suffolk from London in 1988.

Troughton remarried in 2019 to Roxana Mohabaty.

== Filmography ==
- Doctor Who – Professor Albert (episode "Last Christmas", 2014)
- Breathless (2013) – Mr Truscott
- Holby City – Teddy Sedgwick ("Change of Heart", 2002)
- Micawber – Milton (3 episodes, 2001–2002)
- Cold Feet – Therapist (2 episodes, 2001)
- My Family – Mr. Henshaw ("Ben Wants to Be a Millionaire", 2001)
- High Stakes – Mike Burchett ("The Challenge", 2001)
- Enigma (2001) – Mr. Mermagen
- Lucy Sullivan Is Getting Married (1999–2000) – Ivor (all episodes)
- Casualty – Chris Thomas ("No More Mr Nice Guy", 2000)
- The Mrs Bradley Mysteries – Inspector Starkey ("Speedy Death", 1998)
- Retrace (1996–8) – Dirk French (all episodes)
- Taggart – Derek Halliday ("Out of Bounds", 1998)
- Hetty Wainthropp Investigates – Harry Sholton ("Helping Hansi", 1998)
- Get Well Soon – The Padre (5 episodes, 1997)
- The Heart Surgeon (1997) – Bill Lester
- Woof! – Mr Walters (6 episodes, 1997) / Mr. Ackerman (3 episodes, 1989)
- Poldark (1996) – Duke of Leeds
- My Good Friend – Mr. Moss (Episode #2.1, 1996)
- Silent Witness – Allen Symonds ("Darkness Visible", parts 1 & 2, 1996)
- Is It Legal? – Mr. Arnold ("Dick's House of Horror", 1995)
- Goodnight Sweetheart – George ("Don't Fence Me In", 1995)
- Crown Prosecutor – Colin Molem (Episode #1.8, 1995)
- The Bill – Brian Elliot ("Street Life", 1995)
- The Detectives – Maquess of Tipperary ("Flash", 1995)
- Time Busters – Host (1993–94)
- Sean's Show – Barry Bullsit (8 episodes, 1992–3)
- The New Statesman – Piers Fletcher-Dervish (26 episodes, 1987–92)
- 2point4 children – Mr. Barstow ("The Skeleton in the Cupboard", 1992)
- Bunch of Five – Hedley ("Shall We Gather at the River?", 1992)
- Minder – D.C. Melish (7 episodes, 1984–89)
- The Death of a Heart (1987) – Bursely
- Boon – Martin Turnover ("Fiddler Under the Roof", 1987)
- A Dorothy L. Sayers Mystery – P.C. Ormonde ("Have His Carcase", episodes 1–4, 1987)
- God's Chosen Car Park (1986) – Curtis
- My Brother Jonathan – Arthur Martock (4 episodes, 1985)
- Murder of a Moderate Man – (Episode #1.2, 1985)
- C.A.T.S. Eyes – Detective Inspector ("Love Byte", 1985)
- Morgan's Boy – Vicar (2 episodes, 1984)
- Sorrell and Son – Maurice (3 episodes, 1984)
- Strangers and Brothers – Jack Cotery (2 episodes, 1984)
- Squadron – Flt. Lt. Stather ("Mascot", 1982)
- Take Three Women – Duffy (1982)
- ITV Playhouse – John ("Nightlife", 1982)
- The Barretts of Wimpole Street (1982) – Capt. Surtees Cook
- Bless Me, Father – Father Tom ("Things Are Not What They Seem", 1981)
- We, the Accused – (1 episode, 1980)
- Angels – (3 episodes, 1976–80)
- BBC2 Playhouse – (2 episodes, 1978–80)
- Tales of the Unexpected – (2 episodes, 1979–80)
- Armchair Thriller – Police Constable / Police Sergeant ("Dying Day" Parts 1, 2 & 4, 1980)
- Blake's 7 – Pilot Four-Zero ("Children of Auron", 1980)
- Testament of Youth – Victor Richardson (3 episodes, 1979)
- A Moment in Time (1979) – Tom (all episodes)
- The Deep Concern – Gary Haig (2 episodes, 1979)
- The Mill on the Floss – Bob Jakin (Episode Eight, 1979)
- Graham's Gang – ("Kidnap", 1977)
- Backs to the Land – Eric Whitlow (3 episodes, 1977)
- Fathers and Families – Andrew Matthews ("Ancient Scars", 1977)
- Scene – Rob Rose ("Newsworthy: The Girl Who Saw a Tiger", 1976)
- The Expert – Student ("Fail Safe", 1976)
- David Copperfield – Mick Walker (Episode #1.2, 1974)

=== Audio drama ===
Year	Title		Role	Notes
2013	Doctor Who: The Lost Stories	Lords of the Red Planet	Quendril	
2014	Counter-Measures: Series 3		Ridley / Roderick Purton / Worker 1 / Beresford / German Guard	
2015	Doctor Who: The Novel Adaptations	The Romance of Crime	Menlove Stokes	
2015	Doctor Who: The Novel Adaptations	The Well-Mannered War	Menlove Stokes	
2019	Doctor Who: The Third Doctor Adventures Volume 5	Primord	General Sharp	
2022	Doctor Who: The Third Doctor Adventures	The Annihilators	Second Doctor	
2022	Doctor Who: The Second Doctor Adventures	Beyond War Games	Second Doctor	Takes place past the events of The War Games, acting as Season 6B
2023	Doctor Who: The Audio Novels	The Dead Star	Narrator	
2023	Doctor Who: Once and Future	Past Lives, The Artist at the End of Time, A Genius for War, The Union	Second Doctor	
2023	Doctor Who: The Second Doctor Adventures	James Robert McCrimmon	Second Doctor	
2024	Doctor Who: The Second Doctor Adventures	Conspiracy of Raven	Second Doctor	
2024	Doctor Who: The Lost Stories	Operation Werewolf	Second Doctor	
2024	Doctor Who: The Lost Stories	Deathworld	Second Doctor	Adapted from the original script for The Three Doctors
2024	The Paternoster Gang: Trespassers 3: No Place Like Home	The House Guest	Second Doctor	
2025	Zygon Century: Infiltration	Double Agent	Second Doctor	
2025	Doctor Who: Classic Doctors, New Monsters: Faithful Friends	The Krillitane Feint	Second Doctor	
2025	Doctor Who: The Second Doctor Adventures	The Potential Daleks	Second Doctor	
2026	Doctor Who: The Companion Chronicles: The Legacy of Time		Second Doctor	
2026	Rutans vs Sontarans	Rendition	Second Doctor	
2026	Doctor Who: The Second Doctor Adventures	The Haunted Windmill	Second Doctor	
