= The Town (2012 TV series) =

2012 TV series or program

- Genre: Crime drama; Mystery
- Written by: Mike Bartlett
- Directed by: Colin Teague
- Starring: Andrew Scott; Martin Clunes; Avigail Tlalim; Julia McKenzie; Charlotte Riley; Sam Troughton; Douglas Hodge; Goldy Notay
- Country of origin: United Kingdom
- Original language: English
- No. of seasons: 1
- No. of episodes: 3

Production
- Executive producers: Kenton Allen; Matthew Justice; Simon Curtis
- Producer: Luke Alkin
- Production location: United Kingdom
- Running time: 50 minutes
- Production company: Big Talk Productions

Original release
- Network: ITV
- Release: 5 December – 19 December 2012

The Town is a three-part British television drama series, created by playwright Mike Bartlett, that was first broadcast on ITV on 5 December 2012. The series, which stars Andrew Scott as Mark Nicholas, a young man who returns to his hometown of Renton following the death of both of his parents, was Bartlett's first project for television. The series also stars Martin Clunes as Len Robson, the mayor of Renton; Julia McKenzie as Mark's estranged grandmother, Betty; Avigail Tlalim as Jodie, Mark's rebellious 15-year-old sister; and Charlotte Riley as Alice, Mark's first love.

Filming locations for the series included the high street of High Wycombe, Buckinghamshire; Hughenden Park; The Rye; and High Wycombe railway station. The mayor's office was also located in a Chapel Lane building in High Wycombe. Scott said of his role in the series; "I was anxious to find a project where I could show a little more light and shade. I wouldn't describe my character [Mark] as an everyman; but he's certainly somebody people will recognise. Mark ticked those boxes post-Sherlock as a character, and The Town was a really exciting project for me." The series was released on DVD in Australia, New Zealand and Spain in 2013; but remains unreleased on DVD in the UK.

== Cast ==
- Andrew Scott as Mark Nicholas; a young man who returns to his hometown of Renton following the death of both his parents in a reported suicide pact
- Martin Clunes as Len Robson; the Mayor of Renton who struggles with alcohol problems, exacerbated by the range of public relations problems he is involved with.
- Avigail Tlalim as Jodie Nicholas; Mark's rebellious 15-year-old sister. Jodie's relationship with her brother is strained at first, having never known her brother throughout her life.
- Julia McKenzie as Betty Nicholas; Mark's estranged grandmother, who has occupied his old childhood bedroom in his absence.
- Charlotte Riley as Alice; Mark's first love. Mark's return troubles Alice, who eventually leaves her husband to be with him.
- Douglas Hodge as Inspector Chris Franks; an officer from the local police force who had been having a long-term affair with Mark's mother Kate.
- Gerard Kearns as Daniel; an undertaker who is sacked after dropping Mark's mother's body. He later finds work as a cleaner alongside Betty.
- Callum Turner as Ashley; Jodie's bad boy boyfriend. A troubled teen and reckless boy racer, Ashley is much more complicated than he first appears.
- Goldy Notay as Shireen; the Deputy Mayor of Renton and assistant to Len Robson. She is serious and ambitious, and often struggles to deal with Len's erratic behaviour.
- Sam Troughton as Jeff; an old friend of Mark's.
- Kelly Adams as Lucy; an old friend of Mark's.
- Aisling Bea as Carly; an old friend of Mark's.
- Toby Regbo as Harry; a scholarship pupil who was Jodie's boyfriend.
- Jon Foster as Karl; Alice's husband, with whom she has had a child, Sophie.

== Episodes ==
No.	Title	Directed by	Written by	Original release date	Viewers (millions)
1	"Episode 1"	Colin Teague	Mike Bartlett	5 December 2012	4.68
School-girl Jodie Nicholas is horrified to discover her parents have killed themselves in a suicide pact. This brings Mark, her 30-year old brother, back from London to Renton, where he grew up, to find incompetent trainee undertaker Daniel drop his mother's corpse. He moves into the family home with Jodie and his grandmother Betty, and is persuaded by friends to go to the pub. But feeling alien from them, and having got very drunk, Mark calls on old flame Alice, only to be seen off by her husband Karl. Jodie meanwhile befriends scholarship pupil Harry, and they take a midnight swim together. Len, the town's alcoholic mayor, makes the headlines after starting a fight in a pub to the dismay of Shireen, his deputy, but he does save the day with a superb oration at the funerals. Mark is intrigued to find the words "I Know" on scraps of paper in his parents' room and on their mobile phones.
2	"Episode 2"	Colin Teague	Mike Bartlett	12 December 2012	3.65
Harry asks Jodie to a party where she gets drunk and tries to seduce him, but when he rejects her, she goes off to have sex with the older Ashley. Alice is clearly not as happy as she makes out and ends up having sex with Mark in a hotel room – the same hotel where Betty and sacked undertaker Daniel are working as cleaners. Mark is convinced that his parents' death was not suicide and stays in the town, taking work at the council offices where his mother Kate was employed. Shireen finds a photograph album in Kate's belongings with pictures of her embracing Chris Franks, the police officer who investigated the Nicholas' deaths and, against Len's advice, shows it to Mark. Betty tells Mark that Kate and Chris has a lengthy affair, which made her happy as her marriage was stale – but Mark rushes off to confront the inspector. The next day, Chris has gone missing and Mark is taken in by the police.
3	"Episode 3"	Colin Teague	Mike Bartlett	19 December 2012	Under 2.53
Mark is released by the police, but is sacked from his job. After he is beaten up by two thugs, he gets a call from Jodie to go to the hospital as Betty has collapsed at work. Betty has two other visitors – Chris, who says he believes Tony knew of his wife's affair and killed her; and Daniel, who tells her he had an interest in the family as Tony helped him when he was going off the rails. Mark gives Jodie a birthday tea, over which she tells him that Kate bought flowers every 14 June. He follows this through, discovering that she placed them on the grave of Len's teen-aged son, killed in a hit-and-run. As Len retires from the mayoralty, handing over to Shireen, Mark draws a connection between the hit-and-run and his parents' deaths, finally solving the mystery. Whilst Shireen promises good times for the town, Alice agrees to make a go of things with Mark; whilst Jodie dumps Ashley for Harry.
