= Napoleon (2023 film) =

Film by Ridley Scott

- Theatrical release poster
- Directed by: Ridley Scott
- Written by: David Scarpa
- Produced by: Ridley Scott; Kevin J. Walsh; Mark Huffam; Joaquin Phoenix
- Starring: Joaquin Phoenix; Vanessa Kirby
- Cinematography: Dariusz Wolski
- Edited by: Claire Simpson; Sam Restivo
- Music by: Martin Phipps
- Production companies: Apple Studios; Scott Free Productions
- Distributed by: Sony Pictures Releasing (through Columbia Pictures); Apple Original Films (Note: Split distribution between Sony Pictures Releasing and Apple TV+; Sony only handled the theatrical and VOD release of the theatrical cut, while Apple exclusively handles the SVOD release of both cuts, including Napoleon: The Director's Cut.)
- Release dates: November 14, 2023 (Salle Pleyel); November 22, 2023 (United States and United Kingdom)
- Running time: 157 minutes; 205 minutes (Director's cut)
- Countries: United Kingdom; United States
- Language: English
- Budget: $130–200 million
- Box office: $222.4 million

Napoleon is a 2023 epic historical war film directed and co-produced by Ridley Scott from a screenplay by David Scarpa. Based on the life of Napoleon and primarily depicting his rise to power, as well as his relationship with his wife, Joséphine, it stars Joaquin Phoenix as Napoleon and Vanessa Kirby as Joséphine.

In October 2020, Scott announced Napoleon as his next project. Following delays and recastings due to the COVID-19 pandemic, filming began in February 2022 in England, lasting several months. In addition to writer David Scarpa, frequent Scott collaborators included cinematographer Dariusz Wolski and editor Claire Simpson.

Napoleon premiered at Salle Pleyel in Paris on November 14, 2023, and was released in the United States and United Kingdom on November 22 by Columbia Pictures (via Sony Pictures Releasing) before streaming on Apple TV+ on March 1, 2024. The film grossed $222.4 million worldwide, becoming a box office disappointment though it performed slightly better overseas, and received mixed reviews from critics, who praised the battle sequences and performances but criticized its tone, pacing, and historical inaccuracies. At the 96th Academy Awards, the film received nominations for Best Production Design, Best Costume Design, and Best Visual Effects.

== Plot ==
In 1793, amid the French Revolution, young army officer Napoleon Bonaparte watches Marie Antoinette beheaded by the guillotine. Later that year, Revolutionary leader Paul Barras has Napoleon manage the Siege of Toulon; he storms the enemy fort and repels the British ships with artillery. After Maximilien Robespierre is deposed and executed at the end of the Reign of Terror, French leaders, including Napoleon, attempt to restore stability. Again employing artillery, Napoleon suppresses the royalist insurrection on 13 Vendémiaire in 1795.

Napoleon woos aristocratic widow Joséphine de Beauharnais and the two eventually marry. Despite their vigorous sex life, they bear no children. In Egypt, he prevails again at the Battle of the Pyramids in 1798, but rushes home when he hears Joséphine has an almost 10-year younger lover, Hippolyte Charles. The Directory criticises him for abandoning his troops, but he condemns them for their poor leadership of France and with several collaborators such as Talleyrand, Fouché, Sieyès and Ducos, overthrows them in the Coup of 18 Brumaire and becomes First Consul.

Napoleon is crowned Emperor of the French by the pope in 1804, during which he audaciously puts the crown on his own head. Foreign Minister Talleyrand suggests to Austria an alliance, though the Austrians dismiss the idea. A year later, Napoleon outmanoeuvres and defeats the Austrians and the Russians at the Battle of Austerlitz, forcing them to retreat over frozen lakes before bombarding the ice and drowning them. Afterwards, he invites Austrian Emperor Francis II for wine—which Russian Tsar Alexander I declines to attend—and tells Francis that since he did not totally destroy their armies, he expects the latter to be grateful.

Napoleon's mother has him impregnate a mistress, proving that Joséphine is infertile. He divorces her in 1810, publicly slapping her in the face when she initially refuses to read her portion of the decree, but the two remain on good terms and continue exchanging friendly letters. Napoleon marries Marie Louise of Austria, who bears a son one year later.

In 1812, Napoleon invades Russia after Alexander reneges on the Treaties of Tilsit. He prevails, despite bloody guerrilla resistance by Don Cossacks, and then fighting the huge Battle of Borodino, but finds Moscow empty and later set aflame. Napoleon retreats during the winter to France, having lost about half a million men. In 1814, the Coalition forces Napoleon's abdication and exiles him to Elba.

In 1815, upon hearing that Joséphine is unwell, Napoleon escapes the island and in the Hundred Days returns to power in France. She, having been forced into reclusion at the Château de Malmaison, dies before he arrives. King Louis XVIII sends the Fifth Regiment to stop Napoleon, but he charms them into joining him.

At the Battle of Waterloo in June, Napoleon, having amassed more troops, confronts the British army under Arthur Wellesley, Duke of Wellington. French cavalry charges are repulsed by British infantry squares, and a desperate Napoleon urges his remaining soldiers forward, but this advance is defeated by re-formed lines of enemy infantry. The forces of Prussian Marshal Blücher arrive to reinforce Wellesley, and the French are broken. As Napoleon retreats, he salutes Wellesley.

Napoleon is exiled, this time to the island of Saint Helena in the middle of the Atlantic Ocean, and is seen bantering with children, writing his memoirs that would become read all over the world and presenting to his listeners a version of history where he is always right. An unwell Napoleon collapses, hearing Joséphine beckon him to meet her again. Napoleon dies in 1821. An epilogue notes that roughly 3 million people died in his wars.

== Cast ==
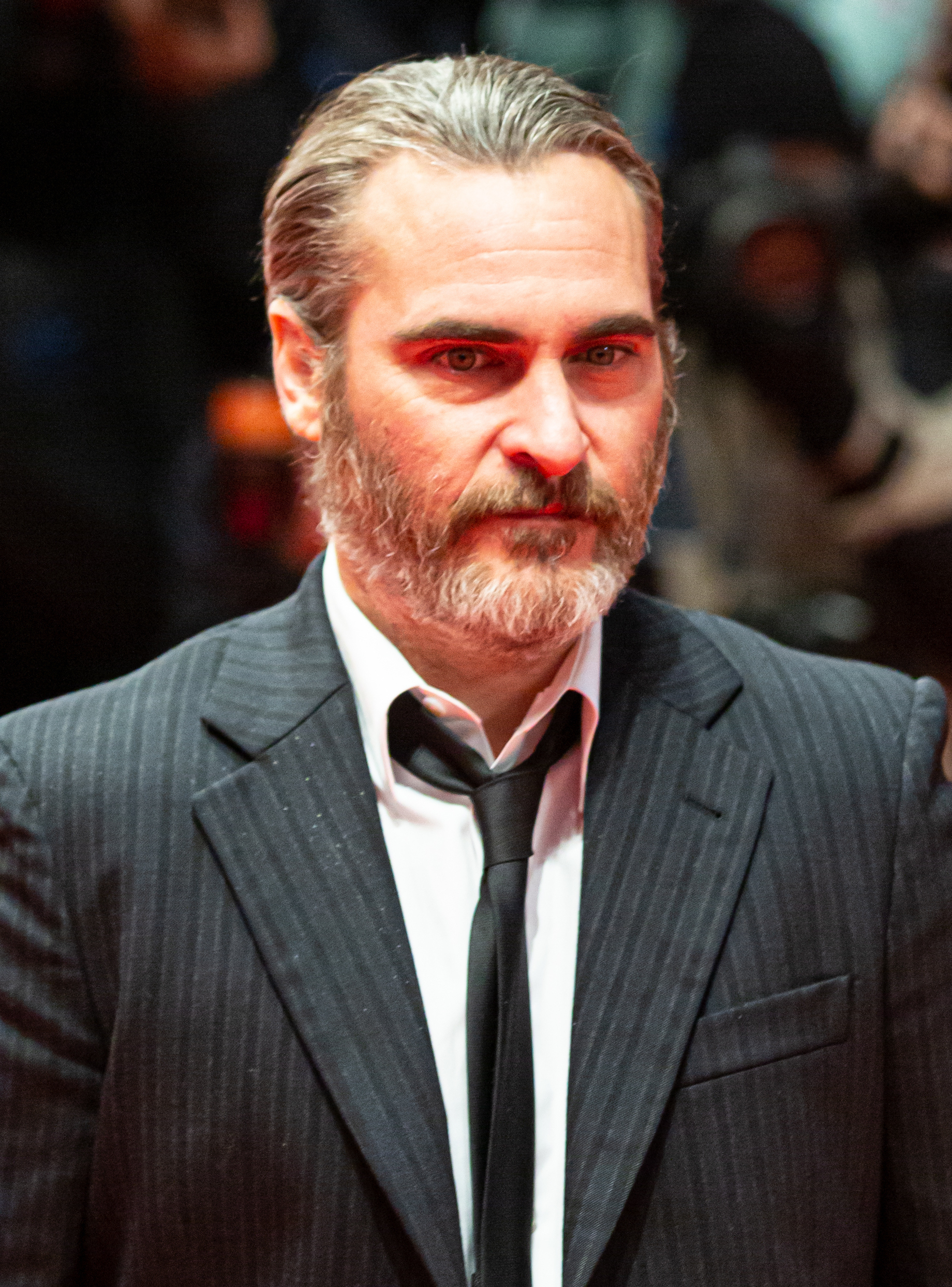
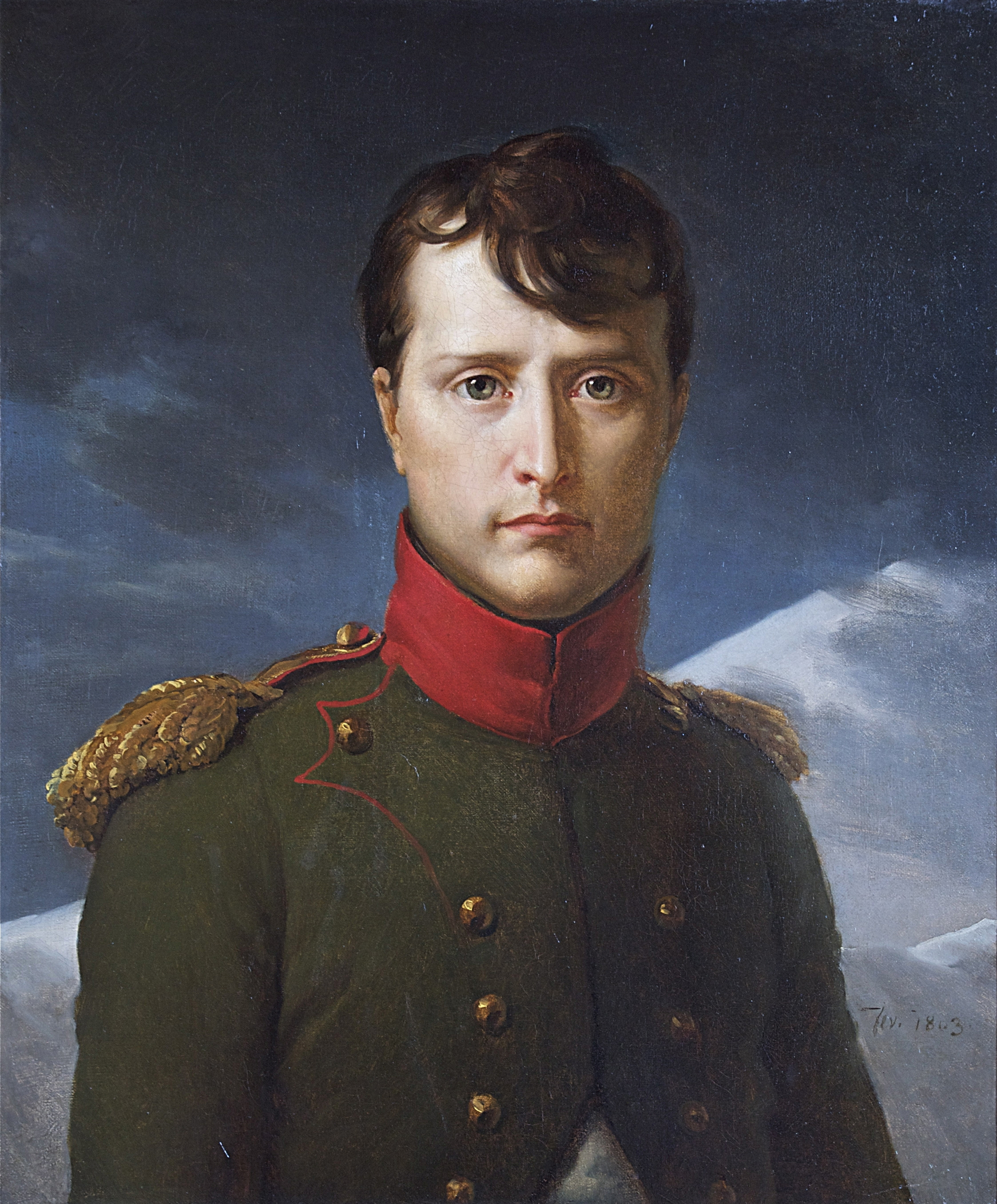
Joaquin Phoenix (left) portrays Napoleon.
- Joaquin Phoenix as Napoleon Bonaparte, Emperor of the French.
- Vanessa Kirby as Empress Joséphine, Empress Consort and the first wife of Napoleon.
- Tahar Rahim as Paul Barras, a politician who was the executive head of the Directory during the French Revolution.
- Rupert Everett as Arthur Wellesley, Duke of Wellington.
- Ben Miles as Armand de Caulaincourt, a diplomat and close advisor to Napoleon.
- Ludivine Sagnier as Thérésa Cabarrus (Madame Tallien), a socialite and noblewoman.
- Matthew Needham as Lucien Bonaparte, brother of Napoleon.
- John Hollingworth as Michel Ney, lauded as "the bravest of the brave" by Napoleon.
- Youssef Kerkour as Louis-Nicolas Davout, one of Napoleon's finest commanders.
- Sinéad Cusack as Letizia Bonaparte, mother of Napoleon.
- Julian Rhind-Tutt as Abbé Sieyès.
- Phil Cornwell as Sanson the Bourreau, the executioner who guillotined Louis XVI, the King of France.
- Édouard Philipponnat as Alexander I, Tsar of Russia.
- Jannis Niewöhner as Hippolyte Charles.
- Miles Jupp as Francis II, Emperor of Austria.
- Edward Bennett as Jean de Cambaceres, a Royalist supporter.
- Ian McNeice as Louis XVIII, King of France during the Bourbon Restoration, following Napoleon's exile to Elba.
- Paul Rhys as Talleyrand, a leading diplomat of France.
- Catherine Walker as Marie-Antoinette, Archduchess of Austria, and later Queen of France.
- Gavin Spokes as Moulin, a Directory politician.
- Mark Bonnar as Jean-Andoche Junot, general of Napoleon and commander of the French invasion of Portugal in 1807.
- Anna Mawn as the Archduchess Marie-Louise, Napoleon's second wife.
- Davide Tucci as Lazare Hoche, a general and hero of revolutionary France.
- Sam Crane as Jacques-Louis David, a preeminent Neoclassical French painter.
- Scott Handy as Marshal Louis-Alexandre Berthier, chief of staff to Napoleon from his first Italian campaign in 1796 until his first abdication in 1814, and twice Minister of War of France.
- Tim Faulkner as Gebhard Leberecht von Blücher.
- Abubakar Salim as General Thomas-Alexandre Dumas.
- Kevin Eldon as Dr. Jean-Nicolas Corvisart.
- Sam Troughton as Maximilien Robespierre.
- Robin Soans as Pope Pius VII.

== Production ==
=== Development ===
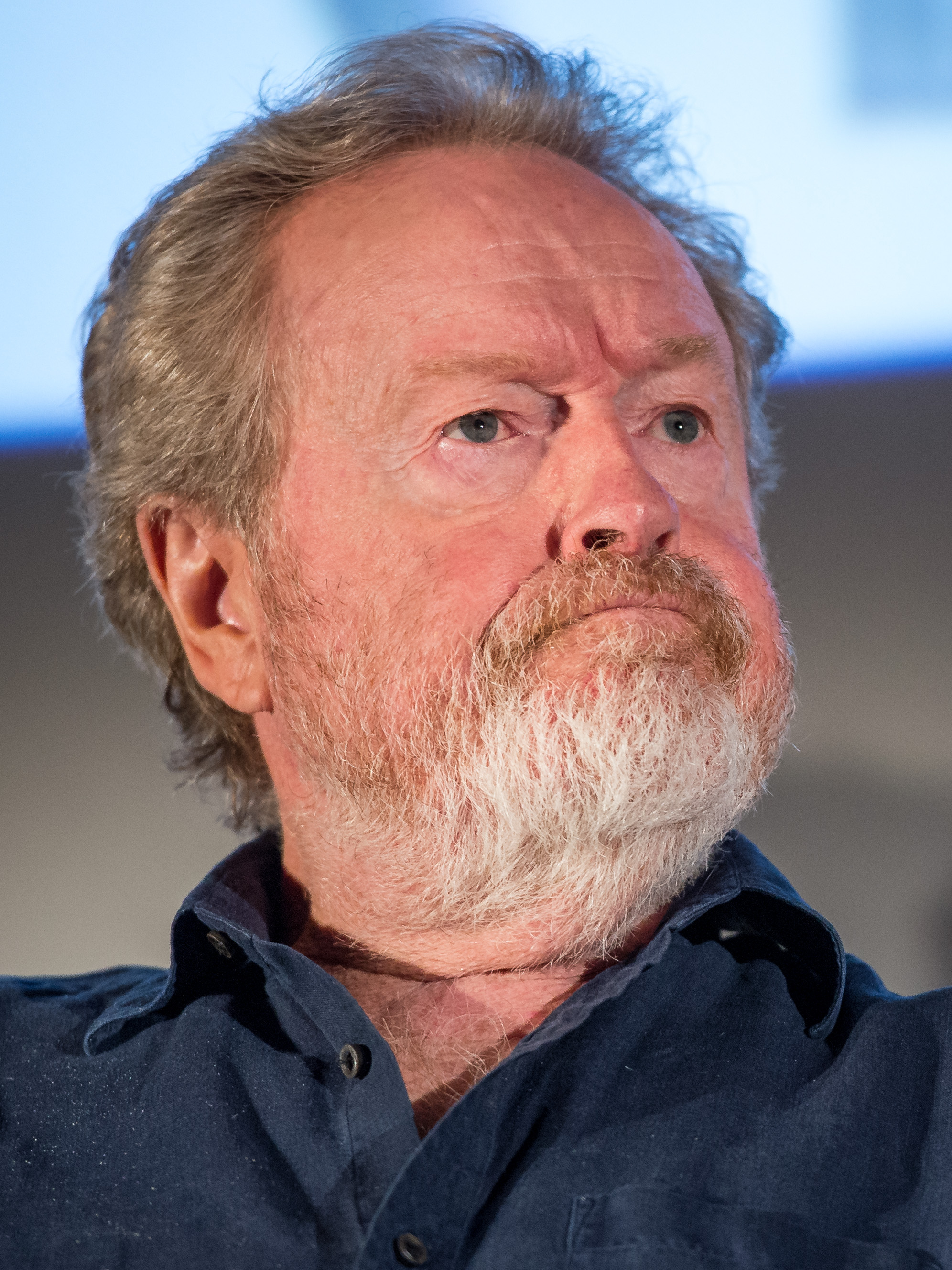
Director Scott in 2015

On October 14, 2020, the same day his film The Last Duel (2021) wrapped filming, Ridley Scott announced Napoleon, at that point provisionally called Kitbag, as his next project for 20th Century Studios, based on Napoleon's life. He would direct and produce, while the screenplay was written by Scott's All the Money in the World (2017) collaborator David Scarpa. The film's working title was derived from the saying that "There is a general's staff hidden in every soldier's kitbag". During the same year, Scott also consulted with University of Oxford scholar Michael Broers regarding Napoleon's life, particularly collaborating with him in deconstructing the geography of the Battle of Waterloo. He also received Stanley Kubrick's script for his planned Napoleon film, which never materialized. By January 2021, Apple Studios announced its commitment to finance and produce the film, with filming scheduled to begin in the United Kingdom in 2022.

=== Writing ===
Scarpa had been approached by Scott to write a film based on Napoleon following production of All the Money in the World. As he initially had a "high school basic knowledge" of his life, he researched Napoleon and after realizing that writing a film encompassing his entire life was impractical, he decided to focus on Napoleon's relationship with his wife, Josephine. He began by reading Napoleon: A Concise Biography by David A. Bell, but did not understand it, read more books and watched YouTube videos. When researching Josephine, he cited Ambition and Desire: The Dangerous Life of Josephine Bonaparte by Kate Williams as his primary influence. He took inspiration from Scott's The Duellists (1977) and Milos Forman's Amadeus (1984), wanting to portray Napoleon as an "irreverent" figure similar to how Mozart was depicted in Amadeus, and told Scott he envisioned Napoleon as being competent "in the realm of battle", and "incompetent in the realm of love". Scott proposed the idea of beginning the film with Marie Antoinette being under the guillotine, wanting to focus on the "ambivalence about where democracy leads". Scott's writing process also involved hand-drawing storyboards, with him sending Scarpa the illustrations once Scarpa sent him pages from the script.

In August 2024, it was reported that Phoenix had threatened to leave the film unless Paul Thomas Anderson (with whom Phoenix previously worked on The Master and Inherent Vice) was recruited to rewrite the script. Eventually, the situation calmed down and Phoenix remained involved in the production. Later that year, Scott confirmed that Anderson had indeed been brought in for rewrites, saying: "It turned into a lot of fun, actually. Three of us in this room screaming with laughter." Anderson confirmed his involvement with the script rewrites in September 2025.

=== Casting ===
Joaquin Phoenix was reportedly attached to star as the French general and emperor Napoléon, reuniting him with the director after Gladiator (2000). Scott had Phoenix and another actor in mind to play Napoléon, but felt "blown away" by Phoenix's performance as the titular character in Joker (2019) and, despite disliking how that film apparently celebrated violence, concluded that Phoenix could be an "amazing asset" for Napoleon, both creatively and commercially.

The Last Duel actress Jodie Comer was reportedly Scott's first choice to play Joséphine. She entered negotiations to star in March 2021, confirmed her casting in September, and said: "I just jumped at the chance to work with Ridley and his team again and the idea of working with Joaquin, who's someone who I hugely admire... I'm so excited to delve into that world." In November, she said her role was "going to be another huge challenge, but what I love about period dramas is that kind of transformation. Even now, doing some costume and hair tests for Kitbag, it's just so exciting because it becomes so much easier to step out of yourself and into somebody else." The same month, Youssef Kerkour was confirmed to star. On January 4, 2022, Comer revealed her departure from the film due to scheduling changes caused by the COVID-19 pandemic and described the situation as "rubbish". Vanessa Kirby was announced as her replacement later that day. On January 18, 2022, producer Kevin J. Walsh said the film had been retitled Napoleon. In February, Tahar Rahim was added to the cast, in the role of Paul Barras. The historian Lorris Chevalier, who worked on The Last Duel, became the historical advisor.

=== Filming ===
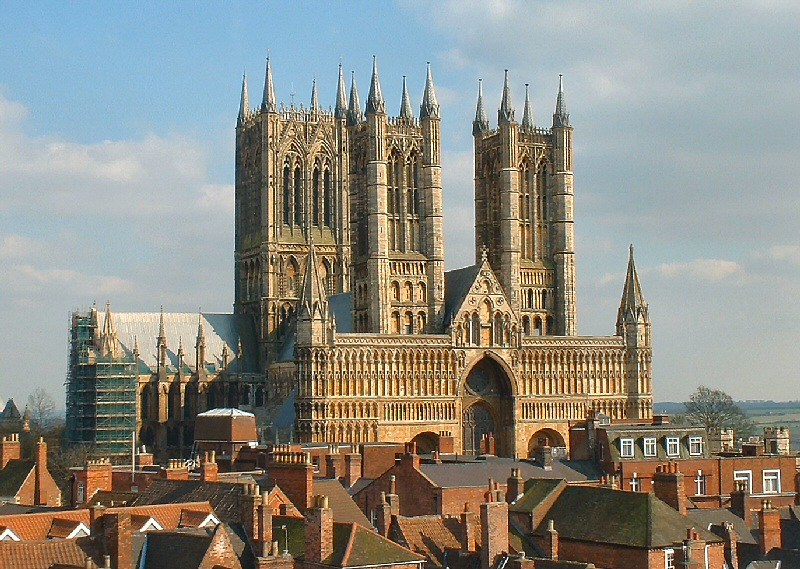
Initial filming took place at Lincoln Cathedral.

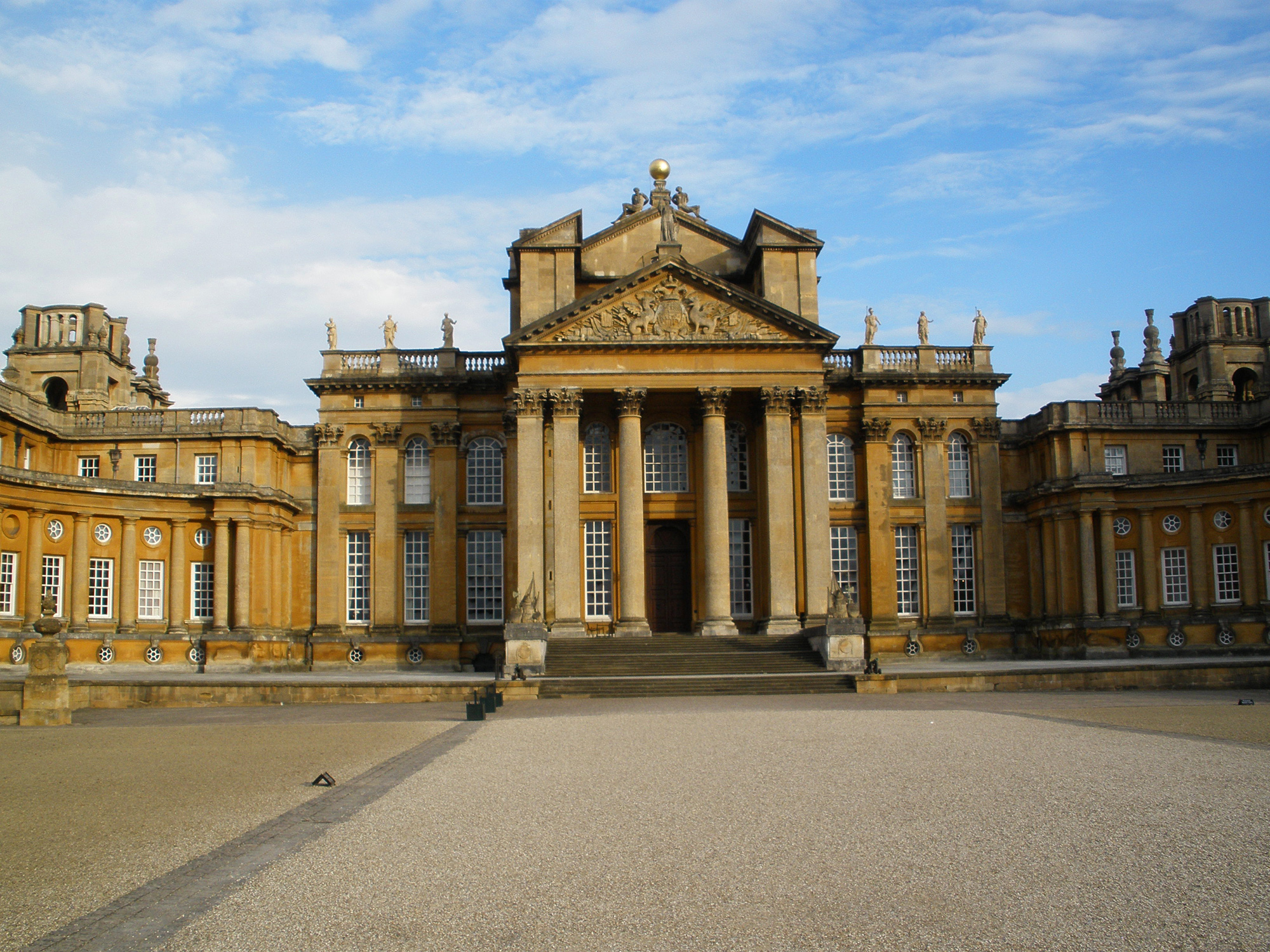
Some battle scenes and romantic scenes were filmed at Blenheim Palace.

Production began in February 2022. The film features six major battle sequences, unlike Waterloo (1970), another film featuring Napoleon, that focused on a single battle. The battles featured in the film are the siege of Toulon, Battle of the Pyramids, Battle of Marengo, Battle of Austerlitz, Battle of Borodino, and Battle of Waterloo. The Battle of Marengo sequence was removed from the theatrical cut but was retained in the director's cut.

Napoleon was shot under the working title Marengo, a reference to the Battle of Marengo (1800). Filming took place in Lincoln, England in March 2022. The crew reportedly spent a week to prepare Lincoln Cathedral, which stood in for Notre-Dame de Paris. Shooting took place in the cathedral on March 17 and 18, between 7 am to 7 pm.

Filming also took place at other English locations: Stowe House, Buckinghamshire; West Wycombe Park, Buckinghamshire; Blenheim Palace, Oxfordshire; Petworth House, West Sussex; Boughton House, Northamptonshire; and the Old Royal Naval College, Greenwich, London. The execution of Marie Antoinette was filmed at Somerset House in London. Underwater scenes were filmed at Pinewood Studios.

It was also shot in Malta for three weeks, starting in May 2022. Fort Ricasoli in Kalkara was transformed into the site of 1793's siege of Toulon, where Napoleon had his first victory. The desert in the area of Merzouga in Morocco stood in for Egypt. Youssef Louchi served as unit manager on the production. The film was shot in just 62 days.

== Release ==
Napoleon premiered at Salle Pleyel in Paris on November 14, 2023. For the film's theatrical release, Apple Original Films partnered with Sony Pictures Releasing, under their Columbia Pictures banner, to help exhibit the film worldwide. It was released in cinemas first in the United States and the United Kingdom on November 22, 2023. In August 2023, Ridley Scott revealed that he had planned a director's cut of Napoleon that explored more of Empress Joséphine, and hoped that he would be able to release it in theaters and on Apple TV+, after the initial theatrical release. Scott indicated that the director's cut would run four hours and ten minutes.

=== Home media ===
Napoleon was released on digital platforms on January 9, 2024, before streaming on March 1, 2024 on Apple TV+. On August 29, 2024, the director's cut was released on streaming with an additional 48 minutes of footage.

== Reception ==
=== Box office ===
Napoleon grossed $61.5 million in the United States and Canada, and $160.9 million in other territories, for a worldwide total of $222.4 million. In February 2024, Deadline Hollywood reported that this gross fell short of covering the film's marketing budget, with revenues falling about $16 million behind. This shortfall was made up by home rentals, but according to the publication that still left an estimated loss of around $165 million, equivalent to the production budget, for Apple. In contrast, Apple insisted the film was profitable.

In the United States and Canada, Napoleon was released alongside Wish and the wide expansion of Saltburn, and was originally projected to gross around $22 million from 3,500 theaters over its five-day Thanksgiving opening weekend. After making $7.7 million on its first day (including $3 million from Tuesday night previews), estimates were raised to $29–33 million. It made $4.4 million on Thanksgiving Day and $8.4 million on Friday. The film went on to debut to $20.4 million in its opening weekend (and a total of $32.5 million over the five days), finishing second behind holdover The Hunger Games: The Ballad of Songbirds & Snakes. It fell 65% in its second weekend to sixth place, grossing $7.1 million.

Rebecca Rubin of Variety noted that under a traditional theatrical release, the film would need to gross $500–600 million worldwide in order to break-even given its $200 million budget. However, the success of the film could not be based solely on the box office, and would hinge on subscribers driven to Apple TV+ and "on-demand rentals and other revenue streams that wouldn't have been possible by going directly to streaming". Stephen Galloway, dean of Chapman University's film school, stated: "Apple making a $200 million movie is like you buying a cup of coffee and spilling it, but it's not making their brand look good if films like Killers of the Flower Moon and Napoleon underperform at the box office."

=== Critical response ===
On the review aggregator website Rotten Tomatoes, 58% of 342 critics' reviews are positive, with an average rating of 6.2/10. The website's consensus reads: "Ridley Scott is intent on proving the emperor has no clothes in Napoleon, a slyly funny epic with bravura set pieces and a divided runtime that keeps it from outright conquering." Metacritic, which uses a weighted average, assigned the film a score of 64 out of 100, based on 62 critics, indicating "generally favorable" reviews. Audiences polled by CinemaScore gave the film an average grade of "B−" on an A+ to F scale, while those polled by PostTrak gave it a 72% overall positive score, with 46% saying they would definitely recommend the film.

Critics praised the film's epic scale, battle scenes, and Phoenix and Kirby's performances, while some took issue with the length and Scott's "bloated" direction. French critics had a less enthusiastic view than those from Britain and America, considering Napoleon "lazy, pointless, boring, migraine-inducing, too short and historically inaccurate". A review in Le Figaro stated that the film could have been called "Barbie and Ken under the Empire", and another in the French edition of GQ deemed it to be "deeply clumsy, unnatural and unintentionally funny". Patrice Gueniffey, a leading historian in Napoleonic studies, called the movie "anti-French and very pro-British" in an interview to Le Point.

Kyle Smith of The Wall Street Journal stated that "Mr. Phoenix's Napoleon could never have commanded so much as a squadron of the Salvation Army, and though the movie is sprinkled with a few reasonably hearty battle scenes, overall it's something like Mr. Scott's Waterloo." In a one-and-a-half out of four review, Odie Henderson of Boston Globe said, "It relies far too often on the "little man, big temper" idea of Napoleon — at times, Phoenix is practically channeling an angry Donald Duck mid-meltdown — and the scenes between the two lovers make them seem more like robots emulating human beings." Writing in The Guardian, Peter Bradshaw gave the film a full five stars and called it a "thrilling biopic", concluding that Scott "doesn't withhold the old-fashioned pleasures of spectacle and excitement. Phoenix is the key to it all: a performance as robust as the glass of burgundy he knocks back: preening, brooding, seething and triumphing." Writing in The Observer, Wendy Ide gave it three out of five, calling it a "sturdy epic" that struggled to "show us what drove the military mastermind". She continued, "A man, even a man as combative as Napoleon, amounts to more than the battles he has fought. And it is in this respect that the film is less successful." The BBC's Nicholas Barber found the film's battle sequences "spectacular", and also praised the performances of Kirby and Phoenix. Johnny Oleksinski of the New York Post wrote: "[...] it's too bad Scott could not deliver a brilliant character study of one of the world's great military leaders — and instead settled for letting a self-indulgent Phoenix fly over the cuckoo's nest". Time Out's Phil de Semylen gave the film three out of five, writing that "Ridley Scott's beefy account of Napoleon's rise to power looks great, is served with some panache, but crucially lacks flavour."

=== Accolades ===
Accolades received by Napoleon
Award	Date of ceremony	Category	Recipient(s)	Result	Ref.
Academy Awards	March 10, 2024	Best Costume Design	Janty Yates and Dave Crossman	Nominated	
Academy Awards	March 10, 2024	Best Production Design	Production Design: Arthur Max; Set Decoration: Elli Griff	Nominated	
Academy Awards	March 10, 2024	Best Visual Effects	Charley Henley, Luc-Ewen Martin-Fenouillet, Simone Coco and Neil Corbould	Nominated	
AACTA International Awards	February 10, 2024	Best Supporting Actress	Vanessa Kirby	Won	
ADG Excellence in Production Design Awards	February 10, 2024	Excellence in Production Design for a Period Film	Arthur Max	Nominated	
British Academy Film Awards	February 18, 2024	Best Costume Design	David Crossman and Janty Yates	Nominated	
British Academy Film Awards	February 18, 2024	Best Make Up & Hair	Jana Carboni, Francesco Pegoretti, Satinder Chumber and Julia Vernon	Nominated	
British Academy Film Awards	February 18, 2024	Best Special Visual Effects	Henry Badgett, Neil Corbould, Charley Henley and Luc-Ewen Martin-Fenouillet	Nominated	
British Academy Film Awards	February 18, 2024	Outstanding British Film	Ridley Scott, Mark Huffam, Kevin J. Walsh and David Scarpa	Nominated	
Camerimage	November 18, 2023	Golden Frog	Dariusz Wolski	Nominated	
Critics' Choice Movie Awards	January 14, 2024	Best Costume Design	Janty Yates, David Crossman	Nominated	
Costume Designers Guild Awards	February 21, 2024	Excellence in Period Film	Janty Yates and Dave Crossman	Nominated	
Golden Reel Awards	March 3, 2024	Outstanding Achievement in Sound Editing – Feature Dialogue / ADR	Oliver Tarney, James Harrison, Michael Maroussas, Rachael Tate	Nominated	
Golden Reel Awards	March 3, 2024	Outstanding Achievement in Sound Editing – Feature Effects / Foley	Oliver Tarney, James Harrison, Mike Fentum, Hugo Adams, Aran Clifford, Kevin Penney, Rowan Watson, Oliver Ferris, Sue Harding	Nominated	
Las Vegas Film Critics Society	December 13, 2023	Best Cinematography	Dariusz Wolski	Nominated	
Las Vegas Film Critics Society	December 13, 2023	Best Costumes	Janty Yates, David Crossman	Nominated	
North Texas Film Critics Association	December 18, 2023	Best Cinematography	Dariusz Wolski	Nominated	
San Diego Film Critics Society	December 19, 2023	Best Cinematography	Dariusz Wolski	Nominated	
San Diego Film Critics Society	December 19, 2023	Best Production Design	Arthur Max	Nominated	
San Diego Film Critics Society	December 19, 2023	Best Costume Design	David Crossman, Janty Yates	Nominated	
San Diego Film Critics Society	December 19, 2023	Best Stunt Choreography	Napoleon	Nominated	
Satellite Awards	March 3, 2024	Best Cinematography	Dariusz Wolski	Nominated	
Satellite Awards	March 3, 2024	Best Sound (Editing and Mixing)	Napoleon	Nominated	
Satellite Awards	March 3, 2024	Best Visual Effects	Napoleon	Nominated	
Satellite Awards	March 3, 2024	Best Production Design	Arthur Max	Nominated	
Satellite Awards	March 3, 2024	Best Costume Design	David Crossman, Janty Yates	Won	
Seattle Film Critics Society Awards	January 8, 2024	Best Costume Design	David Crossman, Janty Yates	Nominated	
Set Decorators Society of America Awards	February 13, 2024	Best Achievement in Décor/Design of a Period Feature Film	Elli Griff and Arthur Max	Nominated	
Visual Effects Society Awards	February 21, 2024	Outstanding Supporting Visual Effects in a Photoreal Feature	Charley Henley, Sarah Tulloch, Luc-Ewen Martin-Fenouillet, Simone Coco, Neil Corbould	Nominated	
Visual Effects Society Awards	February 21, 2024	Outstanding Effects Simulations in a Photoreal Feature	Koen Hofmeester, Gianmichele Mariani, Clair Bellens, Hernan Llano Duque	Nominated	

== Historical accuracy ==
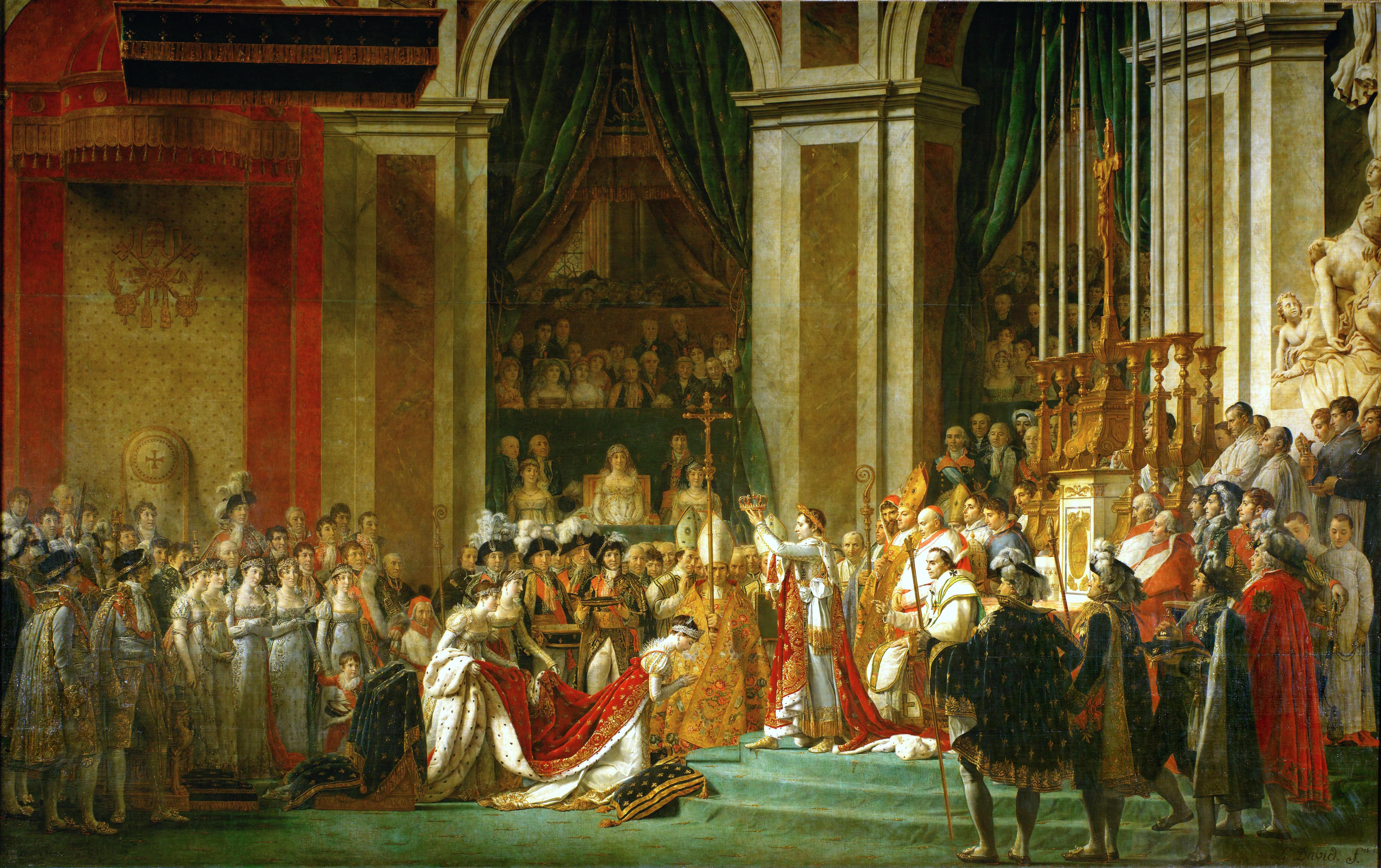
The film's coronation scene is portrayed as it was depicted in the famous painting The Coronation of Napoleon by Jacques-Louis David.

Many critics of the film's historical aspects, including historians Adam Tooze and Andrew Roberts, believed it ignored Napoleon's numerous non-military achievements, as well as his popularity with the French people. Roberts, a Napoleon biographer, said his portrayal as a proto-Hitler was "as tired as it is absurd". Historian Zack White agreed, arguing the film "swallowed old British propaganda" which depicted Napoleon as a "Corsican ruffian". Ellin Stein, writing for Slate, pointed out that Napoleon was known for his passion for literature and Enlightenment thought – a far cry from the boorish, loutish soldier that Scott depicts. French historian Patrice Gueniffey called the movie "anti-French" and full of historical inaccuracies, while fellow historian Romain Marsily found the portrayal of Napoleon "lackluster" and “mediocre” while disregarding Napoleon's positive legacies such as the Napoleonic Code. Spanish historian Francisco Gracia Alonso called the film "a crime". Historian Joan Tumblety wrote that the movie ignored French atrocities such as those committed after the Siege of Jaffa.

Napoleon did not attend the execution of Marie Antoinette, as he was commanding forces at Toulon at the time. The film additionally depicts a defeated Napoleon meeting Wellington, whereas in actuality, the two men never met. Oxford historian Michael Broers, who worked on the movie, noted several inaccuracies in Napoleon and Josephine's relationship, including the timing of their divorce (1809, not 1807), its nature (Napoleon did not slap Josephine during their divorce), and its rationale (Josephine is portrayed as accepting the inevitability of the divorce, whereas in reality, she was fearful of it). The historical Joséphine died in May 1814, a few weeks after Napoleon's exile to Elba, rather than a year later during the Hundred Days as depicted in the film. Therefore, her illness or death was not a direct factor in Napoleon's escape and return to France.

The film presents Napoleon as firing on the Pyramids of Giza, which never happened. Cairo Egyptologist Salima Ikram pointed out that Napoleon held the Sphinx and the pyramids in high esteem and used them as motivation for his troops. "He definitely did not take pot shots at them." In an interview with The Times, Scott defended his depiction of the attack on the pyramids as being "a fast way of saying [Napoleon] took Egypt".

Major events of Napoleon's reign such as the Peninsular War, the Saint-Domingue expedition, the Haitian Revolution, the Austrian campaign of 1809 and the campaigns of 1813 and 1814 are entirely omitted. The depiction of the Battle of Waterloo silences the roles of Dutch and German armies. Napoleon's marshals, who played a key role in his campaigns, are almost entirely absent. The film was criticized for ignoring Napoleon's decision to reinstate slavery in France's overseas colonies in 1802 after it had been abolished by the National Convention following the French Revolution.

Historian Paul du Quenoy criticized the depiction of Napoleonic era battlefield tactics, especially the Austerlitz sequence, "one of the few battles that the film depicts in detail". He noted that historians consider the ambush on the ice to be a myth of the Austerlitz campaign, "a minor detail whose significance has been doubted almost since the time of the battle". Napoleon, an artillery officer by training, never personally led a cavalry charge, as is shown at Borodino and Waterloo. Franz-Stefan Gady, writing for Foreign Policy, described the battle sequences as "a Hollywood mishmash of medieval melees, meaningless cannonades, and World War I-style infantry advances". "For all of Scott’s fixation on Napoleon’s battles, he seems curiously disinterested in how the real Napoleon fought them."

Scott dismissed criticisms of these historical inaccuracies, saying, "Napoleon dies then, ten years later, someone writes a book. Then someone takes that book and writes another, and so, 400 [sic] years later, there's a lot of imagination [in history books]. When I have issues with historians, I ask: 'Excuse me, mate, were you there? No? Well, shut the f*** up then.' " Scott also declared, responding to French critics, that "the French don't even like themselves".

== See also ==
- Cultural depictions of Napoleon
