= David Troughton =

English actor (born 1950)

- Born: 9 June 1950 (age 76); Hampstead, London, England
- Occupation: Actor
- Years active: 1963–present
- Children: Sam; Jim; William
- Father: Patrick Troughton
- Relatives: Michael Troughton (brother); Harry Melling (nephew)

David Troughton (born 9 June 1950) is an English actor. He is known for his Shakespearean roles on the British stage and for his many roles on British television, including Dr Bob Buzzard in A Very Peculiar Practice and Ricky Hanson in New Tricks.

== Early life and family ==
David Troughton was born in Hampstead, London. He comes from an acting family. He is the son of Patrick Troughton and Margaret Dunlop, elder brother of Michael Troughton, and father of actors Sam Troughton and William Troughton. He attended Orange Hill Grammar School in Edgware with his brother Michael. Another son is the Warwickshire cricketer Jim Troughton. Troughton is also an uncle of the actor Harry Melling.

== Career ==
His memorable performances include King Richard in Richard III (RSC, 1996), Bolingbroke in Richard II (RSC, 2000) and Duke Vincentio in Measure for Measure (Théâtre de Complicité, 2004).

On television, his roles have included Ham Peggotty in David Copperfield; guest appearances in Survivors, The Life and Times of David Lloyd George, Rab C. Nesbitt, and Doctor Who, first as an extra in The Enemy of the World (1967–1968), then as a soldier in The War Games (1969), both times alongside his father who played the Second Doctor, and in a considerably larger role as King Peladon in The Curse of Peladon (1972) alongside Jon Pertwee as the Third Doctor; as Doc Pitman in Warship; as Sergeant Pritchard in the BBC television sitcom Hi-de-Hi! series 2 episode 12 and as Brinsley in the episode "Sons and Lovers" in Sorry!. In the television adaptation of Alan Ayckbourn's trilogy The Norman Conquests (1977), Troughton appeared as Tom, the veterinarian. During 1977/8 he starred as Royal Flying Corps Observer Lieutenant Richard Bravington in two seasons of the television series Wings. Later he was the physician Bob Buzzard in the two series of A Very Peculiar Practice (1986 and 1988).

Also in 1986, he appeared as himself in the ITV children's TV show Rainbow, appearing as the guest storyteller in the episode "What's Wrong with Bungle". He was Uncle Sid in Cider with Rosie (1998) and also appeared in the role of Sir Arthur Wellesley (the Duke of Wellington) in the first two episodes of Sharpe, a role which saw him share the screen once again with former Wings co-star Michael Cochrane who played Sir Henry Simmerson. He appeared as an alien hunter in the comedy/drama mini-series Ted and Alice in 2002, and in 2005 he also played Sgt. Clive Harvey, side-kick to the title character of the ITV detective show Jericho. He appeared in an episode of Agatha Christie's Poirot in 1993 ("The Yellow Iris"), and in two separate episodes of Midsomer Murders, in 1998 and 2007, playing two separate characters. He appeared in the first episode of the TV adaptation of The Last Detective in which his A Very Peculiar Practice co-star Peter Davison (also ex-Doctor Who) starred.

Troughton appeared in the TV film All the King's Men, playing King George V.

He appeared in the 2008 series of Doctor Who as Professor Hobbes, in the episode "Midnight". He has also performed in a Big Finish Doctor Who audio production titled Cuddlesome where he plays the Tinghus. He also played the Black Guardian in two audios: The Destroyer of Delights and The Chaos Pool. Finally, he returned as King Peladon in The Prisoner of Peladon audio, and in 2011 in The Crimes of Thomas Brewster. He reprised the role in 2022’s Peladon audio collection featuring a brief appearance from David Tennant's 10th Doctor.

In 2011, it was announced that David Troughton would be taking on his father's role as the Second Doctor in two audio plays, also featuring Tom Baker as the Fourth Doctor. He has also performed regularly as a notable villain in the BBC series New Tricks. In the same year he appeared (uncredited) in the US remake of The Girl with the Dragon Tattoo alongside Daniel Craig.

He toured alongside Alison Steadman in a production of Enjoy by Alan Bennett, playing the role of Dad. He starred alongside Kevin Spacey in a production of Inherit the Wind by Jerome Lawrence and Robert Edwin Lee at London's Old Vic theatre which ran from 18 September to 20 December 2009.

In 2011, he appeared as Stan Astill in the Sky1 comedy series The Café. In 2012, he guest starred in an episode of Holby City as a character named Ritchie Mooney. Although they did not appear in the same episode, his real-life son Sam Troughton appeared five weeks later as his character's son Nick Mooney. In November 2013, Troughton appeared in the one-off 50th anniversary comedy homage The Five(ish) Doctors Reboot.

In January 2014, he took on the role of Tony Archer, from Colin Skipp who, for 46 years, had played the part in the BBC radio series The Archers. In November that year, fiction caught up with reality when his son, William Troughton, took over the role of Tom Archer, Tony's son, from Tom Graham.

David Troughton played the role of Simon Eyre in The Shoemaker's Holiday for the Royal Shakespeare Company from 11 December 2014 to 7 March 2015; he also played the role of Gloucester in Gregory Doran's version of King Lear. He returned to the Company in 2017 to play the title role in Titus Andronicus, before playing Falstaff in The Merry Wives of Windsor in 2018.

Troughton co-starred with Fiona O'Shaughnessy in the romantic horror comedy film Nina Forever (2015).

== Filmography ==
=== Film ===
Year	Title	Role	Notes
1982	Give Us This Day	Fred	
1984	The Chain	Dudley	
1985	Dance with a Stranger	Cliff Davis	
1994	The Terror Game	Egan	Direct-to-video films
1994	Breach of the Peace	Egan	Direct-to-video films
1995	Eye of the Beholder	Egan	Direct-to-video films
1999	Captain Jack	Emmett	
2004	Battle of the Brave	English General	Original title: Nouvelle-France
2005	The Tape	Dark Figure	Short film
2015	Nina Forever	Dan	
2016	ChickLit	Justin	
2016	The Levelling	Aubrey	
2019	Frank & Mary	Frank	Short films
2021	Small World	Ted	Short films

=== Television ===
Year	Title	Role	Notes
1963	ITV Play of the Week	Smithers	Series 8; episode 22: "The Tin Whistle Man"
1968	Doctor Who	Guard	Series 5; episodes 21 & 22: "The Enemy of the World: Episodes 5 & 6". Uncredited role
1969	Doctor Who	Private Moor	Series 6; episode 40: "The War Games: Episode 6"
1972	Doctor Who	King Peladon	Series 9; episodes 5–8: "The Curse of Peladon: Episodes 1–4"
1972	The Regiment	Pvt. Albert Flack	Series 1; episodes 2 & 6: "The Fortunes of Peace" & "Gentlemen in Khaki Ordered South"
1972	Full House	Anthony	Documentary series; episodes 1–3
1972	Thirty-Minute Theatre	West	Series 8; episode 18: "You've Been a Long Time, Alfred"
1973	The Edwardians	Richard Lloyd George	Mini-series; episode 8: "Lloyd George"
1973	Warship	Doc Pitman	Series 1; episode 3: "Off Caps"
1973	Armchair Theatre	Henry	Series 15; episode 6: "The Square of Three"
1973	Wessex Tales	Cornelius Harlborough	Mini-series; episode 3: "A Tragedy of Two Ambitions"
1974	Crown Court	PC Mogridge	Series 3; episodes 22–24: "The Woman Least Likely: Parts 1–3"
1974	Napoleon and Love	Lieutenant Fourès	Mini-series; episode 3: "Pauline"
1974	Boy Dominic	Weatherbane's Assistant	Episode 11: "A Ghost in Greenwich"
1974	Microbes and Men	Viala	Episode 4: "Certain Death"
1974–1975	David Copperfield	Ham Peggotty	Mini-series; episodes 1–6
1975	The Love School	Frederick Stephens	Episodes 1–3: "The Brotherhood", "An Impeccable Elopement" & "Seeking the Bubbles"
1975	Anne of Avonlea	Jonas Blake	Mini-series; episodes 5 & 6
1975	BBC Play of the Month	Smiler Washington	Series 11; episode 1: "Chips with Everything"
1976	Angels	John Overton	Series 2; episode 9: "Accident"
1976	Jackanory Playhouse	Peter	Episode: "Peter and the Princess"
1976	Our Mutual Friend	Sloppy	Mini-series; episodes 3–7
1976	Survivors	Stan	Series 2; episode 3: "Lights of London: Part 1"
1976–1978	Wings	Lt. Richard Bravington	Pilot episode & series 1 & 2; 18 episodes
1977	Backs to the Land	Roy Whitlow	Series 1; episodes 1, 3 & 4
1977	The Norman Conquests	Tom	Mini-series; episodes 1–3
1978	Wodehouse Playhouse	Carter Muldoon	Series 3; episode 3: "Tangled Hearts"
1979	BBC Television Shakespeare	Surveyor	Series 1; episode 6: "The Famous History of the Life of King Henry the Eight"
1979	Crime and Punishment	Razumihin	Mini-series; episodes 2 & 3: "Part 2" & "Part 3"
1979	BBC2 Playhouse	Hogg H.	Series 6; episodes 1: "School Play"
1980	BBC2 Playhouse	Andrews	Series 6; episode 12: "The Enigma"
1980	Potter	Rodney	Series 2; episode 4
1980	Premiere	DC Cropper	Series 4; episode 2: "Braces High"
1980	Angels	Kevin Foreman	Series 6; 12 episodes
1981	The Life and Times of David Lloyd George	A. J. Sylvester	Mini-series; episodes 8 & 9: "Win or Lose" & "Footnotes of History"
1981	The Man of Destiny	The Lieutenant	Television film
1981	Smuggler	Lieutenant Phillips	Mini-series; episode 9: "Hogshead"
1981	ITV Playhouse	Katko	Series 13; episode 6: "Last Night Another Dissident..."
1981	Hi-de-Hi!	Sergeant Pritchard	Series 2; episode 5: "A Night Not to Remember"
1982	Sorry!	Brinsley	Series 2; episode 3: "Sons and Lovers"
1985	Theatre Night	Bouton	Series 1; episode 7: "Molière"
1986–1988	A Very Peculiar Practice	Dr. Bob Buzzard	Series 1 & 2; 14 episodes
1988	Executive Stress	Robin Endacott	Series 3; episode 4
1989	Bergerac	DI Walter	Series 7; episode 5: "Weekend Off"
1989	Theatre Night	Desmond Curry	Series 4; episode 3: "The Winslow Boy"
1989	Tales of Sherwood Forest	Det. Sgt. Terry	Episodes 1–7
1990	Rab C. Nesbitt	Doctor	Series 1; episode 4: "Drink"
1991	Performance	Detective Inspector Luff	Series 1; episode 6: "The Trials of Oz"
1992	Screen One	Dr. Bob Buzzard	Series 4; episode 1: "A Very Polish Practice"
1992	Boon	Terry Carpenter	Series 7; episode 8: "Is There Anybody There?"
1993	Agatha Christie's Poirot	Barton Russell	Series 5; episode 3: "The Yellow Iris"
1993	Bonjour la Classe	Eric Sweety	Episodes 1–6
1993	Sharpe	Sir Arthur Wellesley	Series 1; episodes 1 & 2: "Sharpe's Rifles" & "Sharpe's Eagle"
1994	Stages	Dore / Cook / Rust	Episode 3: "A Few Short Journeys of the Heart"
1997	Underworld	Martin	Mini-series; episodes 1–6
1998	Midsomer Murders	Brian Clapper	Series 1; episode 2: "Written in Blood"
1998	Drop the Dead Donkey	Roy Merchant Jnr.	Series 6; episodes 1 & 2: "The Newsmakers" & "Beasts, Badgers and Bombshells"
1998	Undercover Heart	Jim Ryan	Mini-series; episodes 1–6
1998	Cider with Rosie	Uncle Sid	Television film
1998, 2000	The Canterbury Tales	The Friar (voice)	Series 1; episode 1: "Leaving London" & series 2; episode 1: "The Journey Back"
1999	Heartbeat	Blenkiron	Series 9; episode 5: "Honor Among Thieves"
1999	Kavanagh QC	DCI Bob Kelso	Series 5; episode 3: "Time of Need"
1999	All the King's Men	King George V	Television film
2000	Madame Bovary	Homais	2-part television film
2002	The Secret	Tony	Episodes 1 & 2
2002	Ted and Alice	Stan	Mini-series; episodes 1–3
2002	Paradise Heights	Jack Edwards	Episodes 1–6
2003	The Last Detective	Yardley	Series 1; pilot episode
2003	Twelfth Night, or What You Will	Toby Belch	Television film
2003	Born and Bred	Fred Mills	Series 2; episode 3: "Blood Relations"
2003	Hearts of Gold	Evan Powell	Television film
2003	Trevor's World of Sport	Max	Episodes 3 & 5–7
2003	Foyle's War	Michael Bennett	Series 2; episode 2: "Among the Few"
2003	Casualty	Eddie West	Series 18; episode 15: "Never Judge a Book"
2004	In Denial of Murder	Ray Downing	2-part television film
2004	Animated Tales of the World	King (voice)	Series 3; episode 4: "The Story of Flax: A Tale from Poland"
2005	Fingersmith	Mr. Ibbs	Mini-series; episodes 1–3
2005	Jericho	Sgt. Clive Harvey	Mini-series; episodes 1–4
2006	Heartbeat	Les Cooper	Series 16; episode 1: "C'est la Vie"
2006	Casualty 1906	Hurry Fenwick	Television film
2006–2009	New Tricks	Ricky Hanson	Recurring role. Series 3–6; 4 episodes
2007	Midsomer Murders	Miles King	Series 10; episode 2: "The Animal Within"
2007	Diamond Geezer	DI Critchley	Mini-series; episode 1: "A Royal Affair"
2008	Casualty 1907	Hurry Fenwick	Mini-series; episodes 1–4
2008	Doctor Who	Professor Hobbes	Series 4; episode 10: "Midnight"
2009	Casualty 1909	Hurry Fenwick	Episodes 1, 2 & 4–6
2010	Combat Kids	Whedon	Episodes 1–3
2011	Outnumbered	Mr. Hunslet (Form Tutor)	Series 4; episodes 3, 4 & 6
2011–2013	The Café	Stan Astill	Series 1 & 2; 13 episodes
2012	Holby City	Ritchie Mooney	Series 14; episode 46: "Taxi for Spence"
2013	Doctors	Andrew Cruikshank	Series 15; episode 58: "Snowblind"
2013	The Five(ish) Doctors Reboot	Dalek Operator	Television film, available via the BBC Red Button
2014	Father Brown	John Tatton	Series 2; episode 9: "The Grim Reaper"
2014–2016	Grantchester	Chief Inspector Benson	Series 1; episode 6 & series 2; episodes 1, 2 & 5
2015	The Interceptor	Ralph	Mini-series; episodes 2–5
2015	Unforgotten	Geoff	Series 1; episodes 1, 2 & 5
2016	The Hollow Crown	Duke of Anjou	Series 2; episode 1: "Henry VI, Part 1"
2020	Life	Robert	Mini-series; episodes 1–4
2023	Fifteen-Love	Charles Lapthorn	Episodes 2, 5 & 6
2024	The Bay	Tommy Campbell	Series 5; episodes 1–6
2025	Call the Midwife	Alf Cottered	Series 14; episode 3
