= Sam Troughton =

British actor

- Born: Sam John Troughton; 21 March 1977 (age 49); Hampstead, London, England
- Occupation: Actor
- Years active: 2000–present
- Children: 1
- Father: David Troughton
- Relatives: Jim Troughton (brother); William Troughton (brother); Patrick Troughton (grandfather); Henry Crichton (great-grandfather); Michael Troughton (uncle); Harry Melling (cousin)

Sam John Troughton (born 21 March 1977) is an English actor who has made appearances in Robin Hood (2006–2009), Alien vs. Predator (2004), Hex (2005), The Town (2012), The Hollow Crown (2016), The Ritual (2017), Peterloo (2018), Chernobyl (2019), The Outlaws (2021), Litvinenko (2022), and Napoleon (2023).

== Early life ==
He is the son of actor David Troughton and the grandson of the second Doctor Who actor Patrick Troughton. His younger brothers are the former Warwickshire cricketer Jim Troughton, and actor William Troughton. Troughton attended Bridgetown Primary School in Stratford-upon-Avon and then Trinity Catholic School in Leamington Spa. He went on to study drama at the University of Hull, graduating in 1998.

== Career ==
Troughton is a Shakespearean actor who has worked with the Royal Shakespeare Company, and has thrice been nominated (2000, 2001, 2002) for the Ian Charleson Awards, awarded to young actors for performances in classic plays.

In 2005 Troughton starred in the horror films Spirit Trap alongside Billie Piper, and Alien vs. Predator, and several television productions including Sky One's Hex. He has appeared in the SAS-themed drama Ultimate Force. From October 2006 he appeared in the BBC Robin Hood series (2006–2009), in which he features as Robin's ex-manservant, Much.

Troughton's stage roles include Orlando in Samuel West's production of Shakespeare's As You Like It at the Crucible Theatre in Sheffield. He returned to the RSC as part of the 2009–2011 ensemble, appearing at the Courtyard Theatre in Stratford-upon-Avon. In 2009 he played Marcus Brutus in Julius Caesar and Third Gentleman in The Winter's Tale. In 2010 he played Romeo in Romeo & Juliet and King Arthur in Morte D'Arthur at the Courtyard Theatre. Other roles include a stage production of A Streetcar Named Desire in Liverpool.

He played Thomas in Bull at the Crucible Theatre in Sheffield in 2013 and Edmund in King Lear at the Royal National Theatre in January 2014.

Troughton starred in David Eldridge's new play Beginning at the Royal National Theatre and at the Ambassadors Theatre in 2018. More recently he starred in Chernobyl (2019) as Aleksandr Akimov. Between May and July 2019, he appeared in Rutherford and Son at the Royal National Theatre alongside Roger Allam.

In 2020 Troughton starred in the biographical comedy drama film Mank, alongside a cast which included Gary Oldman, Amanda Seyfried, Lily Collins and Charles Dance. In 2021 he appeared as Mr. Wilder, the community service boss, in The Outlaws, a BBC series created by and starring Stephen Merchant also featuring Christopher Walken.

In 2022 he played Detective Inspector Brian Tarpey in the ITV drama, Litvinenko, detailing the final days and subsequent murder investigation into the death of Russian defector Alexander Litvinenko.

In 2023 he appeared as the revolutionary Maximilien Robespierre in Napoleon, Ridley Scott's movie rendition of French leader Napoleon Bonaparte's life.

In 2025 Troughton played fictional reporter Murray Guthrie in the Sky Atlantic TV series Lockerbie: A Search for Truth.

== Filmography ==
=== Film ===
Year	Title	Role	Notes
2003	Sylvia	Tom Hadley-Clarke	
2004	Alien vs. Predator	Thomas Parks	
2004	Vera Drake	David	
2005	Spirit Trap	Nick	
2017	The Ritual	Dom	
2017	Slumber	Charlie Morgan	
2018	Peterloo	Mr. Hobhouse	Directed by Mike Leigh
2020	Mank	John Houseman	
2023	Napoleon	Maximilien Robespierre	

=== Television ===
Year	Title	Role	Notes
2000	Summer in the Suburbs	Police Constable	TV film
2002	Ultimate Force	Stuart	Episode: "The Killing House"
2002	Foyle's War	Policeman 2	Episode: "The German Woman"
2003	Seven Wonders of the Industrial World	H. Percy Boulnois	Episode: "The Sewer King"
2003	Judge John Deed	PC Doug Welkin	Episode: "Conspiracy"
2004	Gunpowder, Treason and Plot	Thomas Winter	TV film
2004	Messiah: The Promise	Thomas Stone	TV film
2005	Hex	Jez Heriot / Remiel	6 episodes
2006–2009	Robin Hood	Much	38 episodes
2012	Silent Witness	DI Johnny Vickers	2 episodes
2012	Holby City	Nick Mooney	Episode: "Blood Money"
2012	The Town	Jeff	3 episodes
2013	Dancing on the Edge	Prince of Wales	2 episodes
2016	The Hollow Crown	George, Duke of Clarence	2 episodes: "Henry VI part II", and "Richard III"
2016	Casualty	Sean Barnes	Episode: "All I Want for Christmas Is You"
2017	Midsomer Murders	Henry Marsh	Episode: "Crime and Punishment"
2018	Vera	Noel	ITV
2018	The Little Drummer Girl	Captain Meadows	2 episodes
2019	Chernobyl	Aleksandr Akimov	Miniseries; 4 episodes
2019–2020	The Trial of Christine Keeler	D.S. John Burrows	6 episodes
2020	Death in Paradise	Malcolm Simmons	Episode: "Murder on Mosquito Island"
2021	The Outlaws	Mr. Wilder	4 episodes
2021	Stephen	Ed Jarman	Miniseries, 3 episodes
2021	Ragdoll	Thomas Massey	4 episodes
2022	Litvinenko	DI Brian Tarpey	3 episodes
2023	The Lazarus Project	Dr. Samson	Recurring role
2024	A Very Royal Scandal	Donal McCabe	Miniseries, 3 episodes
2024	Black Doves	Stephen Yarrick	6 episodes
2025	Lockerbie: A Search for Truth	Murray Guthrie	5 episodes
2026	Prisoner	Will O’Neil	6 episodes
TBA	The Siege	TBA	Upcoming drama series

== Awards ==
Year	Award	Category	Work	Result	Ref
2000	Ian Charleson Awards	Outstanding performances by actors under 30 in classical roles	Henry VI, Part 1 - (Royal Shakespeare Company)	Nominated	
2001	Ian Charleson Awards	Outstanding performances by actors under 30 in classical roles	Richard III - (Royal Shakespeare Company)	Nominated	
2002	Ian Charleson Awards	Outstanding performances by actors under 30 in classical roles	Tartuffe - (Royal National Theatre)	Nominated	
