= Jim Troughton =

English cricketer and coach

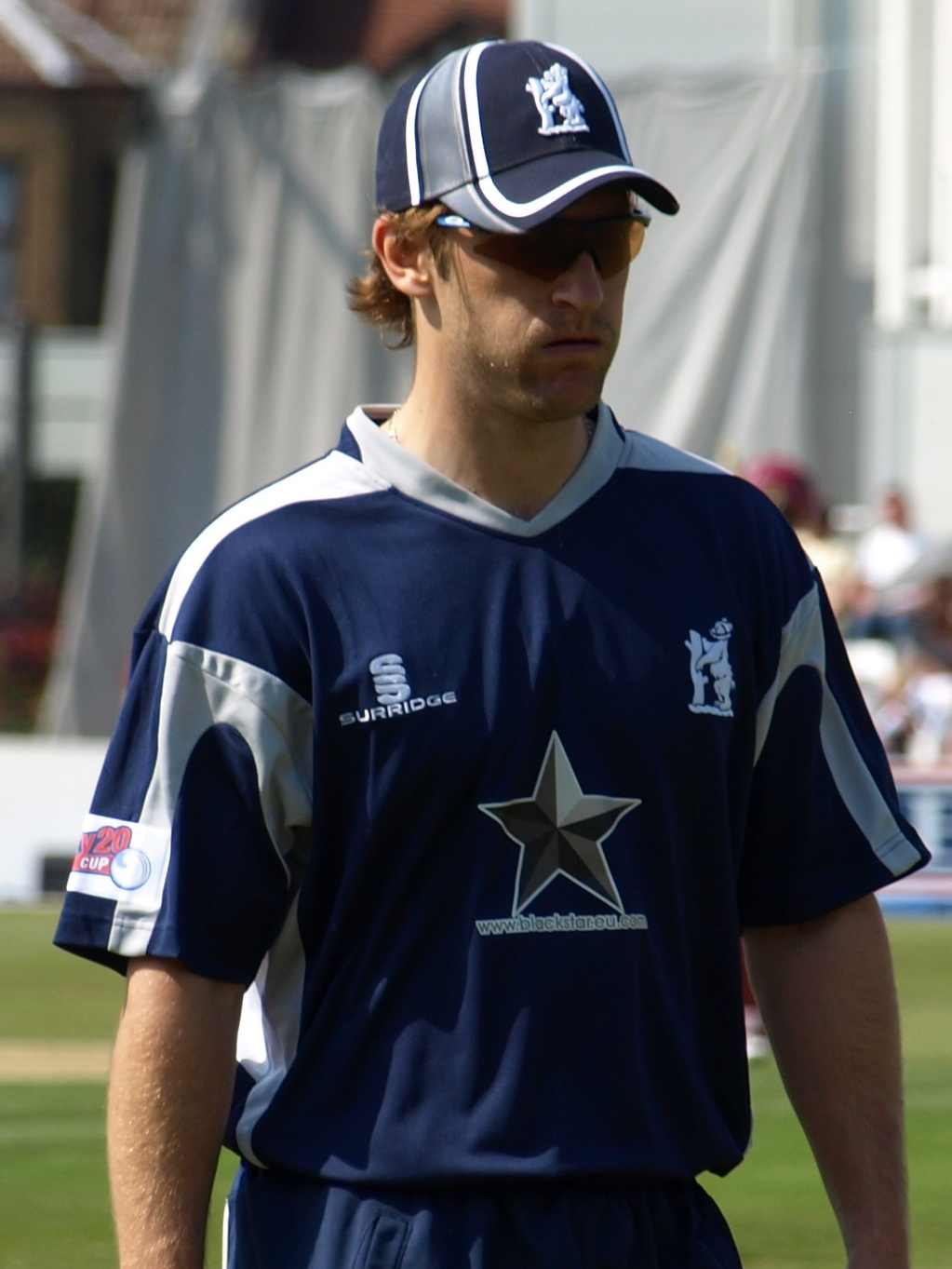

Personal information
- Full name: Jamie Oliver Troughton
- Born: 2 March 1979 (age 47); Camden, London, England
- Nickname: Troughts
- Height: 5 ft 11 in (1.80 m)
- Batting: Left-handed
- Bowling: Slow left arm orthodox
- Relatives: David Troughton (father); Sam Troughton (brother); William Troughton (brother); Patrick Troughton (grandfather); Henry Crichton (great-grandfather); Michael Troughton (uncle); Harry Melling (cousin)

International information
- National side: England
- ODI debut (cap 176): 17 June 2003 v Pakistan
- Last ODI: 3 July 2003 v South Africa

Domestic team information
- Years: Team
- 1999–2001: Warwickshire Cricket Board
- 2001–2014: Warwickshire

Career statistics
Competition	ODI	FC	LA	T20
Matches	6	167	169	88
Runs scored	36	8,491	3,654	1,740
Batting average	9.00	35.67	27.06	24.16
100s/50s	0/0	19/44	2/21	0/10
Top score	20	223	115*	68*
Balls bowled	–	2,357	736	96
Wickets	–	22	25	6
Bowling average	–	64.36	25.76	21.16
5 wickets in innings	–	0	0	0
10 wickets in match	–	0	0	0
Best bowling	–	3/1	4/23	2/10
Catches/stumpings	1/–	88/–	64/–	36/–
- Source: CricketArchive, 21 August 2019
- Troughton's voice recorded April 2015

Jamie Oliver Troughton (born 2 March 1979) is an English cricket coach and former cricketer. He is currently assistant coach at Surrey, and as a player was mainly an attack-minded left-handed batsman and an occasional slow left-arm orthodox bowler. He played for (and captained) Warwickshire. He also played for the England One Day International team.

== Family and acting ==
Troughton was born into a well-known British acting family. He is the son of the stage and television actor David Troughton, who is a leading member of the Royal Shakespeare Company, and the nephew of Michael Troughton. His grandfather, Patrick Troughton, was best known for playing the Second Doctor in Doctor Who. He is also the younger brother of Robin Hood actor Sam Troughton and the cousin of Harry Melling, who appeared in the Harry Potter films. In 2014, Jim played Colin Blythe in an episode of BBC Radio 4 drama Home Front.

== Cricket career ==
He played six one day internationals for England, scoring 36 runs at an average of nine. He was a hard-hitting batsman with a good range of shots. He averaged a respectable 40 plus in the four-day county game. He won the NBC Denis Compton Award in 2002.

He was named Warwickshire captain for the 2011 season in November 2010. Troughton captained Warwickshire to 2nd place in the 2011 County Championship, losing out on the title on the last day of the final game, with Lancashire finishing as champions. However, this disappointment was short-lived as Troughton oversaw Warwickshire win the County Championship a year later.

On 19 August 2014, Troughton announced that he would be retiring, with immediate effect, because of a back injury. On 15 December 2016, Warwickshire County Cricket Club appointed him as First Team Coach. In 2021 he joined the coaching staff at Somerset. In January 2022, he joined Surrey as an assistant to new head coach Gareth Batty, having turned down an offer to join Yorkshire in a similar role.
