= Aleksandr Akimov =

Soviet engineer (1953–1986)

Aleksandr F. Akimov
- Александр Акимов
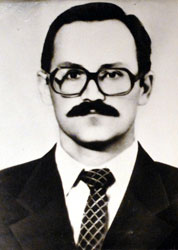
- Undated identity picture
- Born: 6 May 1953; Novosibirsk, Soviet Union
- Died: 10 May 1986 (aged 33); Moscow, Soviet Union
- Cause of death: Acute radiation syndrome
- Education: Moscow Power Engineering Institute
- Occupation: Nuclear engineer
- Years active: 1979-1986
- Known for: Unit shift supervisor of Unit 4 at Chernobyl Nuclear Power Plant
- Spouse: Natalya Akimova
- Awards: Order For Courage

Aleksandr Fyodorovich Akimov (Russian: Александр Фёдорович Акимов; 6 May 1953 – 10 May 1986) was a Soviet engineer who was the supervisor of the shift that worked at the Chernobyl Nuclear Power Plant Reactor Unit 4 on the night of the Chernobyl disaster, 26 April 1986.

== Biography ==
Aleksandr Akimov was born on 6 May 1953 in Novosibirsk, then part of the Soviet Union.

In 1976, Akimov graduated from the Moscow Power Engineering Institute, with the degree of specialist in engineering and automation of heat and power processes.

He began his career at the Chernobyl Nuclear Power Plant in September 1979. During his first years at Chernobyl, he held positions of senior turbine management engineer and shift supervisor of the turbine hall.

On 10 July 1984, Akimov was appointed to the position of shift supervisor of Reactor Unit 4.

== Chernobyl disaster ==
On the night of 26 April 1986, Akimov was on duty as the shift supervisor of Chernobyl's electronuclear plant 4th power unit. The reactor power level had been reduced, preparing for a planned safety test. The test was supervised by deputy chief engineer Anatoly Dyatlov, who was Akimov's superior. The reactor stalled unexpectedly during test preparations, reportedly due to a mistake made by Leonid Toptunov. Raising power after this point put the reactor into a potentially dangerous state due to design flaws, unbeknownst to the operators. During the test, Akimov called for the AZ-5 (scram) button to be pressed to shut down the reactor. Toptunov, following Akimov's every order, pushed AZ-5. Due to a design flaw, the descending control rods momentarily accelerated the nuclear reaction and caused the reactor to explode. The communications networks were suddenly flooded with calls and information. Akimov heard reports of massive reactor damage but did not believe it and, as a result, relayed false information about the state of the reactor for hours thereafter.

Akimov worked with his crew in the reactor building after learning the accident's extent. They tried to pump water into the exposed reactor core until the morning. He worked with Toptunov, Nekhaev, Uskov and Orlov to manually open water valves in an attempt to increase water supply to the reactor, during which time Akimov and Toptunov began to experience symptoms of acute radiation syndrome and were sent to the infirmary. Akimov was exposed during his work to a lethal dose of 15–20 Gy of radiation.

He was admitted to Pripyat Hospital but was quickly transferred to Moscow Hospital 6. By 28 April, the symptoms of 4th degree radiation sickness were evident. His wife visited him in hospital and while aware he might not survive, he told her that he would give up working in the nuclear industry. During his stay, he discussed possible causes of the accident with Toptunov and Dyatlov but they were mystified. Toptunov received a bone marrow transplant in an attempt to restore his immune system. Akimov's condition quickly worsened and it was decided a bone marrow transplant was not sufficient, so in a last-ditch effort to save his life a foetal liver cell transplant was administered; it however failed. By the time accident investigator Sergei Yankovsky questioned him, Akimov could barely speak and could not provide much more information. Akimov eventually succumbed to acute radiation syndrome two weeks after the disaster at the age of 33. His family was informed that his death was the only reason he was not prosecuted for the accident.

While the initial Soviet investigation put almost all the blame on the operators, later findings by the IAEA found that the reactor design and how the operators were informed of safety information was more significant. Nonetheless, the operators were found to have deviated from operational procedures, changing test protocols on the fly, and having made "ill judged" actions, making human action major factors. Some articles have challenged this line of thought, stating that the operators' actions were not ill judged.

== Recognition ==
In 2008, Akimov was posthumously awarded with the 3rd degree Order For Courage by Viktor Yushchenko, the then-President of Ukraine.

He was portrayed by actor Aleksandr Khoroshko in the 2004 Zero Hour television series and by Sam Troughton in the 2019 HBO miniseries Chernobyl.

== See also ==
- Deaths due to the Chernobyl disaster
- Individual involvement in the Chernobyl disaster § Aleksandr Fyodorovich Akimov
