= Harry Melling =

British actor (born 1989)

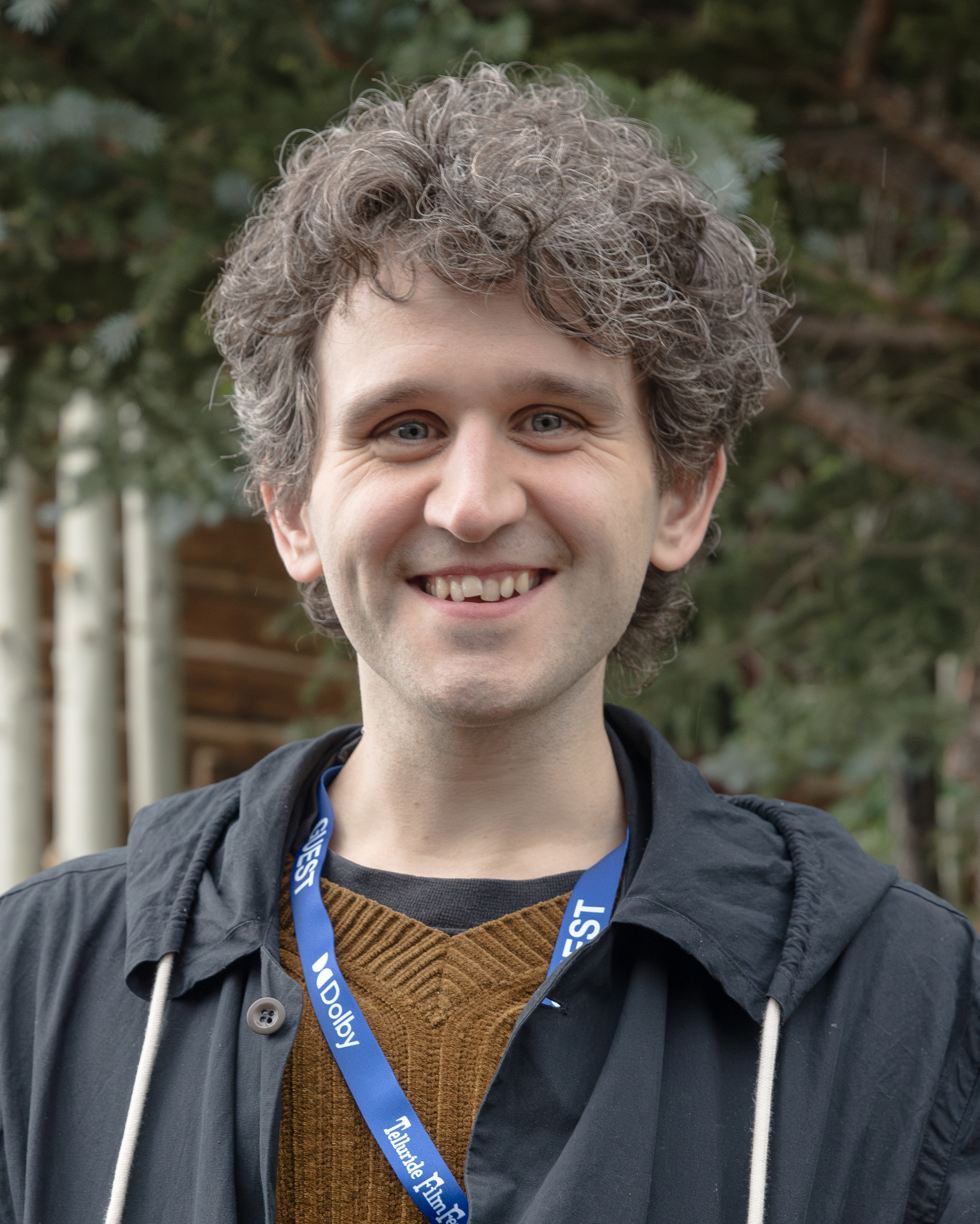
- Melling in 2025
- Born: Harry Edward Melling; 17 March 1989 (age 37); London, England
- Education: London Academy of Music and Dramatic Art
- Occupation: Actor
- Years active: 2000–present
- Known for: Dudley Dursley in Harry Potter
- Relatives: Patrick Troughton (grandfather); David Troughton (uncle); Michael Troughton (uncle); Sam Troughton (cousin); Jim Troughton (cousin); William Troughton (cousin)

Harry Edward Melling (born 17 March 1989) is an English actor who first came to international attention for playing Dudley Dursley in the Harry Potter films (2001–2010). Since then, he has come to prominence for his well-received performances in The Ballad of Buster Scruggs (2018), The Pale Blue Eye (2022), and Pillion (2025).

== Early life and education ==
Harry Edward Melling was born on 17 March 1989 in London, England. His maternal grandfather is actor Patrick Troughton. He studied at the London Academy of Music and Dramatic Art.

== Career ==
=== Early work and Harry Potter (1999–2016) ===
In his early career, Melling performed in stage productions of The Provoked Wife, King John, Antigone, and Plenty. He appeared in five of the Harry Potter films as Harry Potter's spoiled cousin, Dudley Dursley. He was first cast in the role at age 10, in 1999, and played the character until 2010 and his appearance in Harry Potter and the Deathly Hallows – Part 1.

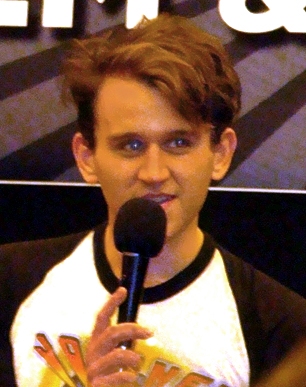
Melling in 2011

In 2009, Melling starred in a revival of Mother Courage and Her Children at the Royal National Theatre. He appeared in "The Sorcerer's Shadow", an episode of the BBC television series Merlin, playing a young warlock who intends to use magic to help him win Camelot's legendary tournament. He also played Robert Brown in the BBC television series Just William. By 2009, Melling had lost so much weight since Order of the Phoenix, the fifth Harry Potter film, that he was now "unrecognisable". The role of Dudley was almost recast for Deathly Hallows – Part 1, but Melling was able to reprise the part by wearing a fatsuit. He said of the change, "I can now shed the child actor thing, like the fat, and start a new career, because no one sees me as Dudley."

In 2014, Melling made his playwriting debut at HighTide Festival with his one-man show Peddling.

=== Breakthrough and critical acclaim (2018–present) ===
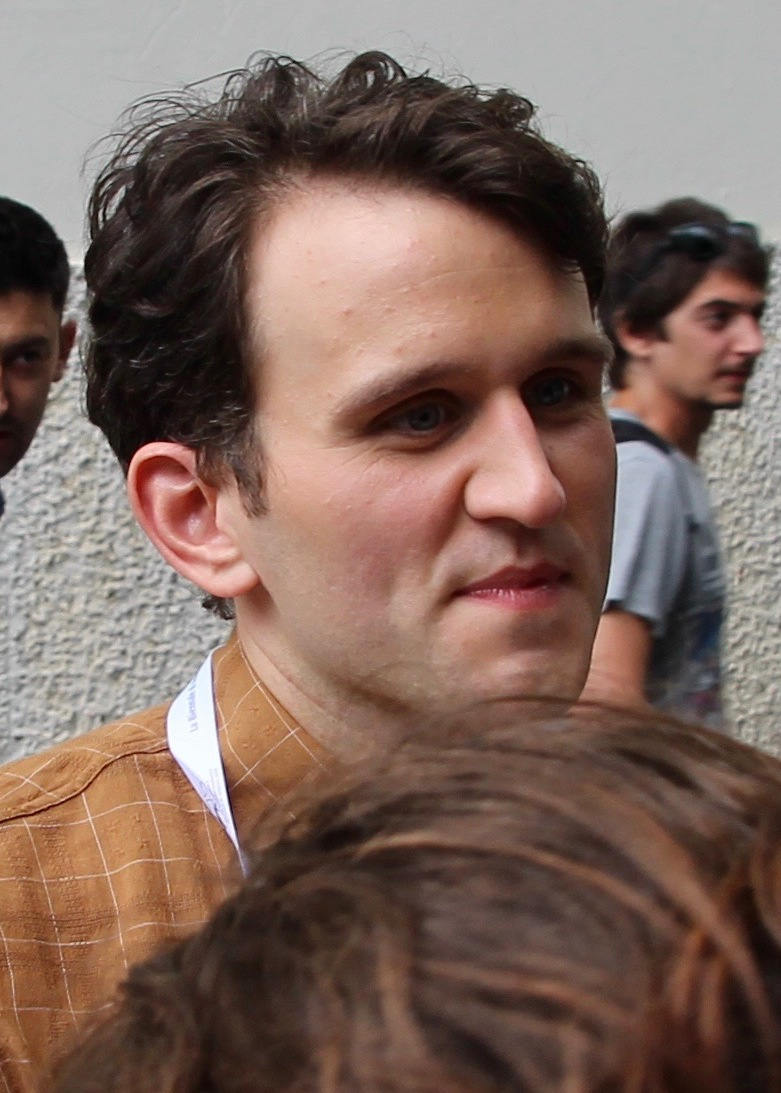
Melling at the 2018 Venice Film Festival

In 2018, Melling played a significant part alongside Liam Neeson in the Coen brothers' Western The Ballad of Buster Scruggs. Of Melling's performance, The New Yorker film critic Anthony Lane wrote: "[I] came away haunted by a scattering of sights and sounds—above all, by the recitations of the limbless man, which thrum with genuine yearning. He is beautifully played, with a little help from C.G.I., by Harry Melling, who was once the odious Dudley Dursley in the Harry Potter films. Funny how people grow up." Melling later credited his casting in the Coen brothers film as being instrumental in future career opportunities, such as The Pale Blue Eye.

Between 2020 and 2021, Melling appeared in a slew of supporting roles in successful dramas. In 2020, he played evangelical preacher Roy Laferty in the Netflix thriller The Devil All The Time. The same year, he appeared in several episodes of the Netflix miniseries The Queen's Gambit as Harry Beltik, a chess player who becomes a friend and brief love interest of the protagonist Beth Harmon, played by Anya Taylor-Joy. Melling learned how to play chess for his part and elaborated "that’s part of the joy of acting, I think, all these new challenges you face along the way." The series went on to become the most watched miniseries on Netflix at the time. The next year, Melling collaborated with Joel Coen again for The Tragedy of Macbeth.

In 2022, he had his first leading role as a young Edgar Allan Poe in the crime drama film The Pale Blue Eye, opposite Christian Bale. Elaborating on his casting of Melling, director Scott Cooper stated: "The reason I cast Harry was because of The Ballad of Buster Scruggs... I was utterly enthralled and thought that he was the only person who could play Edgar Allan Poe. It was [the way he delivered those readings,] and it was his look, as he fortunately bears a resemblance to what I imagined a young Poe to be like. He has a sense of vulnerability he isn’t afraid to express. I knew he could handle all of these long passages of dialogue that I have."

In 2025, he starred alongside Alexander Skarsgård in Pillion, an erotic drama film produced by Element Pictures.

== Filmography ==
=== Film ===
| Year | Title | Role | Notes |
|---|---|---|---|
| 2001 | Harry Potter and the Philosopher's Stone | Dudley Dursley | |
| 2002 | Harry Potter and the Chamber of Secrets | Dudley Dursley | |
| 2004 | Harry Potter and the Prisoner of Azkaban | Dudley Dursley | |
| 2007 | Harry Potter and the Order of the Phoenix | Dudley Dursley | |
| 2010 | Harry Potter and the Deathly Hallows – Part 1 | Dudley Dursley | |
| 2016 | The Lost City of Z | William Barclay | |
| 2017 | The Current War | Benjamin Vale | |
| 2018 | The Ballad of Buster Scruggs | Harrison | Segment: "Meal Ticket" |
| 2018 | The Keeper | Sergeant Smythe | |
| 2019 | Waiting for the Barbarians | Garrison Soldier 4 | |
| 2020 | The Old Guard | Steven Merrick | |
| 2020 | Say Your Prayers | Tim | |
| 2020 | The Devil All the Time | Roy Laferty | |
| 2021 | The Tragedy of Macbeth | Malcolm | |
| 2022 | Please Baby Please | Arthur | |
| 2022 | The Pale Blue Eye | Edgar Allan Poe | |
| 2023 | Shoshana | Geoffrey J. Morton | |
| 2024 | Harvest | Charles Kent | |
| 2025 | Pillion | Colin | |
| 2026 | Butterfly Jam | Marat | |
| 2026 | Stuffed | Bernie | |

=== Television ===
| Year | Title | Role | Notes | Ref. |
|---|---|---|---|---|
| 2005 | Friends and Crocodiles | Young Oliver | Television film | |
| 2010 | Merlin | Gilli | Episode: "The Sorcerer's Shadow" | |
| 2010 | Just William | Robert Brown | 4 episodes | |
| 2011 | Garrow's Law | George Pinnock | 3 episodes | |
| 2013 | Joe Mistry | Joe | Television film | |
| 2016 | The Musketeers | Bastien | Episode: "Fool's Gold" | |
| 2019 | The War of the Worlds | Artilleryman | Miniseries, 2 episodes | |
| 2019 | His Dark Materials | Sysselman | Episode: "Armour" | |
| 2020 | The Queen's Gambit | Harry Beltik | Miniseries, 4 episodes | |
| 2024 | Wolf Hall: The Mirror and the Light | Thomas Wriothesley | | |

=== Stage ===
| Year | Title | Role | Venue | Ref. |
|---|---|---|---|---|
| 2009 | Mother Courage and her Children | Swiss Cheese | Royal National Theatre | |
| 2010 | Bedroom, Dens and Other Forms of Magic | | Theatre503 | |
| 2010 | Women Beware Women | Young Ward | Royal National Theatre | |
| 2011 | The School for Scandal | Sir Benjamin Backbite | Barbican Centre | |
| 2011 | When Did You Last See My Mother? | Ian | Trafalgar Studios | |
| 2012 | I Am a Camera | Christopher Isherwood | Southwark Playhouse | |
| 2013 | Smack Family Robinson | Sean Robinson | Rose Theatre, Kingston | |
| 2013 | The Hothouse | Lamb | Trafalgar Studios | |
| 2013 | King Lear | Fool | Minerva Theatre, Chichester | |
| 2014 | King Lear | Fool | Brooklyn Academy of Music | |
| 2014 | peddling | Boy | HighTide Festival | |
| 2014 | The Angry Brigade | Morris; Commander; Prophet; Snitch; Manager; Jim | Theatre Royal, Plymouth; Oxford Playhouse; Warwick Arts Centre; Watford Palace Theatre | |
| 2016 | Hand to God | Jason/Tyrone | Vaudeville Theatre, London | |
| 2016 | King Lear | Edgar | The Old Vic | |
| 2017 | Jam | Kane | Finborough Theatre | |

=== Video game ===
| Year | Title | Role | Notes | Ref. |
|---|---|---|---|---|
| 2007 | Harry Potter and the Order of the Phoenix | Dudley Dursley | Voice | |

== Accolades ==
| Year | Award | Category | Work | Result | Ref. |
|---|---|---|---|---|---|
| 2025 | Valladolid International Film Festival | Best Actor | Pillion | Won | |
| 2025 | Thessaloniki Film Festival | Best Actor | Pillion | Won | |
| 2025 | Stockholm International Film Festival | Best Actor | Pillion | Won | |
| 2025 | British Independent Film Awards | Best Lead Performance | Pillion | Nominated | |
| 2026 | Newport Beach Film Festival | Breakout Artist | Pillion | Won | |
