= Hippolyte Charles =

Josephine Bonaparte's lover

- Born: 6 July 1773; Romans-sur-Isère, France
- Died: 8 March 1837 (aged 63); Paris, France
- Military career
- Allegiance: First French Republic; First French Empire
- Branch: French Army
- Rank: Lieutenant

Hippolyte Charles (July 6, 1773 – March 8, 1837) was an officer in the French Army who was best known for being Joséphine Bonaparte's lover soon after her marriage to Napoleon Bonaparte.

== Biography ==
Born in Romans-sur-Isère to a bourgeois family in 1773, Louis-Hippolyte Charles joined the French Army as a volunteer with his older brother. In 1796, while Napoleon Bonaparte was busy winning his first victories in Italy, Charles, a lieutenant in a Hussar regiment and aide-de-camp to General Charles Leclerc, Bonaparte's brother-in-law, first met Joséphine in Paris. They began an affair almost immediately, although she was nine years his senior. Hippolyte Charles was a southerner who made up for his short stature with a very handsome face with a dark complexion and long black whiskers and moustache. According to the Duchess of Abrantes, "Charles spoke only puns and was the buffoon," but she added that, "he was what is called a strange boy, he made people laugh, it was impossible to find a funnier man." Unlike Napoleon, Charles was extremely relaxed and was not restricted by a constant schedule. Napoleon was always serving the state or following a strict regimen. With Hippolyte Charles, Joséphine could relax, joke around with, and even discuss matters like fashion, a subject in which Charles was a very perspicacious authority. Charles was attracted to Joséphine for her confidence, power, and sexual experience.

On June 24, 1796, Joséphine decided to rejoin Napoleon, accompanied by her lover Hippolyte, her brother-in-law Joseph Bonaparte and Colonel Jean-Andoche Junot. On 13 July, she found Napoleon at the gates of Milan. However, she continued her affair with Hippolyte soon afterwards on the way back to Paris. It is rumoured that the two lovers were involved in some illicit business dealings as well. The recently promoted captain, enriched through these dubious business transactions, was able to leave the army.

On March 17, 1798, the two lovers were denounced to Napoleon, sending him into a great rage. However, Joséphine was able to soothe him and convince him that the rumours were untrue. In July 1798, when Napoleon was in Egypt, the infidelities of his wife were once again reported to him, possibly by Junot. Napoleon wrote to his brother Joseph to prepare for divorce. Bonaparte's letter was intercepted by Admiral Horatio Nelson and published in London newspapers, and the loss of the French fleet prevented any correspondence. Learning of Napoleon's landing at Fréjus, Joséphine rushed to him to try to change his mind about the divorce. Although Napoleon sought a divorce, he would forgive Joséphine after she promised to end her affair. She became the first lady of the country and would take up residence at the Luxembourg Palace in Paris.

Hippolyte Charles saw Josephine for the last time in 1799, although they continued exchanging platonic letters about financial matters for a while afterwards. During the Consulate period, Charles maintained a close friendship with Jean-Andoche Junot.

In November 1804, Hippolyte Charles bought the estate of Cassan from Francois-Denis Courtillier. The source of the funds for this purchase is rumoured to have originated from his dubious business deals with Joséphine. In 1808, during the Peninsular War and under the protection of his old Hussar regiment, Hippolyte Charles travelled to Spain. The journey added considerably to his wealth, as he was able to acquire from a Spanish officer and French soldiers looted treasures, much of them previously looted from South America and the Inca Empire. He befriended the Spanish officer, originally from Buenos Aires, after recognising his peculiar secret society handshake.

Some time after the fall of the First French Empire, Charles had a daughter with his mistress.

Hippolyte Charles sold the Cassan estate in 1828 to Jacques-Honoré Recappé, a former notary public and general counsel of the Seine and Oise region. He decided to retire to his native land, where he bought an even more expensive castle in Génissieux in the Drôme. Hippolyte Charles died there in 1837. On his deathbed, Charles asked for his correspondence with Josephine to be burnt.

== In popular culture ==
In the novel Les Paysans, the author, Honoré de Balzac, bases his character the General Comte de Montcornet on Hippolyte Charles. The same character also appears in the book La Muse du département by the same author where Montcornet serves in the Peninsular war.

German actor Jannis Niewöhner portrayed Hippolyte Charles in the 2023 historical drama film Napoleon.
