= Patrick Troughton =

English actor (1920–1987)

- Troughton at a Doctor Who convention in Baltimore, Maryland, c. 1984
- Born: 25 March 1920; Mill Hill, Middlesex, England
- Died: 28 March 1987 (aged 67); Columbus, Georgia, U.S.
- Resting place: Cremated; Ashes scattered at Bushy Park, Teddington, Greater London, England
- Education: Embassy School of Acting; Leighton Rallius Studios
- Years active: 1937–1987
- Spouses: Margaret Dunlop (m. 1943; sep. 1956); Shelagh Holdup (m. 1976)
- Partner: Ethel Nuens (1956–1975)
- Children: 6, including David and Michael
- Relatives: Sam Troughton (grandson); Jim Troughton (grandson); William Troughton (grandson); Harry Melling (grandson)

Patrick George Troughton (/ˈtraʊtən/ TROW-tən; 25 March 1920 – 28 March 1987) was an English actor. Best known for playing character roles on television, he starred as the second incarnation of the Doctor in the BBC science fiction series Doctor Who from 1966 to 1969, and reprised the role three times between 1972 and 1985.

Troughton was classically trained at the Embassy School of Acting, and later enlisted with the Royal Navy during World War II. His early work included appearances in Laurence Olivier's Shakespeare film adaptations Hamlet (1948) and Richard III (1955). Troughton later appeared in the fantasy film Jason and the Argonauts (1963) and the horror films The Gorgon (1964), Scars of Dracula (1970) and The Omen (1976), as well as the fantasy television series The Box of Delights (1984).

== Early life ==
=== Family and education ===
Patrick George Troughton was born on 25 March 1920 in Mill Hill, Middlesex, to Alec Troughton, a solicitor with a shipping firm, and Dorothy (née Offord). He had an elder brother, Alec, and a younger sister, Mary.

Troughton made his first foray into show business when he attended a kindergarten ballet class run by Pearl Argyle. Troughton boarded at Bexhill Prep School for five years, then attended Mill Hill School. As a teen he acted in school productions, such as J. B. Priestley's Bees on the Boat Deck in March 1937. Mill Hill School later named their Patrick Troughton Theatre after him. Troughton was tutored by Eileen Thorndike at the Embassy School of Acting at Swiss Cottage. He was later awarded an acting scholarship at Leighton Rallius Studios in New York, United States, from June 1939.

=== Naval career ===
Troughton was studying in the United States when the Second World War broke out. He left the country on a Belgian ship to return home, but the ship hit an enemy sea mine and sank off Portland Bill in the English Channel. All aboard were rescued. On his return to England in 1939, Troughton briefly worked with the Tonbridge Repertory Company, playing Nick Bottom in a production of A Midsummer Night's Dream.

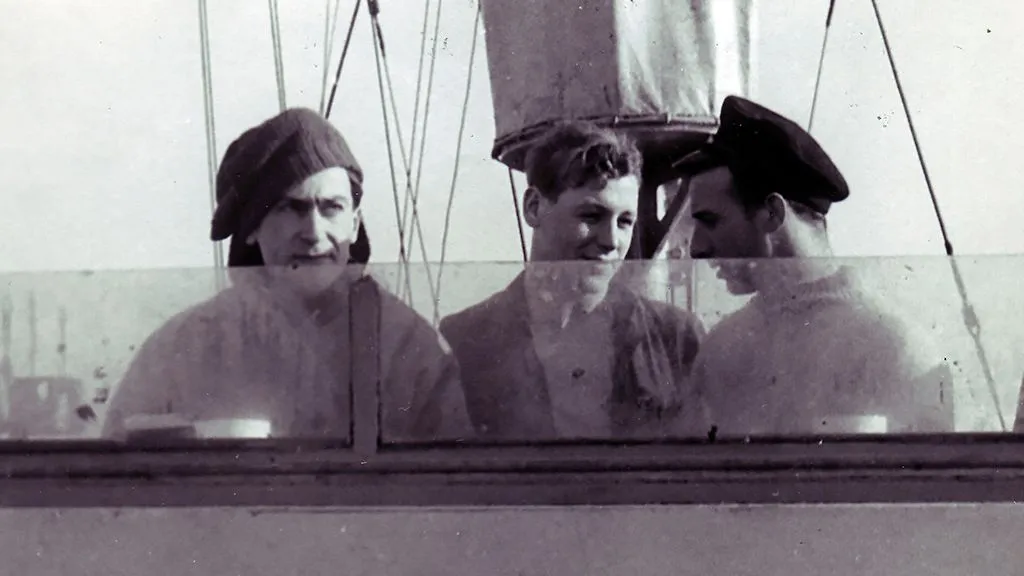
Troughton (left) served in the Royal Navy during World War II.

In June 1940, Troughton enlisted with the Royal Navy, receiving a commission with the Royal Navy Volunteer Reserve in November 1941. He was deployed on East Coast Convoy duty from February to August 1941, and then with Coastal Forces' Motor Gun Boats based at Great Yarmouth from November 1942 to 1945, operating in the North Sea and English Channel. During his service with the MGBs, he was on one occasion involved in an action against Kriegsmarine E-boats which resulted in one of the enemy craft being destroyed by ramming, whilst Troughton's boat and another destroyed two more with their gunfire. His decorations included the 1939–1945 Star, the Atlantic Star, and he was mentioned in dispatches "for outstanding courage, leadership and skill in many daring attacks on enemy shipping in hostile waters". He was nicknamed "Lieutenant Cosy" because he used to wear a tea cosy on his head in cold weather in the North Sea. Troughton met fellow naval sailor and future Doctor Who co-star Jon Pertwee several times during the war.

== Acting career ==
=== Early career ===
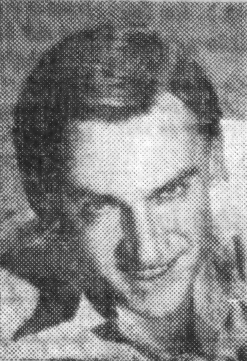
Troughton in a promotional photograph for R.U.R. in Radio Times, February 1948

After demobilisation, Troughton returned to the theatre. He worked with the Amersham Repertory Company, the Bristol Old Vic Company and the Pilgrim Players at the Mercury Theatre, Notting Hill Gate. He made his television debut in 1947. In 1948, Troughton made his film debut with small roles in Laurence Olivier's Hamlet, the Joseph L. Mankiewicz directed Escape (one of the stars of which was First Doctor actor William Hartnell), and a minor role as a pirate in Disney's Treasure Island (1950), appearing only during the attack on the heroes' hut.

In 1953, Troughton became the first actor to play the folk hero Robin Hood on television, starring in six half-hour episodes on BBC Television in the series Robin Hood, broadcast from 17 March to 21 April. Troughton would also make several appearances in The Adventures of Robin Hood, starring Richard Greene. He appeared as the murderer Tyrrell in Olivier's film of Richard III (1955). He was also Olivier's stand-in on the film and appears in many long shots as Richard.

Troughton's other notable film and television roles included Kettle in Chance of a Lifetime (1950), Sir Andrew Ffoulkes in The Scarlet Pimpernel (1955), Vickers in the episode entitled "Strange Partners" in The Invisible Man (1958, the series also featured one of his future Doctor Who co-stars, Deborah Watling, as Sally), Phineus in Jason and the Argonauts (1963), Paul of Tarsus (BBC 1960, title role), Dr. Finlay's Casebook (BBC 1962, semi-regular), and Quilp in The Old Curiosity Shop (1962–63). He voiced Winston Smith in a 1965 BBC Home Service radio adaptation of Nineteen Eighty-Four. Prior to Doctor Who he appeared in numerous TV shows, including The Count of Monte Cristo, Ivanhoe, Dial 999, Danger Man, Maigret, Compact, The Third Man, Crane, Detective, Sherlock Holmes, No Hiding Place, The Saint, Armchair Theatre, The Wednesday Play, Z-Cars, Adam Adamant Lives! and Softly, Softly.

Troughton turned down the role of Johnny Ringo in the Doctor Who story The Gunfighters (1966).

=== Doctor Who ===
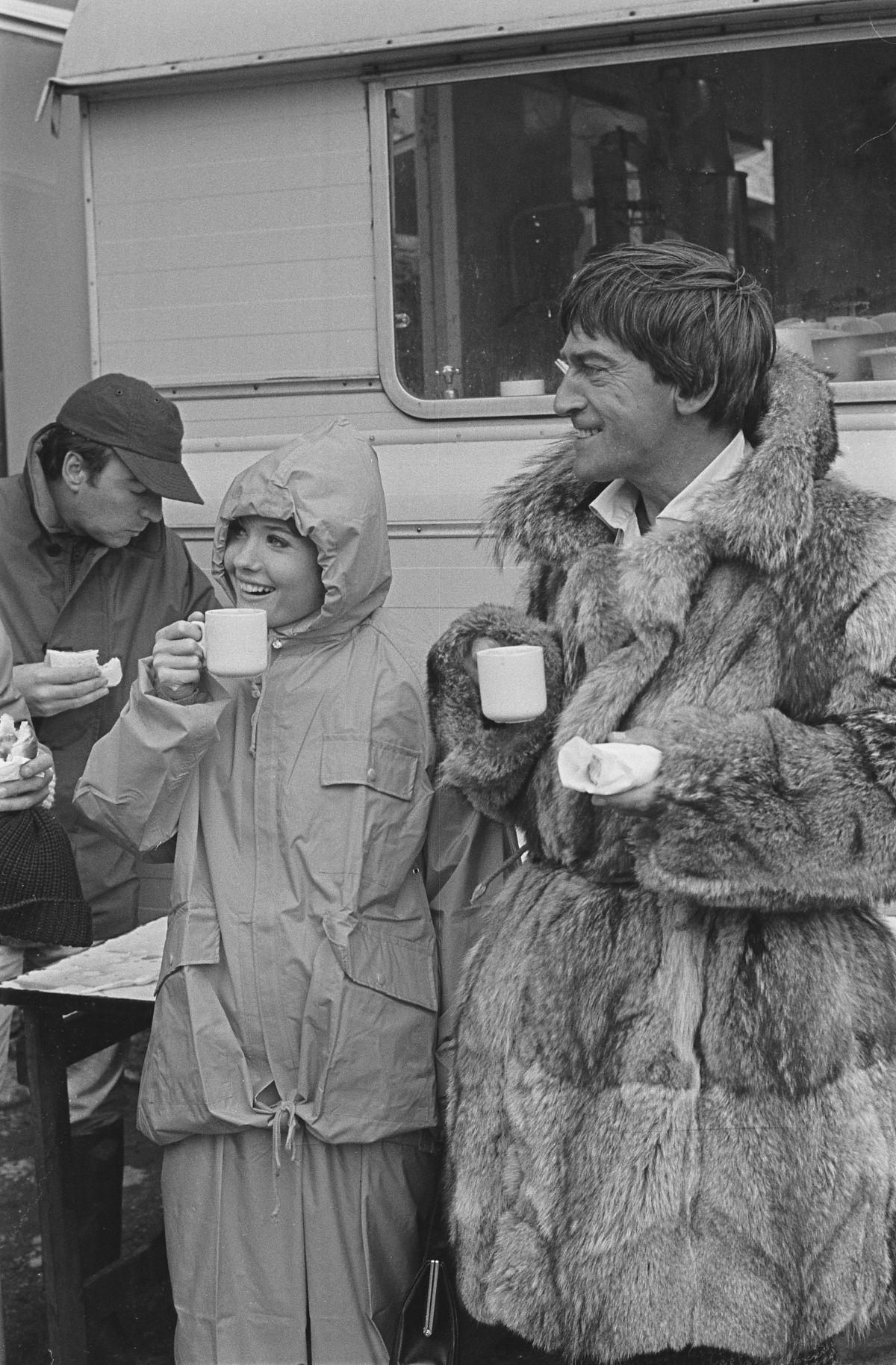
Troughton with Deborah Watling during filming of The Abominable Snowmen (1967)

In 1966, Doctor Who producer Innes Lloyd looked for a replacement for William Hartnell in the series' lead role. The continued survival of the show depended on audiences accepting another actor in the role, despite the bold decision that the replacement would not be a Hartnell lookalike or soundalike. Lloyd later stated that Hartnell had approved of the choice, saying, "There's only one man in England who can take over, and that's Patrick Troughton". Lloyd chose Troughton because of his extensive and versatile experience as a character actor. After he was cast, Troughton considered various ways to approach the role, to differentiate his portrayal from Hartnell's amiable-yet-tetchy patriarch. Troughton's early thoughts about how he might play the Doctor included a "tough sea captain", and a piratical figure in blackface and turban. Doctor Who creator Sydney Newman suggested that the Doctor could be a "cosmic hobo" in the mould of Charlie Chaplin, and this was the interpretation eventually chosen. Troughton was the first Doctor to have his face appear in the opening titles of the show. In one serial, The Enemy of the World, Troughton played two parts: as the protagonist (The Doctor) and the antagonist (Salamander).

In a rare interview with Ernest Thompson from Radio Times, Troughton revealed that he "always liked dressing up, and would have been happy as a school teacher as children keep one young". Troughton was popular with both the production team and his co-stars. Lloyd credited Troughton with a "leading actor's temperament. He was a father figure to the whole company and hence could embrace it and sweep it along with him". Troughton also gained a reputation on set as a practical joker.

Many of the Doctor Who episodes in which Troughton appeared were discarded by the BBC due to archival policy. Troughton found Doctor Who's schedule (at the time, 40 to 44 episodes per year) gruelling, and decided to leave the series in 1969, after three years in the role. This decision was also motivated in part by fear of being typecast.

Troughton returned to Doctor Who three times after formally leaving the programme. The first of these occasions was in The Three Doctors, the 1972–73 serial opening the programme's 10th series. In 1983, Troughton overcame some reluctance to reprise his role and agreed to appear in the 20th-anniversary special "The Five Doctors" at the request of series producer John Nathan-Turner. He also agreed to attend Doctor Who conventions, including the show's 20th anniversary celebrations at Longleat in 1983. He also appeared around the world with Nathan-Turner. Troughton enjoyed the return to the programme so much that he readily agreed to appear one more time as the Second Doctor, with Colin Baker's Sixth Doctor in The Two Doctors (1985). He reportedly also advised Fifth Doctor actor Peter Davison to limit his time in the role to three series to avoid typecasting, and Davison followed this advice.

=== Later career ===
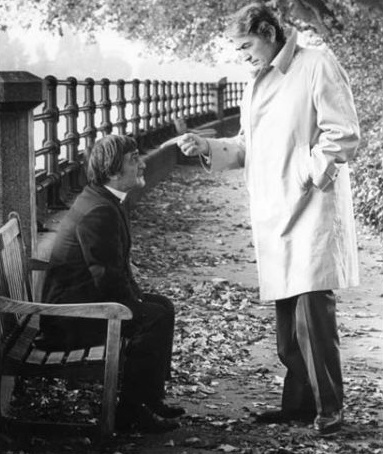
Troughton (left) with Gregory Peck in a publicity still for The Omen (1976)

After Troughton left Doctor Who in 1969, he appeared in various films and television roles. His film roles included Klove in Scars of Dracula (1970), a bodysnatcher in Frankenstein and the Monster from Hell (1973), Father Brennan in The Omen (1976), and Melanthius in Sinbad and the Eye of the Tiger (1977). His television roles included the recurring role of Thomas Howard, 3rd Duke of Norfolk, in five of the six episodes of The Six Wives of Henry VIII (1970) (for which he commenced rehearsals just one week after completing his final studio recording on Doctor Who), the villainous Nasca in Thames Television's Aztec-themed drama The Feathered Serpent (1976–78), a guest-starring spot in the comedy series The Goodies in the episode "The Baddies", as well as episodes of Paul Temple, Dr. Finlay's Casebook, Doomwatch, The Persuaders!, A Family at War, Coronation Street, Softly, Softly: Task Force, Colditz, Play for Today, Z-Cars, Special Branch, Sutherland's Law, The Sweeney, Jason King, Survivors, Crown Court, Angels, Warship, Van der Valk, Space: 1999, The Onedin Line, Yanks Go Home, All Creatures Great and Small, Only When I Laugh (Series 2 Episode 9), Nanny and Minder (in a March 1984 episode titled "Windows", Season 4 Episode 9). He also portrayed Cole Hawlings in a BBC Television dramatisation of the John Masefield children's book The Box of Delights (1984). In the same year he also appeared in a Two Ronnies Christmas Special playing a judge.

Troughton featured in the 1974 11-part radio adaptation of Evelyn Waugh's Sword of Honour. In 1986, he was a regular in the first series of the LWT sitcom The Two of Us, and guested in an episode of Super Gran in May 1987, which was the last role he filmed. His final television appearance was in the autumn of the same year in Knights of God, which had been filmed two years earlier. Troughton also appeared in the first episode of Central Independent Television's Inspector Morse, entitled "The Dead of Jericho", which was originally transmitted on ITV on 6 January 1987.

== Personal life ==
=== Family ===
Troughton married Margaret Dunlop in 1943. They had three children: Joanna (born 1947), illustrator of children's books, David (born 1950), actor and Michael (born 1955), actor. Troughton and Dunlop's grandchildren include cricketer Jim Troughton and actors Sam Troughton, William Troughton and Harry Melling.

In 1956, Troughton left Dunlop and their three children for his girlfriend Ethel "Bunny" Nuens, with whom he also went on to have three children: Jane, Peter and Mark. He successfully concealed his second family from his mother until her death in 1979. This necessitated what Troughton's son Michael described as annual "performances" when his family visited her at Christmas and Easter. When asked by Michael why he had left the family, Troughton explained, "I needed change. Things have to change all the time for me I'm afraid, that's the way I am." In the 1960s, Troughton was romantically involved with actress Ann Morrish for several years. Troughton married his second wife Shelagh Holdup in 1976 and acquired two stepchildren. The couple lived in Teddington.

Troughton was reluctant to give interviews or make public appearances during his tenure on Doctor Who, and strongly resisted offers to appear on Simon Dee's BBC talk show Dee Time. He once stated: "I think acting is magic. If I tell you all about myself it will spoil it. It's like a conjuror showing you how he does his tricks." In his later years he gave few televised interviews in Britain, saying in 1986: "It's a mistake for a character actor to promote their own personality too much." His son Michael stated in 2001: "I think the worry of exposing both families to the tabloid press was perhaps another reason for his dogged anti-publicity stance throughout his three seasons as the Doctor".

=== Views ===
Troughton detested Christianity as an organised religion.

=== Health and death ===
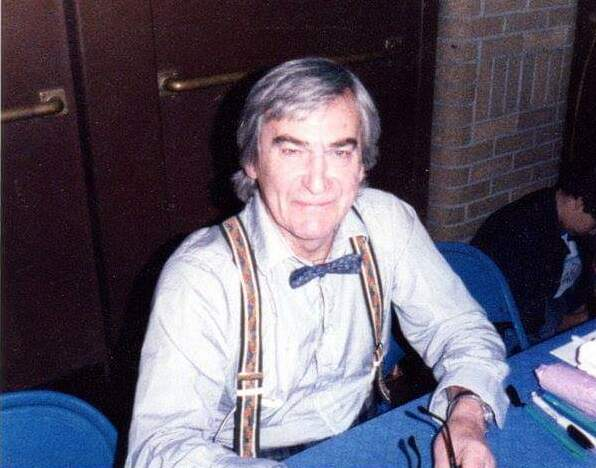
Troughton at a Doctor Who convention in Minneapolis–Saint Paul in October 1986, five months before his death.

Troughton's health was never completely robust due to heavy drinking and smoking (he had quit smoking in the 1960s, but the damage had already been done). Later in his life he refused to accept his doctor's advice after he had developed a serious heart condition through overwork and stress. Troughton suffered two major heart attacks prior to his death, one in late 1978 and the other in 1984, which prevented him from working for several months afterwards. He ignored warnings from his doctors to rest and continued to act prolifically.

In March 1987, Troughton was a guest at the Magnum Opus Con II science fiction convention in Columbus, Georgia, United States. He participated in a Q&A session on 27 March. The following day, 28 March, Troughton ordered breakfast from his hotel room and shortly afterwards suffered a fatal heart attack. He was pronounced dead at the Medical Center (now Piedmont Columbus Regional). After a local cremation, his ashes were flown back to the United Kingdom. During the passage to the United Kingdom, the ashes were mislaid temporarily. This delayed his funeral by a few weeks. His widow, Shelagh, later scattered them beneath a newly planted tree in Bushy Park, a favourite place of Troughton's near to his family home in Teddington.

== Legacy ==
1953 publicity photograph of Troughton as Robin Hood

Troughton's performance as the Doctor has been praised by his successors in the role. Peter Davison, Colin Baker, Sylvester McCoy and Matt Smith have named him as their favourite performer to play the Doctor. David Tennant stated in 2013 that "Troughton created the Doctor as he is now". Doctor Who researcher John Ainsworth credited Troughton's performance for the series' longevity, stating "that there were Eighth and Ninth Doctors and beyond is partly due to the man who first convinced viewers of the Doctor’s ability to change."

A biography written by Troughton's son Michael, titled Patrick Troughton: The Biography of the Second Doctor Who, was published in 2011.

Troughton is portrayed by Reece Shearsmith in the BBC television film An Adventure in Space and Time (2013), which was commissioned to commemorate Doctor Who's 50th anniversary and dramatises the series's production from 1963 to 1966.

Archive footage of Troughton as the Doctor has appeared in the revived series of Doctor Who. In the episode "Robot of Sherwood" (2014), a 1953 production photograph of Troughton as Robin Hood appears among the future depictions of Robin Hood displayed by the Twelfth Doctor to the outlaw.
