= John Vincett =

English cricketer

John Herbert Vincett (24 May 1883 – 28 December 1953) was an English cricketer active from 1907 to 1921 who played for Surrey and Sussex. He was born in Hastings and died in Lambeth. He appeared in 172 first-class matches as a righthanded batsman who bowled right arm medium pace. He scored 3,464 runs with a highest score of 90 not out and took 342 wickets with a best performance of seven for 41.

Prior to his cricket career Vincett had been employed as an apprentice at Ashford railway works and played football for Ashford United, Hastings Rovers, Old Hastonians, St Leonards United, Hastings, Grimsby Town, Leicester Fosse, Barnsley, Hastings & St Leonards, and Tottenham Hotspur.
