= William Troughton =

British actor (born 1984)

William Troughton (born 1984) is a British actor.

== Career ==
Since 2014 he has played the part of Tom Archer in the long-running BBC Radio 4 programme The Archers. His father David Troughton plays Tom's father Tony Archer.

In 2012, he played Harry Robinson in Graham Linehan's play The Ladykillers, based on the 1955 film, in a touring production after understudying in its West End production.

In the 2013 supernatural thriller film Armistice, Troughton played "a demon/mutant/zombie" named in the credits as "The Fallen".

In 2014, he performed Private Peaceful, adapted and directed by Simon Reade from Michael Morpurgo's children's World War I novel, at the Tobacco Factory, Bristol. In 2016 he played Jim / Tom in Clybourne Park at Richmond Theatre.

His television appearances have included Inspector George Gently, Doctors, Silk and The Crimson Field.

== Personal life ==
Troughton's grandfather was Patrick Troughton (1920–1987) who played the Second Doctor in Doctor Who from 1966 to 1969. His brother Sam is also an actor and his brother Jim is a cricketer. Troughton's cousin Harry Melling, a character actor, played Dudley Dursley in the Harry Potter film franchise.

Troughton enjoys playing cricket, as does his character Tom Archer.
