= The Naming of the Dead (Rebus) =

- Rebus episode
- Episode no.: Season 4 Episode 3
- Directed by: Martyn Friend
- Story by: Ian Rankin
- Teleplay by: David Kane
- Original air date: October 2007

Guest appearance
- Ken Stott as John Rebus

Episode chronology
← Previous "The First Stone"	Next → "Knots and Crosses"

"The Naming of the Dead" is a 2007 episode of STV's Rebus television series. It was the third episode broadcast in the show's fourth season, and starred Ken Stott in the title role. The episode was based on the Ian Rankin novel of the same name.

== Plot ==
When a body is found at the site of a top-level conference in Edinburgh, Rebus falls foul of Steelforth, the Special Branch officer leading the protection detail. Later, one of the delegates falls to his death, and Steelforth is keen to have this dismissed as suicide. Rebus finds a link between the second man, a government minister, and an industrialist, Pennen. He also forms a relationship with Stacey Webster, the sister of the second victim. Rebus is determined to uncover the truth, suspecting wrongdoing in high places and a cover-up. However the truth behind the two deaths is revealed to be both simpler and closer to home.

== Cast ==
- Ken Stott as DI John Rebus
- Claire Price as DS Siobhan Clarke
- Nicholas Jones as Commander Steelforth
- Julie Graham as Stacey Webster
- Paul Antony-Barber as Richard Pennen
