= Resurrection Men (Rebus) =

- Rebus episode
- Episode no.: Season 4 Episode 1
- Directed by: Roger Gartland
- Story by: Ian Rankin
- Teleplay by: David Kane
- Original air date: October 2007

Guest appearance
- Ken Stott as John Rebus

Episode chronology
← Previous "Let It Bleed"	Next → "The First Stone"

"Resurrection Men" is a 2007 episode of STV's Rebus television series. It was the first episode broadcast in the show's fourth season, and starred Ken Stott in the title role. The episode was based on the Ian Rankin novel of the same name.

== Plot ==
After a disciplinary incident Rebus is sent on a re-training course. There he falls in with McCulloch and Grey, two detectives involved in a range of corrupt practices, including the fire-bombing of a witness' home. Meanwhile Clarke is investigating the murder of an art dealer in the city. As the cases become entwined, it is revealed Rebus has been working a sting operation against McCulloch and Grey, while the witness takes a grisly revenge.

== Cast ==
- Ken Stott as DI John Rebus
- Claire Price as DS Siobhan Clarke
- Des McAleer as DI Francis Grey
- Jon Morrison as DI Jack McCulloch
- Jamie Michie as Danny Kerr
- Stella Gonet as Cynthia Marber
