= World Soundtrack Award – Best Young Belgian Composer =

Annual Belgian music award

The award for Best Young Belgian Composer is an award given each year at the World Soundtrack Awards. It is given out to commemorate achievement in young Belgian composers. In 2009 and 2010, it was known as the "SABAM Award for Best Young European Composer." It is now known as the "SABAM Award for Best Young International Composer."

== Winners and nominees ==
- 2002: Alex Otterlei
- 2003: Michael Vancraeynest
- 2004: Steven Prengels (for Wekker Tam-Tam)
- 2005: Hannes De Maeyer (for Medor au téléphone)
- 2006: Alexis Koustoulidis (for Le Fauteuil vivant)
- 2007: Werner Viaene (for Belgium, The Movie)
- 2008: Cedric Murrath
- 2009: Christopher Slaski
- 2010: Karzan Mahmood
- 2011: Gabriel Heinrich
- 2012: Valentin Hadjadj
- 2013: Gilles Alonzo
- 2014: Cyril Molesti
- 2015: Peer Kleinschmidt
- 2016: Sándor Török
- 2017: Gavin Brivik
- 2018: Logan Nelson
- 2019: Pierre Charles
- 2020: Ana Kasrashvili
- 2021: Dougal Kemp
- 2022: Giacomo Rita
- 2023: Alec Sievern
- 2024: Florian van der Reijden
- 2025: Ruben De Gheselle
- 2026: Margaret Hermant
