= Strip Jack (Rebus) =

- Rebus episode
- Episode no.: Season 4 Episode 3
- Directed by: Matthew Evans
- Story by: Ian Rankin
- Teleplay by: Robert Murphy
- Original air date: September 2006

Guest appearance
- Ken Stott as John Rebus

Episode chronology
← Previous "A Question of Blood"	Next → "Let It Bleed"

"Strip Jack" is a 2006 episode of STV's Rebus television series. It was the third episode broadcast in the show's third season, and starred Ken Stott in the title role. The episode was based on the Ian Rankin novel of the same name.

== Plot ==
When a brothel is raided, one of those found there is Gregor Jack, a millionaire with a social conscience, and someone Rebus regards as "one of the good guys". Rebus believes he was set up, and unofficially looks into the case. Meanwhile, a woman is murdered near the river, and shortly after, Jack's wife is found murdered in similar circumstances. The answer to the mysteries is found to lie in Jack's past.

== Cast ==
- Ken Stott as DI John Rebus
- Claire Price as DS Siobhan Clarke
- Gary Lewis as Gregor Jack
- Emma Currie as Angela
