= The First Stone (Rebus) =

- Rebus episode
- Episode no.: Season 4 Episode 2
- Directed by: Morag Fullerton
- Story by: Ian Rankin
- Teleplay by: Colin Bateman
- Original air date: October 2007

Guest appearance
- Ken Stott as John Rebus

Episode chronology
| ← Previous "Resurrection Men" | Next → "The Naming of the Dead" |

"The First Stone" is a 2007 episode of STV's Rebus television series. It was the second episode broadcast in the show's fourth season, and starred Ken Stott in the title role. The episode was based on an Ian Rankin short story.

== Plot ==
Rebus is called to investigate the murder of a Church of Scotland minister, whose body is discovered during the General Assembly at which he was to be elected Moderator of the General Assembly of the Church. of Scotland. At first the solution seems straightforward, but Rebus finds there are secrets in the man's past which provide the real explanation.

The script was written by Colin Bateman, and based on a sub-plot in the short story "Atonement" written in 2005 for a collection of short stories by Rankin.

== Cast ==
- Ken Stott as DI John Rebus
- Claire Price as DS Siobhan Clarke
- Ewan Stewart as Michael Walker
- Lorcan Cranitch as Thomas Steele
