= Otterlei =

Otterlei is a surname. Notable people with the surname include:

- Alex Otterlei (born 1968), Belgian composer
- Arve Hans Otterlei (born 1932), Norwegian politician
