= World Soundtrack Awards =

Annual awards for best film music

The World Soundtrack Awards, launched in 2001, are the annual awards for best film music, presented during the Film Fest Gent. The World Soundtrack Academy supports the art of film music through cultural, educational and professional activities. The event takes place yearly in Ghent, Belgium with the ceremony usually at the Capitole Concert Hall.

== Awards ==
- Film Composer of the Year
- Television Composer of the Year
- Best Original Song
- Discovery of the Year
- Game Music Award
- WSA Industry Award
- Public Choice Award
- Lifetime Achievement Award
- Sabam Award for the Best Original Composition by a Young Composer
- Best Original Score for a Belgian Production

== Background ==
The award winners are announced during the annual World Soundtrack Awards Concert & Ceremony. At the concert, Brussels Philharmonic, conducted by Maestro Dirk Brossé, music director of Film Fest Gent, performs a selection of music by the guests of honour and the recipient of the Lifetime Achievement Award.

The official institution behind the WSAwards is the World Soundtrack Academy. The WSAcademy is an international community of screen composers and industry professionals that supports the art of film music through cultural, promotional, educational and professional activities. The WSAcademy promotes film music worldwide through the annual presentation of the WSAwards, as well as through the development of other promotional activities. The WSAcademy supports both emerging and established composers for screen.

Through the organisation of film music seminars, masterclasses, workshops and other activities at Film Fest Gent, the WSAcademy actively contributes to the education and study of this art form. The WSAcademy engages itself in the preservation of the history of film music through recordings, publications and the development of an archive.

The festival is praised as one of the first cultural organizations to turn the spotlight on film music, which gave it the status of a pioneer. It has built up a strong reputation by organizing concerts, such as the very first concert of music by Hans Zimmer.

== Award winners ==
=== 2026 ===
- Film Composer of the Year: Daniel Pemberton for The Bad Guys 2, The Drama, Masters of the Universe, and Project Hail Mary
- Television Composer of the Year: Jeff Russo for Alien: Earth, Cape Fear, and Citadel (season 2)
- Best Original Song: "Golden" from KPop Demon Hunters (written by Ejae, Mark Sonnenblick, Joong Gyu Kwak, Yu Han Lee, Hee Dong Nam, Jeong Hoon Seo, and Teddy Park; performed by Ejae, Audrey Nuna, and Rei Ami)
- Discovery of the Year: Hannah Peel for Midwinter Break
- Public Choice Award: Kevin Smithers for I Am Frankelda
- Game Music Award: Nicolas Garcia for Cthulhu: The Cosmic Abyss
- Belgian Film Composer of the Year: Margaret Hermant for A La Cara: Mallorca Confidencial
- Award for the Best Original Composition by a Young Composer: Xabier Doural García
- Lifetime Achievement Award: Trevor Jones

=== 2025 ===
- Film Composer of the Year: Volker Bertelmann for Conclave and The Amateur
- Television Composer of the Year: Theodore Shapiro for Severance (season 2)
- Best Original Song: "El Mal" from Emilia Perez (written by Clément Ducol, Camille, and Jacques Audiard; performed by Zoe Saldaña and Karla Sofía Gascón)
- Discovery of the Year: Daniel Blumberg for The Brutalist
- Public Choice Award: Laetitia Pansanel-Garric for Hola Frida!
- Game Music Award: Lorien Testard for Clair Obscur: Expedition 33
- Belgian Film Composer of the Year: Ruben De Gheselle for Young Hearts and There Was, There Was Not
- Award for the Best Original Composition by a Young Composer: Bongseop Kim
- Lifetime Achievement Award: Philip Glass and Michael Nyman

=== 2024 ===
- Film Composer of the Year: Jerskin Fendrix for Kinds of Kindness and Poor Things
- Television Composer of the Year: Natalie Holt for Loki (season 2)
- Best Original Song: "What Was I Made For?" from Barbie (written by Billie Eilish and Finneas O'Connell; performed by Billie Eilish)
- Discovery of the Year: Jerskin Fendrix for Poor Things
- Best Original Score for a Belgian Production: Amenra for Skunk
- Sabam Award for Best Original Composition by a Young Composer: Florian van der Reijden
- Public Choice Award: Umberto Scipione for La Guerra dei Nonni
- Game Music Award: Brandon Boone for Slay the Princess
- Lifetime Achievement Award: Elliot Goldenthal
- WSA Industry Award: Maggie Rodford

=== 2023 ===
- Film Composer of the Year: Hauschka for War Sailor, All Quiet on the Western Front, and Memory of Water
- Television Composer of the Year: Nicholas Britell for Andor (season 1) and Succession (season 4)
- Best Original Song: "Your Personal Trash Man Can" from The Marvelous Mrs. Maisel (written by Thomas Mizer and Curtis Moore; performed by Phillip Attmore, Jake Corcoran, RJ Higton, Tommy Sutter & Cast)
- Discovery of the Year: Simon Franglen for Avatar: The Way of Water
- Best Original Score for a Belgian Production: Dirk Brossé for Onze Natuur
- SABAM Award for the Best Original Composition by a Young International Composer: Alec Sievern
- Public Choice Award: Amelia Warner for Mr. Malcolm's List
- Game Music Award: Narayana Johnson for Cult of the Lamb
- Lifetime Achievement Award: Nicola Piovani and Laurence Rosenthal
- WSA Industry Award: Robert Townson

=== 2022 ===
- Film Composer of the Year: Jonny Greenwood for The Power of the Dog and Spencer
- Television Composer of the Year: Nicholas Britell for Succession (season 3)
- Best Original Song: "No Time to Die" from No Time to Die (written by Billie Eilish and Finneas O'Connell; performed by Billie Eilish)
- Discovery of the Year: Eiko Ishibashi for Drive My Car
- Public Choice Award: Joseph Metcalfe, John Coda, and Grant Kirkhope for The King's Daughter
- SABAM Award for the Best Original Composition by a Young International Composer: Giacomo Rita
- Best Original Score for a Belgian Production: The Penelopes for SpaceBoy
- Lifetime Achievement Award: Bruno Coulais
- WSA Industry Award: Catherine Joy for Alliance for Women Film Composers

=== 2021 ===
- Film Composer of the Year: Daniel Pemberton for Rising Phoenix, Enola Holmes, and The Trial of the Chicago 7
- Television Composer of the Year: Carlos Rafael Rivera for The Queen's Gambit and Hacks (season 1)
- Best Original Song: "Call Me Cruella" from Disney's Cruella (Nicholas Britell, Florence Welch, Steph Jones, Jordan Powers, and Taura Stinson)
- Discovery of the Year: Nainita Desai for The Reason I Jump
- Public Choice Award: Benji Merrison for SAS: Red Notice
- Lifetime Achievement Award: Eleni Karaindrou
- SABAM Award for the Best Original Composition by a Young International Composer: Dougal Kemp

=== 2020 ===
- Film Composer of the Year: Hildur Guðnadóttir for Joker
- Television Composer of the Year: Nicholas Britell for Succession (season 2)
- Best Original Song Written Directly for a Film: "Stand Up" from Harriet (Joshuah Brian Campbell and Cynthia Erivo)
- Discovery of the Year: Bryce Dessner for The Two Popes
- Best Original Score for a Belgian Production: Hannes De Maeyer for Torpedo
- Public Choice Award: Alfonso González Aguilar for Klaus
- Lifetime Achievement Award: Gabriel Yared
- SABAM Award for the Most Original Composition by a Young International Composer: Ana Kasrashvili

=== 2019 ===
- Film Composer of the Year: Nicholas Britell for If Beale Street Could Talk and Vice
- Television Composer of the Year: Hildur Guðnadóttir for Chernobyl and Ófærð (Trapped)
- Best Original Song Written Directly for a Film: "Shallow" from A Star is Born (Lady Gaga, Andrew Wyatt, Anthony Rossomando, and Mark Ronson)
- Discovery of the Year: Michael Abels for Us
- Best Original Score for a Belgian Production: Frédéric Vercheval for Duelles (Mothers' Instinct)
- Public Choice Award: John Powell for How to Train Your Dragon: The Hidden World
- Lifetime Achievement Award: Krzysztof Penderecki and Frédéric Devreese
- SABAM Award for the Most Original Composition by a Young International Composer: Pierre Charles

=== 2018 ===
- Film Composer of the Year: Jóhann Jóhannsson for Last and First Men, Mandy, Mary Magdalene (co-composed with Hildur Guðnadóttir), The Butcher, The Whore and the One-Eyed Man, and The Mercy
- Television Composer of the Year: Ramin Djawadi for Game of Thrones (season 7), The Strain (season 4), and Westworld (season 2)
- Best Original Song Written Directly for a Film: "Black Panther" from Black Panther (Kendrick Duckworth, Mark Spears, Kevin Gomringer, Tim Gomringer, and Matt Schaeffer)
- Discovery of the Year: Tamar-kali for Mudbound
- Best Original Score for a Belgian Production: Zagros by Rutger Reinders
- Public Choice Award: Nostalgia (Laurent Eyquem)
- Lifetime Achievement Award: Philippe Sarde
- SABAM Award for the Most Original Composition by a Young International Composer: Logan Nelson

=== 2017 ===
- Film Composer of the Year: Jóhann Jóhannsson for Arrival
- Television Composer of the Year: Rupert Gregson-Williams for The Crown
- Best Original Song Written Directly for a Film: "City of Stars" from La La Land (Justin Hurwitz)
- Discovery of the Year: Nicholas Britell for Moonlight
- Best Original Score for a Belgian Production: Sprakeloos by Jef Neve (film of Hilde Van Mieghem)
- Public Choice Award: Viceroy's House (A.R. Rahman)
- Lifetime Achievement Award: David Shire
- SABAM Award for the Most Original Composition by a Young International Composer: Gavin Brivik

=== 2016 ===
- Film Composer of the Year: Carter Burwell for Carol
- Television Composer of the Year: Jeff Beal for House of Cards
- Best Original Song Written Directly for a Film: "None of Them Are You" from Anomalisa (Charlie Kaufman and Carter Burwell)
- Discovery of the Year: Joe Kraemer for Mission: Impossible – Rogue Nation
- Best Original Score for a Belgian Production: Cafard by Hans Helewaut
- Public Choice Award: Carol (Carter Burwell)
- Lifetime Achievement Award: Ryuichi Sakamoto
- SABAM Award for the Most Original Composition by a Young International Composer: Sándor Török

=== 2015 ===
- Film Composer of the Year: Michael Giacchino for Dawn of the Planet of the Apes, Inside Out, Jupiter Ascending, Jurassic World, and Tomorrowland
- Best Original Film Score of the Year: Birdman (Antonio Sánchez)
- Best Original Song Written Directly for a Film: "The Apology Song" from The Book of Life (Paul Williams and Gustavo Santaolalla)
- Discovery of the Year: Antonio Sánchez for Birdman
- Public Choice Award: The Maze Runner (John Paesano)
- Lifetime Achievement Award: Patrick Doyle
- SABAM Award for the Most Original Composition by a Young International Composer: Peer Kleinschmidt

=== 2014 ===
- Film Composer of the Year: Alexandre Desplat for The Grand Budapest Hotel, Godzilla, The Monuments Men, Venus in Fur, Philomena, Zulu, and Marius
- Best Original Film Score of the Year: The Grand Budapest Hotel (Alexandre Desplat)
- Best Original Song Written Directly for a Film: "Happy" from Despicable Me 2 (Pharrell Williams)
- Discovery of the Year: Daniel Pemberton for Cuban Fury, The Counselor
- Public Choice Award: Marina (Michelino Bisceglia)
- Lifetime Achievement Award: Francis Lai
- SABAM Award for the Most Original Composition by a Young International Composer: Cyril Molesti

=== 2013 ===
- Film Composer of the Year: Mychael Danna
- Best Original Film Score of the Year: Life of Pi (Mychael Danna)
- Best Original Song Written Directly for a Film: "Skyfall" from Skyfall (Adele)
- Discovery of the Year: Dan Romer and Benh Zeitlin
- Public Choice Award: The Butterfly's Dream (Rahman Altin)
- Lifetime Achievement Award: Riz Ortolani
- SABAM Award for the Most Original Composition by a Young International Composer: Gilles Alonzo

=== 2012 ===
- Film Composer of the Year: Alberto Iglesias for Le Moine
- Best Original Film Score of the Year: Tinker, Tailor, Soldier, Spy (Alberto Iglesias)
- Best Original Song Written Directly for a Film: "Lay Your Head Down" from Albert Nobbs (Brian Byrne and Glenn Close)
- Discovery of the Year: Brian Byrne for Albert Nobbs
- Public Choice Award: W.E. (Abel Korzeniowski)
- Lifetime Achievement Award: Pino Donaggio
- SABAM Award for the Most Original Composition by a Young International Composer: Valentin Hadjadj

=== 2011 ===
- Film Composer of the Year: Alexandre Desplat for A Better Life
- Best Original Film Score of the Year: Inception (Hans Zimmer)
- Best Original Song Written Directly for a Film: "We Belong Together" from Toy Story 3 (Randy Newman)
- Discovery of the Year: Alex Heffes for The First Grader
- Public Choice Award: 127 Hours (A. R. Rahman)
- Lifetime Achievement Award: Giorgio Moroder
- SABAM Award for the Most Original Composition by a Young International Composer: Gabriel Heinrich

=== 2010 ===
- Film Composer of the Year: Alexandre Desplat for Julie & Julia
- Best Original Film Score of the Year: Fantastic Mr. Fox (Alexandre Desplat)
- Best Original Song Written Directly for a Film: "The Weary Kind" from Crazy Heart (Ryan Bingham and T-Bone Burnett)
- Discovery of the Year: Abel Korzeniowski for A Single Man
- Public Choice Award: A Single Man (Abel Korzeniowski)
- Lifetime Achievement Award: John Barry
- SABAM Award for the Most Original Composition by a Young International Composer: Karzan Mahmood

=== 2009 ===
- Film Composer of the Year: Alexandre Desplat
- Best Original Film Score of the Year: The Curious Case of Benjamin Button (Alexandre Desplat)
- Best Original Song Written Directly for a Film: "Jai Ho" from Slumdog Millionaire (A. R. Rahman)
- Discovery of the Year: Nico Muhly for The Reader
- Public Choice Award: Twilight (Carter Burwell)
- Lifetime Achievement Award: Marvin Hamlisch
- SABAM Award for the Most Original Composition by a Young International Composer: Christopher Slaski

=== 2008 ===
- Film Composer of the Year: James Newton Howard for Charlie Wilson's War
- Best Original Film Score of the Year: Atonement (Dario Marianelli)
- Best Original Song Written Directly for a Film: "Down to Earth" from WALL-E (Peter Gabriel and Thomas Newman)
- Discovery of the Year: Marc Streitenfeld for American Gangster
- Public Choice Award: Aanrijding in Moscow (Tuur Florizoone)
- Lifetime Achievement Award: Angelo Badalamenti
- SABAM Award for the Most Original Composition by a Young International Composer: Cedric Murrath

=== 2007 ===
- Film Composer of the Year: Alexandre Desplat for The Queen
- Best Original Film Score of the Year: The Fountain (Clint Mansell)
- Best Original Song Written Directly for a Film: "You Know My Name" from Casino Royale (Chris Cornell and David Arnold)
- Discovery of the Year: Daniel Tarrab and Andres Goldstein
- Public Choice Award: The Fountain (Clint Mansell)
- Lifetime Achievement Award: Mikis Theodorakis
- SABAM Award for the Most Original Composition by a Young International Composer: Werner Viaene

=== 2006 ===
- Film Composer of the Year: Alberto Iglesias
- Best Original Film Score of the Year: The Constant Gardener (Alberto Iglesias)
- Best Original Song Written Directly for a Film: "Our Town" from Cars (Randy Newman)
- Discovery of the Year: Evanthia Reboutsika for My Father and My Son
- Public Choice Award: Brokeback Mountain (Gustavo Santaolalla)
- Lifetime Achievement Award: Peer Raben
- SABAM Award for the Most Original Composition by a Young International Composer: Alexis Koustoulidis

=== 2005 ===
- Film Composer of the Year: Angelo Badalamenti for Un long dimanche de fiançailles
- Best Original Film Score of the Year: War of the Worlds (John Williams)
- Best Original Song Written Directly for a Film: "Old Habits Die Hard" from Alfie (Dave Stewart and Mick Jagger)
- Discovery of the Year: Michael Giacchino for The Incredibles
- Public Choice Award: Alexander (Vangelis)
- Lifetime Achievement Award: Jerry Leiber and Mike Stoller
- SABAM Award for the Most Original Composition by a Young International Composer: Hannes De Maeyer

=== 2004 ===
- Film Composer of the Year: Gabriel Yared
- Best Original Film Score of the Year: Cold Mountain (Gabriel Yared)
- Best Original Song Written Directly for a Film: "You Will Be My Ain True Love" from Cold Mountain (Alison Krauss and Sting)
- Discovery of the Year: Gustavo Santaolalla for 21 Grams
- Public Choice Award: Harry Potter and the Prisoner of Azkaban (John Williams)
- Lifetime Achievement Award: Alan Bergman and Marilyn Bergman
- SABAM Award for the Most Original Composition by a Young International Composer: Steven Prengels
- Special Award: Prince and The Revolution for Purple Rain

=== 2003 ===
- Film Composer of the Year: Elliot Goldenthal
- Best Original Film Score of the Year: Frida (Elliot Goldenthal)
- Best Original Song Written Directly for a Film: "The Hands That Built America" from Gangs of New York (William Orbit)
- Discovery of the Year: Antonio Pinto for Cidade de Deus
- Public Choice Award: The Lord of the Rings: The Two Towers (Howard Shore)
- Lifetime Achievement Award: Maurice Jarre
- SABAM Award for the Most Original Composition by a Young International Composer: Michael Vancraeynest

=== 2002 ===
- Film Composer of the Year: Patrick Doyle for Gosford Park
- Best Original Film Score of the Year: The Lord of the Rings: The Fellowship of the Ring (Howard Shore)
- Best Original Song Written Directly for a Film: "If I Didn't Have You" from Monsters, Inc. (Randy Newman)
- Discovery of the Year: Klaus Badelt for The Time Machine
- Public Choice Award: The Lord of the Rings: The Fellowship of the Ring (Howard Shore)
- Lifetime Achievement Award: George Martin
- SABAM Award for the Most Original Composition by a Young International Composer: Alex Otterlei

=== 2001 ===
- Film Composer of the Year: John Williams for Artificial Intelligence: A.I.
- Best Original Film Score of the Year: Amélie (Yann Tiersen)
- Best Original Song Written Directly for a Film: "Come What May" from Moulin Rouge! (David Baerwald and Kevin Gilbert)
- Discovery of the Year: Craig Armstrong for Moulin Rouge!
- Public Choice Award: Artificial Intelligence: A.I. (John Williams)
- Lifetime Achievement Award: Elmer Bernstein

== Film music concerts in Ghent ==
=== 2023 ===
- WSA Concert (Laurence Rosenthal, Eiko Ishibashi, and Nicola Piovani)
- PRESS PLAY: Music in Games
- Eiko Ishibashi plays 'GIFT'
- Colin Stetson plays 'Soundtracks' & première 'GUT'

=== 2022 ===
- WSA Concert (Nainita Desai, Mark Isham, and Bruno Coulais)
- Korean Composers

=== 2021 ===
- WSA Concert (Bryce Dessner, Max Richter, and Eleni Karaindrou)
- Great Greek Composers

=== 2020 ===
- WSA Concert: 20th Anniversary – Tribute to the Film Composer

=== 2019 ===
- WSA Concert (Marco Beltrami, Tamar-kali, and Frédéric Devreese)
- Hollywood Nightmares: Scary Symphonic Scores

=== 2018 ===
- WSA Concert (Carter Burwell, Philippe Sarde, and Nicholas Britell)
- 2001 and Beyond: A Symphonic Odyssey

=== 2017 ===
- WSA Concert (David Shire, Terence Blanchard & Joe Kraemer)
- Symphonic Jazz Concert

=== 2016 ===
- WSA Concert (Ryuichi Sakamoto, Jeff Beal, Jeff Russo, Sean Callery, and Daniel Pemberton)
- TV Themes Concert

=== 2015 ===
- WSA Concert (Alan Silvestri and Daniel Pemberton)
- Great British Film Music

=== 2014 ===
- WSA Concert (Cliff Martinez, Dan Romer, Francis Lai, and Jef Neve)
- Nino Rota in Concert
- Charlie Chaplin's The Circus

=== 2013 ===
- WSA Concert (Alexandre Desplat and Riz Ortolani)
- Scoring for Scorsese
- 40 Years of Film Fest Gent
- The 7th Heaven Live by Kevin Toma

=== 2012 ===
- WSA Concert (James Newton Howard and Pino Donaggio)
- 007 in Concert
- The B-Movie Orchestra
- Ennio Morricone Concerto

=== 2011 ===
- WSA Concert (Hans Zimmer, Elliot Goldenthal, Howard Shore, and Giorgio Moroder)
- Maestros of Suspense (Bernard Herrmann and Franz Waxman)

=== 2010 ===
- WSA Concert (Angelo Badalamenti, Howard Shore, Gustavo Santaolalla, Stephen Warbeck, Craig Armstrong, and Elliot Goldenthal)
- John Barry Tribute Concert
- Koyaanisqatsi in Concert

=== 2009 ===
- WSA Concert (Alexandre Desplat, Marvin Hamlisch, and Marc Streitenfeld)
- Shigeru Umebayashi in Concert
- Divine Féminin: Alexandre Desplat en het Traffic Quintet
- Jef Neve Trio

=== 2008 ===
- WSA Concert (Dario Marianelli, Angelo Badalamenti, and Tuur Florizoone)
- John Williams Tribute Concert
- Folk Music in Film – Kadril in Concert
- Clint Mansell in Concert
- Tribute to Anthony Minghella – Gabriel Yared in Concert

=== 2007 ===
- WSA Concert (Mychael Danna, Evanthia Reboutsika, and Harry Gregson-Williams)
- Alberto Iglesias in concert
- Bajofondo Tango Club + Gustavo Santaolalla in Concert

=== 2006 ===
- WSA Concert (John Powell, Michael Giacchino, and Peer Raben)
- Craig Armstrong Film Works
- Harry Potter Meets Wim Mertens

=== 2005 ===
- WSA Concert (Rachel Portman, Jerry Leiber en Mike Stoller, and Gustavo Santaolalla)
- Polish Composers in Concert (Zbigniew Preisner, Wojciech Kilar, Jan A.P. Kaczmarek, Bronisław Kaper, and Christopher Komeda e.a.)

=== 2004 ===
- WSA Concert (Elmer Bernstein, David Raksin, Michael Kamen, and Wim Mertens)
- Jerry Goldsmith Tribute Concert
- The Lord of the Rings Symphony in Six Movements – conducted by Howard Shore

=== 2003 ===
- WSA Concert (Patrick Doyle and Hooverphonic)
- Film Music Concert by Raymond van het Groenewoud
- Fotogramma: Nicola Piovani conducts Orchestra Aracoeli

=== 2002 ===
- WSA Concert: Fenton-Delerue: A Film Music Celebration
- As Time Goes By: Roby Lakatos
- Jizo and Other Concert Works by Film Composers
- Yann Tiersen in Concert

=== 2001 ===
- WSA Concert (Gabriel Yared and Elmer Bernstein)
- Falling: The Concert featuring Praga Khan

=== 2000 ===
- Hans Zimmer Live in Concert
- Ennio Morricone Live in Ghent

=== 1999 ===
- Film Music at the Opera (Stephen Warbeck, Jean-Claude Petit, Elliot Goldenthal, and Frédéric Devreese)

=== 1998 ===
- The Birth of a Score II (Michael Kamen, Edward Shearmur, Loek Dikker, Dirk Brossé, and Elmer Bernstein)

=== 1997 ===
- The Birth of a Score I (Dirk Brossé, Frédéric Devreese, Leonard Rosenman, and Jean-Claude Petit)

=== 1995 ===
- Pietro Mascagni in Concert

=== 1994 ===
- A Tribute to Georges Delerue - Classical Music in Film II

=== 1993 ===
- A Tribute to Bernard Hermann – Classical Music in Film I

=== 1992 ===
- Music from Films by Derek Jarman (Simon Fisher Turner)

=== 1991 ===
- Michael Nyman in Concert

=== 1989 ===
- Film Music in Europe (Frédéric Devreese, Dirk Brossé, Nicola Piovani, Peer Raben, Stanley Myers, and Lukas Karitinos)

=== 1988 ===
- A Night of Great Film Music (Frédéric Devreese, Georges Delerue, Bruce Broughton, David Newman, and Jean-Claude Petit)
- Toots Thielemans Film Music Concert

=== 1987 ===
- A Night to Remember: Ennio Morricone

=== 1985 ===
- A Tribute to Nino Rota
