= John Price (cricketer, born 1908) =

English cricketer

Cricket information
- Batting: Right-handed
- Bowling: Right arm fast-medium

Career statistics
Competition	First-class
Matches	11
Runs scored	81
Batting average	5.78
100s/50s	0/0
Top score	33
Balls bowled	968
Wickets	12
Bowling average	50.83
5 wickets in innings	0
10 wickets in match	0
Best bowling	2/35
Catches/stumpings	4/–
- Source: CricketArchive, 29 December 2021

John Price (6 July 1908 – March 1995) was an English first-class cricketer who played 11 matches for Worcestershire in the late 1920s. He had the unwanted distinction of never playing in a winning side in his entire first-class career.

He made his debut against the New Zealanders in early June 1927, dismissing opener Jack Mills in both innings. In three County Championship games later that season, he took a further four wickets, all in two matches against Somerset, with a career-best return of 2–35 in the first of these. (Worcestershire lost both games by an innings, however.)

In 1928 Price played three times, all in the Championship, but could manage only two wickets, although he did make his best score of 33 against Derbyshire in early August. The following year he had another two outings, but again managed only a pair of wickets, his last victim in first-class cricket being Hampshire's Jack Newman, the only man other than Mills he dismissed twice in his career.

Price was born in the Shrub Hill region of Worcester; he died aged 86 in the same city.

His uncle Ted Arnold also played for Worcestershire and appeared in ten Tests for England, while his brother William played once for Worcestershire in 1923.

His granddaughter, Claire Price, is the actress who plays DS Siobhan Clarke in ITV's Rebus.
