= Drinking and Driving Wrecks Lives =

British public information film series

Drinking and Driving Wrecks Lives is the tagline to a series of public information films (PIFs) that ran in the UK between 1987 and 1997 as part of the Government's Safety on the Move road safety campaign, addressing the problem of drink-driving.

== Background ==
Unlike earlier campaigns which focused on consequences to the offender, this campaign was more aimed at showing the devastation that drink-driving can cause to the victims and their families, intending to produce an emotional response from the viewer. The films were primarily targeted towards young working-class men, who were most likely to be convicted of drink driving, and aimed for the practice to become socially unacceptable.

== Films ==
The campaign included several different films:

- Jenny (c. 1987) showed a mother travelling home from hospital having visited her daughter, Jenny, who was the victim of a drink-driving accident and now in a vegetative state in a coma. Jenny's mother says she tries to visit her every day and reads to her sometimes, and hopes one day she will emerge from the coma but the doctors and nurses at hospital say the likelihood is very slim. The advert ends with Jenny's bedroom looking exactly as it did before the accident.
- Classmates (1987) depicted a class of children in a school during register call. The camera is shown moving from row to row of children who share their thoughts about the death of a classmate who died in a drink-driving accident. The camera stopped on a close friend of the deceased and the now-empty chair next to it.
- Victim (1987) showed a man in a wheelchair on a day out to the pier. He talks about a drink-driving accident he was in and says he is lucky to be alive. His friend accompanying him helps him drink a cup of coffee.
- A Fireman's Tale (c. 1987) depicted a firefighter, played by Ken Stott, giving an account of a crash scene he attended, in which a mother and baby were killed by a drunk driver. He said she looked somewhat like his sister. The last thing he said was, "I don't know how he'll ever live with himself", before cutting to the tagline "Drinking and Driving Wrecks Lives".
- Real Lives, narrated by John Nettles, depicted a family whose 19-year-old son has just died as a result of a drink driving accident. The film shows newspaper clippings about the young boy's death and footage of his funeral, in addition to his grieving family and 12-year-old brother. His parents are then shown clearing out what had been his bedroom, and they break down in tears as they find his watch.
- Recovery showed a man trying to learn to walk again in a physiotherapy session using handrails after being in a drink-driving accident. The physiotherapist gives much encouragement but halfway through the session he asks the physiotherapist to stop because he is finding it too painful.
- Poem showed a woman being woken by the police informing her that her daughter had been killed in a car crash caused by her boyfriend who had been drinking, as the daughter reads a poem detailing her thoughts in her final moments and asking why she should die when she was not at fault.
- Police Station (1991) showed a drink-driver being taken to the police station following a car crash and then going through the relevant procedures (including having a blood sample taken). It focuses on how intimidating the arrest is. A police officer tells the culprit that the victim of the accident is now dead, whilst another police officer offers him a cup of tea, with obvious agitated intonation.
- Kathy Can't Sleep (1991) showed a crying girl whose father had killed a boy (thought to be a classmate) by drink driving, while her mother scolded him off-camera. This was to illustrate that drink driving was harmful to society as a whole, rather than only the individuals involved. The ad was only allowed to be shown after 9pm to avoid upsetting children.
- Eyes (1992) showed a young woman (played by Denise van Outen) injured in a car accident. As EMTs attempt to revive her, the driver's arrest is heard in the background, before the EMTs pronounce her dead.
- In the Summertime (1992) featured a group of friends drinking outside in a pub's beer garden during the summer (accompanied by the Mungo Jerry song of the same name) before departing the pub in a MK3 Vauxhall Cavalier. A pub patron soon loses his smile when he sees something shocking, switching on cue to the scene of a fatal car accident the Cavalier was involved in, showing the occupants dead. An altered tagline was used here, "In the summertime, drinking and driving wrecks even more lives".
- Pudding (1993) featured a young woman having gone to her family for Christmas dinner; when a family member questioned her partner's absence she explained he would be coming later as he had stopped for a quick drink at his sister's house en route. At that point a blazing Christmas pudding is brought out and then the phone rings which the woman answers, the police are on the other end and explain her partner had been killed in a car crash. The Christmas pudding morphs on cue into a MK2 Vauxhall Astra, thought to be her partner's car, which then catches fire due to the impact of the crash. A slightly altered tag line was used here, Drinking and driving wrecks Christmas.
- Dave (1995) featured a young man (played by Daniel Ryan) paralysed following a drink driving accident, accompanied by voices of his friends encouraging him to have another drink but refusing saying he was driving, whilst his mother prepares his dinner in the blender. This was made for the Christmas period as there are Christmas decorations in the background. The advert then zooms out to his mother attempting to spoon feed him liquidised Christmas dinner, saying "Come on, Dave, just have one more". It won a British Television Advertising Award in 1996.
- Mirror (1996) featured a woman looking into the mirror on her dressing table whilst removing her make-up, presumably following a date night. She describes her boyfriend, Nick, who she had got in the car with not because he was drunk (even though he was), but instead because they are a couple. Beneath the make up lies the woman's scars from a drink-driving accident, which are slowly revealed as she describes more about Nick, who turns out to only be with her due to fear of being shunned by other people on account of what happened. The screen cuts to black, with the text "If you're out for a drink, leave the car at home", with the Drinking and Driving Wrecks Lives logo below.
- Mates was from the perspective of a drink-driving victim, who was drifting in and out of consciousness in a hospital bed with his mate (the driver) pleading innocence and asking how he is whilst medics are trying to treat his injuries. The advert ended with a black screen that read “Drinking and driving wrecks lives.” Then, it cut back to the driver talking to his mate, as he asked: “We're still mates, aren’t we?"
- Mark (c. 1997) showed a man talking about his best mate Mark, who is ostensibly a "great bloke" but after a night out where he had "only a couple of drinks" he caused an accident which killed a couple, leaving their children orphaned. This challenged public perceptions about having to be drunk to cause a collision.

Storylines and camera techniques (such as the extreme close ups used in the Eyes and Kathy campaigns) were designed to encourage drinking drivers to identify with the people affected by this behaviour, showing that drink driving is not a "victimless crime".

== Response ==
The campaigns were mostly shown on television advertising, and as posters on public buildings, and generated a considerable amount of press interest. It was a success, and by January 1988, convictions for driving over the limit had fallen to a new low, considerably beyond expectations. The Department of Transport also noted a corresponding drop in road traffic casualties.

The campaign was replaced in 1997 by a new slogan, "Have none for the road". Drink driving related deaths fell from 1,640 in 1979 to 230 in 2012.
