= Jodie Hamblet =

British TV actress

- Occupation: Actress
- Known for: Appearing as Gemma Davenport in Coronation Street; Starring in Home Fires

Jodie Hamblet is a British TV actress; she is best known for her appearance in the soap opera Coronation Street as Gemma Davenport.

She made her debut aged 14 in Linda Green and later had roles in Coronation Street, Life On Mars and Shameless. She went on to play Vicky in the second series of My Mad Fat Diary.

In 2015, Hamblet first appeared as the vicious telephone operator Jenny Marshall in Home Fires. Hamblet appeared in the first series a minor character and then returned as Jenny once again in Series 2 with her character being even more vicious and nosy than either. The first series of Home Fires was met with great acclaim from high views being recommissioned for a second series ITV.

== Filmography ==
Name	Year	Character	Notes
Coronation Street	2018	Rose	Guest Role (1 Episode)
Home Fires	2015 - 2016	Jenny Marshall	Recurring Role in Series 1 Main Role in Series 2
My Mad Fat Diary	2014	Victoria	Recurring Role (4 Episodes)
Shameless	2012	Gemma	Guest Role (1 Episode)
Shameless	2008	Sarah Berry	Guest Role (2 Episodes)
Moving On	2010	Lou	Guest Role in Episode "I am Darleen Fyles"
DCI Banks	2010	Bernadette	Guest Role in Episode "Aftermath: Part 1"
Life on Mars	2007	School Girl	Guest Role
Coronation Street	2004-2005	Gemma Davenport	6 Episodes
Linda Green	2001 - 2002	Leanne Fenton	4 Episodes
