= David Eldridge (dramatist) =

British screenwriter (born 1973)

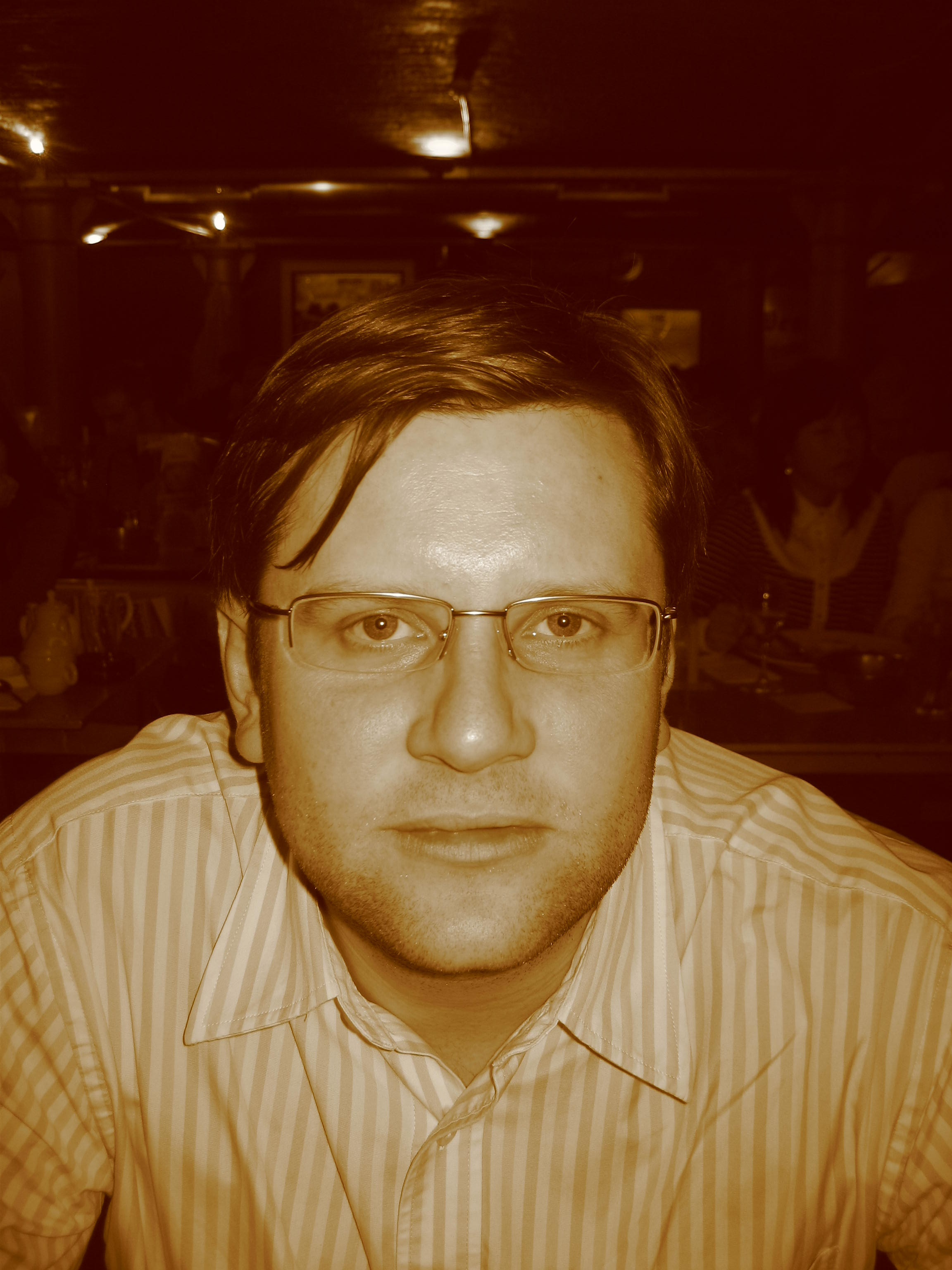
- Eldrige in London, 2006
- Born: 20 September 1973 (age 52); Romford, Greater London, England
- Education: Brentwood School (Essex); University of Exeter
- Occupations: Playwright, screenwriter, educator
- Years active: 1995–present

David Eldridge (born 20 September 1973) is a British dramatist and screenwriter, born in Romford, Greater London, United Kingdom. His plays have been produced in the West End and on Broadway. He has written for stage, screen and radio.

== Career ==
His plays have been performed at major new writing institutions in the UK, including The Royal Court Theatre, the Bush Theatre, the Finborough Theatre and the National Theatre. His stage adaptation of the film Festen transferred from the Almeida Theatre to the West End and Broadway. His play Market Boy, informed by his childhood working on a stall at Romford Market, played at the National Theatre's largest space, the Olivier in June 2006. In July 2008 his play Under the Blue Sky was revived at the Duke of York's Theatre starring Chris O'Dowd, Catherine Tate and Francesca Annis.

In March 2011 his play The Knot of the Heart played at the Almeida Theatre and starred Lisa Dillon, for whom the role of Lucy was written and in February 2012 his play In Basildon, played at the Royal Court Theatre directed by Dominic Cooke starring Linda Bassett and Ruth Sheen. Both plays opened to critical acclaim. The Knot of the Heart received the 2012 Offie for Best New Play and In Basildon was voted The Guardian Theatre Critics and Arts Writers No.1 Theatre of 2012. In April 2012 the Royal Exchange Theatre presented his new version of Miss Julie by August Strindberg, starring Maxine Peake. In July 2014 his play Holy Warriors played at Shakespeare's Globe.

David's screenplay for a ninety-minute single film, The Scandalous Lady W, based upon Hallie Rubenhold's book Lady Worsley's Whim, was broadcast on BBC2 in August 2015 starring Natalie Dormer and directed by Sheree Folkson.

In October 2017 The National Theatre presented the world premiere of his play Beginning in the Dorfman Theatre directed by Polly Findlay. Beginning transferred from The National Theatre to the Ambassadors Theatre in the West End, opening in January 2018 with both Sam Troughton and Justine Mitchell reprising their original roles. Beginning was revived for a tour starting at the Queen's Theatre, Hornchurch, in 2021. It became the first in his trilogy of plays about love and relationships for the National Theatre to be premièred in its Dorfman Theatre. The second, Middle, had its first performances rescheduled to start in April 2022 due to the Covid-19 pandemic. The final play in the trilogy, End, had its first performance at the National Theatre in 2025.

Eldridge is currently lecturer in Creative Writing at Birkbeck, University of London. He also teaches screenwriting for the Arvon Foundation.

== Plays ==
- Cabbage for Tea, Tea, Tea! (Exeter University, 1995)
- Sideways Moving (Edinburgh Fringe, 1995)
- Fighting for Breath (Finborough Theatre, 1995)
- Serving It Up (Bush Theatre, 1996)
- Dirty (Theatre Royal Stratford East, 1996)
- A Week with Tony (Finborough Theatre, 1996)
- Summer Begins (Donmar Warehouse, 1997)
- Thanks Mum (Red Room/Battersea Arts Centre, 1998)
- Falling (Hampstead Theatre, 1999)
- Under the Blue Sky (Royal Court Theatre, 2000)
- Killers (BBC Television, 2000)
- Michael & Me (BBC Radio 4, 2001)
- The Nugget Run (Short Film, 2002)
- Stratford, Ilford, Romford and All Stations to Shenfield (BBC Radio 4, 2003)
- M.A.D. (Bush Theatre, 2004)
- Incomplete and Random Acts of Kindness (Royal Court Theatre, 2005)
- Market Boy (National Theatre, 2006)
- The Picture Man (BBC Radio 3, 2008)
- The List (Arcola Theatre, 2009)
- A Thousand Stars Explode in the Sky (written with Simon Stephens and Robert Holman), (Lyric Hammersmith, 2010)
- Like Minded People (BBC Radio 4, 2011)
- The Knot of the Heart (Almeida Theatre, 2011)
- The Secret Grief (BBC Radio 3, 2011)
- The Stock Da'wa (Hampstead Theatre, 2011)
- Something, Someone, Somewhere (Sixty Six Project/Bush Theatre/Westminster Abbey, 2011; inspired by 1 John)
- In Basildon (Royal Court Theatre, 2012)
- Holy Warriors (Shakespeare's Globe 2014)
- Jenny Lomas (BBC Radio 3, 2017)
- Beginning (National Theatre, 2017)
- Middle (National Theatre, 2022)
- End (National Theatre, 2025)

== Adaptations/Versions ==
- Festen - adaptation of the Dogme film (Almeida Theatre/Lyric Theatre, 2004 / Music Box Theatre, New York, 2006)
- Our Hidden Lives - television adaptation of a book by Simon Garfield (BBC Television, 2005)
- The Wild Duck - new version of a play by Henrik Ibsen (Donmar Warehouse, 2006)
- John Gabriel Borkman - new version of a play by Henrik Ibsen (Donmar Warehouse, 2007)
- Babylone adaptation of the play Rue de Babylone by Jean-Marie Besset (Belgrade Theatre Coventry, 2009)
- The Lady from the Sea - new version of a play by Henrik Ibsen (Royal Exchange Theatre, Manchester, 2010)
- Miss Julie - new version of a play by August Strindberg (Royal Exchange Theatre, Manchester, 2012)
- The Scandalous Lady W - screenplay based upon Hallie Rubenhold's book Lady Worsley's Whim (BBC2, 2015)
- The Spy Who Came in from the Cold - adaptation of the novel by John le Carré at the Minerva Theatre

== Bibliography ==
- Plays: One (Serving It Up/Summer Begins/Under the Blue Sky/M.A.D) (Methuen, 2005) ISBN 0-413-77509-7
- Plays: Two (Incomplete and Random Acts of Kindness/Market Boy/The Knot of the Heart/The Stock Da'wa) (Methuen, 2012) ISBN 978-1-4081-6483-9
- Short Story: (A Whole New World) (Metheun)
