= Daniel Ryan (actor) =

English actor

- Born: Daniel O'Brien; 1968 (age 57–58); Culcheth, Lancashire, England
- Occupations: Actor, writer

Daniel Ryan (born 1968 as Daniel O'Brien) is an English actor and writer. He is known for starring as Darren Alexander in the BBC drama comedy Linda Green, Andrew Gilligan in The Government Inspector, Andy Coulson in Steel River Blues and Kenny Reed in The Whistleblowers. His stage credits include Macbeth, A Midsummer Night's Dream and Richard III. Since 2019, he has played DI Tony Manning in The Bay.

== Early life ==
Ryan was born in Culcheth near Warrington, Cheshire to parents who owned a bingo hall. He and his younger brother attended Culcheth High School. Despite playing in a school band called Darker Than Shark he was enthused by a RADA-educated drama teacher. He attended the Lancashire Schools Arts Workshop in North Wales, before being accepted into LAMDA.

== Career ==
On graduation, he joined the Royal Shakespeare Company on an 18-month contract. In 1995 he played a paralysed man in a Drinking and Driving Wrecks Lives advert. Ten years after graduation, he played the part of Bottom in A Midsummer Night's Dream at RSC in 1999/2000. He has also starred in both Fallout and Posh at the Royal Court Theatre, and was in Mammals at the BushTheatre and later on tour. In 2008 he appeared in Gethsemane, a new play by David Hare at the National Theatre.

In 1992 Ryan played Jamie Hunter who takes revenge on travellers when they befriend his fiancee in series 1 episode 8 of Heartbeat called "Outsiders". Ryan played Andy in the 2001 ITV drama Bob & Rose. In December 2007, he appeared in the Series 17 episode of Heartbeat called "Touch and Go", in which he played Max Philpott who murdered long running character PC Phil Bellamy. He appeared on the Teen Drama Skins as the father of the third generation character Rich Hardbeck in 2011 and 2012. He took over the role of Harry (Sandy's husband, previously played by David Michaels) in the special reunion episodes of BBC sitcom As Time Goes By alongside Judi Dench and Geoffrey Palmer. Ryan also appeared in the 2008 Doctor Who episode "Midnight". He played Felix Sansome in "Wild Justice", S5:E2 of Lewis, which aired April 2011. In 2012, he appeared as antagonist Barry Flint in The Girl Who Lived, the fourth episode of the ninth season of New Tricks.

In 2014, he appeared in Salting the Battlefield as Bill Catcheside. He is also known for playing the role of Dan in the Sky Living comedy-drama Mount Pleasant since 2011. In 2015 he appeared as Steve Baker in S7:E1 of Doc Martin, and as Colonel Anthony Forbes-Leith in the BBC TV series Father Brown episode 3.9 "The Truth in the Wine". He has played Welsh butcher Bryn Brindsley in the ITV war-time drama Home Fires from 2015. In 2018 he starred in the ITV mini-series Innocent, as the lead character's brother, Phil Collins. In February 2019 he played Gerald Baynes in Death in Paradise S8.E8. Also in February he appeared as Alec Sidden in The Seagull, S9:E4 of Vera, and in April 2019 as Detective Inspector Anthony 'Tony' Manning in The Bay.

In 2022 he played Gary in Middle at the National Theatre.

In 2022 he portrayed DAC Peter Clarke (Metropolitan Police) in the four part ITV series Litvinenko.

He played Steve Holland, assistant manager of the England men's football team, in the 2026 BBC One drama miniseries Dear England, also appearing as Prison Officer Freddie Jennings in the third series of Jimmy McGovern's prison drama Time for the same channel later that year.
