= Ted Arnold =

English cricketer

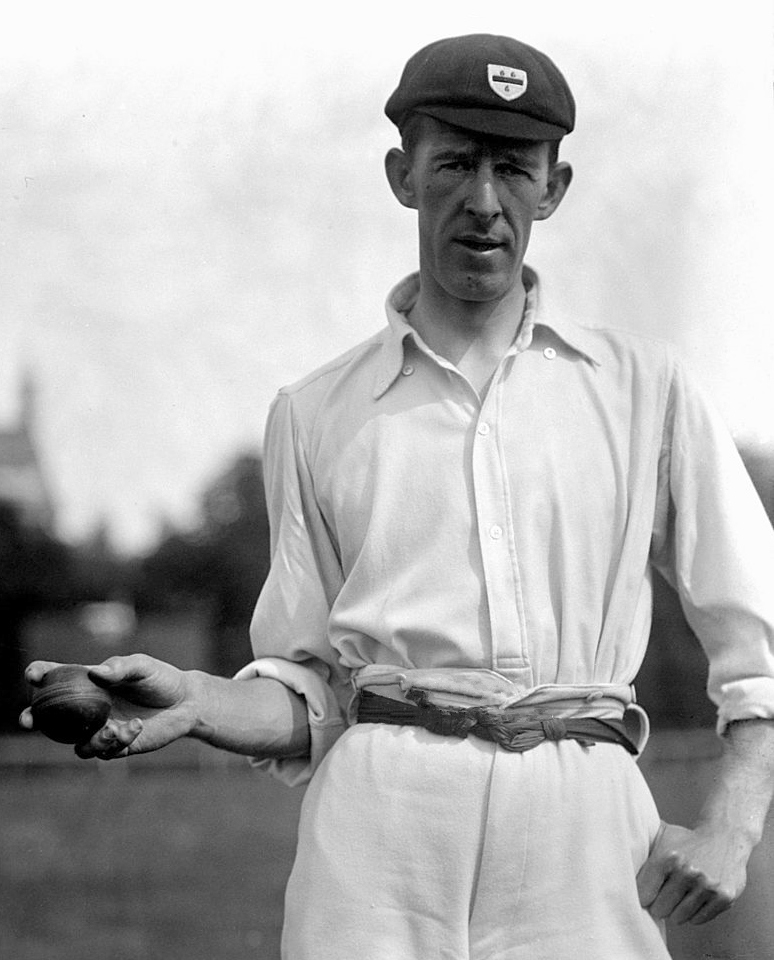

Personal information
- Born: 7 November 1876; Withycombe Raleigh, Devon, England
- Died: 25 October 1942 (aged 66); Worcester, England
- Batting: Right-handed
- Bowling: Right-arm medium-fast

International information
- National side: England
- Test debut: 11 December 1903 v Australia
- Last Test: 29 July 1907 v South Africa

Career statistics
Competition	Test	First-class
Matches	10	343
Runs scored	160	15,853
Batting average	13.33	29.91
100s/50s	0/0	24/76
Top score	40	215
Balls bowled	1,677	55,046
Wickets	31	1069
Bowling average	25.41	23.16
5 wickets in innings	1	63
10 wickets in match	0	13
Best bowling	5/37	9/64
Catches/stumpings	8/–	187/–
- Source: CricInfo, 20 August 2021

Edward George Arnold (7 November 1876 – 25 October 1942) was an English cricketer who played in ten Test Matches from 1903 to 1907, and most of his 343 first-class matches for Worcestershire between 1899 and 1913. His Wisden obituary described him as "an allround cricketer of sterling merit".

His Cricinfo profile, meanwhile, declares that "More than any other player, Arnold was responsible for the elevation of Worcestershire to first-class status." With his eighteen tons and well nigh 1,000 wickets in the County Championship, "his adopted county [... could] take on any opponent". Arnold bowled at upwards of medium pace, with variations, and seamed the ball consistently. He took full toll advantage of his physical stature, bowling with an upright action and, like Bill Bowes, obtaining considerable lift off the wicket. This was an especially effective ploy on wickets afflicted by rain. He swung the ball substantially, especially away from the bat.

Arnold was a slips fieldsman and the only batsman who put up a fight when his team fell for 43 against Yorkshire in 1900.

He was a member of three Test series-winning England teams, the most noteworthy of which came under the captaincy of Plum Warner in 1903–04, a series he kicked off with the removal of openers Reggie Duff and Victor Trumper before the score had reached double figures. He also contributed a great deal to the Fourth-Test victory: although dismissed for a pair, he took four wickets in the first innings and dismissed Trumper twice.

His nephews John Price and William Price both had brief first-class careers with Worcestershire.
