= Polly Findlay =

British theatre director

- Born: London, UK
- Education: Exeter College, Oxford; LAMDA
- Occupation: Theatre director
- Years active: 2005–present
- Agent(s): Cassarotto Ram & Associates
- Spouse: Marc Tritschler
- Children: 1
- Awards: Olivier Award for Best Entertainment 2011 JMK Award 2007
- Website: casarotto.co.uk/clients/polly-findlay

Polly Findlay is an Olivier Award winning British theatre and film director. She has directed eight productions for the National Theatre, and four for the Royal Shakespeare Company, where she is an associate artist. She has also directed numerous productions at the Donmar, the Bridge, and the Almeida.

She directed her first feature film, Midwinter Break, for Film4 and Focus Features, starring Lesley Manville and Ciarán Hinds, which will have a theatrical release in spring 2026. She has written a feature film for BBC Films, which will be shooting in 2026.

She is an honorary fellow of Exeter College, Oxford.

== Early life ==
Findlay grew up in Wandsworth, her mother working in charity and her father as a legal journalist. Findlay was a successful child actor, starting with a small part in an RSC play at the age of 12 and undertaking a professional job a year until she went to University.

== Education and Training ==
Findlay studied English at Exeter College, University of Oxford, from 2001 to 2004, then completed post-graduate training in directing at LAMDA. In 2006, she trained on the Directors' Course at the National Theatre Studio. Findlay was the recipient of the Bulldog Princeps Bursary Award from 2006 to 2007, and in 2007, she won the James Menzies-Kitchin Trust's Young Theatre Director award. She has since worked in major venues across the UK and in Europe.

== Career ==
In the years following her training, Findlay directed productions at the Arcola Theatre, Bush Theatre, and the Lyric Hammersmith.

Critically acclaimed productions include Sophocles' Antigone on the Olivier Stage at the National Theatre in 2011, Shakespeare's The Merchant of Venice for the Royal Shakespeare Company in 2015. Findlay's production of David Eldridge's new play Beginning opened at the National Theatre in October 2017 and transferred to the Ambassadors Theatre in the West End in January 2018. In 2018, she directed an adaptation of The Prime of Miss Jean Brodie at the Donmar, and in 2019, a production of Rutherford and Son at the National Theatre. In 2020, Findlay directed Caryl Churchill's A Number at the Bridge Theatre, and in 2021, she directed Suzan-Lori Parks's play White Noise at the same venue. In 2022 she directed Middle by David Eldridge at the National Theatre.; in 2023 she directed Assassins at Chichester Festival Theatre; and in 2024 she directed Kendall Feaver’s Alma Mater at the Almeida.

She is the director of three Grayson Perry shows, which toured nationally in 2021, 2023 and 2025.

Findlay has also directed in Germany, Denmark and Croatia.
