= William Price (Worcestershire cricketer) =

English cricketer

Cricket information
- Batting: Right-handed
- Bowling: Right arm fast-medium

Career statistics
Competition	First-class
Matches	1
Runs scored	0
Batting average	–
100s/50s	0/0
Top score	0*
Balls bowled	18
Wickets	0
Bowling average	–
5 wickets in innings	–
10 wickets in match	–
Best bowling	–
Catches/stumpings	0/–
- Source: Cricinfo, 29 December 2021

William Harry Price (28 May 1900 – 15 April 1982) was an English first-class cricketer who played a single first-class match, for Worcestershire against Glamorgan at Cardiff Arms Park in 1923. His influence on the game was almost non-existent: he made 0 not out in his only innings, bowled three wicketless overs for 12 runs and did not hold a catch.

Price was born in the Shrub Hill area of Worcester, and died aged 81 in the same city.

He was the nephew of Ted Arnold, who also played for Worcestershire and appeared in ten Tests for England, and the brother of John Price, who played a handful of games for Worcestershire later in the 1920s.
