= Ewan Stewart =

Scottish actor (born 1957)

- Born: Andrew Ewan Stewart; 26 August 1957 (age 69); Glasgow, Scotland
- Education: Clifton Hall School; Merchiston Castle School
- Occupation: Actor
- Years active: 1979–present
- Spouse: Clare Byam-Shaw
- Children: 2
- Parent(s): Andy Stewart; Sheila Stewart

Andrew Ewan Stewart (born 26 August 1957) is a Scottish film, television and stage actor. He is best known for his role as First Officer Murdoch in Titanic (1997) and Only Fools and Horses as Dr Robbie Meadows.

== Early life ==
Stewart was born in Glasgow, and is the son of the late Scottish entertainer Andy Stewart. His mother Sheila lives in Arbroath, Scotland. Stewart was educated at Edinburgh's Clifton Hall School and Merchiston Castle School from 1966 to 1974. He left Scotland to move to London in 1975 and started working in theatres as well as studying drama.

== Career ==
Stewart's first television appearance was in an advertisement for Scottish "Bluebell" matches. His first major TV appearance was in 1979 in the TV remake of All Quiet on the Western Front, with Richard Thomas and Ernest Borgnine. In 1989, Stewart played Dr Robbie Meadows on the sitcom Only Fools and Horses.

Stewart played First Officer Murdoch in Titanic (1997). In 2005, Stewart was one of many European actors considered for the vacant role of James Bond. In 2008, Stewart starred in the film Ecstasy based on The Undefeated from Irvine Welsh's best-selling novel Ecstasy: Three Tales of Chemical Romance.

Stewart was the voice actor and motion caption actor for Shen in the video game Heavenly Sword, released in 2007.

== Personal life ==
Stewart lives in London with his wife, English actress Clare Byam-Shaw, and has two children.

== Filmography ==
=== Film ===
Year	Title	Role	Ref.
1979	That Summer!	Stu	
1982	Remembrance	Sean	
1982	Who Dares Wins	Terrorist (Kevin)	
1983	Flight to Berlin	Jack	
1985	Not Quite Paradise	Angus Ross	
1988	The Cook, the Thief, His Wife & Her Lover	Henchman (Harris)	
1989	Resurrected	Corporal Byker	
1991	Kafka	The Castle Attendant	
1993	Down Among the Big Boys	with Billy Connolly as a henchman	
1993	Nervous Energy	Peter Reid	
1995	Rob Roy	Coll	
1996	Stella Does Tricks	Francis	
1997	Titanic	First Officer William Murdoch	
1999	The Big Brass Ring	Kinzel	
2000	The Closer You Get	Pat	
2000	Little Bird	Michael Hall	
2001	Conspiracy	Dr. Georg Leibbrandt	
2002	The Last Great Wilderness	Magnus	
2003	Young Adam	Daniel Gordon	
2004	One Last Chance	Fitz's dad	
2004	Dirty War	Deputy Assistant Commissioner John Ives	
2006	Alpha Male	Hilary Benz	
2007	Straightheads	Uncredited	
2009	Valhalla Rising	Eirik (Chieftain of the Crusaders)	
2015	Hector	Peter	

=== Television ===
Year	Title	Role	Ref.
1979	All Quiet on the Western Front	Detering (German soldier)	
1980	Rain on the Roof	Billy	
1980	Mackenzie	Jamie Mackenzie	
1980	Barriers	Rob	
1980	The Camerons	Sam Cameron	
1981	The Professionals (episode: "Operation Susie")	Rudiger Molner	
1981	Ill Fares the Land		
1982	Antony and Cleopatra TV		
1983	Good and Bad at Games	Colenso	
1984	Distant Scream		
1986	Paradise Postponed	Gary Kitson	
1986	Boon (episode: "The Big Game Hunt")	Vincent Black	
1989	Only Fools and Horses (episode: "Sickness and Wealth")	Dr Robbie Meadows	
1991–1992	The Advocates	Barrister Greg McDowell	
1993	Spender (episode: "The More Things Change")		
1996	The Mugs Game	Kenny Cowan	
1998	Looking After Jo Jo	Charlie McCann	
1998	Heat of the Sun	John McAlister	
1998	Touch and Go	Rob Aldridge	
1999	The Dark Beginnings of Sherlock Holmes	Professor Canning	
1999	The Bill (episode: "Treading Water")	Steve Raines	
2000	Nature Boy	Len	
2000	Rebus (John Hannah episode: "The Hanging Garden")	DI Jack Morton	
2000	Rebus (John Hannah episode: "Black and Blue")	DI Jack Morton	
2001	Silent Witness (Series 5 episode: "The World Cruise")	DS Chris Moorhouse	
2001	Football TV	Dad	
2003	Real Men	Alistair Jackson	
2003	The Key	Joe	
2003	P.O.W.	Corporal John Stevens	
2003	Witchcraze	Bishop James Carmichael	
2003	Trevor's World of Sport	Ned Scott	
2004	Dirty War	Deputy Assistant Commissioner John Ives	
2005	Malice Aforethought	Inspector	
2005	The Somme	Rawlinson	
2007	Rebus (Ken Stott episode: "The First Stone")	Michael Walker	
2008	Walter's War	Sergeant Fuller	
2008–2009	River City	Daniel McKee	
2013	The Escape Artist	Advocate Depute	
2015	The Interceptor	Cartwright	
2016	Vera	Michael Hogarth	

=== Other credited television roles ===
- Dream Baby
- Shadows on our Skin
- Soldiers Talking Cleanly
- The Quiet Days of Mrs Stafford
- Green Street Revisited
- A Woman Calling
- The Man From Dene
- Concordes last flight (Narrator)

=== Video game ===
- Heavenly Sword (2007) – Master Shen

=== Theatre ===
- A Month in the Country (1981) Olivier Theatre – Snobby Price
- Don Juan (7 April 1981) Cottesloe Theatre – La Ramee (Don Juan's Servant)
- Flying Blind (1981) Royal Court Theatre
- Sergeant Musgraves Dance Major Barbara (1982) Lyttelton Theatre
- In the Blue Cottesloe Theatre
- As I Lay Dying (1985) Cottlesloe Theatre – Vardarmin
- The Garden of England (14 November 1985) Cottlesloe Theatre
- Thyestes (June 1994) Manchester Green Room, and Royal Court Theatre – As Thyestes
- The Murderers (1985) Cottesloe Theatre – Tommy
- A Midsummer Night's Dream – Scottish Opera
- The Orphans Comedy (1986) By Chris Hannan Traverse Theatre Edinburgh
- Lucy's Play (1986) Traverse Theatre Edinburgh
- Racing Demon (1990) By Sir David Hare Link 2
- Road Royal Court Theatre
- Live Like Pigs (By John Arden) Royal Court Theatre
- Sacred Heart (27 March 1999 – 24 April 1999) Royal Court (New Ambassadors Theatre) – Pat
- Our Late Night (20 October 1999 – 6 November 1999) The New Ambassadors Theatre – Lewis
- Green Field (April – May 2002) The Traverse Theatre Company Edinburgh
- The Pillowman (February 2005) The National Theatre
- Beautiful Burnout (2009) National Theatre of Scotland and Frantic Assembly
- Dunsinane (2011), National Theatre of Scotland / Royal Shakespeare Company – MacDuff
- Much Ado About Nothing (2011) – Shakespeare's Globe – Don Pedro
- Jumpy (2011) – Royal Court Theatre – Mark
- In Time o' Strife (2013) National Theatre of Scotland
- Let the Right One In (2013) National Theatre of Scotland production at the Royal Court, London
- Things I Know To Be True – Lyric Hammersmith (2017–2018)
- Wickies: The Vanishing Men of Eilean Mor – Park Theatre, Finsbury Park, London (2 December 2022 – present)
