= Beginning (play) =

2017 play by David Eldridge

- Written by: David Eldridge
- Characters: Laura; Danny
- Original language: English
- Genre: Dark Comedy
- Setting: Crouch End

Premiere
- Place premiered: Dorfman Theatre

Beginning is a 2017 play by David Eldridge. The first of a trilogy of plays to look at love and relationships, it is followed by Middle.

A two-hander, the cast featured Justine Mitchell as Laura and Sam Troughton as Danny. Directed by Polly Findlay, the play opened in the Dorfman at the National Theatre in October 2017, where it ran until 14 November 2017, enjoying a sold-out run.

The production transferred to the Ambassadors Theatre in the West End on 23 January 2018, following previews from 15 January. It was scheduled to conclude its limited run on 24 March. Mitchell and Troughton reprised their roles as Laura and Danny respectively.

The play received favourable reviews, gaining five stars from both Dominic Cavendish in The Daily Telegraph and Fiona Mountford in The Evening Standard, and four stars from Phil Willmott on the London Box Office news & reviews section.

Subsequent productions have been put on at the Gate Theatre, Dublin and the Royal Exchange, Manchester

== Plot ==
Set in the aftermath of Laura's housewarming party at her new flat in Crouch End, Danny, having attended simply as the plus one of a friend, is the last remaining guest. Laura is 38, single, childless and with no immediate family; Danny is 42, divorced, living with his mother and has not seen his daughter for a number of years.

The play begins with them nearly kissing and charts their journey in real time as they both seek to get back to that point. While Laura is clear from the outset that she fancies Danny and wants him to stay over, Danny is reluctant to share his true feelings. Over the course of the play, both begin to open up to one another, they dance to Bros, consume fish finger sandwiches and share their mutual loneliness and isolation in the city of London and where they are in their lives.
