= Jennifer Black =

Scottish actress

Jennifer Black is a Scottish actress known for her roles as Stella Urquhart in the film Local Hero and Gill Templer in the television series Rebus.

== Early life ==
Black was born and grew up in Glasgow, then moved to Bridge of Weir at the age of 13. After leaving school, she studied at the Royal Scottish Academy of Music and Drama. She married and divorced Vincent Friell.

== Career ==
Black worked in a repertory company in Crewe, lived in London for four years then moved back to Scotland. She became well known after playing Stella in the 1983 Bill Forsyth film Local Hero.

She set up her own theatre company in 1990, directing Orphans by Lyle Kessler and Orphans by Therese Raquin. Black has often appeared on television and played Chief Superintendent Gill Templer in the television series Rebus, adapted from the novels by Ian Rankin. She has also appeared on the stage in productions such as An Experienced Woman Gives Advice, Six Black Candles, Lost at Sea and A Taste of Honey by Shelagh Delaney.
