= Claire Rushbrook =

English actress (born 1971)

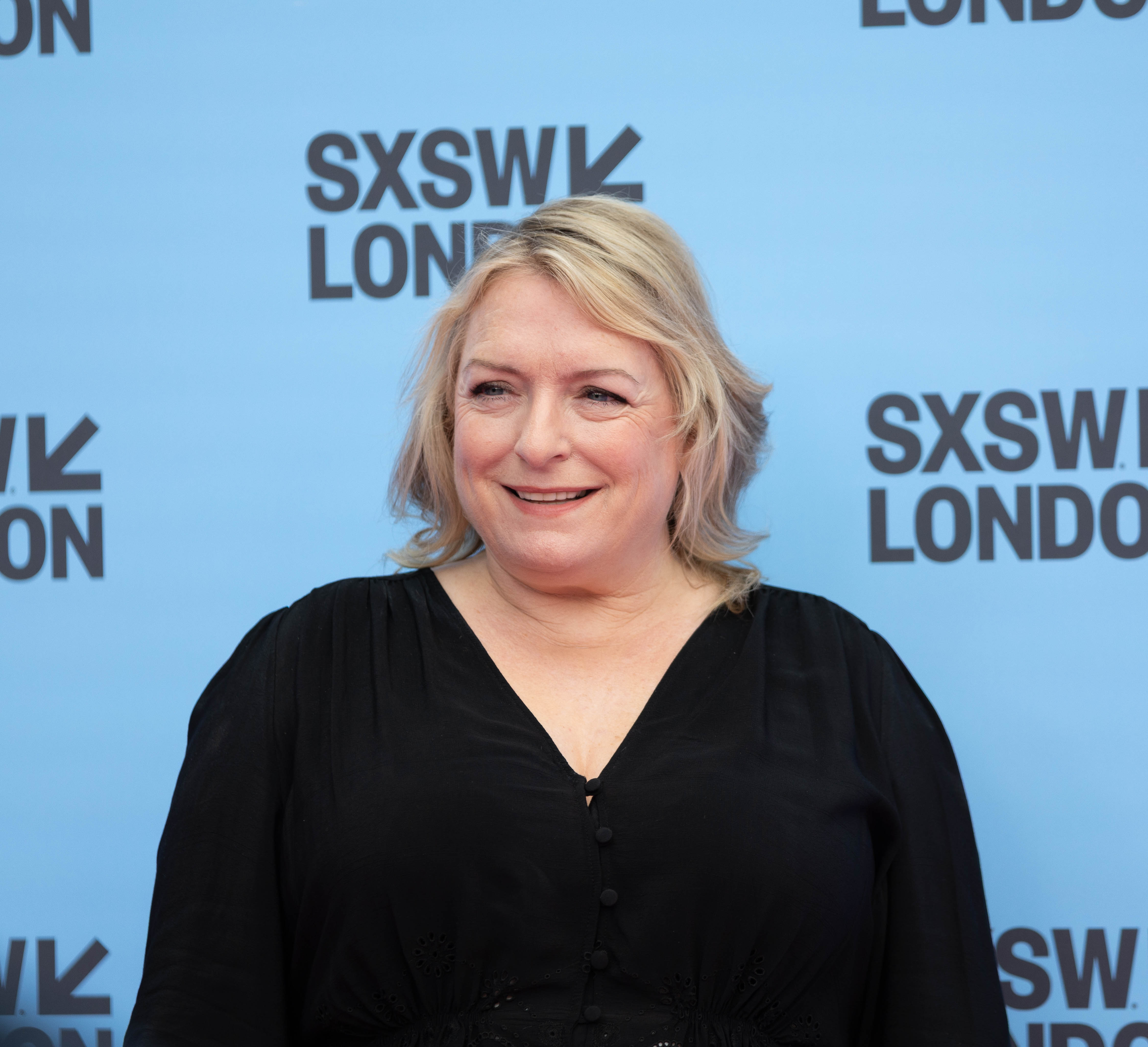
- Rushbrook in 2026
- Born: 25 August 1971 (age 55); Hitchin, Hertfordshire, England
- Education: Rose Bruford College
- Occupation: Actress
- Years active: 1994–present

Claire Louise Rushbrook (born 25 August 1971) is an English actress. Her films include Secrets & Lies (1996) and Ali & Ava (2021). On television, she is known for her roles in the BBC One series The Sins (2000), Carrie & Barry (2004–2005) and Sherwood (2022–), the ITV series Whitechapel (2009–2013) and Home Fires (2015–2016), the E4 series My Mad Fat Diary (2013–2015), and the Disney+ series Rivals (2024–).

== Early life ==
Claire Louise Rushbrook was born on 25 August 1971 in Hitchin, Hertfordshire. She attended Fearnhill School, in Letchworth, Hertfordshire, until 1989, before joining Rose Bruford College of Theatre & Performance, for three years, to study for a BA Hons degree in Theatre Art.

== Career ==
Rushbrook worked mainly in theatre for around five years before moving into film and television. She guest starred in the episodes "The Impossible Planet" and "The Satan Pit" in Doctor Who and had supporting roles in films Secrets & Lies and Spice World. Her Doctor Who guest star status earned her a position in a Doctor Who celebrity edition of The Weakest Link, but ended up being the fourth one voted off. She also appeared in the 2008 BBC comedy drama Mutual Friends, and the 2009 ITV1 dramas Whitechapel, and Collision, both alongside Phil Davis.

Rushbrook's theatre credits include West End productions of Three Sisters as Olga, and Festen as Helene. Other stage roles include Mary Warren in The Crucible (Sheffield Crucible theatre), Sonia in Uncle Vanya (Almeida Theatre), Mum in Market Boy (National Theatre), and Maggie in Middle (National Theatre).

Her films include Mike Leigh's Secrets & Lies (1996), and Carine Adler's Under the Skin (1997) with Samantha Morton. On television, she has starred in The Sins (2000), Linda Green (2001–02), the sitcom Carrie & Barry (2004–05).

From 2013 to 2015, she played Linda Earl-Bouchtat, Rae's Mum, in the television series My Mad Fat Diary, for which she received a 2014 nomination for BAFTA Best Supporting Actress.

In 2016, she appeared in Home Fires (2015–16), in 2020, she worked alongside Millie Bobby Brown and Henry Cavill in Enola Holmes (as Mrs Lane) and with Saoirse Ronan in the film Ammonite. In 2021, she starred opposite Adeel Akhtar in the British film Ali & Ava. In 2021, Rushbrook played Laurie in BBC Radio 4 drama Jazz and Dice.

In 2023 she guest starred in "Love is a Stranger", episode 4 of the eighth series of the BBC's dark comedy anthology, Inside No. 9.

== Filmography ==
=== Film ===
Year	Title	Role	Notes
1996	Secrets & Lies	Roxanne	
1997	Under the Skin	Rose Kelly	
1997	Crocodile Snap	Mum	Short film
1997	Spice World	Deborah	
1999	Plunkett & Macleane	Lady Estelle	
2000	Shiner	Ruth	
2002	Close Your Eyes	Grace	AKA Doctor Sleep
2003	A Changed Man	Anne Marie	Short film
2003	Tethered	Sarah	Short film
2007	I Am Bob	Barlady	Short film
2007	Mary and Mick	Mary	Short film
2019	Spider-Man: Far From Home	Janice	
2020	Ammonite	Eleanor Butters	
2020	Enola Holmes	Mrs. Lane	
2021	Ali & Ava	Ava	
2023	The Unlikely Pilgrimage of Harold Fry	Farmer's Wife	
2023	Sky Peals	Donna	

=== Television ===
Year	Title	Role	Notes
1994	Casualty	Policewoman	Episode: "Love and Affection"
1997	Turning World	Julia Garnett	3 episodes: "#1.1", "#1.2", "#1.3"
1997	Touching Evil	Julie Carney	2 episodes: "Killing with Kindness: Parts 1 & 2"
1999	Coronation Street	Mrs. Barratt	2 episodes
1999	Spaced	Yolanda	Episode: "Art"
1999	Shockers	Terri	Episode: "The Visitor"
2000	The Sins	Faith Blackwell	TV miniseries, 6 episodes
2001–2002	Linda Green	Michelle Fenton	Recurring role, 10 episodes
2002	The Stretford Wives	Elaine Massey Simmons	TV film
2004	Family Business	Rachel Brooker	Recurring role, 6 episodes
2004–2005	Carrie & Barry	Carrie	Main role, 12 episodes
2006	Doctor Who	Ida Scott	2 episodes: "The Impossible Planet", and "The Satan Pit"
2006	Afterlife	Jennifer	Episode: "Things Forgotten"
2007	Inspector George Gently	Valerie Lister	Episode: "Gently Go Man"
2007	Double Time	Sarah	TV film
2008	Ashes to Ashes	Trixie Walsh	Episode: "#1.3"
2008	Mutual Friends	Leigh Cato	Main role, 6 episodes
2009	New Tricks	Pamela Scott	Episode: "Death of a Timeshare Salesman"
2009	Enid	Dorothy Richards	TV film
2009	Collision	Karen Donnelly	TV miniseries, 4 episodes
2009–2013	Whitechapel	Dr. Caroline Llewellyn	Recurring role, 16 episodes
2010	Lizzie and Sarah	Fiona	TV film
2010	Agatha Christie's Marple	Caroline	Episode: "The Blue Geranium"
2011	The Fades	Meg	TV miniseries, 6 episodes
2011	Great Expectations	Mrs. Joe	TV miniseries, 2 episodes: "#1.1", "#1.2"
2012	Murder	Ellen Lowell	TV miniseries, episode: "Joint Enterprise"
2012	Mrs Biggs	Ruby Wright	2 episodes: "#1.2", "#1.3"
2013	The Mill	Mrs. Timperley	TV miniseries, 4 episodes
2013–2015	My Mad Fat Diary	Linda Earl-Bouchtat (Rae's Mum)	Main role, 16 episodes
2015–2016	Home Fires	Pat Simms	Main role, 12 episodes
2017	Genius	Pauline Einstein	Recurring role, 4 episodes
2017	Black Mirror	Police Detective	Episode: "Crocodile"
2017	Death in Paradise	Rachel Baldwin	Episode: "Man Overboard: Part 1"
2018	Requiem	Rose Morgan	Main role, 6 episodes
2018	Kiri	Julie Burnett	Recurring role, 3 episodes
2018	No Offence	DCI Marilyn Marchant	Main role, Series 3, 6 episodes
2018	The Split	Emma Graham	Episode: "1.4"
2019	Don't Forget the Driver	Fran	TV miniseries, main role, 6 episodes
2019	Temple	Gloria Wilson	Main role, 5 episodes
2022	Magpie Murders	Katie Williams	5 episodes
2022-	Sherwood	Cathy Rowley	Main role
2023	Inside No. 9	Vicky	Episode 4: "Love is a Stranger"
2023	Wilderness	Caryl	Recurring role, 6 episodes
2024	Moonflower Murders	Katie Williams	Post-production
2024	A Very Royal Scandal	Sarah, Duchess of York	3 episodes
2024	Rivals	Monica, Lady Baddingham	Recurring role, 8 episodes

=== Radio ===
Date	Title	Role	Director	Station
5 September 2003	The Sound of Solitary Waves	Libby	Claire Grove	BBC Radio 4 Afternoon Play
7 March 2007	Time Breathes	Gemma	Claire Grove	BBC Radio 4 Afternoon Play
29 October 2008	Love Contract	Emma	Claire Grove	BBC Radio 4 Afternoon Play
20 December 2009 – 27 December 2009	Matilda	Mrs. Wormwood	Claire Grove	BBC Radio 4 Classic Serial
13 August 2014 – 10 November 2018	Home Front	Florrie Wilson	Lucy Collingwood	BBC Radio 4

== Personal life ==
She and her husband have been married since 2003 and have two children.
