= Home Fires (British TV series) =

2015 British television series

- Genre: Period drama
- Created by: Simon Block
- Based on: Jambusters by Julie Summers
- Directed by: Robert Quinn; Bruce Goodinson
- Starring: Francesca Annis; Daisy Badger; Mark Bonnar; Samantha Bond; Mark Bazeley; Leanne Best; Clare Calbraith; Chris Coghill; Ruth Gemmell; Frances Grey; Jodie Hamblet Rachel Hurd-Wood; Leila Mimmack; Mike Noble; Claire Price; Claire Rushbrook; Daniel Ryan; Ed Stoppard; Mark Umbers; Fenella Woolgar
- Theme music composer: Samuel Sim
- Country of origin: United Kingdom
- Original language: English
- No. of series: 2
- No. of episodes: 12

Production
- Executive producers: Francis Hopkinson; Catherine Oldfield; Rebecca Eaton
- Producer: Sue de Beauvoir
- Running time: 44–46 minutes
- Production companies: ITV Studios; Masterpiece

Original release
- Network: ITV
- Release: 3 May 2015 – 8 May 2016

Home Fires is a British period television drama about the life of Women's Institute members on the Home Front during the Second World War. Set in a rural Cheshire community called Great Paxford, the series is produced by ITV, and launched its first series in May 2015. The first series is set between September 1939 and early 1940.

The series was inspired by the book Jambusters by Julie Summers. With the first series having an average viewing ratings of 6.2 million ITV commissioned a second six-part series, aired in April 2016. The show focuses on a largely female cast, including notable actresses Francesca Annis, Samantha Bond, Claire Rushbrook, Fenella Woolgar and Leanne Best.

Series 2 of Home Fires premièred on 3 April 2016 and gained 5.2 million views with a 23.7% share. In May 2016 ITV announced it would not be renewing the show.

== Cast and characters ==
- Francesca Annis as Joyce Cameron. Joyce is a pillar of the community, and the historical leader of the Great Paxford Women's Institute. Joyce is sophisticated and serene, and even her ex-nemesis Frances observes that she is a natural leader. Even though she can appear stern, pompous and vindictive, she is actually quite sympathetic to other people and proves herself to be a substantially good person.
- Daisy Badger as Claire Wilson (née Hillman). The former maid of Joyce Cameron and current maid of Frances Barden.
- Mark Bazeley as Bob Simms. An aspiring author following the minor success of his first book. He was a journalist in the First World War and suffered injuries to his arm and leg from shrapnel, though he admits it was nowhere near combat. Volatile, self-centred and pathetic, Bob is physically and emotionally abusive to his wife Pat.
- Leanne Best as Teresa Fenchurch. Great Paxford's new local teacher. She becomes a tenant in Alison Scotlock's home.
- Samantha Bond as Frances Barden. Leader of the WI.
- Clare Calbraith as Steph Farrow. A farming wife who comes to enthusiastically support the WI after some initial reluctance to join. Steph is very happy with her husband and only wants what is best for him; when he decides to enlist, she supports him through love rather than reason.
- Chris Coghill as Stanley Farrow. The local farmer and Steph's husband. He is brave and wants to enlist in the war, despite having unpleasant memories of the last conflict in which he served. Stanley loves his wife and son (also named Stanley) and works hard to provide for them.
- Ruth Gemmell as Sarah Collingborne. Frances Barden's sister and a member of the WI. She is married to the local vicar.
- Frances Grey as Erica Campbell. Wife of Dr. Will Campbell and the local pharmacist.
- Rachel Hurd-Wood as Kate Campbell. First daughter of Erica and Will Campbell. Vivacious and outgoing, she is more extroverted than her sister Laura.
- Leila Mimmack as Laura Campbell. The second daughter of Will and Erica Campbell.
- Mike Noble as Spencer Wilson. The local postman. Spencer takes a fancy to Claire after coming to her rescue in a bicycling accident. He is cheery and supports the WI's new form.
- Claire Price as Miriam Brindsley. The wife of local butcher Bryn, and a member of the WI. The thought of war terrifies her, as she knows it will eventually take away her son David.
- Claire Rushbrook as Pat Simms. A member of the WI. A battered wife, she has been a victim of her husband Bob's physical and verbal abuse for many years. She makes every effort to keep him happy, but remains with him out of fear. She lies about his abuse and makes apologies for his behaviour.
- Daniel Ryan as Bryn Brindsley. The local butcher and husband to Miriam. Bryn fought in the First World War and survived. However, he was scarred by the events and Miriam forbids him from enlisting again. He cares greatly for his family and offers advice to his son David, who is determined to enlist.
- Fenella Woolgar as Alison Scotlock. Alison is a member of the WI. She lost her husband George during WWI, and his name can be seen on the memorial wall. Frances tells her husband that the WI is essential in Alison's case, because if she was not a member she would never leave the house and her life would revolve around looking at the memorial wall and caring for her dog, Boris.
- Jodie Hamblet as Jenny Marshall. Jenny is the switchboard operator for Great Paxford and works alongside Pat.
- Jacqueline Pilton as Cookie. An elderly member of the WI. Cookie is kind and worries for the WI when it becomes corrupt and selfish under Joyce's rule. However, she shows a lot of happiness when Frances takes over and happily supports the newly reformed WI's movements.
- Alexandre Willaume as Marek Novotny.
- Eileen Davies as Anne. The friend of Joyce and constant supporter of Mrs Cameron.
- Anthony Calf as Peter Barden. Peter is a businessman. He is the husband of Frances and very supportive of her acts in the WI.
- Mark Rowley as Stephen Banks.
- Sarah Thom as Jan Wilson, Spencer Wilson's mother.

== Episodes ==
=== Series overview ===
Series	Episodes	Originally released	
Series	Episodes	First released	Last released
1	6	3 May 2015	14 June 2015
2	6	3 April 2016	8 May 2016

=== Summary ===
When the WI is reformed by Frances Barden (Samantha Bond), she makes the committee less exclusive and more egalitarian; she is later voted as the official President. Meanwhile, Pat (Claire Rushbrook), a member of the committee, is being abused by her husband Bob, upon whom she is forced to wait hand and foot. Bob becomes increasingly abusive as Pat finds herself and begins to be noticed by the town and her fellow WI members, sparking increased jealousy and anger in her husband, who blames her for his lack of the success he feels he deserves as a writer.

The newly reformed WI's first project is the gathering of wild blackberries which they then use to make jam, as "every pound of jam we make is a pound of jam that doesn't have to come in on the ships".

When war is officially declared, the men of the town begin to consider what roles they might play. Miriam's son, David, is determined to enlist in the Navy, which terrifies her. However, after a talk with his father, who fought in WWI, he accepts the idea that in order to soothe his mother's fears and give her as much time as possible to overcome them he should wait to be "called up" or drafted.

However, such is Miriam's fear of losing her son to war that when the National Registry form comes from the government, she deliberately leaves David's name off with the intention of keeping him out of the draft. When David discovers what she has done, he enlists in the Navy anyway. Shortly thereafter the Navy delivers an official letter which Miriam hides in a panic, assuming it is a notice of his death. She cannot face opening the letter and having her fears turn into immutable reality. However, when Bryn finds the hidden and unopened letter, it turns out they are reporting that he is only missing in action. Grasping at straws, Miriam sees this as actually hopeful as it means the Navy is not sure of his death and that he may still be alive, though lost.

Dr Campbell finds he has lung cancer, preventing him from enlisting. His wife, who had been wishing for something to keep him out of the armed services, is horrified.

Spencer is drafted but registers as a conscientious objector. His friends and neighbours almost unilaterally begin to vilify and torment him. A mob gathers and coats his bicycle, which he uses to deliver the post, with blood and chicken feathers. With the villagers shunning him, Claire worries for him. She gently persuades him that she is not afraid of the reactions of the other villagers and convinces him to let her stand at his side.

Alison takes as a tenant the new schoolteacher, Teresa Fenchurch. Later Teresa reveals herself to Alison as a lesbian. Initially Alison is shocked but she overcomes her initial shock and reassures Teresa that she wants her to stay as Teresa has become her best (and nearly only) friend.

Steph worries for her husband when she realizes he feels he must join and fight. Eventually she confronts him and tells him to go, as he is gradually tearing himself apart over this decision.

When war becomes even more certain, Frances and the WI decide it is time for a community air raid shelter to be installed in case of an attack. In order to intercept Joyce's interference with this plan, Frances enlists Claire in a plot to misdirect Joyce by making her think they are planning to use the church as the town's air raid shelter. Thus Joyce's efforts at stymieing Frances and the "new" WI, of which she strongly disapproves, are totally misdirected and the plan for the actual shelter proceeds without interference.

Teresa realizes that neither Steph nor her son can read and is in danger of losing the farm because, since she can't read them, she is not complying with government regulations about wartime farming. She teaches Steph to read in order to save the family farm from confiscation due to non-compliance with government farming regulations.

In the final episode of the first series, Bob leaves for London, leaving Pat relieved and happy to be away from him, whilst Joyce leaves for the coast. She speaks with Frances over the war effort and hands over the keys to her tennis courts so that they may be used for food production. As the series finishes the final scene hints at the war taking its toll in Great Paxford.

=== Series 1 (2015) ===
(1939-1940)

No. overall	No. in series	Title	Directed by	Written by	Original release date	UK viewers (millions)
1	1	"Episode One"	Bruce Goodison	Simon Block,	3 May 2015	6.16
August 1939. When Joyce resigns from the WI, Frances decides to revive it and make it more welcoming to the women in the village. Meanwhile she works to help the army's food scramble. Dr Campbell learns the deadly truth of why he cannot enlist. Steph reluctantly signs up for the WI but soon enjoys her first meeting.
2	2	"Episode Two"	Bruce Goodison	Simon Block	10 May 2015	5.56
September 1939. As the threat of war looms closer to the village, its residents must adjust to unwelcome changes. News of the war prompts discussion of who shall enlist. Frances works to help the war effort, while Pat's marriage begins to crumble. Meanwhile Joyce is on the march to regain control over the WI. David must make a decision on whether to fight or not. Frances has high hopes for the available land in the village to help the war effort.
3	3	"Episode Three"	Bruce Goodison	Simon Block	17 May 2015	5.31
November 1939. As the war progresses the people of Great Paxford are each affected. Alison is forced to work for traitors. Sarah worries when her husband wants to enlist, meanwhile Kate wants to get married but to the anger of her family. Miriam decides she must do something to stop David from enlisting; she takes action, but the consequences begin to pressure her.
4	4	"Episode Four"	Bruce Goodison	Simon Block	24 May 2015	5.34
February 1940. Secrets and lies are rife in the village. Miriam knows her deception can’t be kept from David forever, but she’s terrified of the consequences of him finding out. Teresa meets an old friend again, with a life changing offer and the knowledge of a secret. Frances tries to help Sarah.
5	5	"Episode Five"	Robert Quinn	Simon Block	7 June 2015	5.50
March 1940. Steph wins a personal victory. Frances gets more than she bargained for when an evacuee shows up at Great Paxford. Theresa receives tragic news and Alison learns her secret. Erica and Pat have a close call. Laura faces a difficult decision. The WI try to make a social shelter, led by Frances. Kate tries to move on. The war begins to take its toll on Great Paxford, with consequences and danger. David enlists behind the back of his mother. Alison wants to learn the truth about Teresa.
6	6	"Episode Six"	Robert Quinn	Simon Block	14 June 2015	5.36
May 1940. France's expected defeat makes the possibility of Nazi invasion more real than ever before. Frances is determined to help Pat, and Sarah learns to shoot. Alison is plagued by her decision to work with the traitors, with terrible consequences. The WI sets its sights high for fund raising, while Miriam receives a telegram concerning her son. Teresa steps in to help Alison but her actions cannot stop the course of justice. Charlotte files for divorce, with Laura as correspondent. Laura faces a scandal; can she handle the pressure?

=== Series 2 (2016) ===
(1940)

No. overall	No. in series	Title	Directed by	Written by	Original release date	UK viewers (millions)
7	1	"Episode One"	Robert Quinn	Simon Block	3 April 2016	6.59
11 June 1940. As war begins to take its toll on Great Paxford and the Battle of Britain looms, Teresa must step in to protect an Italian resident from the other people of the village. Sarah begins to feel alone after she gets some tragic news about her husband on the front lines, yet she must rise up to address the village over the silencing of the church bells. Alison gets the verdict on whether the charges will be upheld or dropped, however she must then make a difficult choice after the result. Claire and Spencer marry in secret; Jenny learns of this and tells Frances. Pat befriends a kindly Czech soldier and enjoys her new life with no husband. Frances has a heart stopping encounter.
8	2	"Episode Two"	Robert Quinn	Glen Laker	10 April 2016	6.09
July 1940. Frances decides she will not come into the shelter during an air raid, leaving Sarah with a difficult decision. Pat's abusive husband is back in town, but she feels torn as she grows closer to the soldier Marek. Laura faces scandal after the divorce becomes public and her reputation begins to crumble. Alison begins her work with police. Meanwhile, Will begins radiation treatment for his cancer, supported by his daughter, Kate. Frances must come to terms with the death of her husband, while Alison uncovers a shocking revelation about Peter upon analysing his will. Laura's friendship with Tom is tested due to intervention from Mrs Talbot, whilst Jenny comes to blows with Laura and makes plans for her future. Joyce returns and offers some unexpected comfort to Frances, saying that her husband was a gentlemen. Frances discovers a terrible secret hidden by her husband: Pete was having an affair with the company accountant, Helen.
9	3	"Episode Three"	Robert Quinn	Simon Block	17 April 2016	6.05
16 July 1940. Frances uncovers a horrific secret about her husband's secret life; he has a son with the company accountant, who also died in the car crash. Alison is approached by the police once more to work for them and must choose between her loyalties to Frances and her country. At a public dance hosted by the Czech soldiers Joyce notices the level of intimacy between Sarah and the Wing Commander; Joyce convinces her that she must remain loyal to her husband for her sake rather than for the scandal. Jenny listens into a call between Joyce and her husband where it seems that Joyce is a Nazi sympathiser and she alerts the village, causing trouble for Joyce with shocking consequences. However Joyce soon reclaims control and Jenny takes a blow. Pat is in danger when Bob returns and someone sees her with Marek. Meanwhile, Teresa is attracted to an unlikely source - a female pilot who is praised by the other soldiers.
10	4	"Episode Four"	John Hayes	Simon Block	24 April 2016	5.65
24 July 1940. Frances has big plans for the factory now being in charge of the factory and decides that she can upgrade the working life, yet Frances also reveals to Sarah she has plans to rid herself of the 20% shareholder's threat. Can Teresa change? This is what she asks of herself when she is asked on a date. Alison worries that her involvement with the Lyons could have dangerous consequences beyond just damaging her relationship with Frances. Marek and Pat meet and are clearly inseparable, but they are seen. David Brindsley is now home, but they discover that his injuries are more than on the surface. The Campbells receive good news for a change, which prompts Laura to volunteer for the ROC. Also a first aid training meeting is held in the village. Frances makes the decision to attempt to buy out Mr Lakin, and accidentally sees Noah while at the house. This causes friction between Frances and Sarah as while talking she blames Noah for all that has happened. Will Frances be able to sway Mr Lakin?
11	5	"Episode Five"	John Hayes	Simon Block	1 May 2016	5.44
30 August 1940. Bombing brings unnatural light to the horizon. The harvest becomes an almost impossible challenge as Steph's workers leave for better wages elsewhere. A woman in search of David Brindsley’s parents thanks them for saving her son, believing David died saving him. Meanwhile the Czech soldiers are given warning of their reassignment, and Marek asks Pat again to leave Bob. Joyce's estranged son returns with news that she now has a granddaughter. Frances struggles to understand her husband's double life while her parachute factory is under a threat of which only Alison seems aware. Eventually the whole WI comes to Steph and Stan's aid with the maize harvest after she collapses with extreme exhaustion. Realising how quick and brutal the war has become, Nick and Teresa's relationship takes an unexpected twist. Sarah finds herself in danger.
12	6	"Episode Six"	John Hayes	Simon Block	8 May 2016	5.44
3 September 1940. Frances's factory is closed by the authorities dues to producing faulty parachutes, and Alison blames herself. Nick and Teresa get married even after a couple of people who know something deeper about her ask probing questions regarding its wisdom. Frances begins to thaw towards Noah, partly with a piece of gentle assistance from Joyce. Halfway through the wedding ceremony, Miriam goes into labour. Bob eventually confronts Pat about her relationship with Marek after increasing his micro-management of her life and continued psychological abuse. She storms out of the wedding reception only to be stopped in her tracks by the crash of a crippled RAF fighter aircraft into the front of a house.

== Reception ==
The first series had a consolidated average rating of 6.2 million viewers to date and a 24 per-cent share. June 2015, ITV announced that it had ordered a second series of the programme. Samantha Bond was nominated for an award from the Satellite Awards. Series 2 met with similar success compared with Series 1 as the première episode gained 5.2 million overnight views, with the second episode reaching 4.7 million views. Just days after the broadcast of the final episode of series 2, ITV announced it was cancelling the show and there would be no third series. A network spokesman said that despite the show's success, "the ITV commissioning team continues to refresh the channel's drama portfolio, hence the decision not to commission a further new series."

Fans gathered to protest against the cancellation, and a Change.org petition to bring the show back was signed by over 50,000 viewers, but the campaign was ultimately unsuccessful.

== Novelisation ==
After the series' cancellation, the writer continued the story as a novelisation, with the first of four audiobooks published in 2017.

== Broadcast ==
Home Fires first aired on 3 May 2015 on ITV. Internationally, the series premièred in Australia on 10 October 2015 on BBC First. The series premièred in the United States on 4 October 2015 on PBS.
