= Middle (play) =

2022 play by David Eldridge

- Written by: David Eldridge
- Characters: Maggie; Gary
- Original language: English

Premiere
- Place premiered: Dorfman Theatre

Middle is a 2022 play by David Eldridge. A two-hander, Middle is the second of three plays exploring love and relationships, following Beginning.

== Plot ==
Middle follows Maggie and Gary in what is the middle of their relationship. When Maggie drops the bombshell of "I don’t think I love you any more", the play explores their relationship and how they are to move forward.

== Productions ==
Directed by Polly Findlay, the play opened in the Dorfman at the National Theatre on 4 May 2022, following previews from 27 April. It played a limited run to 18 June 2022. The cast featured Claire Rushbrook as Maggie and Daniel Ryan as Gary.

== Critical reception ==
In her four star review for Time Out, Caroline McGinn says the play "is always gripping, often painfully funny, and mostly deeply sad. Director Polly Findlay manages the pace and the sad/funny balance beautifully." Arifa Akbar for The Guardian gave the play three stars out of five and stated that it "feels like a true and tender representation of a marriage in its middle stages, a drama that is tepid at times, a little plodding and soft around the edges but forging on."
