= Alex Otterlei =

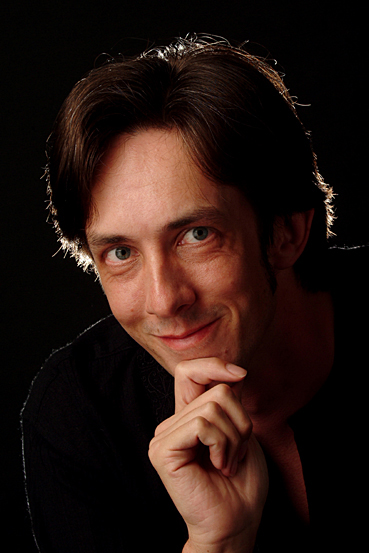
- Portrait of Alex Otterlei in 2005

Background information
- Born: 17 September 1968 (age 58)
- Origin: Antwerp, Belgium
- Genres: orchestral, video games, theatre and short film
- Occupation: Composer
- Years active: 1990–present
- Website: www.alexotterlei.com

Alex Otterlei (born 17 September 1968) is a Belgian composer who writes music for orchestra, concert band and other ensembles. Otterlei has created music and sound effects for theatre, short films, video games, roleplaying games and art installations. His music appears on various albums.

== Biography ==
In the 1990s Otterlei pioneered the art of writing soundtracks for roleplaying games, resulting in popular rpg-soundtracks such as “Battlethemes”, “Arthur” and “Where Evil Lurks”. His Cthulhu-inspired orchestral soundtrack “Horror on the Orient Express” achieved international acclaim. Between 2003 and 2018 Alex Otterlei scored music and/or created sound effects for various videogames including the award-winning series Monkey Tales. Starting from 2009 Otterlei also began to write concert music for orchestra, concert band and other ensembles. Although considered mainly autodidact, Otterlei was later on mentored by Hans Lamal and prominent composer Luc van Hove.

== Style ==
Best described as neo-tonal, Otterlei does not shun recognizable melodies. He employs modern as well as traditional harmonies, integrating consonance and dissonance in a fluid and logical way. His rhythmic structures can be complex, but they also remain dependent of traditional metrical thinking.

== Works ==
=== Symphonic ===
- "Dona, Dona" for orchestra and beginning guitarist, based on a theme by Sholom Secunda (2018)
- "Divinity, Song for Eternity", based on a theme by Kirill Pokrovsky (2015)
- "Prologue to Horror on the Orient Express" (2013)
- "Wondrous Journey Part I" (2011)
- "New Beginnings" (2010)
- "Ocean Ouverture" (2006)
- "City Life & The Race" (2002)
- "Horror on the Orient Express" (integral 2000)

=== Concert band ===
- "New Beginnings" (2012)
- "Horror on the Orient Express" (Suite version 2012)

=== Various ensembles ===
- "Onwards We Go" for cello and contrabass, base on a theme by Kirill Pokrovsky (2015)
- "Supercell" for piano, percussion and dance ensemble, in collaboration with Opening Doors and the European Disability Arts Festival (2014)
- "Prologue to Horror on the Orient Express" for strings and piano (2013)
- "Prelude for Harp and Mermaid" for harp and soprano (2006)
- "Violince and Passion" for string quintet (1994)
- "The Final Exile" for strings, samples and death metal band "Vaïs" (1993)
- "Old Isaac's Party" for strings and piano (1991)
- "The Yearning" for strings and woodwinds (1991)

=== Music theatre ===
- "Eeuwige Sneeuw", music for the theatrical play by Stefan Perceval (2010)

=== Songs and lyrics (non-album) ===
- "The Old Man", music and lyrics (1993)
- "My Faerie Lady", music and lyrics (1993)
- "Come to Daddy" (1990)
- "Lady Life Loves You Too" (1990)
- "The Rose and the Butterfly" (1990)
- "Like an Autumn Leaf in Summer" (1990)
- "Tell Me How I Was Before I Met You" (1990)
- "Running at the Speed of Light (1989)
- "Caught in a Spiral" (1989)
- "Bodies in Danger" (1989)
- "Visions of People" (1988)

== Discography ==
- 2012: "Wondrous Journey, Part 1"_Single download
- 2011: "Eeuwige Sneeuw, Soundtrack" _CD
- 2010: "New Beginnings"_Single download
- 2006: "Where Evil Lurks, Special Edition"_CD re-release, with an exclusive story written by Rhianna Pratchett.)
- 2005: "Xyanide, Official Soundtrack"_Enhanced CD
- 2000: "Horror on the Orient Express"_CD
- 1994: "Where Evil Lurks"_CD
- 1993: "Horror Triptych"_mini CD
- 1992: "Battlethemes"_CD
- 1990: "Arthur"_CD

== Game scores ==
- 2017: "Divinity Original Sin 2" for PC, Xbox One and PS4, ambient and sound effects (senior sound designer)
- 2015: "Divinity Original Sin Enhanced Edition " for PC, Xbox One and PS4, dialogues, ambient and sound effects (voice director and lead sound designer)
- 2014: "Divinity Original Sin"for PC, Xbox and PS4, ambient and sound effects (sound designer)
- 2010: “Flames of Vengeance” for PC and Xbox 360, additional music & sound design
- 2010: "Monkey Tales " for PC: music, ambient & SFX (received Medea Award 2011)
- 2008: "Totems" (unreleased) for Xbox 360 and PC (composer and sound designer)
- 2007: “Fairytale Fights”(demo): ambient & sound effects
- 2006: “Aqua Vita” for Sony PS3: sound effects
- 2006: "Mesmerize_Distort" for Sony PS3: ambient and sound effects
- 2006: "Xyanide Resurrection" for Sony PSP & PS2: ambient & sound effects + music for Animated Comic-bonus
- 2005: "Project Delta" (unreleased) for Sony PS3 and Xbox 360 (composer and sound design)
- 2005 "Wizard of Funk" (unreleased) for Sony PS2 (sound design)
- 2003: "Xyanide" for Xbox: music score

== Awards ==
- 2011: Best Soundtrack Award for the shortfilm “Darkness” by Kevin Lauryssen at the Ciné Public Festival
- 2006: Gouden Klaproos Award for international achievements bestowed by SABAM
- 2002: Best Young Filmcomposer Award at the World Soundtrack Awards
