= Totems (video game) =

TOTEMS
- Developer(s): 10tacle Studios Belgium
- Publisher(s): 10tacle Studios
- Designer(s): Yves Grolet, Stephane Bura
- Release: Cancelled
- Genre(s): Action-adventure, platform
- Mode(s): Single-player

Totems (officially TOTEMS) is a cancelled video game for the Xbox 360 and PC developed by 10Tacle Studios Belgium.

== Gameplay, story and universe ==
Totems is a 3D platformer for the Xbox 360 and PC. The player controls the main character Gia, a parkour expert. Gia inherits various powers from four different animal totem spirits. Totems uses a Semantic Environment Sensing System (SESS), meaning all of these actions can be performed with one button and Gia will react automatically according to the place she is in the world. Each spirit will be mapped to a face button on the 360 controller enabling players to pull off parkour moves and attacks very quickly. The game contains a non-linear world placed on a fictional island and a highly interactive environment. The enemies Gia encounters are able to perform similar acrobatic abilities and their AI enables them to follow Gia wherever she goes. The developers were creating a whole new shaman mythology for Totems.

== 10tacle Studios Belgium ==
10tacle Studios Belgium, located in Charleroi, Belgium, specialised in the development of video games. Its CEO, Yves Grolet, and design director, Stephane Bura, ere the company's creative leaders. Grolet and other core team members became known through their widely acclaimed PC game Outcast released in 1999 by Infogrames. On August 5, 2008, 10tacle Studios Belgium ceased all operations and, as a company, has closed down.

== NeoReality engine ==
NeoReality is an integrated video game production platform developed by 10tacle Studios Belgium. It contains several innovative tools and engines including 3D graphics rendering, physics, AI, game-specific scripting language, etc. Semantic Environment Sensing System was a technology which allows the player and all NPC characters to use the world as an open-ended playground, using each architectural feature as an opportunity for movement.
