= Logan Nelson =

American composer (born 1996)

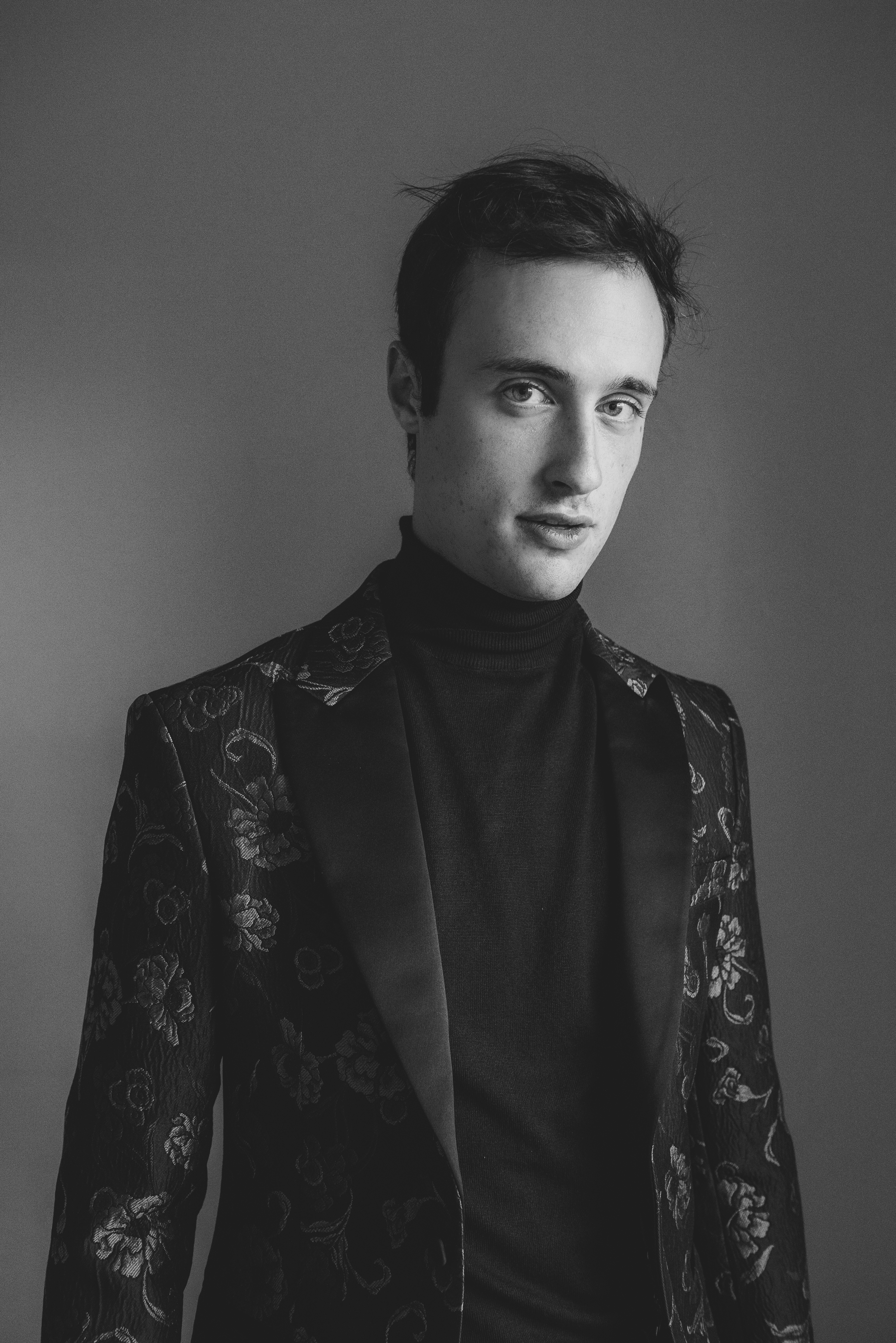
- Nelson in January 2018

Background information
- Born: November 11, 1996 (age 30); Wichita, Kansas, U.S.
- Genres: Film score, electronic, ambient, orchestral
- Occupations: Composer, producer
- Instruments: Piano, viola
- Website: logannelsonmusic.com

Logan Nelson (born November 11, 1996) is an American composer who has composed scores for films, video games, and modern dance productions. In 2018, he received the SABAM Award for Best Young International Composer by the World Soundtrack Academy. He composes music for The Morning Show with Carter Burwell.

== Life and education ==
Nelson was born and raised in Wichita, Kansas. In his early years, he "fell in love with" the viola and studied piano and composition with local professors. Nelson attended the University of Southern California where he majored in Music Composition and minored in Cinematic Arts. At USC, he studied music composition with Ted Hearne and film scoring with Garry Schyman; Nelson worked closely with the Glorya Kaufman School of Dance and a solo violinist to "sample unique and interesting violin textures that he later produced into electronic elements" in collaboration with student choreographers, the project concluded with two performances.

== Career ==
Logan Nelson has composed the music for Seasons 2 and 3 of the Emmy-winning Apple TV+ drama, The Morning Show, in collaboration with Carter Burwell. He also scored the romantic comedy, Straight Up. The film was produced by Valparaiso Pictures and stars actress Katie Findlay.

As a collaborator with Kris Bowers, Logan wrote music for Netflix’s critically acclaimed Dear White People, as well as the Oscar-winning film, Green Book. Additionally, Logan has worked at Hans Zimmer’s Remote Control Productions.

Nelson also produces music for the synth-pop duo, LightHouse. Their song, Nebula, was described by NEST HQ (Owsla) as "mature, highly-refined synth-pop brilliantly contrasting bright, summery sounds with ghostly, melancholy vocal harmonies and a dark, echoing flair to the production." In 2018, LightHouse was featured in FLAUNT Magazine.

== Awards and honors ==
- Winner, ASCAP Screen Music Award for Top Rated Series (The Morning Show), 2024
- Winner, SABAM Award for Best Young International Composer, 2018
- Winner, National YoungArts Foundation, 2015 and 2016
