= Midwinter Break =

- American theatrical release poster
- Directed by: Polly Findlay
- Written by: Bernard MacLaverty; Nick Payne
- Based on: Midwinter Break by Bernard MacLaverty
- Produced by: Guy Heeley; Floor Onrust
- Starring: Lesley Manville; Ciarán Hinds; Niamh Cusack
- Cinematography: Laurie Rose
- Edited by: Lucia Zucchetti; Stephen O'Connell
- Music by: Hannah Peel
- Production companies: Shoebox Films; Film4; Family Affair Films
- Distributed by: Focus Features (United States); Universal Pictures (United Kingdom)
- Release dates: 20 February 2026 (United States); 20 March 2026 (United Kingdom)
- Running time: 90 minutes
- Countries: United Kingdom; Netherlands
- Language: English
- Box office: $1.8 million

Midwinter Break is a 2026 drama film directed by Polly Findlay. The film is based on the 2017 novel of the same name by Bernard MacLaverty and follows a couple's trip to Amsterdam that stirs up memories of the past. The film stars Lesley Manville and Ciarán Hinds.

The film was released in the United States on 20 February 2026, and in the United Kingdom on 20 March.

== Cast ==
- Lesley Manville as Stella
  - Julie Lamberton as young Stella
- Ciarán Hinds as Gerry
  - Ed Sayer as young Gerry
- Niamh Cusack as Kathy
- Leila Laaraj as Hennie

== Production ==
In September 2017, Film4 acquired the film rights to the 2017 novel Midwinter Break by Bernard MacLaverty, with John Crowley attached to direct, MacLaverty writing the story, and Guy Heeley producing the film under his Shoebox Films production company banner. In May 2023, Lesley Manville and Ciarán Hinds were cast in the film, with Polly Findlay replacing Crowley as the new director. In mid-April 2024, crews were seen preparing a Christmas-set in and around Kelvinside Hillhead Parish Church in Hyndland, Glasgow, with fake snow being placed on the ground outside and Christmas trees being propped up at the altar inside the church. Principal photography took place in Scotland, with locations such as Athole Gardens, Huntly Gardens, and Kelvinside Hillhead Parish Church in Glasgow, and wrapped on June of that year, with post-production being underway. Stephen O’Connell and Lucia Zucchetti edited the film. Hannah Peel composed the score for the film. The film accessed £225,000 from Screen Scotland's Film Development and Production Fund as well as receiving Screen Commission Recce Funding.

== Release ==
The film was released in the United States on 20 February 2026. The film had its UK premiere at the Glasgow Film Festival on 26 February, and was theatrically released in the United Kingdom and Ireland on 20 March.

== Reception ==
On the review aggregator website Rotten Tomatoes, 65% of 51 critics' reviews are positive, with an average rating of 6.5/10. The website's consensus reads: "While Ciarán Hinds and Lesley Manville are characteristically terrific playing off of each other, this rumination on love and spirituality is so restrained that it veers into tedium." Metacritic, which uses a weighted average, assigned the film a score of 60 out of 100, based on 16 critics, indicating "mixed or average" reviews.
