= Rebus (2000 TV series) =

British television detective drama series

- DVD cover (Series 2–4)
- Genre: Crime drama
- Created by: Ian Rankin
- Starring: John Hannah; Ken Stott; Gayanne Potter; Claire Price; Sara Stewart; Jennifer Black; Ron Donachie; Ewan Stewart; Jenny Ryan
- Composers: Simon Rogers; David Ferguson
- Country of origin: Scotland
- Original language: English
- No. of series: 4
- No. of episodes: 14 (list of episodes)

Production
- Executive producers: Eric Coulter; Philip Hinchcliffe
- Producers: Alan J. Wands; Murray Ferguson
- Production locations: Edinburgh, Scotland
- Cinematography: Alasdair Walker
- Editors: Chris Buckland; Jon Gow
- Running time: 60–120 minutes
- Production companies: Scottish Television/ STV Studios, Clerkenwell Films

Original release
- Network: ITV
- Release: 26 April 2000 – 7 December 2007

Rebus is a Scottish television detective drama series based on the Inspector Rebus novels by the Scottish author Ian Rankin. The series, produced by STV Studios for the ITV network, was broadcast between 26 April 2000 and 7 December 2007, and consisted of fourteen episodes across four series.

The first series starred John Hannah as the title character; and was co-produced by Hannah's own production company, Clerkenwell Films. After Hannah quit, the role was re-cast with Ken Stott appearing in three subsequent series, produced in-house by STV.

In 2022, it was announced that Nordic streaming service Viaplay was to produce a new Rebus adaptation starring Richard Rankin. The series premiered in 2024.

== Production ==
The first series is very different in both format and style. Hannah's portrayal of Rankin's world-weary detective was questioned by many who knew the books, as he did not physically match their image of Rebus. Hannah himself has said he felt forced into the role, having been executive producer, when his own choice for the role, Peter Mullan, was rejected by STV.

Hannah's interpretation of the inspector has been viewed as deeper than the later productions, using narration to expand the viewers insight into the character's thoughts, or to reveal background information, which never occurs during Stott's tenure. The earlier stories also retained the darkness of the novels and were more faithful to the original storylines, while longer running times meant that each story could be less ruthless with Rankin's many asides and sub-plots.

"The First Stone" is the only story in the series not to be based on a full Rebus novel, coming instead from a novella in a collection of short stories. "Knots and Crosses" is the only story which, despite bearing the name of a Rankin book, does not share the plot.

== Cancellation ==
In February 2008, ITV announced that Rebus had been axed, amid reports that Stott had told producers he did not want to continue in the role. ITV indicated at the time that further "one-off specials are a possibility for the future." In April 2011, it was reported that the series could make a return to television, and a spokeswoman for STV confirmed a comeback was on the cards: "We fully intend to bring Rebus back in the future. There are no firm plans yet, but it will return."

In 2012, Rankin announced that he has purchased the rights to the TV series back, and that he does not intend to bring Rebus back in the present format, having criticised the shorter format of the later series.

== Release ==
All three Stott series were released on DVD in the United Kingdom in 2007. In Region 1, Koch Vision released the first series on DVD on 10 January 2006. Series two to four were released by Acorn Media between 2006 and 2008. In 2008 Delta released the Hannah series in a four-disc box set.

== Cast ==
- John Hannah as DI John Rebus (Series 1)
- Ken Stott as DI John Rebus (Series 2–4)
- Gayanne Potter as DS Siobhan Clarke (Series 1)
- Claire Price as DS Siobhan Clarke (Series 2–4)
- Sara Stewart as DCI Gill Templer (Series 1)
- Jennifer Black as DCI Gill Templer (Series 2–4)
- Ron Donachie as DCS Jack Gunner (Series 3–4)
- Ewan Stewart as DI Jack Morton (Series 1)
- Jenny Ryan as WPC Mary Logan (Series 1)

== Episode list ==
=== Series 1 (2000–2001) ===
No. overall	No. in series	Title	Directed by	Written by	Original release date	Viewers (millions)
1	1	"Black & Blue"	Martyn Friend	Stuart Hepburn	26 April 2000	7.70
Based on Black & Blue; Rebus investigates when a number of women are killed with the same modus operandi as that used by 'The Preacher', a prolific serial killer active in Edinburgh during the 1980s. But is a copycat killer at large, or has 'The Preacher' returned to finish what he started?
2	2	"The Hanging Garden"	Maurice Phillips	Ben Brown	15 July 2000	5.89
Based on The Hanging Garden; Rebus investigates a suspected case of human trafficking and a growing territory war between gangster Tommy Telford and the jailed 'Big Ger' Cafferty. Rebus' daughter Sammy is knocked down in apparent hit-and-run. Can Rebus head off trouble, and can he track down his daughter's assailant?
3	3	"Dead Souls"	Maurice Phillips	Stuart Hepburn	13 September 2001	N/A
Based on Dead Souls; Rebus is forced to juggle two complex cases when an old friend approaches him to trace her son, who has disappeared, and a former colleague is killed in a freak accident, which asks the question – did he kill himself or was he murdered?
4	4	"Mortal Causes"	David Moore	Mark Greig	20 September 2001	0.52
Based on Mortal Causes; Rebus is forced to revisit a pact he made with a crime lord who identified who attacked his daughter in a freak hit-and-run, when his own son is murdered by a gang involved in gun running, right-wing extremism and racist white-power fanatics.

=== Series 2 (2006) ===
No. overall	No. in series	Title	Directed by	Written by	Original release date	Viewers (millions)
5	1	"The Falls"	Matthew Evans	Daniel Boyle	2 January 2006	9.00
Based on The Falls; Rebus investigates the murder of a retired obstetrician, who is found dead in his home having been the victim of torture. A clue left at the scene by the killer leads Rebus to the local museum, and puts him onto the trail of a stalker targeting a university student.
6	2	"Fleshmarket Close"	Matthew Evans	Daniel Boyle	6 March 2006	6.27
Based on Fleshmarket Close; Rebus investigates the death of a Kosovan national who is found dead in a seedy Edinburgh slum, but a racist slur left on the victim's head leads him into contact with a group of local gangland bosses, and it's not long before a second corpse is discovered.

=== Series 3 (2006) ===
No. overall	No. in series	Title	Directed by	Written by	Original release date	Viewers (millions)
7	1	"The Black Book"	Roger Gartland	Daniel Boyle	8 September 2006	5.68
Based on The Black Book; Rebus finds himself drawn towards a cold case after a prostitute is buried alive beneath a famous Scottish landmark, but finds himself stonewalled when his prime suspect turns out to be a member of parliament – forcing his superiors to draft in a fellow DI to rein him in.
8	2	"A Question of Blood"	Matthew Evans	Matthew Evans	15 September 2006	5.25
Based on A Question of Blood; Rebus investigates a mass shooting at a local sports college, which has claimed the lives of two students and a teacher, but when one of the victims turns out to be his cousin's son, he decides that bending the rules is the best way to get a result.
9	3	"Strip Jack"	Matthew Evans	Robert Murphy	22 September 2006	5.81
Based on Strip Jack; Rebus investigates when the wife of a millionaire philanthropist, who is due to lead a conference on poverty in Africa, is found dead in the river, the morning after he is discovered with a prostitute in a local brothel during a raid by divisional CID.
10	4	"Let It Bleed"	Roger Gartland	David Kane	29 September 2006	5.70
Based on Let It Bleed; Rebus takes on the case of a man who shoots himself during a meeting with the head of his local bank, but a photograph in his wallet leads him to a chemical plant preparing a pesticide for the third world, and a disgruntled ex-employee with a grudge over a false sexual assault claim.

=== Series 4 (2007) ===
No. overall	No. in series	Title	Directed by	Written by	Original release date	Viewers (millions)
11	1	"Resurrection Men"	Roger Gartland	David Kane	5 October 2007	4.81
Based on Resurrection Men; Rebus is forced to attend a training course at police school following a public outburst, with his colleagues unaware that he is actually out to expose two corrupt police officers who have been running a protection racket, and could possibly be linked to the murder of a drug dealer.
12	2	"The First Stone"	Morag Fullerton	Colin Bateman	12 October 2007	5.18
Based on "The First Stone"; Rebus is called to investigate when the naked body of the Moderator Elect of the Church of Scotland is found in a local cruising spot with the body of a naked woman. Forced to deal with ongoing political battles between the church and its ministers, Rebus must solve the case in time for the gathering of the General Assembly.
13	3	"The Naming of the Dead"	Martyn Friend	David Kane	26 October 2007	4.74
Based on The Naming of the Dead; Rebus investigates when an unidentified body is found in the grounds of a local Edinburgh hotel which is due to play host to the World Trade Summit. When another body is found in the grounds of Edinburgh castle, Special Branch intervene and warn Rebus off the case.
14	4	"Knots and Crosses"	Roger Gartland	Roger Gartland	7 December 2007	4.94
Based on Knots and Crosses; Rebus finds himself being investigated by an old friend after a murderer walks free on a technicality. Matters are made worse when the suspect and his brother are found dead, and the prosecutor in the case is found to have been paid off to discredit Rebus and his colleagues.
