= Claire Price =

English actress (born 1972)

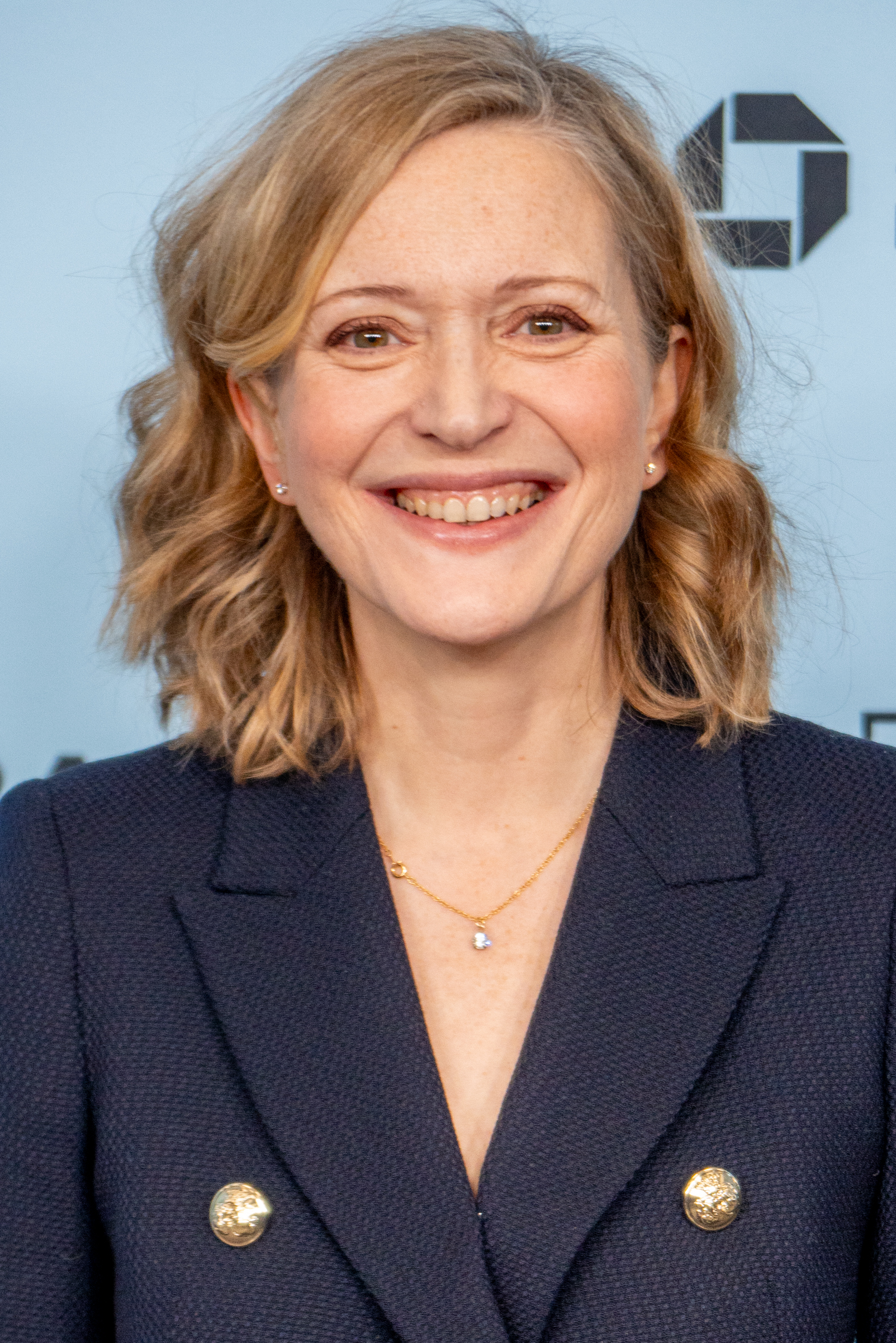
- Price at the 2025 Sundance Film Festival
- Born: Claire Louise Price; 4 July 1972 (age 54); Chesterfield, Derbyshire, England
- Occupation: Actress
- Years active: 1994–present

Claire Louise Price (born 4 July 1972) is an English actress. Her stage credits are extensive, her film and television credits include The Whistle-Blower (2001), Midsomer Murders episode "Tainted Fruit" (2001), Agatha Christie's Poirot episode "The Hollow" (2004), Rosemary and Thyme (2004), Rebus (2006–2007), Dalziel and Pascoe (2006), The Coroner (2015), The Second Best Exotic Marigold Hotel (2015), and Home Fires (2015–2016), and The Capture (2022).

== Life and career ==
Price was born in Chesterfield, Derbyshire. Her parents, John Price and Andree Evans, also acted. Her grandfather was the Worcestershire cricketer John Price. Her nephew is actor Charlie Rowe.

She is known for her portrayal as DS Siobhan Clarke in the TV drama Rebus (2006–2007) broadcast on the ITV network. She played opposite Ken Stott (DI John Rebus) in the adaptations of the Inspector Rebus novels by Scottish author Ian Rankin. In 2015, Price also played the role of Miriam Brindsley in ITV's World War II TV series Home Fires (2015–2016).

Previous television work include one-episode roles in many other long-running crime drama series including London's Burning, The Knock, Dalziel and Pascoe, Rosemary and Thyme, Apparitions, Doctors, Agatha Christie's Poirot The Hollow, Midsomer Murders Tainted Fruit,Murder in Mind, The Whistle-Blower, The Outcast, Capital, and The Coroner.

Price has also worked in classical theatre. She played Olivia in the 2003 multi-cultural adaptation of Shakespeare's Twelfth Night at Liverpool Playhouse. Her other Shakespearean roles have included Beatrice in Much Ado About Nothing at the Sheffield Crucible, Miranda in The Tempest at the Old Vic, and Rosalind in As You Like It at Manchester Royal Exchange. At the Royal National Theatre, she played Berinthia in The Relapse (2001) and Roxanne in Cyrano de Bergerac (2004).

In 2008, she played Ellida in Lady from the Sea at the Birmingham Repertory Theatre, and in 2009 she took the roles of Amanda in Private Lives at the Hampstead Theatre, Queen Elizabeth I in Mary Stuart at Theatr Clwyd, directed by Terry Hands, and as a journalist in The Power of Yes at the National Theatre.

In 2009, she appeared in The First Domino at Brighton Festival Fringe.

She had a supporting role in The Second Best Exotic Marigold Hotel (2015).

Price played the lead role of Petruchia in the RSC's staging of The Taming of the Shrew at The Royal Shakespeare Theatre in Stratford-upon-Avon.

In summer 2025, Price appeared as Lydia in Terence Rattigan's In Praise of Love at the Orange Tree Theatre, Richmond. In 2026, she played Vanessa Bell in the West End play The Standard of Living.

By November 2026, she was cast in the play The Popinjay Cavalier, directed by Quentin Tarantino.

== Honours and awards ==
Price won the award for "Best Supporting Performance" at the 2011 UK Theatre Awards for her role in The Pride at the Crucible in Sheffield. She won Best Actress for her role as Alice in Jump at The British Independent Film Festival 2012.
