= Ken Stott =

Scottish actor (born 1954)

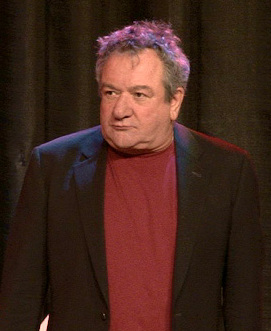
- Stott at the Hobbitcon II convention in Bonn, Germany 2014
- Born: Kenneth Campbell Stott; 19 October 1954 (age 72); Edinburgh, Scotland
- Education: Mountview Academy of Theatre Arts
- Occupation: Actor
- Years active: 1974–present
- Known for: Rebus (2000–2007); Takin' Over the Asylum (1994); The Missing (2014); The Hobbit film trilogy (2012–2014); An Inspector Calls (2015)
- Spouse: Nina Gehl (m. 2016)
- Children: 1
- Awards: BAFTA Scotland (twice); Laurence Olivier (once)

Kenneth Campbell Stott (born 19 October 1954) is a Scottish stage, television, and film actor. His most notable roles include the title character DI John Rebus in the crime fiction-mystery series Rebus (2006–2007) and DCI Red Metcalfe in Messiah (2001–2005). Stott also appeared as the dwarf Balin in The Hobbit film trilogy (2012–2014).

Stott received a Laurence Olivier Award for Best Actor in a Supporting Role for the 1995 play Broken Glass at the Royal National Theatre. For his role as Ian Garrett in the 2014 BBC TV mini-series The Missing alongside James Nesbitt, Stott was nominated for a BAFTA Award for Best Actor in a Supporting Role and the BAFTA Scotland Award for Best Actor in Television, winning the latter.

== Early life and education ==
Kenneth Campbell Stott was born in Edinburgh, Scotland on 19 October 1954. His mother, Antonia (née Sansica), was a Sicilian lecturer, his father, David Stott, was a Scottish teacher and educational administrator. Stott was educated at George Heriot's School in Lauriston, Edinburgh. For three years in his youth he fronted a pop band, but left to pursue his career in acting.

After attending Mountview Academy of Theatre Arts in London, Stott began working in the theatre for the Royal Shakespeare Company (RSC), but for some years his earnings from acting were minimal and he was forced to support himself by also working as a double glazing salesman.

== Career ==
=== Theatre ===
Stott's career began in 1974 at the Lyric Theatre, Belfast. His early work in theatre included a notable leading role in the dramatisation of Dominic Behan's play about the Northern Ireland troubles The Folk Singer, where he also played the part of Judas in the first regional production of Jesus Christ Superstar directed by Michael Poynor (1973).

In 1996, he created the leading role in The Prince's Play, a translation and adaptation by Tony Harrison of Victor Hugo's Le Roi s'amuse, for the National Theatre, London, 1996. In 1997, he was nominated for the Laurence Olivier Award for Best Actor for his role in the Yasmina Reza play Art, in which he appeared with Albert Finney and Tom Courtenay at Wyndham's Theatre.

In 2008 Stott starred in another West End production of a Reza play, this time God of Carnage, alongside Tamsin Greig, Janet McTeer and Ralph Fiennes at the Gielgud Theatre. He starred in a revival of Arthur Miller's A View From The Bridge at the Duke of York's Theatre in early 2009, and reprised his role of Michael in God of Carnage on Broadway (as a replacement for James Gandolfini) at the Bernard B. Jacobs Theatre in New York.

He returned to the Duke of York's Theatre in 2016 to play " Sir" (alongside Reece Shearsmith) in Ronald Harwood's The Dresser.

=== Television and Film ===
Stott appeared in BBC series Secret Army (1977), The Complete Dramatic Works of William Shakespeare (King Lear, 1982), and Dennis Potter's The Singing Detective (1986). He also featured in an advert for the British COI's "Drinking And Driving Wrecks Lives" campaign, playing a fireman.

His television roles have included hospital radio DJ Eddie McKenna in BBC Scotland's Takin' Over The Asylum, the leading character, DCI Red Metcalfe, in the BBC crime drama series Messiah (BBC One, 2001–05); DI Chappell in ITV police drama The Vice (1999–2003); as a drunk who fantasises about finding redemption by joining the Salvation Army in Promoted to Glory (ITV, 2003); as Adolf Hitler in Uncle Adolf (ITV, 2005), and as a fictional Chancellor of the Exchequer in Richard Curtis's The Girl in the Café (BBC One, 2005). 2006 saw him take over the title character in detective series Rebus, a television adaptation of the Ian Rankin novels which had previously starred John Hannah. In 2021, he appeared as Chief Superintendent Bob Toal in the police procedural Crime.

In 2008 Stott was nominated for a Scottish BAFTA for his performance as comedian Tony Hancock in BBC Four's Hancock and Joan. He played the father of cookery writer Nigel Slater in the BBC One adaptation of Slater's autobiographical novel Toast, opposite Helena Bonham Carter and Freddie Highmore. In 2015, Stott played Arthur Birling in Helen Edmundson's BBC TV adaptation of J. B. Priestley's An Inspector Calls.

On the big screen, he has tended to play mostly supporting parts, such as DI McCall in Shallow Grave (1994), Ted in Fever Pitch (1997), Marius Honorius in King Arthur (2004), an Israeli arms merchant in Charlie Wilson's War (2007), and Trufflehunter, a badger loyal to Prince Caspian in The Chronicles of Narnia: Prince Caspian (2008). However, he has had occasional starring roles in the cinema, most notably opposite Billy Connolly and Iain Robertson in The Debt Collector (1999), and Plunkett and Macleane of the same year. Most recently, he has starred as Balin in the live-action adaptation of The Hobbit, and played the role to critical acclaim. Stott played a supporting role as Dexter Mayhew's father in One Day (2011) starring Anne Hathaway and Jim Sturgess.

He narrated for the series Send in the Dogs, following the work of UK Police Officers and their canine partners.

== Personal life ==
Stott has a son, David (born 1985), by his first marriage, which ended in divorce. He married his long-time partner, the artist Nina Gehl, in 2016.

Stott is a supporter of Heart of Midlothian Football Club.

== Filmography ==
Year	Title	Role	Notes
1988	For Queen and Country	Civil Servant	
1993	Franz Kafka's It's a Wonderful Life	Woland the Knifeman	Short film
1993	Being Human	Gasper Diez	
1994	Shallow Grave	DI McCall	
1996	Saint-Ex	Prevot	
1996	A Mug's Game	McCaffrey	
1997	The Boxer	Ike Weir	
1997	Fever Pitch	Ted, the Headmaster	
1999	The Debt Collector	Gary Keltie	
1999	Plunkett & Macleane	General Chance	
2000	The Miracle Maker	Simon Peter	Voice only
2003	I'll Sleep When I'm Dead	Frank Turner	
2004	King Arthur	Marius Honorius	
2004	Spivs	Jack	
2005	Casanova	Dalfonso	
2005	The Girl in the Café	Chancellor	
2005	The Mighty Celt	Good Joe	
2007	Charlie Wilson's War	Zvi Rafiah	
2008	The Chronicles of Narnia: Prince Caspian	Trufflehunter	Voice only
2011	The Runaway	Joey Pasqualino	
2011	One Day	Steven Mayhew	
2012	The Hobbit: An Unexpected Journey	Balin	
2013	The Hobbit: The Desolation of Smaug	Balin	
2014	The Hobbit: The Battle of the Five Armies	Balin	
2014	Man Up	Bert	
2016	Café Society	Marty Dorfman	
2016	100 Streets	Terence	
2018	The Mercy	Stanley Best	
2018	Strike	The Boss	Animated film; voice only
2021	The Dig	Charles Phillips	

== Television ==
Year	Title	Role	Notes
1977	Secret Army	Baroja	Episode: "Child's Play"
1982	BBC Television Shakespeare	Curan	Episode: King Lear
1985	Taggart	Dr. MacNaughten	Episode: "Murder in Season"
1986	The Singing Detective	Uncle John	2 episodes
1988	London's Burning	Cyril	First episode
1990	Your Cheatin' Heart	Fraser Boyle	Miniseries
1991	All Good Things	Lawrence Wilson	5 episodes
1993	Anna Lee	Bernie Schiller	TV film
1994	Takin' Over the Asylum	Eddie McKenna	
1995	The Bill	Brian	Episode: "The Lives of Brian"
1996	Silent Witness	Sergeant Bob Claire	Episode: "Darkness Visible"
1996	Rhodes	Barney Barnato	6 episodes
1997	Screen Two	Redfern	Episode: "Stone, Scissors, Paper"
1999	Dockers	Tommy Walton	TV film
1999	Vicious Circle	Martin Cahill	TV film
1999–2003	The Vice	DI Pat Chappel	22 episodes Nominated-British Academy Television Award for Best Actor
2000–2007	Rebus	DI John Rebus	10 episodes
2001	Messiah	DCI Red Metcalfe	Miniseries
2002	Messiah 2: Vengeance is Mine	DCI Red Metcalfe	Miniseries
2004	Messiah 3: The Promise	DCI Red Metcalfe	Miniseries
2005	Messiah: The Harrowing	DCI Red Metcalfe	Miniseries
2005	Uncle Adolf	Adolf Hitler	TV film
2008	Hancock and Joan	Tony Hancock	TV film Scottish BAFTA for Best Acting Performance in Television Nominated–British Academy Television Award for Best Actor
2010	Toast	Alan Slater	TV film
2014	The Missing	Ian Garrett	5 episodes Nominated–British Academy Television Award for Best Supporting Actor
2015	An Inspector Calls	Arthur Birling	TV film
2016	War & Peace	Bazdeev	2 episodes
2017	Fortitude	Erling Munk	Season 2
2021-2023	Crime	Chief Superintendent Bob Toal	

== Awards and nominations ==
=== BAFTA TV Awards ===
0 win, 3 nominations

British Academy Television Awards
Year	Nominated work	Category	Result	Ref.
2001	The Vice	2001 British Academy Television Award for Best Actor	Nominated	
2009	Hancock and Joan	2009 British Academy Television Award for Best Actor	Nominated	
2015	The Missing	2015 British Academy Television Award for Best Supporting Actor	Nominated	

=== BAFTA Scotland Awards ===
2 win, 2 nominations

BAFTA Scotland
Year	Nominated work	Category	Result	Ref.
2009	Hancock and Joan	2009 British Academy Scotland Awards for Best Actor in Television	Won	
2015	The Missing	2015 British Academy Scotland Awards Best Actor in Television	Won	

=== Laurence Olivier Awards ===
1 win, 4 nominations

Laurence Olivier Award
Year	Nominated work	Category	Result	Ref.
1992	The Recruiting Officer at the National Theatre	1992 Laurence Olivier Awards Best Actor in a Supporting Role	Nominated	
1995	Broken Glass at the National Theatre Lyttelton / Duke of York's	1995 Laurence Olivier Awards Best Actor in a Supporting Role	Won	
1997	Art at Wyndham's Theatre	Laurence Olivier Award for Best Actor	Nominated	
2010	A View from the Bridge as Eddie Carbone at the Duke of York's	2010 Laurence Olivier Awards Best Actor in a Lead Role	Nominated	

=== Royal Television Society ===
0 wins 1 nomination

Royal Television Society
Year	Nominated work	Category	Result
2002	The Vice	Royal Television Society Award Best Actor	Nominated
