= List of works by Mike Leigh =

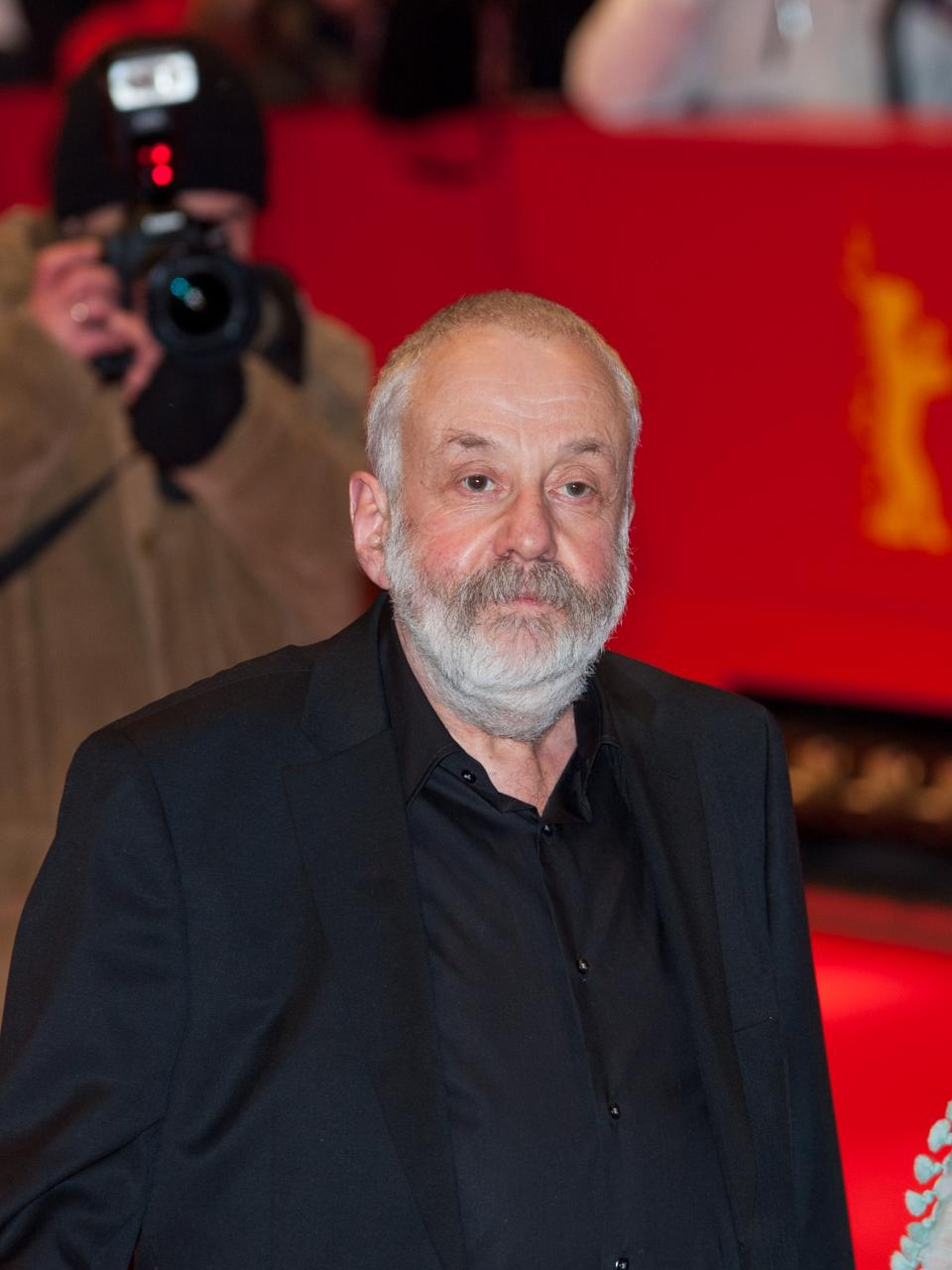
Mike Leigh at the 2012 Berlin International Film Festival

Mike Leigh is an English director and writer known for his work in film, television and stage.

== Film ==
Year	Title	Director	Writer	Distribution	Ref.
1971	Bleak Moments	Yes	Yes	BBC Films	
1983	Meantime	Yes	Yes	Premiered at London Film Festival; Screened on Channel 4	
1985	Four Days in July	Yes	Yes	BBC Films	
1988	High Hopes	Yes	Yes	Palace Pictures	
1990	Life Is Sweet	Yes	Yes	Palace Pictures	
1993	Naked	Yes	Yes	First Independent Films	
1996	Secrets & Lies	Yes	Yes	FilmFour Distributors	
1997	Career Girls	Yes	Yes	FilmFour Distributors	
1999	Topsy-Turvy	Yes	Yes	Pathé Distribution	
2002	All or Nothing	Yes	Yes	UGC Films UK	
2004	Vera Drake	Yes	Yes	Momentum Pictures	
2008	Happy-Go-Lucky	Yes	Yes	Momentum Pictures	
2010	Another Year	Yes	Yes	Momentum Pictures	
2014	Mr. Turner	Yes	Yes	Momentum Pictures	
2018	Peterloo	Yes	Yes	Entertainment One/Amazon	
2024	Hard Truths	Yes	Yes	StudioCanal	
2026	Tender Loving Care	Yes	Yes	StudioCanal	

=== Short films ===
Year	Title	Director	Writer	Notes
1975 (broadcast 1982)	"The Birth of the Goalie of the 2001 F.A. Cup Final" "Old Chums" "Probation" "A Light Snack" "Afternoon"	Yes	Yes	5-part BBC series of short films entitled Five Minute Films
1987	"The Short and Curlies"	Yes	Yes	Screened on Channel 4
1992	"A Sense of History"	Yes	No	Screened on Channel 4
2012	"A Running Jump"	Yes	Yes	Released 24 June 2012 (UK)

=== Acting roles ===
- West Eleven (1963) – Uncredited
- Two Left Feet (1965) – Uncredited

== Television ==
=== Plays ===
Year	Title	Director	Writer	Notes
1973-1982	Play for Today	Yes	Yes	6 episodes, including: Hard Labour; Nuts in May; The Kiss of Death; Abigail's Party; Home Sweet Home
1975	Second City Firsts	Yes	Yes	2 episodes: The Permissive Society; Knock for Knock
1980	BBC2 Playhouse	Yes	Yes	Episode: Grown-Ups

=== Series ===
Year	Title	Director	Writer	Notes
1963	Maigret	No	No	Actor: "Paul"; Episode: "The Flemish Shop"
1973	Scene	Yes	Yes	Episode: "A Mug's Game?" (8 March 1973)
2009	Teatr telewizji	No	Yes	Episode: "Przyjecie" (25 May 2009)

== Theatre ==
Year	Title	Venue
1965	The Box Play	Midlands Art Centre, Birmingham
1966	My Parents Have Gone to Carlisle	Midlands Art Centre, Birmingham
1966	The Last Crusade of Five Little Nuns	Midlands Art Centre, Birmingham
1968	Individual Fruit Pies	East–15 Acting School, London
1968	Down Here Up There	Royal Court Theatre Upstairs, London
1969	Glum Victoria and the Lad with Specs	Manchester Youth Theatre
1970	Bleak Moments	Open Space Theatre, London
1971	A Rancid Pong	Basement Theatre, London
1973	Dick Whittington and His Cat	Royal Court Theatre Upstairs, London
1973	Wholesome Glory	Royal Court Theatre Upstairs, London
1973	The Jaws of Death	Traverse Theatre, Edinburgh
1974	Babies Grow Old	Royal Shakespeare Company
1974	The Silent Majority	Bush Theatre
1977	Abigail's Party	Hampstead Theatre
1979	Too Much of a Good Thing	Radio Play
1979	Ecstasy	Hampstead Theatre, London
1981, 1998	Goose-Pimples	Garrick Theatre, London; Judith Anderson Theater, Off-Broadway
1988	Smelling a Rat	Hampstead Theatre, London
1989	Greek Tragedy	Belvoir St Theatre, Australia; Edinburgh Festival; Theatre Royal, Stratford East
1993	It's a Great Big Shame!	Theatre Royal, Stratford East
2005	Two Thousand Years	National Theatre, London
2011	Grief	Cottesloe Theatre, London

== Recurring collaborators ==
The following is a list of actors which collaborated with Mike Leigh on an ongoing basis. The list only includes Leigh’s feature films.

Work Actor	1983	1988	1990	1993	1996	1997	1999	2002	2004	2008	2010	2014	2018	2024	2026
Work Actor	Meantime	High Hopes	Life is Sweet	Naked	Secrets & Lies	Career Girls	Topsy-Turvy	All or Nothing	Vera Drake	Happy-Go-Lucky	Another Year	Mr. Turner	Peterloo	Hard Truths	Tender Loving Care
Dorothy Atkinson							X mark	X mark				X mark	X mark		
Michele Austin					X mark			X mark			X mark			X mark	
Marion Bailey	X mark							X mark	X mark			X mark	X mark		X mark
Mark Benton						X mark	X mark	X mark							
Elizabeth Berrington				X mark	X mark				X mark			X mark			
Jim Broadbent			X mark				X mark		X mark		X mark				
Katrin Cartlidge				X mark		X mark	X mark								
Eileen Davies	X mark								X mark		X mark	X mark	X mark		
Phil Davis		X mark			X mark				X mark		X mark				
Edna Doré		X mark						X mark			X mark				
Karina Fernandez									X mark		X mark	X mark			
Vincent Franklin							X mark		X mark			X mark	X mark		
Marianne Jean-Baptiste					X mark									X mark	
Paul Jesson								X mark	X mark			X mark			X mark
Sam Kelly							X mark	X mark				X mark			
Sally Hawkins								X mark	X mark	X mark					
Alice Bailey Johnson												X mark		X mark	X mark
Oliver Maltman										X mark	X mark	X mark			
Eddie Marsan									X mark	X mark					
Lesley Manville		X mark			X mark		X mark	X mark	X mark		X mark	X mark			
Sinead Matthews									X mark	X mark		X mark			
Kate O'Flynn										X mark		X mark	X mark		X mark
Martin Savage							X mark	X mark			X mark	X mark	X mark		
Judith Scott		X mark							X mark			X mark			
Ruth Sheen		X mark			X mark			X mark	X mark		X mark				
Timothy Spall			X mark		X mark		X mark	X mark				X mark			
Imelda Staunton									X mark		X mark				
Alison Steadman			X mark		X mark		X mark								
David Thewlis			X mark	X mark											
Peter Wight	X mark			X mark					X mark		X mark	X mark			X mark

== Reception ==
Title	Rating	
Title	Rotten Tomatoes	Metacritic
Bleak Moments	—N/a	71 (7 reviews)
Meantime	89% (9 reviews)	69 (4 reviews)
Four Days in July	—N/a	—N/a
High Hopes	92% (13 reviews)	84 (12 reviews)
Life is Sweet	94% (16 reviews)	88 (18 reviews)
Naked	88% (60 reviews)	85 (21 reviews)
Secrets & Lies	96% (45 reviews)	92 (27 reviews)
Career Girls	88% (25 reviews)	76 (25 reviews)
Topsy-Turvy	90% (89 reviews)	90 (31 reviews)
All or Nothing	82% (93 reviews)	72 (31 reviews)
Vera Drake	93% (160 reviews)	83 (40 reviews)
Happy-Go-Lucky	93% (161 reviews)	84 (34 reviews)
Another Year	93% (170 reviews)	81 (36 reviews)
Mr. Turner	97% (193 reviews)	94 (44 reviews)
Peterloo	67% (162 reviews)	66 (34 reviews)
Hard Truths	95% (186 reviews)	88 (46 reviews)

Key
= A film on Rotten Tomatoes with a "Certified Fresh" rating
= A film on Metacritic with a "Universal Acclaim" rating
