= BBC2 Playhouse =

British anthology television series (1974–1983)

- Opening title card
- Genre: Drama, Anthology, television plays
- Country of origin: United Kingdom
- Original language: English

Original release
- Network: BBC 2
- Release: 13 March 1974 – 20 May 1983

BBC2 Playhouse is a British anthology television series of one-hour episodes produced by the BBC. Among its many performers were Helen Mirren, Daniel Day-Lewis, Judi Dench, Liam Neeson, Paul Scofield, Deborah Kerr, Ben Kingsley, Donald Pleasence, Brenda Blethyn, Peggy Ashcroft, Peter Sallis and Margaret Whiting.

It premiered in the UK on 13 March 1974 and ran until 20 May 1983. In Canada, the show aired on YTV.

== Productions ==
This table is based on records in the BBC Genome archive of the Radio Times and the BFI database.

Original UK transmission date	Title	Author	Producer	Director	Performers	Notes
13 Mar 1974	Sizwe Bansi is Dead	Athol Fugard, John Kani, Winston Ntshona	Graeme McDonald	John Davies	John Kani; Winston Ntshona	Adapted from the play.
6 Aug 1974	The Joke	Isaac Bashevis Singer, dramatised by Rhys Adrian	Irene Shubik	Voytek	Donald Pleasence; Hugh Griffith; Miriam Karlin; George Pravda; Milo Sperber	Repeated 26 May 1976.
13 Aug 1974	The Cafeteria	Isaac Bashevis Singer, dramatised by Rhys Adrian	Irene Shubik	Silvio Narizzano	Donald Pleasence; Oscar Homolka; Sara Kestelman	Repeated 19 May 1976.
8 Jan 1975	The Breakthrough	Daphne du Maurier, dramatised by Clive Exton	Irene Shubik	Graham Evans	Simon Ward; Clive Swift; Roy Boyd	Repeated 10 November 1976.
15 Jan 1975	Mrs Acland's Ghosts	William Trevor	Irene Shubik	Mike Newell	Sara Kestelman; John Bluthal; Eric Richard	
9 Jul 1975	Diane	David Agnew	Mark Shivas	Alan Clarke	Janine Drzewicki; Frank Mills; Paul Copley; Tim Preece; Peter-Hugo Daly; Oliver Maguire	Not billed as Playhouse in RT but listed by BFI.
19 Mar 1976	Kites	Don Shaw	Innes Lloyd	Christopher King	Hugh Burden; Tony Caunter; Richard Hampton; Nick Berry	
26 Mar 1976	An Accident of Class and Sex	Maggie Wadey	Innes Lloyd	Brian Parker	Peter Barkworth; Patricia Garwood; Sam Dale	Repeated 5 September 1977.
2 Apr 1976	A Martyr to the System	Andrew Davies	Innes Lloyd	Peter Smith	Mike Grady; David Hill; Peter Cellier; Peter-Hugo Daly; Linda Robson; David Garfield	
9 Apr 1976	The Button Man	Ewart Alexander	Innes Lloyd	Kenneth Ives	Robert Urquhart; Philip Madoc; Alan Lake; Brendan Price; Brendan Barry; Ellis Jones	
16 Apr 1976	Practical Experience	Alan Plater	Innes Lloyd	Bill Hays	Barry Foster; Terrence Hardiman; Jan Francis; Donald Gee	
23 Apr 1976	Dad	Don Taylor	Innes Lloyd	Don Taylor	Kenneth Haigh; Rosemary Leach; David Waller; Peter Howell	
30 Apr 1976	The Chauffeur	Denis Plimmer and Charlotte Plimmer	Innes Lloyd	Brian Gibson	Joe Gladwin; David de Keyser; Susan Engel; Martin Matthews; Charles Pemberton; Jeffry Wickham	Repeated 31 January 1977.
7 May 1976	Play Things	Peter Prince	Innes Lloyd	Stephen Frears	Jonathan Pryce; Nigel Hawthorne; Tony Haygarth; Trevor Laird	Adapted from the novel. Repeated 12 September 1977.
14 May 1976	Jumbo	Don Shaw	Innes Lloyd	Bill Hays	James Grout; John Fortune; Norman Rossington	
29 Sep 1976 to 3 Nov 1976	Playhouse: The Mind Beyond (6 episodes) - see separate article.					
12 Jan 1977	The Achurch Letters	Don Taylor	Rosemary Hill	Don Taylor	Siân Phillips; Gary Watson; Prunella Scales; Brian McGrath; Vernon Dobtcheff	
7 Nov 1979	School Play	Frederic Raphael	Richard Broke	James Cellan Jones	Denholm Elliott; Jeremy Kemp; Michael Kitchen; Tim Pigott-Smith; Jenny Agutter; John Normington; David Troughton	Repeated under Playhouse Special, 12 December 1981.
14 Nov 1979	Every Good Boy Deserves Favour	Tom Stoppard and André Previn	Mark Shivas	Roger Bamford and Trevor Nunn	Ian McKellen; Ben Kingsley; John Woodvine; Barbara Leigh-Hunt	First shown 9 May 1979.
21 Nov 1979	The Brylcreem Boys	Peter Durrant	Innes Lloyd	Roger Bamford	David Threlfall; Timothy Spall	Repeated 11 September 1981.
28 Nov 1979	An Affinity With Dr Still	David Snodin	Anne Head	Derek Lister	Nicholas Le Prevost; Tom Kelly; Robert Eddison	
5 Dec 1979	Home-Movies	Denis Cannan	Rosemary Hill	Philip Dudley	Frederick Jaeger; Clive Swift; Jonathan Caplan	
12 Dec 1979	Sweet Wine of Youth	Darrol Blake, from the letters and poems of Rupert Brooke	Cedric Messina	Darrol Blake	Graham Simpson; Paul Sherman; Monica Kendall; Matthew Marsh; Cyril Luckham; Tom Kelly; Christopher Guard	
19 Dec 1979	Speed King	Roger Milner	Innes Lloyd	Ferdinand Fairfax	Robert Hardy; Jennifer Hilary; Jack Galloway; Derek Martin; Desmond Llewelyn; David Quilter; Tony Caunter; Garrick Hagon; Jack McKenzie; Shane Rimmer; Allan Surtees	Repeated 24 June 1981.
12 Jan 1980	Pews	Chaim Bermant	Graham Benson	Barry Davis	John Bennett; Sydney Tafler; Will Stampe	
19 Jan 1980	Gentle Folk	Alexander Baron	Innes Lloyd	Rodney Bennett	Anthony Dutton; Christopher Strauli; Denholm Elliott; Sheila Ruskin; Frederick Treves; Rosalie Crutchley; Wendy Williams; Robert James	Repeated under Playhouse Special, 19 December 1981.
26 Jan 1980	Lifelike	John Challen	Anne Head	Peter Bartlett	Peter Clay; Alun Lewis; Matthew Guinness; Jennifer Lonsdale; John Ringham	
9 Feb 1980	The Enigma	John Fowles, adapted by Malcolm Bradbury	David Rose	Robert Knights	Michael Thomas; Barbara Kellerman; Elizabeth Spriggs; Nigel Hawthorne; Raymond Westwell; Andrew Downie; David Troughton; Neville Barber; John Franklyn-Robbins	From BBC Birmingham.
16 Feb 1980	Hesther for Example	Michael Sullivan	David Rose	Carol Wiseman	Geraldine James	From BBC Birmingham.
23 Feb 1980	Trouble With Gregory	Stephen Davis	Michael Wearing	John Glenister	Richard Pasco; Elizabeth Bell; Jeffry Wickham	From BBC Birmingham.
8 Mar 1980	The Best of Friends	Frederic Raphael	Anne Head	Derek Lister	Keith Barron; Aubrey Woods; Gerard Murphy	
15 Mar 1980	In Hiding	Don Taylor	Innes Lloyd	Don Taylor	Roger Burnett; Doreen Mantle; Denholm Elliott; Alan Rowe; Tim Pigott-Smith	Repeated under Playhouse Special, 28 Nov 1981.
22 Mar 1980	Rottingdean	Richard Crane	Anne Head	Mark Cullingham	Pat Heywood; Trevor Peacock; Roger Brierley	
18 Apr 1980	The Dig	James Robson	David Rose	Carol Wilks	Eric Allan; Jennie Stoller; Annie Hulley; Oliver Smith	From BBC Birmingham.
25 Apr 1980	Happy	Derrick Buttress	Peter Ansorge	Derek Lister	Paul Copley; Max Hafler; Tony Caunter; Ann Davies	From BBC Birmingham.
2 May 1980	Mary's Wife	David Cook	Peter Ansorge	Peter Jefferies	Robert Gillespie; Barbara Leigh-Hunt; Anna Cropper; Peter Birrel; Linda Robson	From BBC Birmingham.
9 May 1980	Games Without Frontiers	[[Mike Bradwell {{{last}}}]]	Peter Ansorge	[[Mike Bradwell {{{last}}}]]	Philip Jackson; Jim Broadbent; Eric Richard; Christopher Fairbank	From BBC Birmingham.
16 May 1980	The Unborn	Philip Martin	Peter Ansorge	Michael Custance	Jack Shepherd; Judy Parfitt; Granville Saxton; Richard Leech; Suzanne Smith; Mary Larkin; Philip Martin	From BBC Birmingham.
23 May 1980	Electric in the City	Tony Bicat	David Rose	Tony Bicat	Will Knightley; Stephen Murray; Sylvester McCoy; Gwyneth Strong	From BBC Birmingham.
30 May 1980	Blue Remembered Hills	Dennis Potter	Kenith Trodd	Brian Gibson	Colin Welland; Michael Elphick; Helen Mirren; Janine Duvitski; Colin Jeavons	First shown as a Play for Today on BBC1, 30 January 1979. Winner of the 1979 BAFTA Awards for Best Director and Best Play. Repeated 6 November 1986, and on BBC4 25 December 2004 and 5 June 2008.
6 Jun 1980	Thank You Comrades	Jim Hawkins	Graham Benson	Jack Gold	Ben Kingsley; Connie Booth; Richard Ireson; Clive Merrison; Gerard Murphy; Zienia Merton; John Bryans; Julian Fox; Michael Troughton; Bruce Boa; Bill Reimbold; Gordon Sterne	First shown on BBC1, 19 December 1978.
13 Jun 1980	Coming Out	James Andrew Hall	Kenith Trodd	Carol Wiseman	Anton Rodgers; Hywel Bennett; Michael Byrne; Lynda La Plante; Nigel Havers; John Normington; Roy Evans; Davyd Harries	First shown as a Play for Today on BBC1, 10 April 1979.
20 Jun 1980	Crest of a Wave	Douglas Livingstone	Graham Benson	Peter Bartlett	Denholm Elliott; Ian Hendry; Wendy Seely	First shown 18 September 1978 under Premiere 2.
20 Jun 1980	Freedom of the Dig	Peter Everett	Graham Benson	Terry Bedford	Peter Vaughan; David Collings; Alun Armstrong; Frank Mills	First shown 23 October 1978 under Premiere 2.
6 Jul 1980	A Walk in the Forest	Jeremy Paul	Carol Robertson	Jack Gold	John Alderton; Lynn Farleigh; Paul Freeman; Julian Fox; Dominic Allan	First shown as a Play for Today on BBC1, 14 May 1980.
13 Jul 1980	Halleluiah, Mary Plum	Rose Tremain	Rosemary Hill	Peter Hammond	Chrissy Iddon; Warren Clarke; Peter Arne	
20 Jul 1980	One of These Nights I'm Gonna Get an Early Day	Trevor Preston	Graham Benson	Peter Ellis	Bryan Marshall; Michael Gambon; Stephen Yardley; Toyah Willcox; Janine Duvitski; Ysanne Churchman	First shown 16 October 1978 under Premiere 2.
20 Jul 1980	Travellers	Stan Barstow	Graham Benson	Keith Evans	Paul Copley; William Biggs	First shown 9 October 1978 under Premiere 2.
3 Aug 1980	Dalhousie's Luck	Aeneas MacBride (Fulton Mackay)	Pharic MacLaren	Alan Cooke	Brian Cox; Anthony Bate; Ralph Arliss	From BBC Scotland.
10 Aug 1980	An Ordered Life	Stephen Deutsch	Rosemary Hill	Peter Smith	Colin Jeavons; Clive Swift; Andrew Lodge; Tony Sibbald; Alec Linstead; James Murray	
31 Oct 1980	Caught on a Train	Stephen Poliakoff	Kenith Trodd	Peter Duffell	Peggy Ashcroft; Michael Kitchen; Michael Sheard	BAFTA Best Single Play, 1981. Repeated on BBC1 14 April 1981, on BBC2 18 September 1989 and 5 May 2001, and on BBC4 20 January 2003 and 15 January 2006.
7 Nov 1980	The Fatal Spring	George Baker	Anne Head	Michael Darlow	David Sibley; Charles Dance; Michael Troughton; Aubrey Morris; Martin Friend; Jeffry Wickham; Christopher Coll; Hugh Morton; Davyd Harries; Bill McGuirk; Trevor Cooper	UN Media Peace Prize Award for Merit
14 Nov 1980	The Black Madonna	Muriel Spark, adapted by Russell Harty	Alan Shallcross	Michael Simpson	Helen Fraser; Al Matthews; Edward Peel	
21 Nov 1980	The Happy Autumn Fields	Elizabeth Bowen, dramatised by William Trevor	Rosemary Hill	Peter Hammond	Gillian Blake; Stephen Moore; Desmond Llewelyn; Christopher Guard; Alice Krige	
28 Nov 1980	Grown-Ups	Mike Leigh	Louis Marks	Mike Leigh	Lesley Manville; Brenda Blethyn; Lindsay Duncan; Sam Kelly; Janine Duvitski; Phil Davis	Repeated 9 September 1982.
5 Dec 1980	My Dear Palestrina	Bernard MacLaverty	Neil Zeiger	Diarmuid Lawrence	Eleanor Bron; Liam Neeson; Alec Sabin; J. G. Devlin	From BBC Northern Ireland.
12 Dec 1980	Shaping Up	Sarah Pia Anderson	Anne Head	Peter Bartlett	Veronica Roberts; Dinah Stabb; Gerard Murphy; Richard Wilson	
19 Dec 1980	Standing In For Henry	Malcolm Bradbury	Rosemary Hill	Michael Heffernan	Simon Cowell-Parker; Bill Nighy; Donald Gee; Brigit Forsyth; Chris Jagger	
9 Jan 1981	Fothergill	Robert Holles, based on a book by John Fothergill	Innes Lloyd	Claude Whatham	Robert Hardy; Lynn Farleigh; John Carson; Patrick Newell; Elizabeth Spriggs; John Bird; Sebastian Shaw; David de Keyser; Jeremy Sinden; John Franklyn-Robbins; Ivor Roberts; Arthur Bostrom; Daphne Oxenford; Arthur Blake	
16 Jan 1981	One Hundred and Eighty!!!	Rita May	John Norton	Jim Hill	Barry Hart; Peter Martin; Brenda Castle; John Lee	
23 Jan 1981	The Kindness of Mrs Radcliffe	Noël Coward, dramatised by Stanley Price	Alan Shallcross	Chris Menaul	Elizabeth Spriggs	
30 Jan 1981	A Last Visitor for Mr Hugh Peter	Don Taylor	Anne Head	Don Taylor	Peter Vaughan; Michael Pennington; John Gillett; Charles Kay; Iain Armstrong; Gary Watson	
6 Feb 1981	The Journal of Bridget Hitler	Beryl Bainbridge and Philip Saville	Anne Head	Philip Saville	Siobhán McKenna; Maurice Roëves; Julian Glover; Alan Chuntz; Denis Lill; Tim Woodward; Alan Haywood	
13 Feb 1981	Days at the Beach	Malcolm Mowbray	David Rose	Malcolm Mowbray	Sam Kelly; Stephen Bill; Mark Aspinall; Julie Walters; Christopher Ryan; Stephen Wale; Sharon Duce; Edward Peel	From BBC Birmingham. Repeated 5 July 1992.
20 Feb 1981	Bobby Wants to Meet Me	Janey Preger	Peter Ansorge	Tony Smith	Philip Sayer; Michael Angelis	From BBC Birmingham.
27 Feb 1981	Days	Eva Figes	David Rose	Michael Rolfe	Anna Calder-Marshall; Alec Linstead; William Fox; Terry Molloy; John Rolfe; Peter Blake	From BBC Birmingham.
6 Mar 1981	Clapperclaw	Jack Shepherd	Peter Ansorge	Michael Wearing	Lynn Farleigh; Maggie Steed; Lesley Clare O'Neill; John Savident; David Bradley	From BBC Birmingham.
13 Mar 1981	The Potsdam Quartet	David Pinner	Michael Rolfe	David Giles	Peter Eyre; Frederick Jaeger; Clive Swift; Jerome Willis	From BBC Birmingham.
20 Mar 1981	Unity	John Mortimer, based on the biography of Unity Mitford by David Pryce-Jones.	Louis Marks	James Cellan Jones	Lesley-Anne Down; Nigel Havers; Jeremy Kemp; James Villiers; Ernst Jacobi; Terence Alexander; Ingrid Pitt; Sarah Berger; Gertan Klauber; Brigitte Kahn	
27 Mar 1981	Sky Lark	Julian Bond	Chris Cherry	Chris Lovett	Wendy Morgan; David Sibley; Christopher Coll	
3 Apr 1981	Elizabeth Alone: Part 1	William Trevor	Ann Kirch	Brian Parker	Barbara Ferris; Gawn Grainger; Joss Ackland; Doreen Mantle; David Neal; Sylvia Coleridge; Harry Towb; Elizabeth Estensen; Ray Callaghan; Abigail Cruttenden; Simon Coady; Brenda Fricker	
10 Apr 1981	Elizabeth Alone: Part 2	William Trevor	Ann Kirch	Brian Parker	Barbara Ferris; Gawn Grainger; Doreen Mantle; David Neal; Ian Marter; Sylvia Coleridge; Simon Coady; Brenda Fricker; Henry Stamper; Richard Steele; Hana Maria Pravda; Yolande Palfrey	
17 Apr 1981	Elizabeth Alone: Part 3	William Trevor	Ann Kirch	Brian Parker	Barbara Ferris; Gawn Grainger; Sylvia Coleridge; Harry Towb; Elizabeth Estensen; Sylvia Coleridge; Simon Coady; Henry Stamper; Hana Maria Pravda; Yolande Palfrey; Richard Steele; Martin Fisk	
24 Apr 1981	The Man Who Almost Knew Eamonn Andrews	John Heilpern	John Norton	Peter Bartlett	Doug Fisher	
1 May 1981	You're All Right - How Am I?	William Douglas Home	Innes Lloyd	Paul Ciappessoni	Denholm Elliott; Michael Hordern	Repeated under Playhouse Special, 5 December 1981.
15 May 1981	The Day War Broke Out	Peter Tinniswood	Peter Ansorge	[[Mike Bradwell {{{last}}}]]	Kenneth MacDonald; Dee Anderson	From BBC Birmingham.
22 May 1981	Random Moments in a May Garden	James Saunders	Terry Coles	Bill Hays	Barry Foster; Zena Walker; T. P. McKenna; Donald Gee; Sheila Ruskin	
5 Jun 1981	Going Gently	Thomas Ellice, from the novel by Robert C.S. Downs	Innes Lloyd	Stephen Frears	Norman Wisdom; Judi Dench; Fulton Mackay; Stephanie Cole	BAFTA Best Single Play, 1982. Repeated on BBC1 24 August 1982.
10 Jul 1981	Marriage	Nikolai Gogol, English version by Eric Bentley	Ann Kirch	Michael Simpson	John Wood; Margaret Tyzack; Gawn Grainger; Norman Rodway; Stratford Johns; Dinah Stabb	
30 Oct 1981	Mrs Reinhardt	Edna O'Brien	Alan Shallcross	Piers Haggard	Helen Mirren; Brad Davis; Ralph Bates	
6 Nov 1981	Last Summer's Child	Susan Hill	Rosemary Hill	Giles Foster	Billie Whitelaw; Anthony Bate; Keith Jayne; Sarah Prince	Repeated 4 March 1983.
13 Nov 1981	Autumn Sunshine	William Trevor	Alan Shallcross	Rodney Bennett	Christopher Casson; Mary Larkin; Robert Hamilton	Repeated 25 February 1983.
27 Nov 1981	The Grudge Fight	John Hale	Rosemary Hill	Mike Vardy	Jamie Roberts; Michael Packer; Mark Wingett; Anthony Head; David Daker; Michael Goldie; Edward Peel; Michael Troughton; David John; Frank Mills	
4 Dec 1981	Virginia Fly Is Drowning	Angela Huth, dramatised from her novel	Anne Head	Mark Cullingham	Anna Massey; Noel Dyson; Richard Wilson; Bruce Boa; George Pravda; David Ashford	
11 Dec 1981	Findings on a Late Afternoon	Rose Tremain	June Roberts	Richard Martin	John Nettles; Joss Ackland; David Bradley; Betty Hardy	
18 Dec 1981	Dancing Country	Peter Buckman	Brenda Reid	Michael Darlow	Elsie Randolph; Nat Jackley; John Junkin; Rosamund Greenwood; Aimée Delamain	
8 Jan 1982	The Combination	Tim Preece	Rosemary Hill	Peter Hammond	Dorothy Tutin; Gary Raymond; Henry Milner; Julian Davies; John Bird; Tim Preece; Richard Davies; Noel Johnson	Repeated 18 February 1983.
15 Jan 1982	A Silly Little Habit	Carol Bunyan	Anne Head	Sarah Pia Anderson	Margaret Tyzack; Pauline Jameson; Nicholas Farrell; Nula Conwell	
22 Jan 1982	Aubrey	John Selwyn Gilbert	Rosemary Hill	Peter Hammond	John Dicks; Rula Lenska; Ronald Lacey; Roger Hammond; Sandor Elès; Dennis Edwards; Christine Kavanagh; John Baker	
29 Jan 1982	Preview	Sylvia Clayton	Rosemary Hill	Jon Amiel	Anton Rodgers; Anna Cropper; Cherie Lunghi; Will Knightley; Paul Seed	
5 Feb 1982	Out Of Step	Carol Bunyan	Terry Coles	Bill Hays	Jacqueline Tong; Carol Leader; Albert Welling	
12 Feb 1982	A Shilling Life	Guy Meredith	Rosemary Hill	Michael Heffernan	Eric Porter; Julie Covington	
19 Feb 1982	The Workshop	Jean-Claude Grumberg, adapted by Tom Kempinski	Carol Robertson	Nicolas Kent	Lynn Farleigh; Lee Montague; Paul Freeman	
26 Feb 1982	How Many Miles to Babylon?	Jennifer Johnston, adapted by Derek Mahon	Innes Lloyd	Moira Armstrong	Sian Phillips; Barry Foster; Alan MacNaughtan; Daniel Day-Lewis; Christopher Fairbank; Ray Callaghan	
5 Mar 1982	The Pigman's Protege	Thomas Ellice	Terry Coles	John Madden	Victoria Fairbrother; Patrick Troughton; Donald Gee	
12 Mar 1982	Pocketful Of Dreams	Jim Hill	Terry Coles	Stuart Urban	Michael Elphick; Philip Jackson; Wolfe Morris; James Marcus; Trevor Laird; Dicken Ashworth; Peter Benson; Clinton Greyn	Repeated 11 March 1983.
19 Mar 1982	Keeping in Touch	Allen Drury	Terry Coles	Terence Deyaney	Doug Fisher; Margery Mason; Frank Mills	
26 Mar 1982	The Guest	Pauline MacAulay, from a short story by Gerald Durrell.	Terry Coles	Paul Bamborough	Anton Rodgers; Judy Cornwell	Repeated 25 March 1983.
2 Apr 1982	The Sidmouth Letters	Jane Gardam, dramatised by Paula Milne	Terry Coles	Nicholas Renton	Jane Wymark; Patience Collier; Philip O'Brien; Fiona Walker	
16 Apr 1982	The Queen of Annagh	Terence Hodgkinson	Terry Coles	Jane Jackson	Diane Fletcher; Eamon Boland	
23 Apr 1982	By George!	Dennis Cannan	Rosemary Hill	Nicholas Renton	Benjamin Whitrow; Mary Wimbush; Carmen Munroe	
30 Apr 1982	Lunch	Elaine Feinstein	Rosemary Hill	Jon Amiel	Rosemary Martin; Jennifer Hilary	
7 May 1982	Passing Through	Rhys Adrian	Rosemary Hill	Desmond Davis	Ian Richardson; Lee Montague; Rosalie Crutchley	
14 May 1982	Jake's End	Desmond Lowden	Michael Wearing	Jim O'Brien	Maurice O'Connell; Coral Atkins; Christine Hargreaves; Derek Martin; Eric Mason; Richard Ireson; Alan Ford; Trevor Laird; Leslie Grantham; Jimmy Winston	From BBC Birmingham.
21 May 1982	Housewarming	Stephen Bill	Peter Ansorge	Robin Midgley	Penelope Nice; Nigel Bennett; Carolyn Moody; David Collings; Nicholas McArdle; Doña Croll	From BBC Birmingham.
28 May 1982	Easy Money	Michael Abbensetts	Peter Ansorge	Gillian Lynne	Gary Shail; Kim Thomson; Trevor Laird; Imelda Staunton	From BBC Birmingham.
4 Jun 1982	Potatohead Blues	Bill Morrison	Peter Ansorge	Michael Rolfe	Tony Rohr; Valerie Lilley	From BBC Birmingham.
11 Jun 1982	The Man Who Married a French Wife	Irwin Shaw, dramatised by Kenneth Cavander	Alan Shallcross	John Glenister		
11 Jun 1982	The Monument	Irwin Shaw, dramatised by Kenneth Cavander	Lindsay Law	Nick Havinga		A WNET New York production.
11 Jun 1982	The Girls in their Summer Dresses	Irwin Shaw, dramatised by Kenneth Cavander	Lindsay Law	Nick Havinga		A WNET New York production.
18 Jun 1982	Chains	Janey Preger	Terry Coles	Graham Theakston	Michael Elphick; Nicky Henson; Geraldine James; Barry Jackson; Linda Robson	
7 Jul 1982	Come into the Garden Maud	Noël Coward	Rosemary Hill	Cedric Messina	Geraldine McEwan; Paul Scofield	
9 Jul 1982	A Song at Twilight	Noël Coward	Rosemary Hill	Cedric Messina	Deborah Kerr; Paul Scofield	
14 Jan 1983	Fraulein Else	Thomas Ellice, from a story by Arthur Schnitzler	Terry Coles	Bill Hays	Georgia Slowe; Brewster Mason; Dominic Guard; Eileen Helsby	Not billed as Playhouse in RT but listed by BFI.
1 Apr 1983	Imaginary Friends	George Baker, adapted from a play by Robert King	Neil Zeiger	Michael Darlow	Peter Ustinov; Lilli Palmer; Roger Rees; Rosamund Greenwood; Amanda Leigh; Davyd Harries; Roy Evans; Cyril Cross	Not billed as Playhouse in RT but listed by BFI.
20 May 1983	Possibilities	Jonathan Raban	Innes Lloyd	Kenneth Ives	Tim Brooke-Taylor	Not billed as Playhouse in RT but listed by BFI.
Playhouse Presents
17 Feb 1980	The Lost Boys 1: We Set Out to Be Wrecked	Andrew Birkin	Louis Marks	Rodney Bennett	Ian Holm	First shown under Play of the Week, 11 October 1978. Repeated 27 December 1991.
24 Feb 1980	The Lost Boys 2: Dark and Sinister Man	Andrew Birkin	Louis Marks	Rodney Bennett	Ian Holm	First shown under Play of the Week, 18 October 1978. Repeated 28 December 1991.
2 Mar 1980	The Lost Boys 3: An Awfully Big Adventure	Andrew Birkin	Louis Marks	Rodney Bennett	Ian Holm	First shown under Play of the Week, 25 October 1978. Repeated 30 December 1991.
9 Mar 1980	Law and Order 1: A Detective's Tale	G. F. Newman	Tony Garnett	Leslie Blair	Derek Martin; Ken Campbell; Alan Ford; Billy Cornelius; Dominic Allan; Terry Walsh; Doug Sheldon; Geoffrey Todd; John Hogan; Stanley Price; Michael Sheard	First shown 6 April 1978. Repeated on BBC4 24 March 2009.
16 Mar 1980	Law and Order 2: A Villain's Tale	G. F. Newman	Tony Garnett	Leslie Blair	Peter Dean; Derek Martin; Alan Ford; Billy Cornelius; Steve Ismay; Doug Sheldon; Geoffrey Todd; Peter Craze; Martin Gordon; Reg Woods; John Cannon	First shown 13 April 1978. Repeated on BBC4 31 March 2009.
23 Mar 1980	Law and Order 3: A Brief's Tale	G. F. Newman	Tony Garnett	Leslie Blair	Ken Campbell; Peter Dean; Deirdre Costello; Derek Martin; Billy Cornelius; Peter Welch; Terence Bayler; Alan Ford; Martin Gordon; Peter Craze; Stanley McGeagh; Laurence Harrington; Eric Mason; Brian Hawksley; James Charlton	First shown 20 April 1978. Repeated on BBC4 7 April 2009.
30 Mar 1980	Law and Order 4: A Prisoner's Tale	G. F. Newman	Tony Garnett	Leslie Blair	Peter Dean; Deirdre Costello; Lloyd McGuire; Steve Emerson; Stanley McGeagh; Dominic Allan; Harry Landis	First shown 27 April 1978. Repeated on BBC4 14 April 2009.
13 Sep 1980	Langrishe, Go Down	Harold Pinter, based on the novel by Aidan Higgins		David Jones	Judi Dench; Jeremy Irons; Annette Crosbie; Harold Pinter; Margaret Whiting	First shown under Play of the Week, 20 September 1978. Repeated on BBC4 26 December 2002, and on BBC2 16 August 2005 and 11 February 2005.
12 Jun 1981	Big Blonde	Dorothy Parker, adapted by Ellen M. Violett	Ann Blumenthal	Kirk Browning	Sally Kellerman; John Lithgow	A WNET production

== See also ==
Other BBC2 drama anthology series include

- Theatre 625
- Theatre Night
- Thirty-Minute Theatre
- Screen Two
- Second City Firsts
- Stage 2
- Thursday Theatre
