= Home Sweet Home (1982 film) =

1982 film directed by Mike Leigh

Home Sweet Home is a 1982 television film devised and directed by Mike Leigh, for the BBC, 'about postmen, parenthood, social workers and sex.' It was Leigh's second collaboration with Play for Today producer Louis Marks, and cinematographer Remi Adefarasin, (after Grown-Ups), and with composer Carl Davis – the musical score featured a quartet of basses – (Davis had also provided the music for 1977s The Kiss of Death). It stars Timothy Spall (working with Leigh for the first time), Eric Richard, Tim Barker, Kay Stonham, Su Elliot, Frances Barber, Sheila Kelley, and Lorraine Brunning. It was first broadcast on 16 March 1982. The film was shot on location in Hitchin, Hertfordshire and has a 90 minutes duration.

== Synopsis ==
The story of three postmen; "Gordon Leach (Timothy Spall), a slothful couch potato who is in permanent dispute with his svelte wife Hazel (Kay Stonham), who has lost four stone," and who "is offering to entertain ... postman Stan (Eric Richard), when his shifts don't coincide with Gordon's." "Stan's wife ran off with another man when their daughter, Tina, was six. She is now fourteen. As the film progresses, Stan and his domestic arrangements assume a pivotal importance." The third postman Harold Fish (Tim Barker) and his wife June (Su Elliott), have a dead marriage. Stan is having an affair with June Fish.

== Critical reception ==
Clive James, then television critic of the Observer, praised Leigh's film: "The gripping story of three postmen and how practically nothing happened to them,..if you can imagine Cosi fan tutte with the music taken out, and then with the words taken out, and then with all the decor and costumes replaced by the tackiest fabrics and furniture known to mortal man, you've got a movie by Mike Leigh. That there should be two such original artists as him and Bill Forsyth loose in Britain at the same time is a remarkable thing." The playwright David Edgar was critical and wondered about Leigh's methods and techniques which produced "work of extraordinary, naturalistic perception; but it also appears to produce an attitude to the character of little more than rank contempt." Timothy Spall, (whose father was a postman, and thought the film 'pretty accurate') has said: "If you were to tell me you think Mike's patronising, I'd accuse him of the dead opposite: of elevating, and of making amusing and tragic, what most people in life go through."
