= Michael Packer =

Michael Packer may refer to:

- Mick Packer (born 1950), English footballer
- Mike Packer, English dramatist, actor and poet

== See also ==
- Michael Pacher (c. 1435 – 1498), Austrian painter and sculptor
- Michael Packe (1916–1978), English historian, biographer and cricketer
