= High Hopes (1988 film) =

- Directed by: Mike Leigh
- Written by: Mike Leigh
- Produced by: Victor Glynn; Simon Channing-Williams
- Starring: Philip Davis; Ruth Sheen; Edna Dore; Philip Jackson; Heather Tobias; Lesley Manville; David Bamber
- Cinematography: Roger Pratt
- Edited by: Jon Gregory
- Music by: Andrew Dickson
- Distributed by: Palace Pictures
- Release date: 24 September 1988
- Running time: 112 min
- Country: United Kingdom
- Language: English
- Budget: £1.2 million
- Box office: $1.1 million

High Hopes is a 1988 British comedy drama film directed by Mike Leigh, focusing on an extended working-class family living in King's Cross, London, and elsewhere.

The film primarily examines Cyril (Philip Davis) and Shirley (Ruth Sheen), a motor-cycle courier and his girlfriend, a gardener, along with their friends, neighbours, and Cyril's mother and sister.

Despite staying true to Leigh's down-at-the-heel, realist style, the film is ultimately a social comedy concerning culture clashes between different classes and belief systems. According to the critic Michael Coveney', "As in Meantime, High Hopes contrasts the economic and spiritual conditions of siblings. And in developing some of the themes in Babies Grow Old and Grown-Ups, it presents a brilliantly organised dramatic résumé of attitudes towards parturition and old age."

== Background ==
=== Previous work ===
Before High Hopes, director Mike Leigh had made Bleak Moments, released in 1971, and Meantime, released in 1983. This gap in his filmography was attributable in part to his process for creating films: When he applied for financial backing, he did not yet have finished scripts, preferring to allow actors, once they were hired, to use improv sessions to create the dialogue. As a result, given the absence of a concrete script, many potential financial backers were reluctant to support Leigh's work.

== Summary ==
=== Plot ===
The film centres on Cyril and Shirley, a loving London couple whose "badly-placed" optimism inspired the title of the film; they live in the King's Cross area of London. The plot centres on the interaction of Cyril and his family with members of England's different social classes, including his elderly mother, who lives in a gentrifying neighbourhood; Valerie, his "nouveau riche" sister; Laetitia and Rupert, his mother's upper-middle class neighbours; and a country traveller who stays with Cyril and whom they nickname E.T. because he repeatedly fails to make his way home. Both Cyril and Shirley are highly critical of then-Prime Minister Margaret Thatcher, and Shirley names one of her cacti after her.

The film's second half has been described as more thematically serious compared to the first half. One central event to the film is when Cyril's mother loses her keys, and she then is forced to rely on her wealthy neighbours and her children for assistance, displaying a stark contrast between the lifestyles of the different classes. At one point, Mrs. Bender's lexicon differs significantly from that of Laetitia, such as when the latter corrects her for using the term "toilet" as opposed to "lavatory" and when Laetitia tells Mrs. Bender "chop chop" when the latter is, in her view, taking too long to ascend the stairs to her house. Later, Valerie throws their mother an "indescribably vulgar" party for her 70th birthday.

=== Themes ===
One theme displayed throughout the film is that no two characters fully understand each other's perspectives or lives, with the sole exceptions of Cyril and Shirley. In a review for Sight & Sound, critic Gilbert Adair posits that the film's themes are akin to those of the writings of Auberon Waugh, in that both sought to portray the lifestyles of the working classes. However, Adair continued, whereas Waugh's goal was to encourage self-described liberal audiences to trust their inner fears of the working classes, Leigh's objective is to encourage audiences to instead trust their liberal ideals, not their fears of the working classes.

== Cast ==
- Phil Davis as Cyril
- Ruth Sheen as Shirley
- Edna Doré as Mrs Bender
- Philip Jackson as Martin
- Heather Tobias as Valerie
- Lesley Manville as Lætitia
- David Bamber as Rupert
- Jason Watkins as Wayne
- Judith Scott as Suzi

== Reception ==
=== Critical response ===
On the review aggregator website Rotten Tomatoes, 92% of 13 critics' reviews are positive, with an average rating of 8.3/10. Metacritic, which uses a weighted average, assigned the film a score of 84 out of 100, based on 12 critics, indicating "universal acclaim". Janet Maslin of The New York Times designated it as a "critic's pick" and commended it for being "enjoyably whimsical without ever losing its cutting edge". Roger Ebert of the Chicago Sun-Times awarded the film four out of four stars and concluded that it was "an alive and challenging film, one that throws our own assumptions and evasions back at us".

=== Box office ===
The film made £245,549 in the UK.

=== Awards and nominations ===
- European Film Awards
  - Won: Best Actress – Leading Role (Ruth Sheen)
  - Won: Best Composer (Andrew Dickson)
  - Won: Best Supporting Performance (Edna Doré)
  - Nominated: Best Film
- Independent Spirit Awards (USA)
  - Nominated: Best Foreign Film
- Venice Film Festival (Italy)
  - Won: FIPRESCI Prize (Mike Leigh)

== Bibliography ==
- Coveney, Michael (1996). The World According to Mike Leigh. London: HarperCollins. ISBN 978-0-00-255518-0.
