= Judith Scott =

Judith Scott may refer to:

- Judith Scott (artist) (1943 – 2005), American fiber artist
- Judith Scott (American actress) (born 1965), American television actress
- Judith Scott (British actress) (born 1957), British theatrical, film and television actress
