= Other People's Children (TV series) =

- Genre: Drama
- Based on: Other People's Children by Joanna Trollope
- Written by: Leigh Jackson
- Directed by: Pete Travis
- Starring: Denis Lawson; Lesley Manville
- Composer: Robert Lane
- Country of origin: United Kingdom
- Original language: English
- No. of series: 1
- No. of episodes: 4

Production
- Producer: Christopher Hall
- Camera setup: Single camera
- Running time: 50 minutes (each)

Original release
- Network: BBC One
- Release: 10 September – 1 October 2000

Other People's Children is a four-episode 2000 British television drama, adapted by Leigh Jackson from Joanna Trollope's 1998 novel of the same name. The series tells the story of how three women and two men deal with new marriages and the consequences of the new spouses or partners having to deal with their partner's children of different ages from previous marriages.

== Plot ==
When Josie (Emma Fielding) marries Matthew (Frank Harper), she already has a child, eight-year-old Rufus (Jacob Engelberg), from her previous marriage to Tom (Denis Lawson). But Josie's patient determination crumbles as Matthew's three children turn against both her and Rufus. Things seem at first to be a lot easier for Josie's ex-husband, Tom, an architect who has two other children besides Rufus (Tom's first wife died when his children were small). Tom has a new partner, the calm, reasonable high-management career woman Elizabeth (Serena Gordon), whom Rufus (who visits Tom regularly) seems to like rather well. However, it's Tom's 25-year-old daughter, Dale (Emilia Fox), who can't bear to see her father in love, and moves back in with him in order to disrupt the romance and their possible future marriage. Indeed, Dale had earlier managed to drive away Josie. Meanwhile, Matthew's former wife, Nadine (Lesley Manville), very bitter after the divorce and living on very little income, has moved to the countryside, taking over a half-dilapidated old house. Her children leave the relative comfort of their home in order to escape their father's new wife, Josie, only to find themselves in deprived circumstances. The story moves back and forth between Josie, Nadine and Elizabeth. The stories eventually play themselves out: Elizabeth breaks the relationship with Tom, Matthew's children come to accept Josie, and Nadine finally makes peace with her countryside existence, even being befriended by a local farmer, with implications of a possible future romance.

== Award nominations ==
For her role as Nadine, Lesley Manville was nominated for Best Actress in the 2001 Royal Television Society Awards.
