= My Brother Tom (film) =

2001 British film

DVD cover

My Brother Tom is a 2001 English independent film by Dom Rotheroe in his directorial debut.

== Cast ==
- Jenna Harrison as Jessica
- Ben Whishaw as David ("Tom")
- Adrian Rawlins as Jack, Jessica's drama teacher
- Honeysuckle Weeks as Sarah, Jessica's sister
- Michael Erskine as Ian
- Judith Scott as Jessica's Mum
- Richard Hope as Jessica's Dad
- Michael Tucek as Gang Leader
- Michael Power as Gang Leader's Sidekick
- Daniel Bliss as Gang Member
- Adam Paul Harvey as Gang Member
- Craig Vye as Gang Member
- Emily Barrett as Nicola
- Patrick Godfrey as Father Felix
- Jonathan Hackett as Tom's Dad
- Peter England as Max, Jessica's companion
- Elliott Tiney as Ade, Tom's friend
- Rosalind Whelas as Ade's girlfriend
- Glen Berry as Policeman
- Ian Thompson as Inspector

== Plot ==
British schoolgirl Jessica encounters "Tom", a schoolboy named David, who is being bullied by a gang of schoolfellows. A strange and adventurous boy, he calls her "Fee" and introduces her to his hiding place by the lake. Both attend Catholic schools; their priest is Father Felix, nicknamed "Father Fuckwit" for his obtuseness.

Her next-door neighbour Jack, who is also her drama teacher, makes unwanted sexual advances, amounting to rape. She is confused and seeks absolution but her confessor, Father Felix, fobs her off. Jessica's parents do not understand her mood change; they confine her to her bedroom. Her sister Sarah is supportive but Jessica does not respond. Tom comes to her window; they escape to his "burrow", and defy convention by munching wafers stolen from the priest. They tighten a crown of thorns around his head. They explore each other's bodies and develop an unspoken mutuality; they feel themselves to be twins: two parts of the same person. Tom returns to his home, where his father tends his wounds and coaxes him into performing a sexual act but he refuses violently and flees the house, never to return. Jessica observes through the window and is shocked.

Months pass, and it is Jessica's birthday and she encounters Tom again. They have a reunion at the "burrow". He now has piercings. He tells her how ashamed he felt, how he had tried to confess but his story is dismissed by Father Felix as a fabrication. He blames himself for the death of his mother ("so much blood") and reveals how he subsequently allowed his father to bugger him. Since leaving home he has been living rough, selling his body, crashing parties and taking drugs. They break into their church and play childish games. He inhabits the confession booth and she reveals how she was raped. They return past Jack's place; he comes out and Tom calls him out as a "perv". Jack threatens him and Tom runs off. He is hit by a passing car.

Then follows an interlude of dislocated scenes: Tom is by the lake. He removes his piercings and bathes. He mutters to himself, addressing Jessica. Then it is night time and she reluctantly follows him to a rave in the woods; all their old friends are there. They leave and make love in the burrow. He is hesitant, gentle and comforting and finally calm. Then it is daytime and a crowd has gathered around Jack's place and Tom is lying there, dead. Jack attempts to comfort her. Then it is early morning; she is in bed and Tom climbs up to her window. They proceed to the burrow; she pushes him and he falls lifeless. Then it is night and they are in the burrow. She splashes fuel around and sets their retreat on fire. She has inadvertently set fire to a hedgehog, perhaps the creature Jack once passed to her, injured, and she subsequently nursed. It is squealing with pain and she is distraught. Then he is on the ground. She is angry with him, saying "You never stop, do you . . . we were meant to always be together." He says "I had to do something . . . get it out, set you free . . . I should vanish forever . . . we will always live together, in each other's head." He climbs a wall and is gone.

The funeral service is intoned by Father Felix following a familiar formula. Jessica is still stunned, and sister Sarah enters the church and stands beside her. Astounded at the priest's hypocrisy, Jessica leaps at the coffin and drags it to the floor — "Leave him alone". She is ejected by Tom's father and the priest. She runs to the woods but the burrow is now cleared. She runs to the lake and falls in. As she sinks below the surface she is joined by Tom. The water's surface is undisturbed.

== Music ==
"Come On Eileen" by Dexy's Midnight Runners was used in a flashback scene.

== Recognition ==
My Brother Tom was awarded the Golden Rose at the 2001 Sochi International Film Festival.

It was awarded the Herald Angel at the Edinburgh International Film Festival.

Ben Whishaw was named "Most Promising Newcomer" at the 2001 British Independent Film Awards for his role in the film.

== Home Media ==
My Brother Tom was released in Australia (and perhaps elsewhere) as a DVD by Film 4.
