= High Season =

1987 film by Clare Peploe

- Directed by: Clare Peploe
- Screenplay by: Clare Peploe; Mark Peploe
- Starring: Jacqueline Bisset; James Fox; Irene Papas
- Cinematography: Chris Menges
- Edited by: Gabriella Cristiani
- Distributed by: Curzon Film Distributors
- Release date: September 1987 (BFI Southbank)
- Running time: 101 minutes
- Budget: £1.9 million

High Season is a 1987 British romantic comedy film directed by Clare Peploe. It is a comedy about tourism, set on the Greek island of Rhodes; vacationers from rich countries taking over the most spectacular scenery at the most desirable times of the year. There are nine principal characters, a mixture of English, Greek, and a Greek-American. It was written by director Clare Peploe with her brother Mark.

== Plot ==
Katherine is an English photographer who, with her husband Patrick, came to live at a coastal town on Rhodes before the tourists discovered it. Their thirteen-year-old daughter Chloe grew up there, and even though Kath and Patrick have separated, they have both stayed on. He supports himself through his sculpture pieces, which Kath despises, and she, by her photography books featuring antiquities and peasant life, which he finds fuddy-duddy.

Kath needs money; her latest book is not selling. She will be forced to give up her house and leave the island she loves unless she can find a buyer for a vase that was given to her many years earlier by a famous, now elderly art historian, Basil Sharp, who arrives for a visit. Katherine's widowed friend Penelope regards the tourists as enemies, an army of occupation, and battles with her son Yanni, who appreciates the prosperity the tourists bring.

Rick, a practical-minded Englishman, fixes Kath's toilet, and becomes smitten by Kath after she rewards him with a passionate kiss. His wife Carol occupies herself with Byron's poetry and the tourist-loving Yanni. The group is completed by Konstantinis, a wealthy Greek-American who wants to buy Kath's vase, but needs it to be declared a fake so that he can take it out of Greece.

== Cast ==
- Jacqueline Bisset as Katherine
- James Fox as Patrick
- Kenneth Branagh as Rick
- Lesley Manville as Carol
- Sebastian Shaw as Basil
- Robert Stephens as Konstantinis
- Irene Papas as Penelope
- Ruby Baker as Chloe
- Paris Tselios as Yanni

== Production ==
High Season was director Peploe's first major feature film. She had previously made the half-hour short Couples and Robbers. Married to Italian director Bernardo Bertolucci, she was one of the screenwriters on Michelangelo Antonioni's Zabriskie Point. She was credited as a writer and an assistant director on Bertolucci's La luna. Her brother Mark, with whom she collaborated on the script, previously wrote The Passenger for Antonioni, and the screenplay for The Last Emperor with Bertolucci.
