= King Cinder =

1977 British children's TV series

- Written by: John Prowse
- Directed by: John Prowse
- Starring: Peter Duncan; Lesley Manville
- Country of origin: United Kingdom
- Original language: English
- No. of series: 1
- No. of episodes: 6

Production
- Producer: Anna Home
- Production locations: Rye House Speedway, Hoddesdon, Hertfordshire, also Beauchamps Comprehensive, Wickford, Essex and Burnham-on-Crouch, Essex.

Original release
- Network: BBC1
- Release: 2 November – 7 December 1977

King Cinder is a six-part British children's television serial made by the BBC in 1977. It was first shown between 2 November and 7 December 1977 on BBC1.

A gritty series, King Cinder by John Foster, pitches two teenagers, played by Peter Duncan (Kerry) a speedway bike rider and Lesley Manville (Nicky) his girlfriend against a criminal gang running an extortion racket run by nasty Todd Edwards (Michael Hawkins) and Hells Angel Daniel Abineri in a South Coast fictional seaside town called Barton. The series concludes with a climatic ending where Edwards driving a red Austin Maxi chases a running Kerry through a quarry only to see Edwards crash over a cliff.

The executive producer was Anna Home.

== Cast ==
- Kerry Hutson – Peter Duncan
- Nikki – Lesley Manville
- Todd Edwards – Michael Hawkins
- Richard Hutson – Tony Caunter
- Trevor Hutson - Jeremy Arnold
- Lacey – Daniel Abineri
