= Bedtime Stories (1974 TV series) =

Bedtime Stories is an anthology series of six plays that were '1974 versions of well-loved tales' and intended as a sequel to 1972's Dead of Night. The series aired on BBC Two from 3 March 1974 to 7 April 1974. Writers for the series included Alan Plater, Nigel Kneale and Andrew Davies. The series was produced by Innes Lloyd and script edited by Louis Marks. Two episodes, "Sleeping Beauty" and "Jack and the Beanstalk", are believed to have been wiped.

1: Goldilocks and the Three Bears

- Cast:
- Charles Lloyd-Pack as The Narrator
- Angharad Rees as Miss Goldie
- Bryan Pringle as Arthur Burr
- Rosemary Leach as Ivy Burr
- Dai Bradley as Lennie Burr
- John Hartley as Simon
- George Waring as Harry
- Harold Goodwin as Joe
- Frank Mills as Mr. Mills

Written by Alan Plater. Directed by Jonathan Alwyn.

2: The Water Maiden

- Cast:
- Jeff Rawle as Colin
- Lisa Harrow as Marianne
- Freddie Fletcher as Liam
- Cheryl Hall as Linda
- Avril Elgar as Colin's Mother
- Graham Ashley as Councillor Phillips
- Paul Moriarty as Bob
- Brian Pettifer as Alan
- Rayner Bourton as Fox
- Martin Skinner as Fox's Friend

Written by Andrew Davies. Directed by Kenneth Ives.

3: Sleeping Beauty

- Cast:
- John Franklyn-Robbins as The Narrator
- Ciaran Madden as Clare Rawley
- Richard Morant as Stephen Grant
- Diana Quick as Anna Carpenter
- Esmond Knight as Vere Rawley
- Adrienne Corri as Constance Rawley
- Kathleen Michael as Bess Robson
- John Saunders as Bertram
- Anne Ridler as Dr. Harrington
- Richard Steele as Dr. Porter

Written by Julian Bond. Directed by David Maloney.

4: Jack and the Beanstalk

- Cast
- Martin Thurley as Jonathan Weir
- Stephanie Bidmead as Linda Weir
- Glyn Owen as Duggie Weir
- Peter Jeffrey as Nethercoat
- Keith Marsh as Skinner
- Miranda Hampton as Marcia
- Ian Haliburton as Mike
- Denis Gilmore as Fuller
- Will Stampe as Victor "Vic"
- Julie May as Dorrie
- Liz Smith as Miss Long

Written by Nigel Kneale. Directed by Paul Ciappessoni.

5: Hansel and Gretel

- Cast
- Raymond Francis as Harry
- Brenda Bruce as Gertie
- Gwen Watford as Irene James
- Michael Graham Cox as Chris
- Gillian Rhind as Jill

Written by Louis Marks. Directed by Roger Jenkins.

6: The Snow Queen

- Cast
- Peter Turner as Kay
- Veronica Roberts as Gerda
- Richard Butler as Major Burton
- Eve Pearce as Mrs. Burton
- Julian Holloway as Hale Patterson
- Fiona Walker as Brenda Patterson
- Lesley-Anne Down as Monica
- Andee Cromarty as Charlie
- Martin Howells as Derek
- Rosalind Elliott as The Robber Girl
- Garrick Hagon as Chris
- Natalie Kent as Mrs. Harris
- Margot Thomas as Samaritan

Written by John Bowen. Directed by Paul Ciappessoni.
