= Men of the World =

- Genre: Sitcom
- Created by: Daniel Peacock
- Starring: David Threlfall; John Simm
- Country of origin: United Kingdom
- Original language: English
- No. of series: 2
- No. of episodes: 12

Production
- Production locations: Manchester, Greater Manchester, England, UK
- Running time: 30 minutes
- Production companies: Alomo Productions; BBC Television

Original release
- Network: BBC1
- Release: 14 March 1994 – 30 August 1995

Men of the World is a 1990s BBC1 sitcom which starred David Threlfall and John Simm.

== Production details ==
Written by Daniel Peacock – who also appears as the character Gilby Watson. – Men of the World was directed by Terry Kinane and produced for Alomo Productions by Laurence Marks, Maurice Gran and Claire Hinson. Marks and Gran are successful sitcom writers in their own right.

Neither series has ever been repeated on UK terrestrial television, though was shown on Carlton Select sometime in the late nineties. However, it has not had a DVD release and appears to have largely been forgotten.

== Plot ==
Lenny Smart and Kendle Bains are flatmates and work together as travel agents in Manchester. Thirtysomething Lenny attempts, with the help of old friend Gilby, to turn sensitive 23-year-old Kendle into a "real man". In one episode, Kendle receives a telescope for a birthday present and subsequently ends up looking into all the windows opposite - Kendle believes that his neighbour has murdered his wife with a meat cleaver, but it turns out it was just a simple disagreement over 87 pounds of meat.

== Main cast ==
- David Threlfall ... as Lenny Smart
- John Simm ... as Kendle Bains
- Daniel Peacock ... as Gilby Watson
- Eva Pope ... as Becky (Series 2)
- Brenda Bruce ... as Mrs Daff

== Episodes ==
Series 1

1. "Match of the Day" (14 March 1994)
2. "The Assessment" (21 March 1994)
3. "Lost in France" (28 March 1994)
4. "The Big Fight" (11 April 1994)
5. "Team Table" (18 April 1994)
6. "The Runaway" (25 April 1994)

Series 2

1. "The Dice of Life" (26 July 1995)
2. "The Girl I Love" (2 August 1995)
3. "The Walking Wounded" (9 August 1995)
4. "Happy Birthday Kendle" (16 August 1995)
5. "Stolen Kiss" (23 August 1995)
6. "Farewell My Lovely" (30 August 1995)
