= David Threlfall =

English stage, film, television actor and director

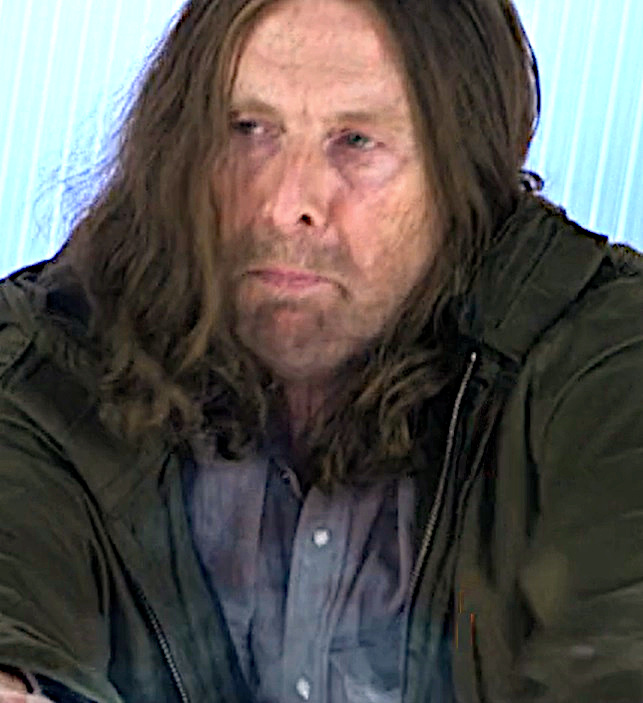
- Threlfall in character (c. 2013)
- Born: David John Threlfall; 12 October 1953 (age 73); Burnage, Manchester, Lancashire, England
- Occupations: Actor; director
- Years active: 1975–present
- Spouse: Brana Bajic (m. 1995)
- Children: 2

David John Threlfall (born 12 October 1953) is an English stage, film and television actor and director. He is best known for playing Frank Gallagher in Channel 4's series Shameless. He has also directed several episodes of the show. In April 2014, he portrayed comedian Tommy Cooper in a television film entitled Tommy Cooper: Not Like That, Like This. In 2014, he starred alongside Jude Law in the thriller Black Sea. In 2024 he played Paul Peveril in the six-part BBC drama Nightsleeper.

For his role in Nicholas Nickleby, he won the Laurence Olivier Award for Best Actor in a Supporting Role in 1980, which was followed by a second nomination in the Best Actor category in 2006 for Someone Who'll Watch Over Me. His role in Paradise Postponed (1986) earned Threlfall a nomination for the British Academy Television Award for Best Actor. In 2022, he was nominated for the Tony Award for Best Leading Actor in a Play for his performance in the Martin McDonagh play Hangmen.

== Early life ==
The son of Joyce Foulds and her husband, Tom Threlfall, a plumber, Threlfall was born in Crumpsall, Manchester, Lancashire. The family lived in Blackley, then moved to the Bradford area of Manchester and then Burnage when he was 8/9. His introduction to drama came from school and two English teachers, Alan Johnson and Frank Casey, at Wilbraham High School, where he was a contemporary of the younger Lorraine Ashbourne.

Threlfall studied at art college in Sheffield (now Sheffield Hallam University), but only stayed for a year. A few months of labouring and thinking followed. Having consulted a magazine in a public library which listed drama colleges, Threlfall successfully applied to the Manchester Polytechnic School of Theatre. By graduation, he had an audition with Mike Leigh.

Threlfall has been a supporter of Manchester City since childhood and was the voice over for the film played before every home game during the 2017–18 season.

== Career ==
Threlfall graduated from the Manchester Polytechnic School of Theatre. He has notched up a wide range of film and television credits since his 1977 acting debut in "The Kiss of Death" (Mike Leigh). He was in the original Play for Today version of the film Scum as the eloquent Archer. His television appearances include Trevor in Mike Leigh's 1977 made-for-TV film Kiss of Death, Leslie Titmuss in Paradise Postponed, and Edgar in the Granada Television production of King Lear (1983) opposite Laurence Olivier in the title role. He also had regular roles in the situation comedies Nightingales, and Men of the World, and guest appearances in dramas such as Cutting It, The Knock, CI5: The New Professionals and Spooks. He played Prince Charles in Diana: Her True Story (1993) and his father Prince Philip in The Queen's Sister (2005). Threlfall played the central character of Frank Gallagher in Paul Abbott's Shameless, shown on Channel 4 for 11 series between 2004 and 2013.

Threlfall also played the role of Friedrich Kritzinger in the BBC/HBO drama Conspiracy (2001), a dramatisation of the infamous Wannsee Conference. In 2006, he played the domineering husband of wartime diarist Nella Last, in the TV drama Housewife, 49. His film credits include John le Carré's The Russia House, Patriot Games, Master and Commander: The Far Side of the World, Elizabeth: The Golden Age alongside Cate Blanchett, and as John Lennon's Uncle George in Nowhere Boy.

Threlfall was in Gregory J. Read's 2006 film Like Minds and played John Colbie. He was also in Alien Autopsy and played the character Martin Blower acting alongside Simon Pegg and Nick Frost in the British comedy film Hot Fuzz (2007).

Threlfall starred in an episode of The Whistle Blowers. He starred as the lead role in the fifth episode of the BBC docu-drama series Ancient Rome: The Rise and Fall of an Empire as the Emperor Constantine I. Threlfall voiced the part of Iago in Othello for the Arcangel audio production of same. He also voiced the detective Paolo Baldi in BBC Radio 4's Baldi, and read Joseph Conrad's Heart of Darkness for a radio adaptation. He played Jack in When the Whales Came (1989), opposite Paul Scofield and Helen Mirren.

In 2013, Threlfall played retired London detective Len Harper in the short murder mystery BBC series What Remains alongside Russell Tovey and Amber Rose Revah.

In 2024, Threlfall starred alongside Noel Fielding in The Completely Made-Up Adventures of Dick Turpin.

=== Stage ===
In 1980, Threlfall played Smike in the eight-hour stage version of The Life and Adventures of Nicholas Nickleby for the Royal Shakespeare Company in both London and New York.

Threlfall's other notable stage performances include Riddley Walker, Oedipus, Macbeth, Your Home In The West and Peer Gynt "The Count of Monte Cristo" all at the Royal Exchange Theatre, Manchester, Bolingbroke in Richard II and Orgon in Tartuffe at the National Theatre in London. He received an Olivier nomination in Frank McGuiness' "Someone Who'll Watch Over Me" at the Ambassador's Theatre in 2005. He also appeared in Beckett's rarely performed "The Old Tune" with Niall Buggy, directed by Trevor Nunn at Jermyn Street Theatre in 2019.

In March 2016, Threlfall appeared as the lead in Don Quixote, at the Swan Theatre, Stratford, for the Royal Shakespeare Company, where he is an Associate Artist. The play was revived in 2018 at the Garrick Theatre in London. He is also a director of ATS (Artists Theatre School), started by Amanda Redman to help give young actors who cannot afford full-time drama school fees get exposure to training from industry professionals

== Personal life ==
Threlfall has been married to Bosnian actress Brana Bajic since 1995. They met in 1994, whilst working on The Count of Monte Cristo at the Royal Exchange Theatre in Manchester. They have two children.

Threlfall has said that despite his Shameless character being a chain smoker, in real life he is a non-smoker who has a dislike for nicotine.

== Filmography ==
=== Film ===
Year	Title	Role	Ref.
1990	The Russia House	Wicklow	
1992	Patriot Games	Inspector Robert Highland	
2001	Conspiracy	Friedrich Wilhelm Kritzinger	
2003	Master and Commander: The Far Side of the World	Preserved Killick	
2006	Alien Autopsy	Jeffrey (Film restorer)	
2006	Like Minds	John Colbie	
2007	Hot Fuzz	Martin Blower	
2007	Elizabeth: The Golden Age	John Dee	
2009	Nowhere Boy	George Smith	
2014	Black Sea	Peters	

=== Television ===
Year	Title	Role	Ref.
1977	The Kiss of Death	Trevor	
1977	Play for Today	Archer	Episode: Scum
1982	The Life and Adventures of Nicholas Nickleby	Smike	
1985	The Daughter-in-Law	Luther	
1986	Paradise Postponed	Leslie Titmuss	
1987	The Marksman	Don Weaver	Miniseries
1989	Frederick Forsyth Presents: A Casualty of War	Tom Rowse	
1990–1993	Nightingales	"Ding Dong" Bell	
1991	Titmuss Regained	Leslie Titmuss	
1991	A Murder of Quality	Stanley Rode	
1993	Diana: Her True Story	Prince Charles	
1994–1995	Men of the World	Lenny Smart	
1999	Sex, Chips & Rock n' Roll	Norman	
2000	Catherine Cookson's A Dinner of Herbs	Hal Royston	
2001	Conspiracy	Dr Friedrich Wilhelm Kritzinger	
2004	Cutting It	Beauregard Smee	
2004–2013	Shameless	Frank Gallagher	
2006	Housewife, 49	William Last	
2006	Afterlife	Ian Garland	
2006	Ancient Rome: The Rise and Fall of an Empire	Constantine	
2013	What Remains	DI Len Harper	
2014	Tommy Cooper: Not Like That, Like This	Tommy Cooper	
2015	The Ark	Noah	
2015	Code of a Killer	Detective David Baker	
2015	Midwinter of the Spirit	Rev Huw Owen	
2016	Ripper Street	Abel Croker	
2018	Troy: Fall of a City	Priam	
2019	Bing	Flop (voice)	
2020	Isolation Stories	Grandad	
2022	Dodger	Sir Charles Rowen	
2023	Passenger	Jimmy	
2023	Funny Woman	George Park	
2024	The Completely Made-Up Adventures of Dick Turpin	Tom King	
2024	Nightsleeper	Paul 'Pev' Peveril	
2025	Unforgivable	Brian Mitchell	
2025	The Death of Bunny Munro	Bunny Munro Senior	
2026	Harry Potter	Sorting Hat Voice	

== Theatre ==
- Blackie, The Sons of Light by David Rudkin for the Royal Shakespeare Company at The Other Place, Stratford-upon-Avon (1977)
- Jake, A&R by Pete Atkin for the Royal Shakespeare Company at the Warehouse Theatre, London (1978)
- Fitz, Savage Amusement by Peter Flannery for the Royal Shakespeare Company at the Warehouse Theatre, London (1978)
- Mike, Shout Across The River by Stephen Poliakoff for the Royal Shakespeare Company at the Warehouse Theatre, London (1978)
- Mark Antony, Julius Caesar at the Royal Shakespeare Theatre, Stratford-upon-Avon (1979)
- Slender, The Merry Wives of Windsor at the Royal Shakespeare Theatre, Stratford-upon-Avon (1979)
- Viktor, The Suicide by Nikolai Erdman for the Royal Shakespeare Company at The Other Place, Stratford-upon-Avon (1979)
- Smike, The Life and Adventures of Nicholas Nickleby adapted by David Edgar for the Royal Shakespeare Company at the Aldwych Theatre, London and then at the Plymouth Theatre, New York (1980)
- Apoo, Topokana Martyrs' Day by Jonathan Falla at the Bush Theatre, London (1983)
- Bolingbroke, Richard II at the Royal National Theatre, London (1985)
- Riddley Walker, Riddley Walker by Russell Hoban at the Royal Exchange Theatre, Manchester (1986)
- Hamlet for the Oxford Playhouse at the Edinburgh Festival (1986)
- Oedipus, Oedipus by Sophocles at the Royal Exchange Theatre, Manchester (1987)
- The Traveller by Jean Claude Van Itallie at the Haymarket Theatre, Leicester and then the Almeida (1987)
- Macbeth, Macbeth at the Royal Exchange Theatre, Manchester (1988)
- Bussy D'Ambois by George Chapman at the Old Vic (1988)
- Ian, Over a Barrel by Stephen Bill, Palace Theatre, Watford (1989)
- Gregers Werle, The Wild Duck by Henrik Ibsen at the Phoenix Theatre, London (1990)
- Micky, Your Home in the West by Rod Wooden at the Royal Exchange Theatre, Manchester (1991)
- The Count, The Count of Monte Cristo at the Royal Exchange Theatre, Manchester (1994)
- Lovborg, Hedda Gabler by Henrik Ibsen at the Chichester Festival Theatre (1996)
- The Count, The Rehearsal by Jean Anouilh at the Criterion Center (1996)
- Norman Nestor, Odysseus Thump by Richard Hope at the West Yorkshire Playhouse, Leeds (1997)
- Garry Essendine, Present Laughter by Noël Coward at the Royal Exchange Theatre, Manchester (1998)
- Peer Gynt by Henrik Ibsen at the Royal Exchange Theatre, Manchester (1999)
- Orgon, Tartuffe by Moliere at the National Theatre, London (2002)
- Robert, Blue/Orange by Joe Penhall at the Duchess Theatre, London (2001)
- Skellig by David Almond at the Young Vic, London (2003)
- Michael, Someone Who'll Watch Over Me by Frank McGuiness at the Ambassadors Theatre, London (2005)
- Don Quixote, Don Quixote adapted by James Fenton from the novel by Miguel de Cervantes at the Swan Theatre, Stratford-upon-Avon (2016)
- Cream, The Old Tune (Beckett Triple Bill) at Jermyn Street Theatre, directed by Trevor Nunn (2019)
- Harry Wade, Hangmen by Martin McDonagh at the John Golden Theatre (2022)
- Maurice Grosse, The Enfield Haunting (2023)
- King Lear, King Lear at the Royal Exchange Theatre, Manchester (2026)

== Accolades ==
Threlfall was awarded an Honorary Doctorate from Manchester Metropolitan University on 15 July 2013. An Honorary Doctorate from Sheffield Hallam University in 2014. He has a SWET (Olivier) Award, two TONY nominations and an EMMY nomination, The Clarence Derwent Award, five RTS Awards and a BAFTA for Housewife49 with Victoria Wood. He received two Sony Radio Awards for playing Spike Milligan in 2018 and Ken Dodd in 2020.
