= Derek Lister =

English cricketer

Personal information
- Full name: Derek John Lister
- Born: 25 August 1930; Norwood, Surrey, England
- Died: 27 November 1980 (aged 50); Northampton, Northamptonshire, England
- Batting: Right-handed

Domestic team information
- Years: Team
- 1951: Wiltshire
- 1954: Cambridge University

Career statistics
Competition	First-class
Matches	1
Runs scored	35
Batting average	17.50
100s/50s	0/0
Top score	31
Catches/stumpings	0/–
- Source: Cricinfo, 20 February 2019

Derek John Lister (25 August 1930 – 27 November 1980) was an English first-class cricketer.

Born at Norwood, Lister played minor counties cricket for Wiltshire in 1951, making two appearances in the Minor Counties Championship. He later studied at the University of Cambridge, where he made a single appearance in first-class cricket for Cambridge University against Middlesex at Fenner's in 1954. Batting twice during the match, Lister was dismissed by Ronnie Bell for 31 runs in the Cambridge first-innings, while in their second-innings he was dismissed for 4 runs by Charles Robins. He died at Northampton in November 1980.
