= The Box Play =

Play written by Mike Leigh

The Box Play is Mike Leigh's first stage play and was developed using the process of improvisation and collaboration with his cast that was to become the hallmark of Leigh's later work. It received its premier at the Midlands Arts Centre, Birmingham in 1965.
