= Lesley Manville =

English actress (born 1956)

Lesley Manville CBE
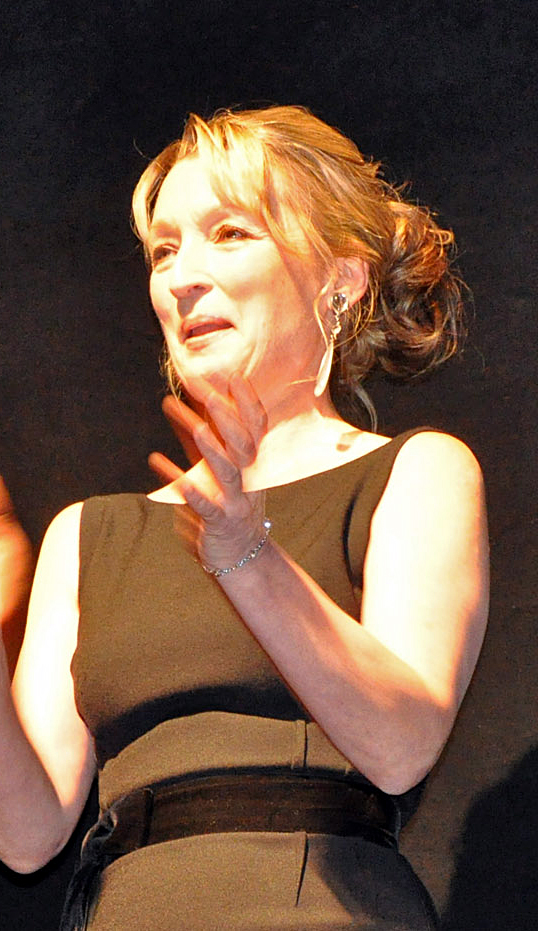
- Manville at the 2010 Toronto International Film Festival
- Born: Lesley Ann Manville; 12 March 1956 (age 70); Brighton, East Sussex, England
- Education: Italia Conti Academy of Theatre Arts
- Years active: 1972–present
- Spouses: Gary Oldman (m. 1987; div. 1990); Joe Dixon (m. 2000; div. 2004)
- Children: 1

Lesley Ann Manville (born 12 March 1956) is an English actress. Known for her performances on stage and screen, her accolades include a Tony Award and two Laurence Olivier Awards, in addition to nominations for an Academy Award, two British Academy Film Awards, five British Academy Television Awards, a Golden Globe Award and a Primetime Emmy Award.

She has acted in eight of Mike Leigh's films, including Grown-Ups (1980), High Hopes (1988), Secrets & Lies (1996), Topsy-Turvy (1999), All or Nothing (2002), Vera Drake (2004), Another Year (2010) and Mr. Turner (2014). For her role in the Paul Thomas Anderson romance drama Phantom Thread (2017) she was nominated for an Academy Award and BAFTA Award for Best Supporting Actress. She has also acted in the films Dance with a Stranger (1985), High Season (1987), Maleficent (2014), Maleficent: Mistress of Evil (2019), Mrs. Harris Goes to Paris (2022) and Queer (2024).

On television, she acted in Emmerdale Farm (1975–1976) and Cranford (2007). She garnered five British Academy Television Award nominations for her roles in River (2015), Mum (2016–19), Sherwood (2022–24) and The Crown (2022–23). She was nominated for the Primetime Emmy Award for Outstanding Supporting Actress in a Drama Series for her portrayal of Princess Margaret, Countess of Snowdon in the Netflix historical drama series The Crown. A prolific stage performer, she has won the Laurence Olivier Award for Best Actress twice for Ghosts (2014) and Oedipus (2025). Manville also won a Tony Award for Best Actress in a Play for the latter when she reprised her performance on Broadway (2026).

== Early life and education ==
Manville was born, on 12 March 1956, in Brighton, East Sussex, the daughter of Norma (known as Jean) Edwards, a former ballet dancer, and Ron Manville, a taxi driver. She was brought up in nearby Hove, the youngest of three daughters. Training as a soprano singer from age 8, she was twice under-18 champion of Sussex. She began acting as a teenager, appearing in television series such as King Cinder. At age 15, she gained a place at the Italia Conti Academy of Theatre Arts.

== Career ==
After turning down teacher Arlene Phillips's invitation to join her new dance troupe Hot Gossip, she was taught improvisation by Italia Conti teacher Julia Carey. She made her professional stage debut in the 1972 West End musical I and Albert directed by John Schlesinger. She paid for her first flat by landing a part in the ITV soap opera Emmerdale Farm (1975–76), in which she appeared in 80 episodes.

Manville built a career as a distinctive theatre actress; from 1978 she appeared in new plays at the Royal Shakespeare Company's Warehouse and Royal Court Theatre. She met Mike Leigh in 1979, when he was looking for RSC actors who could improvise.

In the 1980s, her work for the Royal Court included Andrea Dunbar's Rita, Sue and Bob Too (1981), Caryl Churchill's Top Girls (1982) and Serious Money (1987). She also starred in the Top Girls Off-Broadway production in the US in 1983. For the RSC, she starred in As You Like It (1985) and Les Liaisons Dangereuses (1985–86).

She made her film debut in 1985 with Dance with a Stranger, directed by Mike Newell, and telling the story of Ruth Ellis, the last woman to be hanged in Britain. She also appeared in Sammy and Rosie Get Laid (1987) directed by Stephen Frears, and High Season (1987). Back on the stage, she starred in The Cherry Orchard at the Aldwych Theatre in 1989, directed by Sam Mendes, and in Three Sisters at the Royal Court in 1990.

In 1994, Manville starred in the first series of the BBC sitcom Ain't Misbehavin'. For her work in the 2000 miniseries Other People's Children, and the 2002 TV film Bodily Harm, she received nominations for Best Female Actor at the Royal Television Society Awards.

Her extensive television credits include prominent roles in the dramas Holding On (1997), Real Women (1998–99), The Cazalets (2001), North & South (2004) and Cranford (2007). She also starred in Cards on the Table, a 2006 feature-length episode of Agatha Christie's Poirot.

Since 2005, Manville has starred in several National Theatre productions, including His Dark Materials (2005), The Alchemist (2006), and Her Naked Skin (2008). She also starred in The Old Vic productions of All About My Mother (2007) and Six Degrees of Separation (2010). In 2009, she played Margaret Thatcher in the Channel 4 drama The Queen.

Manville has appeared in eight Mike Leigh films throughout her career: Grown-Ups (1980), High Hopes (1988), Secrets & Lies (1996), Topsy-Turvy (1999), All or Nothing (2002), Vera Drake (2004), Another Year (2010), and Mr. Turner (2014). In 2002, she won the London Film Critics' Circle Award for British Actress of the Year.

For Another Year, she also won the National Board of Review Award for Best Actress, and was nominated for the British Independent Film Award for Best Supporting Actress and the European Film Award for Best Actress, as well as the Chicago Film Critics Award for Best Actress. She won Best Supporting Actress from the San Diego Film Critics Society. On 18 January 2011, she received a BAFTA nomination in the Best Supporting Actress category. On 7 February 2011, former Charlie's Angels stars Jaclyn Smith and Cheryl Ladd presented the Best Actress Award to her at the "Movies for Grownups Awards".

In 2011, Manville starred in Mike Leigh's play Grief at the Royal National Theatre, which earned her a Best Actress Olivier Award nomination. For her role as Helene Alving in the 2013 revival of the Ibsen play Ghosts, she won the 2014 Olivier Award for Best Actress and the Critics' Circle Theatre Award for Best Actress. She also appeared in the films Romeo and Juliet (2013) and Maleficent (2014).

In 2015, she starred opposite Stellan Skarsgård in the BBC drama River, which earned her a nomination for the 2016 BAFTA TV Award for Best Supporting Actress. She starred opposite Peter Mullan in the BBC sitcom Mum, for which she was nominated for the BAFTA TV Award for Best Female Comedy Performance in 2017 and 2019. In 2017, Manville played Lydia Quigley, the ruthless madam of a posh brothel with clients from the judiciary, nobility, and upper echelons of Georgian society, in the BBC series Harlots.

In Paul Thomas Anderson's 2017 period film Phantom Thread, Manville played Cyril Woodcock, the sister of the dressmaker Reynolds Woodcock, played by Daniel Day-Lewis. For her role, she was nominated for the Academy Award and BAFTA Award for Best Supporting Actress. In 2020, she played the villainous and intimidating matriarch of an 'off the grid' family in the neo-western thriller Let Him Go, opposite Diane Lane and Kevin Costner. During that year, she was cast as Princess Margaret, Countess of Snowdon for the final two seasons of The Crown.

Manville was appointed Commander of the Order of the British Empire (CBE) in the 2021 New Year Honours for services to drama and charity.

In 2022, Manville starred in the Anthony Horowitz murder mystery series, Magpie Murders, alongside Daniel Mays, Alexandros Logothetis, Jude Hill and Claire Rushbrook. Manville also played the role of the titular character in Mrs. Harris Goes to Paris. She received a nomination for the Golden Globe Award for Best Actress in a Motion Picture – Comedy or Musical for her performance in this film.

In January 2023, it was announced that Manville was added to the cast of the Amy Winehouse biopic Back to Black (2024) and would be playing Winehouse's grandmother Cynthia Winehouse.

In 2024, she played Jocasta in Oedipus at Wyndham's Theatre, directed by Robert Icke. For her performance, she won the Laurence Olivier Award for Best Actress. Manville made her Broadway theatre debut when the production transferred to Studio 54 in October 2025. She is described in this role as embodying contradiction, simultaneously feeling deeply and burying the feelings, while evoking a taut, dramatic silence in the audience. Manville won the Drama Desk Award for Outstanding Lead Performance in a Play and also received the Tony Award for Best Actress in a Play for her performance. Manville has been announced to star as Violet Weston in a West-End revival of August: Osage County, which is scheduled to play at the Noël Coward Theatre from January to April 2027.

== Personal life ==
Manville's first boyfriend was actor and former Blue Peter presenter Peter Duncan, whom she met at stage school while attending Italia Conti.

Her first husband was actor Gary Oldman. The pair split in 1989, three months after their son, Alfie (b. 1988), was born. Her second marriage was to actor Joe Dixon, whom she divorced in 2004. In 2007, Manville was living with her son in East Grinstead, West Sussex. Since 2019 Manville has lived on her own in west London.

Manville's sister Brenda, nine years her senior, died of a brain tumour. Her sister's husband and two daughters died of Huntington's disease.

In 2020, she delivered a monologue for the Equity Benevolent Fund to support fellow actors during the COVID-19 pandemic.

Manville was appointed Officer of the Order of the British Empire (OBE) in the 2015 Birthday Honours for services to drama, and promoted to Commander of the Order of the British Empire (CBE) in the 2021 New Year Honours for services to drama and charity.

In February 2024, she was the guest on BBC Radio 4's Desert Island Discs, selecting "Over the Rainbow" recorded by Eva Cassidy, a botanical encyclopaedia and a bed with linen, duvet and pillows as her chosen favourite record, book and luxury item respectively.

== Acting credits ==
Key
| † | Denotes works that have not yet been released |

=== Film ===
| Year | Title | Role | Notes |
|---|---|---|---|
| 1985 | Dance with a Stranger | Maryanne | |
| 1985 | Christmas Present | Judy Tall | |
| 1987 | Sammy and Rosie Get Laid | Margy | |
| 1987 | High Season | Carol | |
| 1988 | High Hopes | Lætitia Boothe-Braine | |
| 1996 | Secrets & Lies | Jenny Ford the Social Worker | |
| 1997 | Dual Balls | Joanna | Short film |
| 1999 | Milk | Fiona | |
| 1999 | Topsy-Turvy | Lucy Gilbert (Kitty) | |
| 1999 | Toy Boys | Mrs. Allen | Short film |
| 2002 | All or Nothing | Penny | |
| 2004 | Vera Drake | Mrs. Wells | |
| 2005 | The Great Ecstasy of Robert Carmichael | Sarah Carmichael | |
| 2007 | Richard Is My Boyfriend | Mother | |
| 2007 | Sparkle | Jill | |
| 2008 | The Escort | Lesley | Short film |
| 2009 | A Christmas Carol | Mrs. Cratchit (voice) | |
| 2009 | Suicide Man | Councillor Deakins | Short film |
| 2010 | Another Year | Mary | |
| 2010 | Womb | Judith | Retitled Clone for its UK DVD release |
| 2012 | Spike Island | Margaret Titchfield | |
| 2012 | Ashes | Cath | |
| 2013 | Romeo & Juliet | The Nurse | |
| 2013 | A Five Star Life | Kate Sherman | |
| 2013 | The Christmas Candle | Bea Haddington | |
| 2014 | Ghosts | Helene Alving | |
| 2014 | Maleficent | Flittle | |
| 2014 | Mr. Turner | Mary Somerville | |
| 2015 | Molly Moon and the Incredible Book of Hypnotism | Miss Adderstone | |
| 2016 | Domestic Policy | | Short film |
| 2016 | Rupture | Dr. Nyman | |
| 2017 | Hampstead | Fiona | |
| 2017 | The Agency | Anthea | Short film |
| 2017 | Phantom Thread | Cyril Woodcock | |
| 2019 | Ordinary Love | Joan | |
| 2019 | Maleficent: Mistress of Evil | Flittle | |
| 2020 | Misbehaviour | Dolores Hope | |
| 2020 | Let Him Go | Blanche Weboy | |
| 2021 | Everything I Ever Wanted to Tell My Daughter About Men | The Mother | |
| 2022 | Mrs. Harris Goes to Paris | Ada Harris | Also executive producer |
| 2023 | The Critic | Annabel Land | |
| 2024 | Back to Black | Cynthia Levy | |
| 2024 | Queer | Dr. Cotter | |
| 2025 | Mr Burton | Ma Smith | |
| 2025 | Winter of the Crow | Dr. Joan Andrews | |
| 2026 | Cold Storage | Trinny Romano | |
| 2026 | Midwinter Break | Stella | |
| 2027 | Jack of Spades † | TBA | Post-production |

=== Television ===
| Year | Title | Role | Notes |
|---|---|---|---|
| 1974 | Village Hall | Merle | Episode 6: "Dancing in the Dark" |
| 1974 | Softly, Softly: Task Force | Janet | Series 6; Episode 5: "Pop Goes the Weasel" |
| 1975 | Barlow | Christine West | Series 4; Episode 8: "Protection" |
| 1975–1976 | Emmerdale Farm | Rosemary Kendall | 79 episodes |
| 1976 | The Emigrants | Janice Parker | Episodes 1–3 |
| 1977 | Leap in the Dark | Julie | Series 3; Episode 2: "The Fetch" |
| 1977 | King Cinder | Nikki | Episodes 1–6 |
| 1977–1978 | A Bunch of Fives | Helen Wyatt | Series 1 & 2; 14 episodes |
| 1978 | Wings | Francoise | Series 2; Episode 6: "Dawn Attack" |
| 1978 | General Hospital | Tina Butler | Series 5; Episode 10: "Blood and Water" |
| 1980 | The Gentle Touch | Shirley Davis | Series 2; Episodes 5 & 7: "Hammer" and "Loyalties" |
| 1980 | BBC2 Playhouse | Mandy | Series 7; Episode 5: "Grown-Ups" |
| 1982 | Objects of Affection | Liz | Episode 1: "Our Winnie" |
| 1982 | Coronation Street | Jill Mason | 4 episodes |
| 1983 | Give Us a Break | Alma | Episode 5: "One Good Stroke Deserves Another" |
| 1984 | Sharing Time | June | Episode 4: "High Hopes" |
| 1984 | Play for Today | Vivienne | Series 14; Episode 10: "Dog Ends" |
| 1984 | Angels in the Annexe | Jenny Bailey | Television film |
| 1985 | Doctors' Dilemmas | Jessica Schofield | Series 2; Episode 4: "You Want Me to Be Dirty and Fat" |
| 1985 | Bulman | Karen Tait | Series 1; Episode 5: "The Name of the Game" |
| 1985 | The Moon Over Soho | Sally Spencer | Television film |
| 1989 | Screen Two | Sue Bissel | Series 5; Episode 8: "The Firm" |
| 1991 | Performance | Marlene | Series 1; Episode 5: "Top Girls" |
| 1992 | ScreenPlay | Penny Armitage | Series 7; Episode 3: "Bad Girl" |
| 1992 | Soldier Soldier | Rachel Elliot (later Fortune) | Series 2; 5 episodes |
| 1993 | The Mushroom Picker | Margot | Mini-series; Episodes 1–3 |
| 1993 | A Statement of Affairs | Carol | Mini-series; Episode 1 |
| 1993 | Goggle-Eyes | Rosalind Killin | Mini-series; Episodes 1–4 |
| 1993 | Crime Story | Gail | Series 2; Episode 2: "When the Lies Run Out: The Ian Spiro Story" |
| 1994 | Screen Two | Sophie | Series 10; Episode 5: "O Mary This London" |
| 1994 | Ain't Misbehavin' | Melissa Quigley | Series 1; Episodes 1–6 |
| 1994 | Little Napoleons | Judith Silver | Mini-series; Episodes 1–4 |
| 1994 | A Skirt Through History | Bessie Parkes | Episode 2: "A Lady's Portion" |
| 1995 | Tears Before Bedtime | Beattie Freeman | Episodes 1–4 |
| 1996 | The Bite | Ellie Shannon | Mini-series; Episodes 1 & 2 |
| 1996 | Kavanagh QC | Lucy Cartwright | Series 2; Episode 1: "The Commitment" |
| 1997 | Holding On | Hilary | Mini-series; Episodes 2–8 |
| 1997 | Painted Lady | Susie Peel | Television film |
| 1998 | Silent Witness | Suzy Franklin | Series 3; Episodes 3 & 4: "Fallen Idol: Parts 1 & 2" |
| 1998–1999 | Real Women | Karen Turner | Series 1 & 2; 7 episodes |
| 2000 | Other People's Children | Nadine | Episodes 2 & 3 |
| 2000 | Black Cab | Yvonne | Episode 2: "Lost & Found" |
| 2000 | David Copperfield | Mrs. Micawber | Television film |
| 2001 | The Cazalets | Villy Cazalet | Episodes 1–6 |
| 2002 | Bodily Harm | Mandy Greenfield | Mini-series; Episodes 1 & 2 |
| 2002 | Plain Jane | Dora Bruce | Television film |
| 2003 | Promoted to Glory | Capt. Annie Sullivan | Television film |
| 2004 | Rose and Maloney | Professor Diane Marquis | Series 2; Episodes 3 & 4: "Katie Phelan: Parts 1 & 2" |
| 2004 | North & South | Maria Hale | Mini-series; Episodes 1–3 |
| 2005 | Agatha Christie's Poirot | Mrs. Lorrimer | Series 10; Episode 2: "Cards on the Table" |
| 2006 | Perfect Parents | Sister Antonia | Television film |
| 2007 | Richard Is My Boyfriend | Michelle | Television film |
| 2007 | Cranford | Mrs. Rose | Series 1; Episodes 1–5 |
| 2009 | The Queen | Margaret Thatcher | Episode 3: "The Rivals" |
| 2009, 2011 | Law & Order: UK | Phyllis Gladstone | Series 1; Episodes 3 & 7, and Series 5; Episode 4 |
| 2010 | Playhouse: Live | Meryl | Episode 2: "Ghost Story" |
| 2011 | Midsomer Murders | Phoebe Archbold | Series 13; Episode 8: "Fit for Murder" |
| 2013 | An Adventure in Space and Time | Heather Hartnell | Television film |
| 2013 | Mayday | Gail Spicer | Mini-series; Episodes 1–5 |
| 2013 | My Hero | Herself - Narrator | Episodes 1–3 |
| 2014 | Fleming | Evelyn St. Croix Fleming | Mini-series; Episodes 1–4 |
| 2015 | Timeshift | Herself - Narrator | Series 15; Episode 2: "A Very British Map: The Ordnance Survey Story" |
| 2015 | The Go-Between | Mrs. Maudsley | Television film |
| 2015 | River | DCI Chrissie Read | Mini-series; Episodes 1–6 |
| 2015 | A Very British Brothel | Herself - Narrator | Television documentary film |
| 2015–2016 | CBeebies Bedtime Stories | Herself - Storyteller | 5 episodes |
| 2016–2019 | Mum | Cathy | Main role. Series 1–3; 18 episodes |
| 2017–2019 | Harlots | Lydia Quigley | Series 1–3; 24 episodes |
| 2018 | To Provide All People | Consultant Psychiatrist | Television film |
| 2019–2023 | World on Fire | Robina Chase | Series 1 & 2; 13 episodes |
| 2020 | Save Me Too | Jennifer Charles | Series 2; Episodes 1–4 |
| 2020 | Love Life | Herself / Narrator | Main role |
| 2020 | Talking Heads 3 | Susan | Episode 8: "Bed Among the Lentils" |
| 2021 | I Am... | Maria | Series 2; Episode 3: "I Am Maria" |
| 2022 | Magpie Murders | Susan Ryeland | Lead role (also executive producer) |
| 2022 | Life After Life | Herself - Narrator | Episodes 1–4 |
| 2022 | Dangerous Liaisons | Genevieve de Merteuil | Episodes 1 & 2: "Love or War" and "Conquer of Die" |
| 2022–23 | The Crown | Princess Margaret, Countess of Snowdon | Series 5–6 |
| 2022– | Sherwood | Julie Jackson | Series 1-3 |
| 2023– | Citadel | Dahlia Archer | Main role |
| 2023 | Who Do You Think You Are? | Herself | Series 20; Episode 9: "Lesley Manville" |
| 2024 | Disclaimer | Nancy Brigstocke | Miniseries |
| 2024 | Moonflower Murders | Susan Ryeland | Lead role |
| 2024 | Grotesquerie | Nurse Redd | Main role |
| 2025 | Monster: The Ed Gein Story | Bernice Worden | 2 episodes |
| 2026 | Marble Hall Murders | Susan Ryeland | Lead role |

=== Theatre ===
| Year | Title | Role | Director | Venue |
|---|---|---|---|---|
| 1978 | Savage Amusement | Ali | John Caird | RSC – Warehouse |
| 1978 | The Sons of Light | Sister Croy | Ron Daniels | RSC – Warehouse |
| 1980 | Fear of the Dark | Jen | Walter Donohue | Royal Shakespeare Company |
| 1981 | Chorus Girls | Performer | Adrian Shergold | Theatre Royal, Stratford East |
| 1978 | Who Needs Enemies? | Second Student | Walter Donohue | RSC – Warehouse |
| 1981 | Borderline | Susan, Valerie | Max Stafford-Clark | Royal Court |
| 1981 | Rita, Sue and Bob Too | Sue | Andrea Dunbar | Royal Court Theatre, London |
| 1982 | Top Girls | Patient Griselda | Caryl Churchill | The Public Theater, Off-Broadway |
| 1983 | Falkland Sound | Performer | Max Stafford-Clark | Royal Court Theatre, London |
| 1984 | The Pope's Wedding | Pat | Max Stafford-Clark | Royal Court Theatre, London |
| 1984 | Saved | Liz | Danny Boyle | Royal Court Theatre, London |
| 1985 | Philistines | Polya | —N/a | Royal Shakespeare Company, London |
| 1985 | The Dead Monkey | Dolores | Roger Michell | Royal Shakespeare Company, London |
| 1985–1986 | As You Like It | Phebe | Adrian Noble | Royal Shakespeare Theatre, London |
| 1986 | Les Liaisons Dangereuses | Cécile | Howard Davies | Barbican Centre, London |
| 1989 | Serious Money | Scilla | Max Stafford-Clark | Royal Court Theatre, London |
| 1989 | American Bagpipes | Sandra | Lindsay Posner | Royal Court Theatre, London |
| 1989 | The Cherry Orchard | Varya | Sam Mendes | Aldwych Theatre, London |
| 1990 | Three Sisters | Natasha | Adrian Noble | Royal Court Theatre, London |
| 1990 | Miss Julie | Miss Julie | —N/a | Greenwich Theatre |
| 2005 | Some Girl(s) | Lindsay | David Grindley | Gielgud Theatre |
| 2005 | His Dark Materials | Mrs. Coulter | Nicholas Hytner | Royal National Theatre, London |
| 2006 | Pillars of the Community | Lona | Marianne Elliott | Lyttelton, NT, London |
| 2006 | The Alchemist | Dol Common | Nicholas Hytner | Royal National Theatre, London |
| 2007 | All About My Mother | Manuela | Tom Cairns | The Old Vic, London |
| 2008 | Her Naked Skin | Celia Cain | Nicholas Hytner | Royal National Theatre, London |
| 2010 | Six Degrees of Separation | Ouisa Kittredge | David Grindley | The Old Vic, London |
| 2011 | Grief | Dorothy | Mike Leigh | Royal National Theatre, London |
| 2013 | Ghosts | Helene Alving | Richard Eyre | Almeida Theatre, London |
| 2015 | The Iliad | Performer | Rupert Goold | Almeida Theatre, London |
| 2015 | Ghosts | Helene Alving | Richard Eyre | Brooklyn Academy of Music |
| 2016 | Long Day's Journey into Night | Mary Tyrone | Richard Eyre | Bristol Old Vic |
| 2018 | Long Day's Journey into Night | Mary Tyrone | Richard Eyre | Wyndham's Theatre; Brooklyn Academy of Music; Wallis Annenberg Center for the Performing Arts |
| 2020 | The Visit | Claire Zachanassian | Jeremy Herrin | Royal National Theatre, London |
| 2024 | Oedipus | Jocasta | Robert Icke | Wyndham's Theatre, London |
| 2025 | Oedipus | Jocasta | Robert Icke | Studio 54, Broadway |
| 2026 | Les Liaisons Dangereuses | Marquise de Merteuil | Marianne Elliott | Royal National Theatre, London |
| 2026-2027 | August: Osage County | Violet | Jeremy Herrin | Noël Coward Theatre |

== Awards and nominations ==
| Year | Association | Category | Project | Result | Ref. |
|---|---|---|---|---|---|
| 2001 | London Film Critics Circle | Best British Supporting Actress | Topsy-Turvy | Nominated | |
| 2003 | Evening Standard British Film Award | Best Actress | All or Nothing | Won | |
| 2003 | London Film Critics Circle | Best British Actress of the Year | All or Nothing | Won | |
| 2011 | BAFTA Film Award | Best Actress in a Supporting Role | Another Year | Nominated | |
| 2011 | British Independent Film Award | Best Supporting Actress | Another Year | Nominated | |
| 2011 | Chicago Film Critics Association | Best Actress | Another Year | Nominated | |
| 2011 | European Film Award | Best Actress | Another Year | Nominated | |
| 2011 | London Film Critics Circle | Best British Actress of the Year | Another Year | Won | |
| 2011 | National Board of Review | Best Actress | Another Year | Won | |
| 2011 | National Society of Film Critics | Best Actress | Another Year | 3rd Place | |
| 2011 | San Diego Film Critics Society | Best Ensemble Performance | Another Year | Nominated | |
| 2011 | San Diego Film Critics Society | Best Supporting Actress | Another Year | Won | |
| 2011 | Santa Barbara International Film Festival | Virtuoso Award | Another Year | Won | |
| 2012 | Laurence Olivier Award | Best Actress | Grief | Nominated | |
| 2014 | Critics' Circle Theatre Award | Best Actress | Ghosts | Won | |
| 2014 | Laurence Olivier Award | Best Actress | Ghosts | Won | |
| 2015 | Drama League Awards | Distinguished Performance | Ghosts | Nominated | |
| 2016 | BAFTA TV Award | Best Supporting Actress | River | Nominated | |
| 2017 | BAFTA TV Award | Best Female Comedy Performance | Mum | Nominated | |
| 2018 | Academy Award | Best Supporting Actress | Phantom Thread | Nominated | |
| 2018 | BAFTA Film Award | Best Actress in a Supporting Role | Phantom Thread | Nominated | |
| 2018 | Chicago Film Critics Association | Best Supporting Actress | Phantom Thread | Nominated | |
| 2018 | London Film Critics' Circle | Supporting Actress of the Year | Phantom Thread | Won | |
| 2018 | National Society of Film Critics | Best Supporting Actress | Phantom Thread | Nominated | |
| 2018 | Toronto Film Critics Association | Best Supporting Actress | Phantom Thread | Nominated | |
| 2018 | San Francisco Film Critics Circle | Best Supporting Actress | Phantom Thread | Nominated | |
| 2018 | Vancouver Film Critics Circle | Best Supporting Actress | Phantom Thread | Nominated | |
| 2018 | Laurence Olivier Award | Best Actress | Long Day's Journey into Night | Nominated | |
| 2019 | BAFTA TV Award | Best Female Comedy Performance | Mum | Nominated | |
| 2019 | Royal Television Society | Comedy Performance (Female) | Mum | Won | |
| 2023 | Golden Globe Award | Best Actress in a Motion Picture – Musical or Comedy | Mrs. Harris Goes to Paris | Nominated | |
| 2023 | Actor Awards | Outstanding Ensemble in a Drama Series | The Crown (season 5) | Nominated | |
| 2023 | BAFTA TV Award | Best Supporting Actress | Sherwood | Nominated | |
| 2024 | BAFTA TV Award | Best Supporting Actress | The Crown (season 6) | Nominated | |
| 2024 | Primetime Emmy Award | Outstanding Supporting Actress in a Drama Series | The Crown (season 6) | Nominated | |
| 2024 | Actor Awards | Outstanding Ensemble in a Drama Series | The Crown (season 6) | Nominated | |
| 2025 | Critic's Circle Theatre Award | Best Actress | Oedipus | Won | |
| 2025 | Laurence Olivier Award | Best Actress | Oedipus | Won | |
| 2026 | Drama League Award | Distinguished Performance | Oedipus | Nominated | |
| 2026 | Drama Desk Awards | Outstanding Lead Performance in a Play | Oedipus | Won | |
| 2026 | Tony Awards | Best Actress in a Play | Oedipus | Won | |
| 2026 | Dorian Award | Outstanding Lead Performance in a Broadway Play | Oedipus | Nominated | |

== See also ==
- List of Academy Award winners and nominees from Great Britain
- List of actors in Royal Shakespeare Company productions
- List of actors with Academy Award nominations
- List of British actors
- List of Royal National Theatre Company actors
