= Michael Rolfe =

Australian rules footballer

Personal information
- Full name: Michael Rolfe
- Born: 14 September 1962 (age 64); Echuca
- Original team: Echuca
- Height: 180 cm (5 ft 11 in)
- Weight: 76 kg (168 lb)

Playing career
Years	Club	Games (Goals)
1983	Richmond	10 (4)
1986	Footscray	2 (1)
Total		12 (5)

Michael Rolfe (born 14 September 1962) is a former Australian rules footballer who played with Richmond and Footscray in the Victorian Football League (VFL).
