= The Kiss of Death (Play for Today) =

- Play for Today episode
- Episode no.: Series 7 Episode 9
- Directed by: Mike Leigh
- Written by: Mike Leigh
- Editing by: Oliver White
- Original air date: 11 January 1977

Episode chronology
| ← Previous "Love on a Gunboat" | Next → "Our Flesh And Blood" |

"The Kiss of Death" is the ninth episode of seventh season of the British BBC anthology TV series Play for Today. The episode was a television play that was originally broadcast on 11 January 1977. The Kiss of Death was written and directed by Mike Leigh, produced by David Rose, and starred David Threlfall.

Mike Leigh directed "this whimsical tale about Trevor, (David Threlfall), an unusually bashful mortician's assistant", whose moods and personality make the subject of the film. A natural landscape for Leigh's offbeat and bleakly humorous worldview with certain autobiographical elements, Leigh has often said the film is one of his favourites.

Trevor and his friend Ronnie form a foursome with Linda and Sandra. A brake on Trevor's joy in life "is the factual premonition of everyday death", and the central incident of a cot death affects him profoundly.

== Plot summary ==
Trevor is an extremely shy undertaker's assistant. He always tags along with his good friend Ronnie, when he goes to the pub with his girlfriend Sandra. Sandra introduces Trevor to her more forward friend Linda. Linda has a difficult time getting Trevor to go out with her, but she finally gets him to go to a disco; he won't dance, so Linda dances with Ronnie.

Trevor's shyness and inability to engage with Linda, despite her persistent attempts to get him to ask her on a date and even take her dancing. The play ends with Trevor still too shy to dance at the disco, leaving the audience with the feeling of awkwardness and unrealized potential, highlighting the absurdity of the situation.

== Cast ==
- David Threlfall as Trevor
- Clifford Kershaw as Mr Garside
- John Wheatley as Ronnie
- Angela Curran as Sandra
- Kay Adshead as Linda

== Critical responses ==
The play is highly regarded by the critic Michael Coveney, who wrote in a 1996 study of Leigh's work : "The kissing part of The Kiss of Death is an extraordinary scene. Linda and Trevor are on a sofa, she chewing away, he nervously amused but not exactly apprehensive...The playing of Kay Adshead and David Threlfall indicates every stage of this sexual jousting match with faultless accuracy and perception. We glimpse ... an entire catalogue of human emotions in the mating game: anxiety, cruelty, affection, wonder, contempt and playfulness. This is how love scenes are endured in life, not in the movies, but distilled and refined for this movie."
