= Louis Marks =

English screenwriter and producer (1928–2010)

- Born: Louis Frank Marks; 23 March 1928; London, England
- Died: 17 September 2010 (aged 82)
- Education: Balliol College, Oxford
- Occupations: Writer; Producer

Louis Frank Marks (23 March 1928 – 17 September 2010) was an English screenwriter and producer, mainly for BBC Television. His career began in the late 1950s and continued into the next century.

== Early life ==
Marks was born on 23 March 1928 in Golders Green in London as the son of a Jewish jeweller. He was educated at Christ's College, Finchley, studied history at Balliol College, Oxford and ultimately gained a DPhil. His tutor was Marxist historian Christopher Hill.

A member of the Communist Party of Great Britain while at Oxford, Marks was an early translator of the work of Antonio Gramsci into English. His translation of sections of the Prison Notebooks was published as The Modern Prince and Other Writings (1957).

== Television ==
Marks' early work was as a writer for television. He began by contributing to The Adventures of Robin Hood beginning with an episode screened in 1958 and The Four Just Men (1960), both for Sapphire Films/ITC. He wrote the screenplay for the feature film The Man Who Finally Died (1963), adapted from a television serial by Lewis Greifer, and Special Branch for Thames Television (1970).

Marks wrote for Danger Man (US: Secret Agent, 1964), for the Doomwatch science fiction series, and for Doctor Who on four occasions. The first of these, Planet of Giants (1964), opened the second season of the programme tackling environmentalism. His second script was Day of the Daleks (1972), which was the first Dalek story in the colour era. During the Tom Baker years, he wrote the Jekyll and Hyde script for Planet of Evil (1975); and finally The Masque of Mandragora (1976), which drew on his academic background and studies of Renaissance Italy.

He also served as a script editor on programmes such as Bedtime Stories (1974); The Stone Tape (1972); and No Exit (1972).

Marks' producer credits include The Lost Boys (1978), Fearless Frank (1979), the BBC's adaptation of the Three Theban plays (between 1984 and 1986), and the BBC's adaptation of George Eliot's Middlemarch (1994). He worked with Jack Clayton on an adaption of Muriel Spark's Memento Mori (1991), Harold Pinter on The Hothouse (1987) and with Mike Leigh on Grown-Ups (1982). His production of Daniel Deronda by George Eliot was screened by the BBC in 2002.

Marks worked with distinguished actors including Anthony Hopkins, Claire Bloom, John Gielgud, Nigel Hawthorne, Michael Gambon, Judi Dench, and Ben Kingsley on the adaptation of another George Eliot work Silas Marner (1985).

== Death ==
Marks died on 17 September 2010.
