= Mike Packer =

English dramatist

Mike Packer (born Lusaka, Zambia) is an English dramatist, actor and poet. He has written several plays, among them Cardboys, A Carpet, a Pony and a Monkey, tHe dYsFUnCKshOnalZ! and Inheritance. His plays have been performed at London's Bush Theatre, Newcastle Live, and Soho. Internationally, his work has been performed in Russia, Australia, Hungary, and Germany. His debut play To Live Like a King was a runner-up for the Allied Domecq New Playwrights Award.

tHe dYsFUnCKshOnalZ! opened at London's Bush Theatre in 2007.

As an actor, Packer appeared in several TV series and dramas. In theatre he had appeared at The Royal Court, The Riverside Studios, and The Old Half Moon.

For a short period in the early 1990s, he was a performance poet under the name of Packman. Winning the London Poetry slam, being a runner up in the inaugural UK all comers slam, and performing at the Glastonbury Festival.

Packer is married to the actress and director Julia Ford. They reside in Brighton. The couple have two sons, Frank and Jake.
