= Judith Scott (British actress) =

British actress (1957–2018)

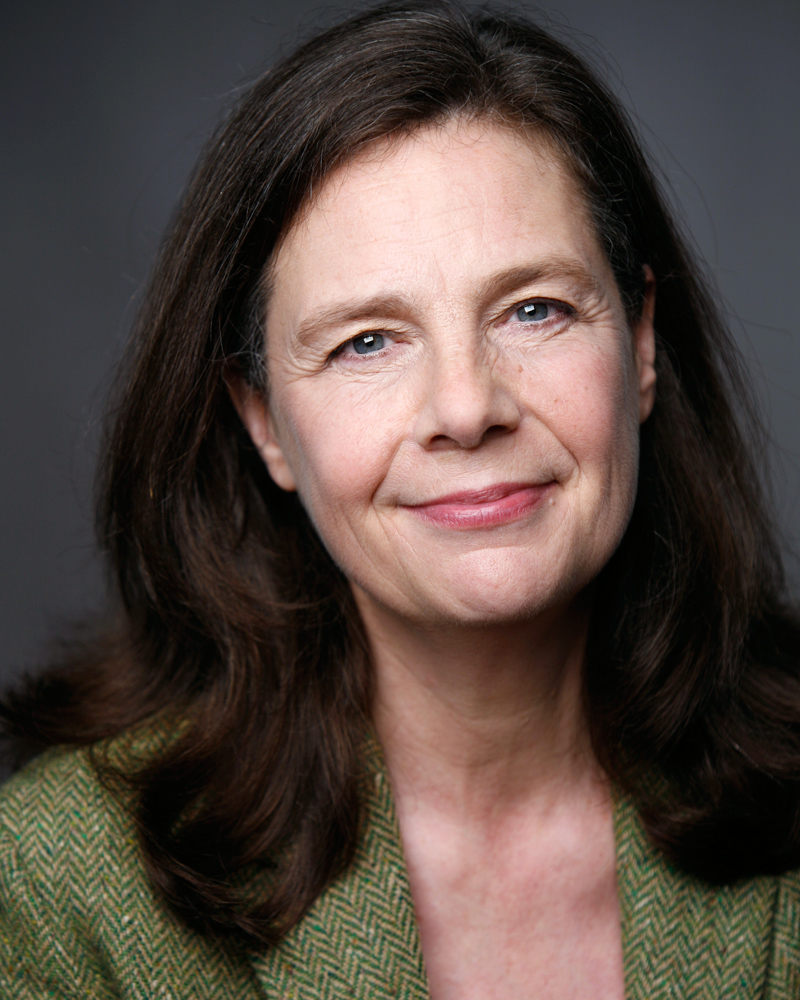
Judith Scott

Judi Scott (1957–2018) was a British theatrical, film and television actress.

== Credits ==
=== Theatre ===
- Absurdia at the Donmar Warehouse
- The Romans In Britain at the Sheffield Crucible

=== Film and TV ===
- "Mr. Turner" (directed by Mike Leigh)
- High Hopes (directed by Mike Leigh)
- Vera Drake (directed by Mike Leigh)
- News Hounds (directed by Les Blair)
- Between The Lines (TV series), Series 1, Episode 8, as Inspector Jane Toynton (directed by Tom Clegg)
- Bliss (directed by Les Blair)
- Milk (directed by William Brookfield)
- My Brother Tom (directed by Dom Rotheroe)
- Midsomer Murders (directed by Jeremy Silberston)

== Awards ==
Cannes Television Film Awards 1992: Best Actress for BBC Screen One Tell Me That You Love Me.
