= Grown-Ups =

- Written by: Mike Leigh
- Directed by: Mike Leigh
- Starring: Lesley Manville; Philip Davis; Brenda Blethyn; Janine Duvitski; Lindsay Duncan; Sam Kelly
- Country of origin: United Kingdom
- Original language: English

Production
- Producer: Louis Marks
- Cinematography: Remi Adefarasin
- Editor: Robin Sales
- Running time: 95 minutes

Original release
- Network: BBC 2
- Release: 28 November 1980

Grown-Ups was a 1980 British BBC television film devised and directed by Mike Leigh. It stars Lesley Manville, Philip Davis, Brenda Blethyn, Janine Duvitski, Lindsay Duncan and Sam Kelly. It was edited by Robin Sales and produced by Louis Marks for the BBC, and originally shown on BBC 2 on 28 November 1980.

== Plot ==
Dick and Mandy (Philip Davis and Lesley Manville), friends at school, sweethearts, and now newlyweds, are moving into their first home. Their new council-owned house turns out to be next door to their Religious Knowledge teacher at school, Ralph Butcher (Sam Kelly). He is married to fellow teacher Christine (Lindsay Duncan), 'earnest, in specs and angora cardigans.' They have a somewhat joyless marriage. Dick and Mandy are locked in disagreement over whether to have children. They are visited by another friend from school, Sharon (Janine Duvitski), and also, consistently throughout their settling-in period, by Mandy's older sister, the fussing Gloria (Brenda Blethyn), who seeks escape from being stuck at home with her tyrannical mother.

Dick becomes frustrated with Gloria's frequent visits, and things come to a head when Gloria comes round whilst Sharon and Mandy are out shopping. Dick is trying to watch Grandstand and when Mandy returns he loses his temper. He throws Gloria out and she seeks refuge next door at the Butchers' house. She locks herself in the toilet. Dick and Mandy come round to the house, and Dick threatens Gloria with violence unless she unlocks the door and leaves the Butchers' house.

Eventually Christine talks her out of the toilet, assuring Gloria that Dick has gone. She is helped down the stairs, and Dick is waiting for her. He grabs her and tries to get her out of the house but is stopped by Ralph. Eventually a furious Dick leaves the house, followed by a hysterical Mandy after getting a slap across the face from Christine.

Ralph and Christine calm Gloria down with a cup of tea and also let her have a nap on their sofa. Christine goes next door to speak to Mandy and Dick to calm things down and arrange for them to take Gloria back to her Mum's. Mandy and Sharon go back to the Butchers' to take her home. They get a taxi and argue on the way.

That evening, Dick and Mandy decide to try for a baby after all, whilst at the Butchers' house, Christine angrily tells Ralph she also wants to have a sex life and a family. Her pleas seemingly fall on deaf ears with Ralph, who carries on reading.

Some months later (around Christmas) Dick, Mandy and Gloria have reconciled. Mandy is heavily pregnant and Gloria comes round to listen to the baby, who is kicking frequently. Gloria now has a boyfriend, it seems. Gloria leaves to go to a party, and Dick jokes that he doubts whether the boyfriend will turn up to it.

== Production ==
Janine Duvitski as Sharon

Leigh was determined, following the erratic uncontrolled elements he felt had marred his previous television film, Who's Who, to make a precise and utterly controlled film. Quoted in Michael Coveney's 1996 biography he said; "And that's what we got I think. It was also the first time I worked with far and away the best lighting cameraman I'd had up to that time, Remi Adefarasin." Another key friendship was forged with Simon Channing-Williams who worked as first assistant director on the film.

Having considered Harlow for the film's location, he decided finally to shoot in Canterbury, a choice strengthened when he discovered that Brenda Blethyn, whom he had cast in a role 'that was to be one of his most inspired creations', came from nearby Ramsgate. He also needed two adjacent houses, one semi-detached and privately owned, one a council house. Two such houses were found (at Nunnery Road/Oxford Road, just to the south the city centre) and most of the film - (though the opening sequence follows a removal van around Canterbury in the shadow of Canterbury Cathedral) - stays in and around that location.

== Screening ==
The London Film Festival had recently changed its rule about not admitting television films to the annual showcase, and Grown-Ups was the first television film to be included. After the screening, Maurice Hatton, a fellow film-maker, and one with a lower-middle-class Jewish background in Manchester, asked Leigh if the film was autobiographical. Leigh had said no. In Michael Coveney's biography however, Leigh admitted that Hatton was right. Gloria was incorporating memories of Leigh's Auntie Janey, widowed by the First World War, who used to pop round to visit the Leigh family in Cavendish Road (in Broughton) at unexpected moments, peering through the window in her thick spectacles. And the shouting and the commotion was the sort of domestic babble he had grown up with. Leigh: "So yes, there is something autobiographical about Grown-Ups, and not just the screaming on the stairs. The whole atmosphere of people coming round, coming into a house. I now see that, after the RSC abortion, [Leigh had cancelled his 1978 piece for the company after ten weeks of rehearsal], I was plugging back into a world I knew about, things that directly concerned me: hell in the suburbs."
