= Textile arts =

Form of arts and crafts using fibers

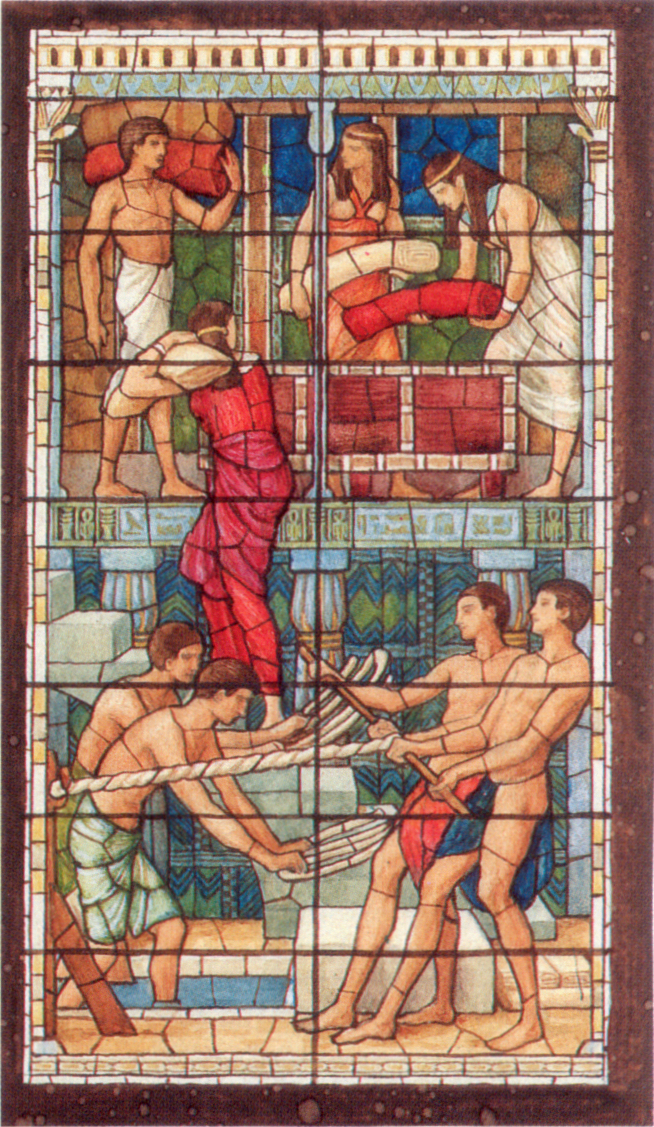
Textile arts in ancient Egypt

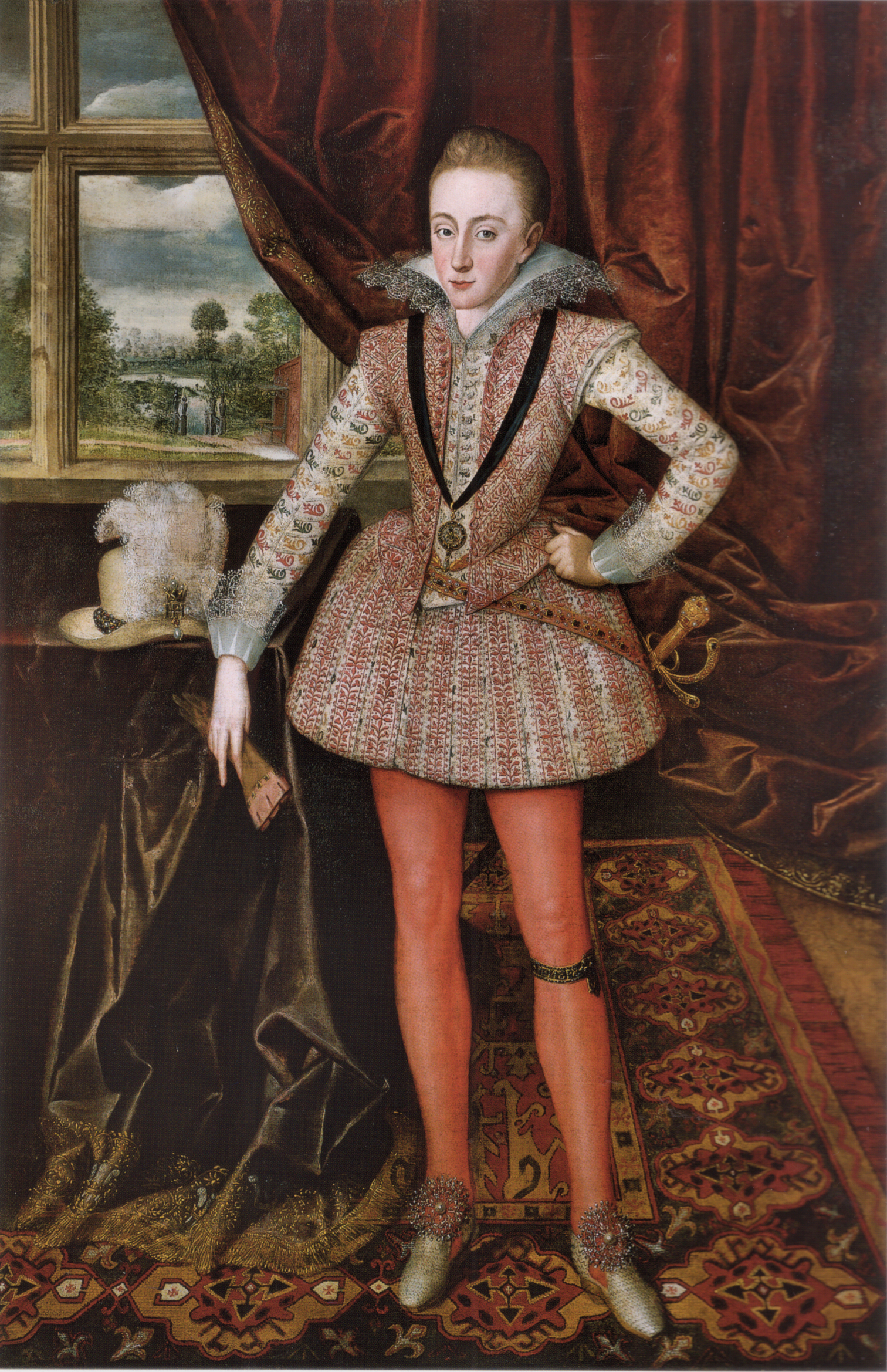
This portrait illustrates the practical, decorative, and social aspects of the textile arts. Henry Frederick, Prince of Wales by Robert Peake the Elder, 1610.

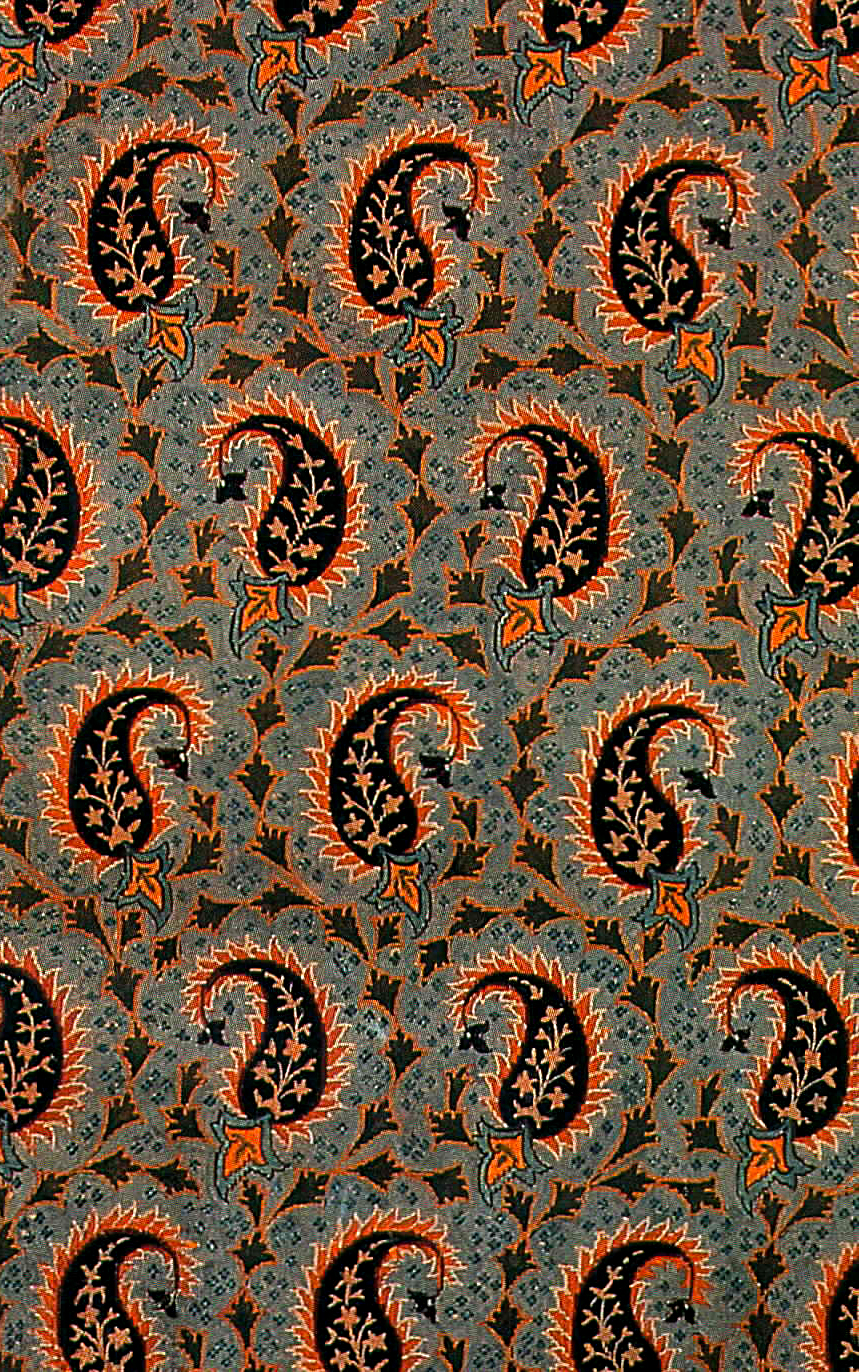
Persian Silk Brocade. Persian Textile (The Golden Yarns of Zari - Brocade). Silk Brocade with Golden Thread (Golabetoon). Pattern and Design: Paisley Left and Right (Bote Jeghe), With Main Repeating Motif (Persian Paisley).

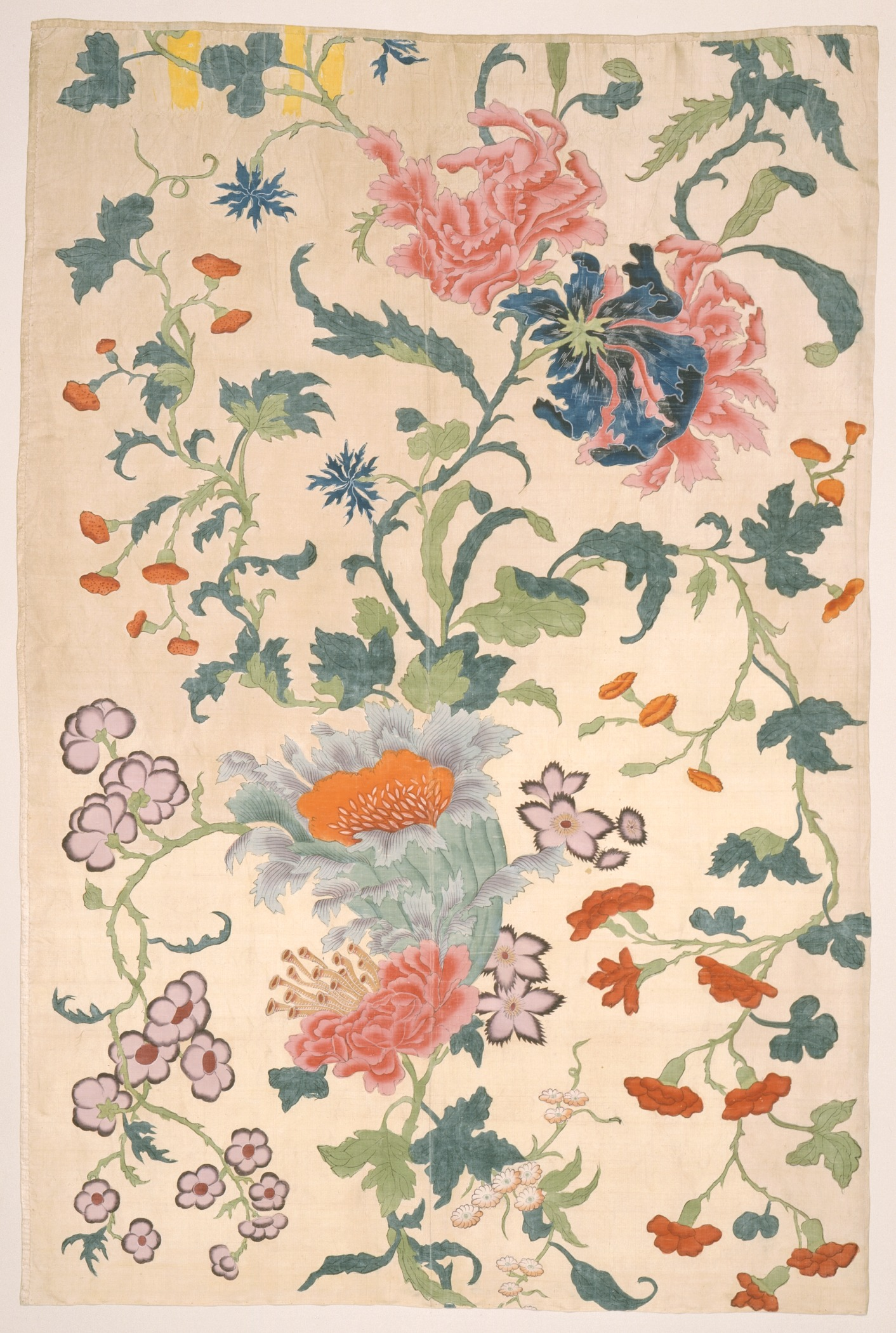
Textile, painted silk, 45 × 29 1/2 in. (114.3 × 74.93 cm), Qing Dynasty, China, mid-18th century, LACMA textile collection

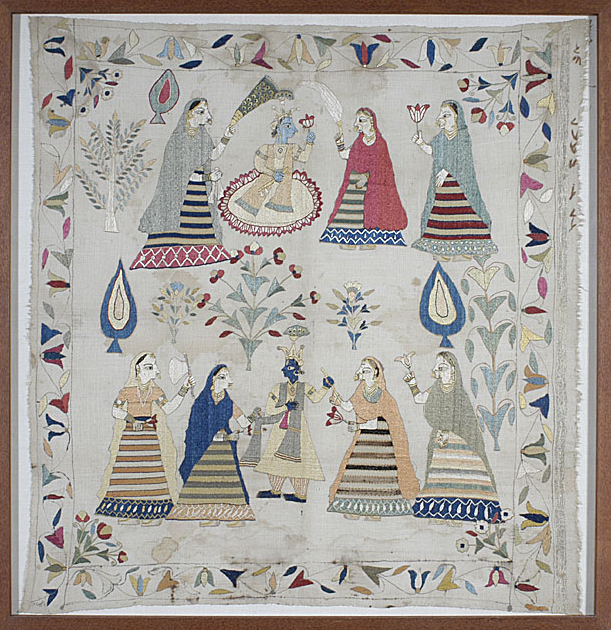
Chamba Rumāl with scenes of gopis worshiping Krishna. Late 18th to early 19th century, Himachal Pradesh, India. Ceremonial/ritual furnishing, silk embroidery on cotton. LACMA textile collection

Textile art is art created from natural or synthetic fibers or from fabric or textile. Textile art is synonymous with fiber art. The art could be wall-hung, sculptural, installation, or have a functional decorative arts purpose.

Techniques used in creating textile art can include:

- Appliqué
- Basket weaving
- Beadwork
- Crochet
- Dyeing
- Embroidery
- Felt
- Knitting
- Knotting or macramé
- Needlework
- Quilting
- Sewing
- Surface design such as mark making or printing
- Twining
- Weaving

or many other techniques

== Historical Context of Textiles ==
Textiles have been a fundamental part of human life since the beginning of civilization. The methods and materials used to make them have expanded enormously, while the functions of textiles have remained the same, there are many functions for textiles. Whether it be clothing or something decorative for the house/shelter. The history of textile arts is also the history of international trade. Tyrian purple dye was an important trade good in the ancient Mediterranean. The Silk Road brought Chinese silk to India, Africa, and Europe, and, conversely, Sogdian silk to China. Tastes for imported luxury fabrics led to sumptuary laws during the Middle Ages and Renaissance. The Industrial Revolution was shaped largely by innovation in textiles technology: the cotton gin, the spinning jenny, and the power loom mechanized production and led to the Luddite rebellion.

== Concepts ==
The word textile is from Latin texere which means "to weave", "to braid" or "to construct". The simplest textile art is felting, in which animal fibers are matted together using heat and moisture. Most textile arts begin with twisting or spinning and plying fibers to make yarn (called thread when it is very fine and rope when it is very heavy). The yarn is then knotted, looped, braided, or woven to make flexible fabric or cloth, and cloth can be used to make clothing and soft furnishings. All of these items – felt, yarn, fabric, and finished objects – are collectively referred to as textiles.

The textile arts also include those techniques which are used to embellish or decorate textiles – dyeing and printing to add color and pattern; embroidery and other types of needlework; tablet weaving; and lace-making. Construction methods such as sewing, knitting, crochet, and tailoring, as well as the tools employed (looms and sewing needles), techniques employed (quilting and pleating) and the objects made (carpets, kilims, hooked rugs, and coverlets) all fall under the category of textile arts.

== Functions ==
From early times, textiles have been used to cover the human body and protect it from the elements; to send social cues to other people; to store, secure, and protect possessions; and to soften, insulate, and decorate living spaces and surfaces.

The persistence of ancient textile arts and functions, and their elaboration for decorative effect, can be seen in a Jacobean era portrait of Henry Frederick, Prince of Wales by Robert Peake the Elder (above). The prince's capotain hat is made of felt using the most basic of textile techniques. His clothing is made of woven cloth, richly embroidered in silk, and his stockings are knitted. He stands on an oriental rug of wool which softens and warms the floor, and heavy curtains both decorate the room and block cold drafts from the window. Goldwork embroidery on the tablecloth and curtains proclaim the status of the home's owner, in the same way that the felted fur hat, sheer linen shirt trimmed with reticella lace, and opulent embroidery on the prince's clothes proclaim his social position.

== Textiles as art ==
Traditionally the term art was used to refer to any skill or mastery, a concept which altered during the Romantic period of the nineteenth century, when art came to be seen as "a special faculty of the human mind to be classified with religion and science". This distinction between craft and fine art is applied to the textile arts as well, where the term fiber art or textile art is now used to describe textile-based decorative objects which are not intended for practical use.

== History of plant use in textile arts ==
Natural fibers have been an important aspect of human society since 7000 B.C., and it is suspected that they were first used in ornamental cloths since 400 B.C. in India where cotton was first grown. Natural fibers have been used for the past 4000 to 5000 years to make cloth, and plant and animal fibers were the only way that clothing and fabrics could be created up until 1885 when the first synthetic fiber was made. Cotton and flax are two of the most common natural fibers that are used today, but historically natural fibers were made of most parts of the plant, including bark, stem, leaf, fruit, seed hairs, and sap.

=== Flax ===
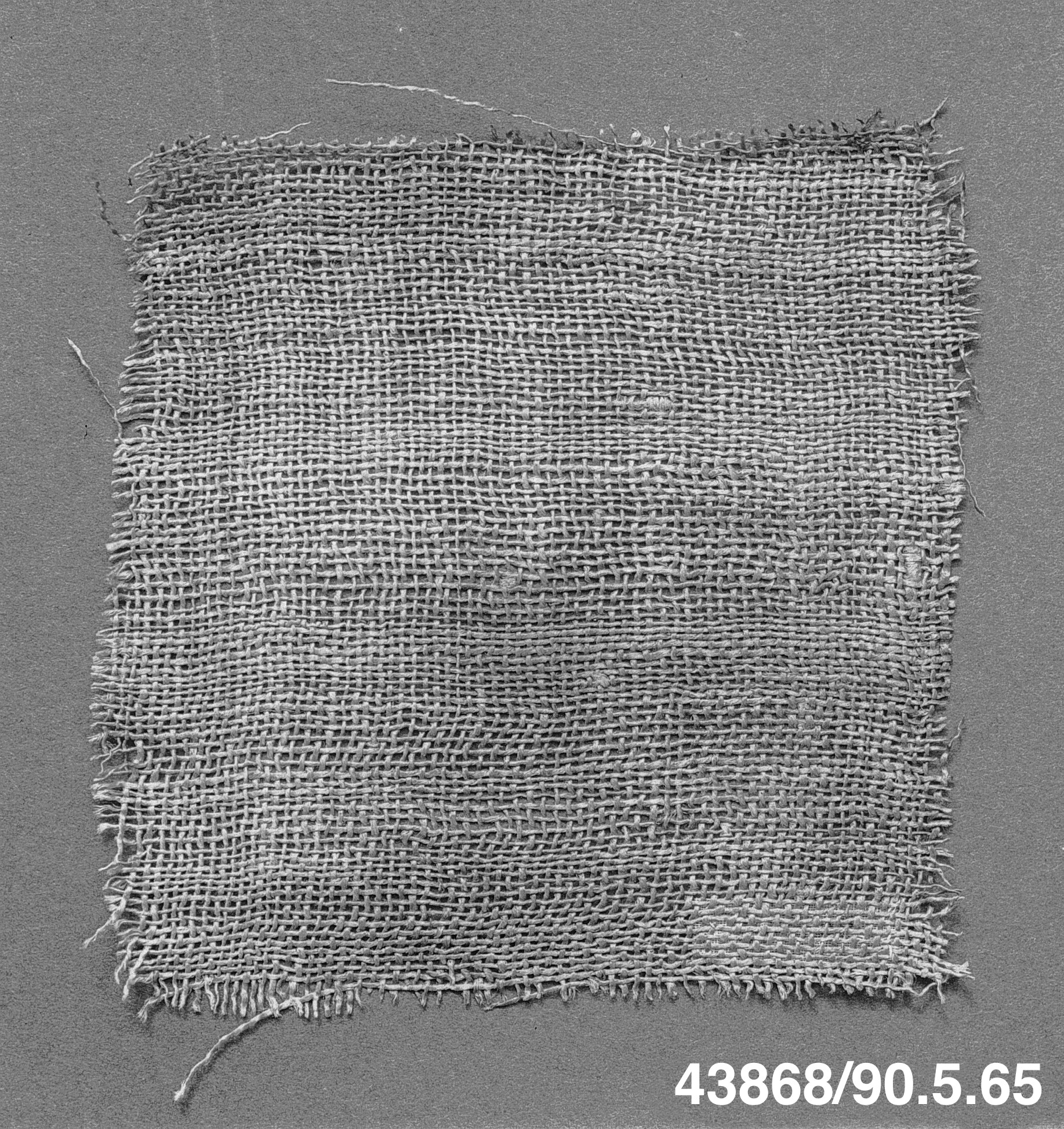
Linen (flax) cloth that was used in mummification.

Flax is believed to be the oldest fiber that was used to create textiles, as it was found in the tombs of mummies from as early as 6500 B.C. The fibers from the flax are taken from the filaments in the stem of the plant, spun together to create long strands, and then woven into long pieces of linen that were used from anything from bandages to clothing and tapestries. Each fiber's length depends on the height of the leaf that it is serving, with 10 filaments in a bundle serving each leaf on the plant. Each filament is the same thickness, giving it a consistency that is ideal for spinning yarn. The yarn was best used on warping boards or warping reels to create large pieces of cloth that could be dyed and woven into different patterns to create elaborate tapestries and embroideries. One example of how linen was used is in the picture of a bandage that a mummy was wrapped in, dated between 305 and 30 B.C. Some of the bandages were painted with hieroglyphs if the person being buried was of importance to the community.

=== Cotton ===
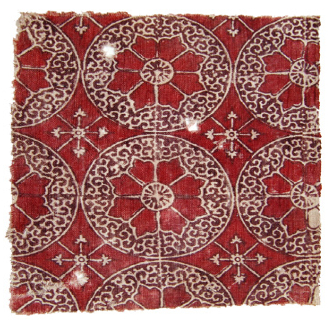
Cotton tapestry that was woven into an intricate pattern in India

Cotton was first used in 5000 B.C. in India and the Middle East, and spread to Europe after they invaded India in 327 B.C. The manufacture and production of cotton spread rapidly in the 18th century, and it quickly became one of the most important textile fibers because of its comfort, durability, and absorbency. Cotton fibers are seed hairs formed in a capsule that grows after the plant flowers. The fibers complete their growth cycle and burst to release about 30 seeds that each have between 200 and 7000 seed hairs that are between 22 and 50 millimeters long. About 90% of the seed hairs are cellulose, with the other 10% being wax, pectate, protein, and other minerals. Once it is processed, cotton can be spun into yarn of various thicknesses to be woven or knitted into various different products such as velvet, chambray, corduroy, jersey, flannel, and velour that can be used in clothing tapestries, rugs, and drapes, as shown in the image of the cotton tapestry that was woven in India.

== Plant fiber identification in ancient textiles ==
Light microscopy, normal transmission electron microscopy, and most recently scanning electron microscopy (SEM) are used to study ancient textile remains to determine what natural fibers were used to create them. Once textiles are found, the fibers are teased out using a light microscope and an SEM is used to look for characteristics in the textile that show what plant it is made of. In flax, for example, scientists look for longitudinal striations that show the cells of the plant stem and cross striations and nodes that are specific to flax fibers. Cotton is identified by the twist that occurs in the seed hairs when the fibers are dried to be woven. This knowledge helps us to learn where and when the cultivation of plants that are used in textiles first occurred, confirming the previous knowledge that was gained from studying the era in which different textile arts aligned with from a perspective of design.

== Future of plants in textile art ==
While plant use in textile art is still common today, there are new innovations being developed, such as Suzanne Lee's art installation "BioCouture". Lee uses fermentation to create a plant-based paper sheet that can be cut and sewn just like cloth- ranging in thickness from thin plastic-like materials up to thick leather-like sheets. The garments are "disposable" because they are made entirely of plant based products and are completely biodegradable. Within her project, Lee places a large emphasis on making the clothing look fashionable by using avant-garde style and natural dyes made from fruits because compostable clothing is not appealing to most shoppers. In addition, there is a possibility to create designs with the plants by tearing or cutting the growing sheet and allowing it to heal to create a pattern made of scars on the textile. The possibilities to use this textile in art installations is incredible because artists would have the ability to create a living art piece, such as Lee does with her clothing.

== Textile arts by region ==
- For articles on textile arts by region, see.

== List of contemporary textile artists ==
- Magdalena Abakanowicz (1930-2017)
- Olga de Amaral (born 1932)
- Caroline Achaintre (born 1969)
- Alicja (Alice) Kozłowska (born 2000)
- Anni Albers (1899-1994)
- Ian Berry (born 1984)
- Alighiero Boetti (1940-1994)
- Pauline Burbidge (born 1950)
- Nick Cave (born 1959)
- Nancy Crow (born 1943)
- Tracey Emin (born 1963)
- Rodrigo Franzao (born 1982)
- Sheila Hicks (born 1934)
- Clare Hunter (born 1950)
- Britta Marakatt-Labba (born 1951)
- Lisa Kokin (born 1954)
- Mascha Mioni (born 1941)
- Martha Mood (1908-1972)
- María Teresa Muñoz Guillén
- Martin Nannestad Jørgensen (born 1959)
- Grayson Perry
- Zoarinivo Razakatrimo (1956-2020)
- Erin M. Riley (born 1985)
- Faith Ringgold (1930-2024)
- Carole Sabiston (born 1939)
- Judith Scott (1943-2005)
- Kiki Smith (born 1954)
- Joana Vasconcelos (born 1971)
- Yoshiko Iwamoto Wada (born 1944)
- Brent Wadden (born 1979)
- Pae White (born 1963)
- Qualeasha Wood (born 1966)
- Billie Zangewa (born 1973)

== Textile arts exhibitions ==
- Fabric of a Nation: American Quilt Stories (2021–2022), at the Museum of Fine Arts, Boston.
- Woven Histories: Textiles and Modern Abstraction (2024) explored the intersection of woven textiles and abstract art. The exhibit was organized by the National Gallery of Art, in collaboration with Museum of Modern Art, Los Angeles County Museum of Art and the National Gallery of Canada.
- Textile Art Redefined (2026), curated by Helen Adams at the Saatchi Gallery, explored contemporary textile art including quilting, weaving, embroidery, knitting and crochet.
- Handwork: The Material Intelligence of Touch (2026), curated by Carrie Burckle, at Marks Art Gallery, College of the Desert.

== Gallery ==
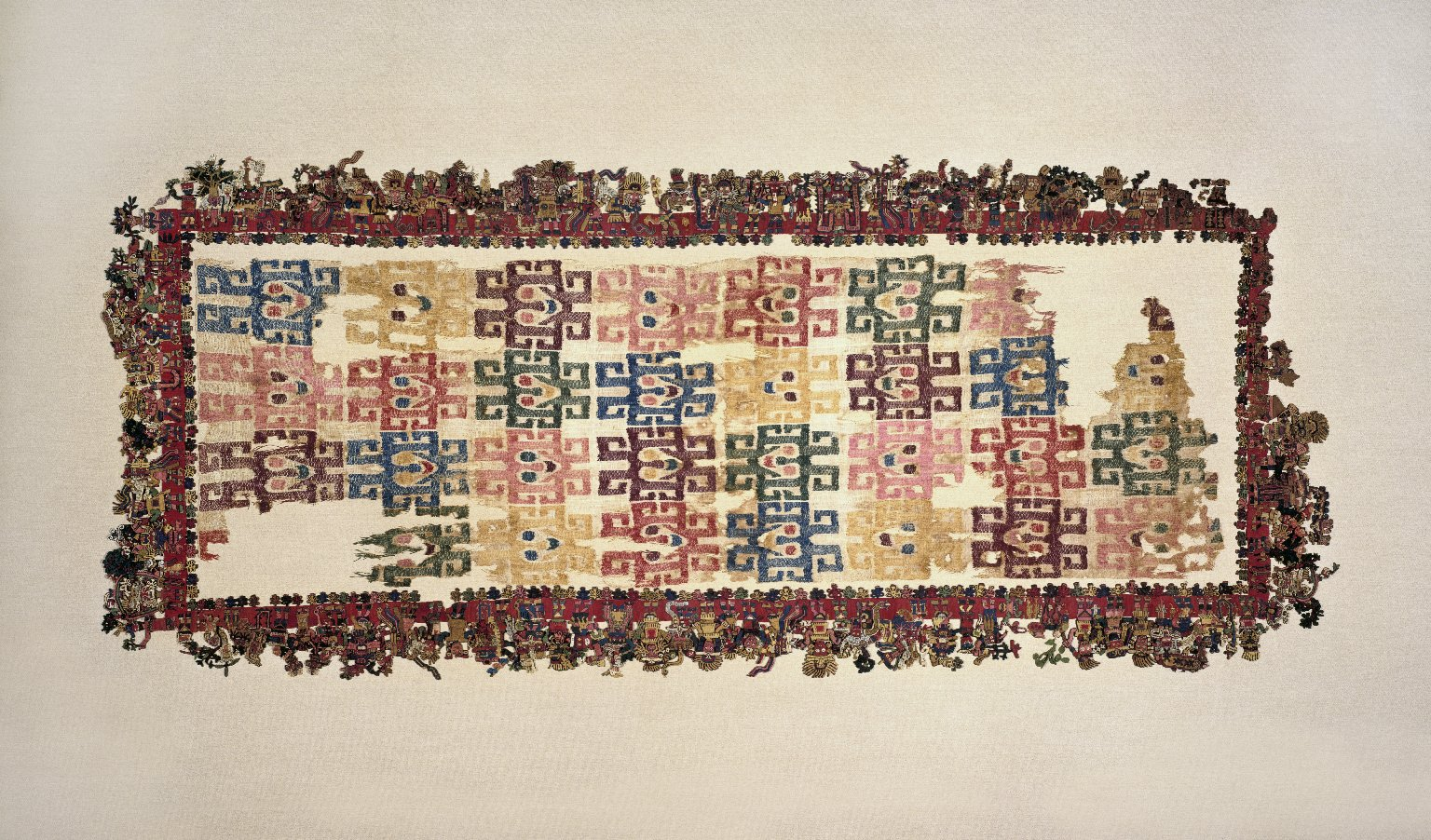
Mantle ("The Paracas Textile"), 100–300 C.E., Brooklyn Museum

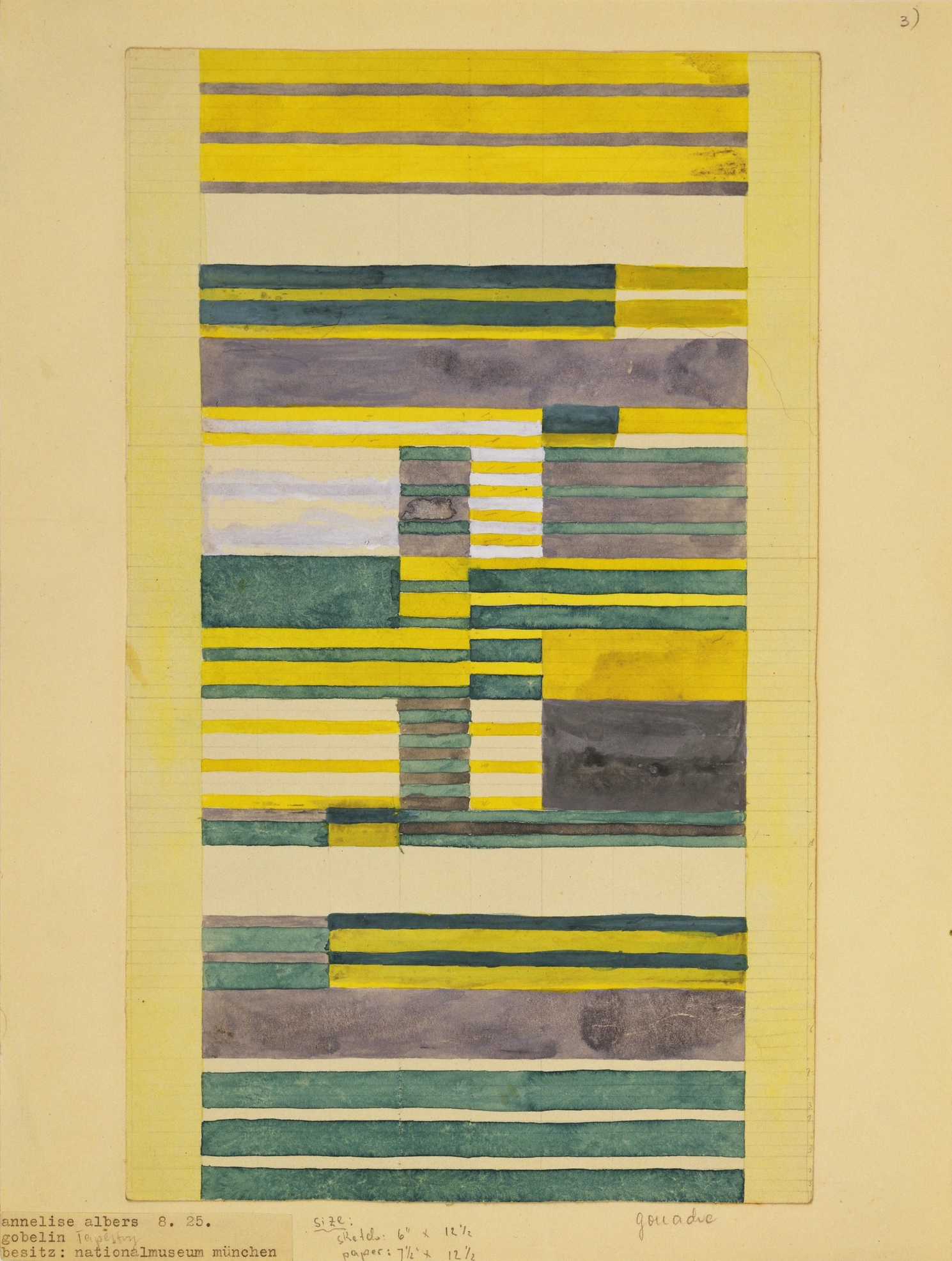
Anni Albers, Design for Wall Hanging, 1925

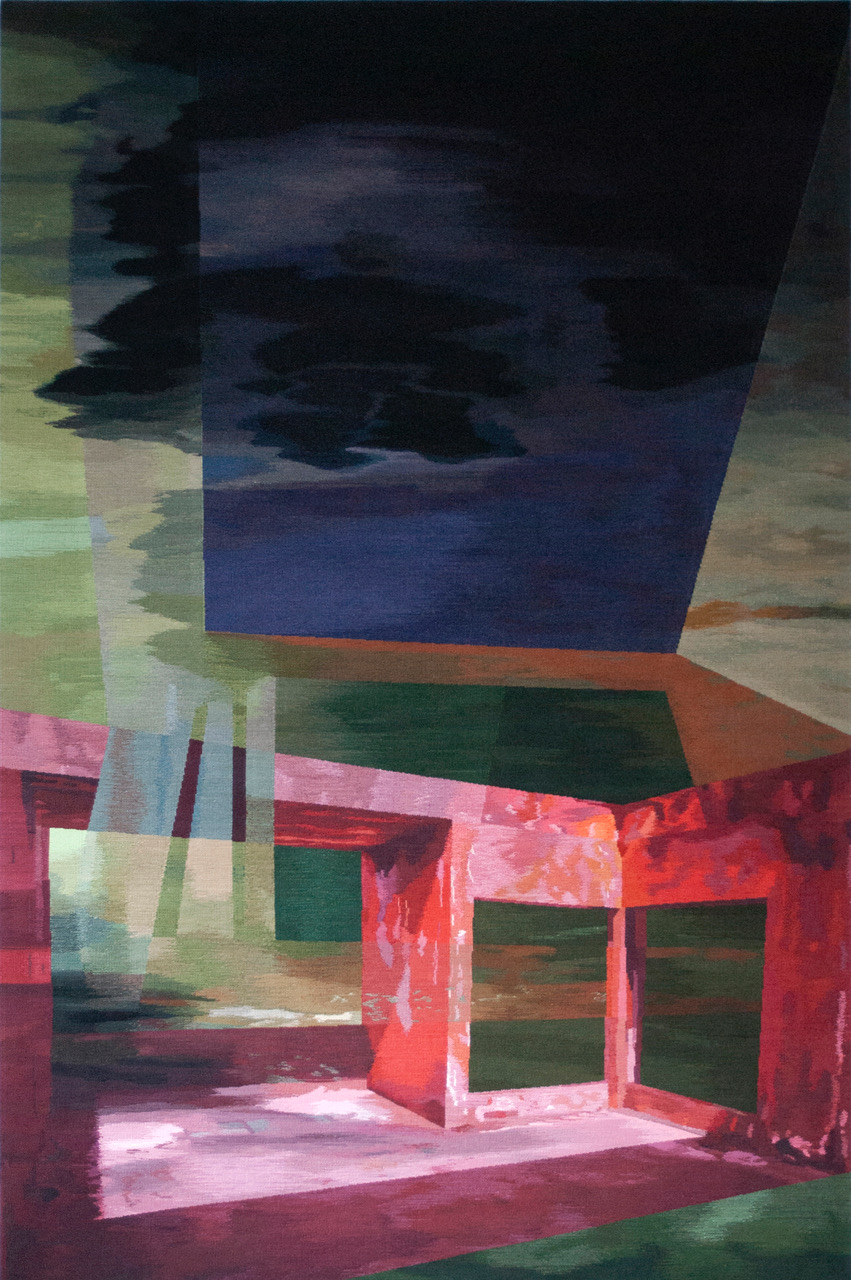
Casino Bokor, Tapestry by Martin Nannestad, 2014

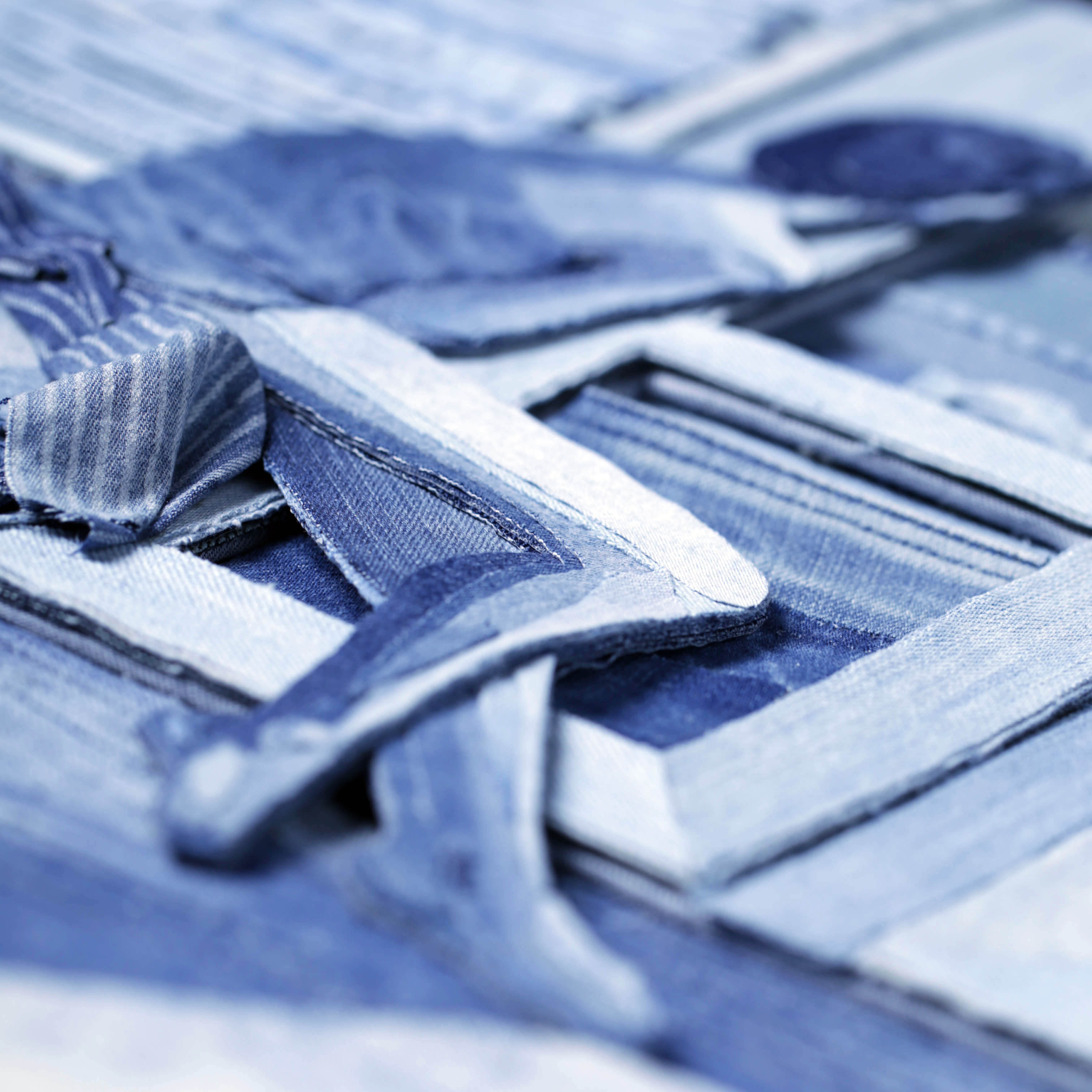
Detail of Ian Berry's work

== See also ==
- Craftivism
- Dramatic arts
- Handicraft
- History of clothing and textiles
- Plastic arts
- Visual arts
