= Book art (fine art) =

Book art (or book arts) is a field of fine art that involves the creation of works that use or refer to the structural and conceptual properties of books. The term is also used to describe works of art produced in this field. These works may contain text, images, or both, or they may be sculptural. Book art has existed for thousands of years, and can be seen, for example, in Egyptian papyri, in Chinese, Japanese and Korean scrolls and books, and in Mesoamerican codices. As a field of contemporary art, book art has seen explosive growth since the 1960s. The related term "book arts" refers to the creative and craft disciplines used to produce book art, such as printing, printmaking, papermaking, typography and bookbinding.

American colleges began offering book art programs in the 1980s, including the MFA program at the University of Alabama and the MFA in book art and creative writing at Mills College in Oakland, CA. The College Book Art Association, founded in 2008, organizes annual conferences, publishes an open access journal titled Openings: Studies in Book Art, and maintains the blog Book Art Theory.

Organizations that exhibit, teach and promote book art include the Center for Book Arts in New York City, the Minnesota Center for Book Arts in Minneapolis and the San Francisco Center for the Book.

There are several sub-fields within book art, including fine press books, sculptural bookworks, artist's books, altered books, designer bookbinding, installations and performances. Fine press book art follows in the tradition of the book as precious object. Publishers like William Morris's Kelmscott Press, active as part of the British Arts and Crafts movement, was an important precursor to fine press book art. Examples of 20th century fine press book art include works published by Arron Press and The Gahenna Press.

== See also ==
- Artist's book
