= Altered book =

Artwork created from repurposed books

An altered book is a form of mixed media artwork that transforms a physical book from its original form into a different form, altering its appearance and/or meaning.

An altered book artist takes a book and modifies it in any of various ways, such as cutting, tearing or folding, or embedding objects. Altered books can be sculptural, wearable, disassembled, or turned into a different book format. Altered books are a subset of the genre artist's books.

In a 2005 Fiberarts Journal essay, Debra Riley Parr writes,

"A subset of the artists' book is the altered book, in which the starting material is an already published book. Any book, old or new, can become an altered book. The transformation can involve any number of interventions—from adding materials to erasing and cutting out bits of the original. Thin pages can be glued together to create supports for collages, painting, and other materials; bindings can be snipped, pages cut and burned, folded, and subjected to all manner of treatments.

"Books can be subjected to the elements, left to rot in the rain or to disintegrate in the ocean. The degree of alteration can be minimal, even delicate, creating a kind of palimpsest through which the original can be glimpsed. Or the transformation can be a total obliteration of what was there.

"Medieval Italian monks scraped clean the pages of old manuscripts and wrote new texts on the valuable parchment. William Burroughs’s method of writing involved a disruptive violence toward the printed work on the pages of books; he cut pages into pieces and rearranged them so that the text came together in new ways."

An example of altered books can be found in the mysterious paper sculptures left in various cultural institutions in Scotland, such as the Scottish Poetry Library and the National Library of Scotland.

Examples of altered books may be found in book arts anthologies such as 500 handmade books : inspiring interpretation of a timeless form, and Masters: Book Arts.

== Altered book artists ==
- Alicia Bailey
- Sarah Bryant
- Brian Dettmer
- Elsi Vassdal Ellis
- Lisa Kokin
- Guy Laramée
- Pamela Paulsrud
- Tom Phillips
- Susan Porteous
- Robin Price
- Jacqueline Rush Lee
- Nanette Wylde

== Altered book exhibitions ==
California gallerist, Donna Seager exhibits artists' books and altered book artists since the early 2000s. Nanette Wylde has curated Conceptually Bound, exhibitions of altered books and artists' books beginning in 2001. An exhibition of altered books by contemporary artists was shown at the Bellevue Arts Museum in 2009, titled The Book Borrowers. It contained 31 works, books transformed into sculptural works. The John Michael Kohler Arts Center was to host an exhibition of altered books in early 2010. The University of South Dakota has held annual exhibitions of contemporary altered books since 2012.

== See also ==
- Artist's book
- Found object
