= Susan Lee =

Susan, Sue, Susie, or Suzanne Lee may refer to:

- Susan Lee (politician) (born 1954), American politician
- Sue French-Lee (born 1960), Canadian long-distance runner
- Susan Lee (rowing) (born 1966), Australian rowing coxswain
- Susie Lee (born 1966), American politician
- Suzanne Lee (born 1970), American fashion designer
- Sunny (singer) (Susan Soonkyu Lee) (born 1989), Korean-American singer

== See also ==
- Sussan Ley (born 1961, pronounced the same as "Susan Lee"), Australian politician
