= Central Library, Edinburgh =

Public library in Edinburgh

Edinburgh Central Library
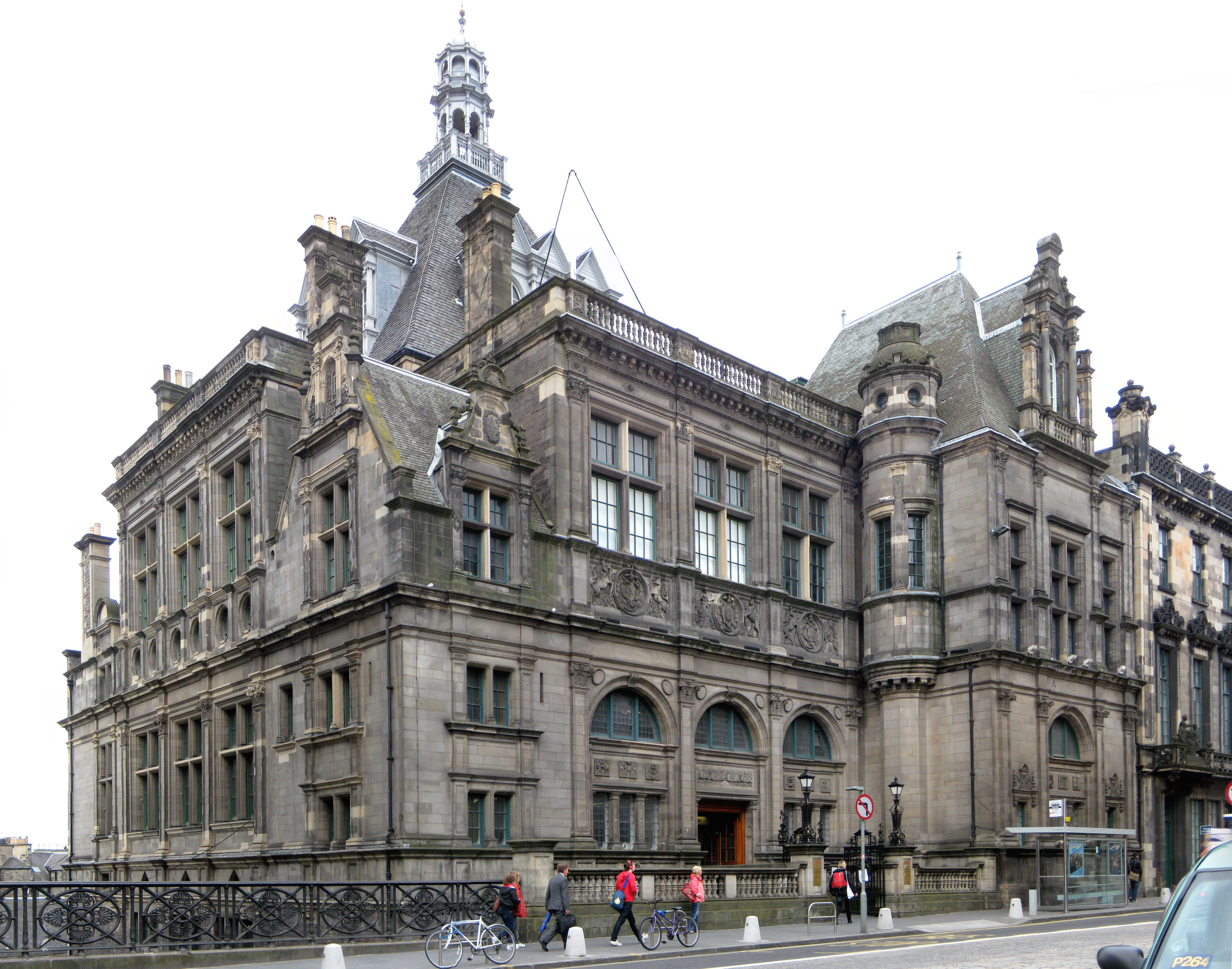
- 55°56′54″N 3°11′33″W
- Location: George IV Bridge; Edinburgh; EH1 1EG, United Kingdom
- Type: Public library
- Established: 1890

Other information
- Website: https://www.edinburgh.gov.uk/centrallibrary

Central Library in Edinburgh, Scotland, opened in 1890, was the first public library building in the city. Edinburgh Central library comprises six libraries: Lending, Reference, Music, Art and Design, Edinburgh and Scottish, and the Children's Library.

== History ==
Today there are 28 public libraries in Edinburgh but, as the first to open in the Scottish capital, the creation of Central Library was funded with £50,000 by philanthropist Andrew Carnegie. At the opening ceremony a telegram from Carnegie was read out stating: "We trust that this Library is to grow in usefulness year after year, and prove one of the most potent agencies for the good of the people for all time to come."

The site selected for the library was the former home of Sir Thomas Hope, 1st Baronet Hope of Craighall, advocate for King Charles I. The structure, built in 1616, was demolished in March 1887 to make way for the library. The lintel from Hope's home, bearing the carved inscription TECUM HABITA 1616 from the fourth satire of Persius, is preserved above an inner doorway of the library.

Carnegie's funding was initially an offer of £25,000 in 1886 which was doubled, overcoming prior opposition to the establishment of a public library. The city—last of those to do so in Scotland—adopted the Public Libraries Act and on 9 July 1887. Carnegie laid the foundation stone of architect George Washington Browne's French Renaissance-styled building.

Washington Browne's design was the winning entry in the architectural competition for the new library and was selected from 37 submissions. His grand building stands three levels tall above George IV Bridge and reaches down to the Cowgate below, spanning the disjointed streets of Edinburgh's Old Town.

Above the main door is the motto, "Let there be Light" which Carnegie insisted was placed above the entrance to every library he funded. The facade of Central Library is also decorated with stone carvings depicting the coat of arms of the City of Edinburgh, Coat of Arms of Scotland and the Royal Arms. There are nine small square reliefs relating to printers and a large sculpture of Caledonia by Alexander Handyside Ritchie.

Records for 1890, the first full year the library was open, show that over 440,000 book loans were issued.

Central Library has been adapted and expanded many times over the years. Only a year after opening, the library was already running out of space and a book store was added in 1903. By 1928, the library was short of space again. Proposals were made for a better use of the space and a public lift was installed.

In 1930, the adjacent building at No.3 George IV Bridge was acquired allowing the library to expand again. Further nearby premises were bought in the 1940s. In 1961 a mezzanine level was created above the former Newspaper Room.

In May 2014, the new children's and music libraries were opened within the main library building. These had previously been housed in a separate building on George IV Bridge. The children's library features a wall graphic by award-winning children's book illustrator Catherine Rayner.

In November 2017, on the 100th anniversary of her death, a memorial to Dr Elsie Inglis, the founder of the Scottish Women's Hospitals, was unveiled at Central Library.

== Collections ==
As with all public libraries in Edinburgh, adult collections are organised using the Library of Congress Classification system. Since Wigan dropped the system during a 1974 local government reorganisation, Edinburgh is the only municipality in the UK continuing to use it. Children's books are organised under the more-widespread Dewey Decimal Classification scheme.

Edinburgh Central Library holds in its collections three of the Scottish book sculptures, which are on display on the mezzanine of the Music Library. The sculptures were the work of an anonymous artist who left these artworks among a series of other in literary venues during the Edinburgh International Book Festival in 2011. The sculptures in the collection depict a magnifying glass, a teacup and a small figure 'lost in a book'.

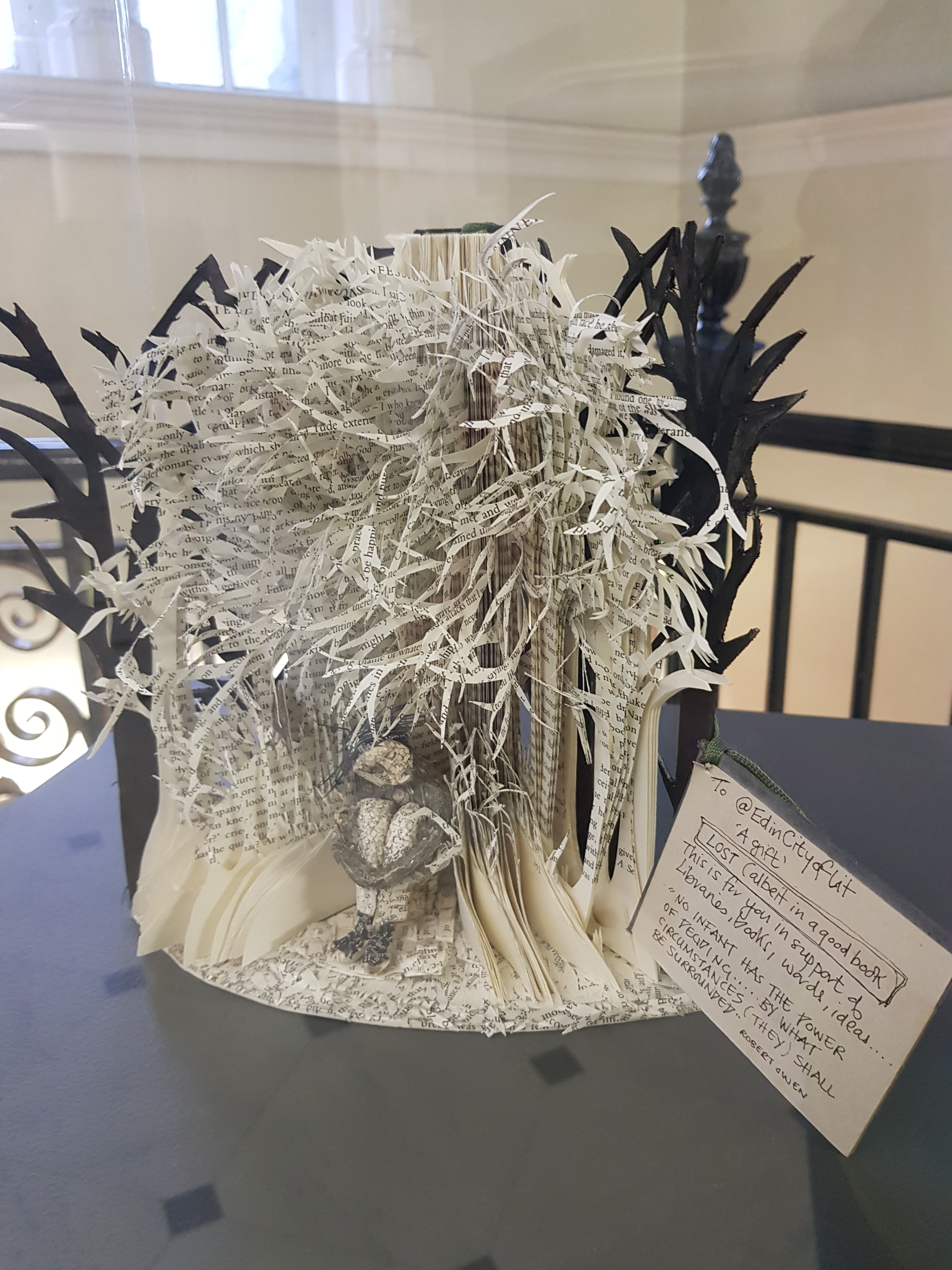
Lost in a good book..., 2011

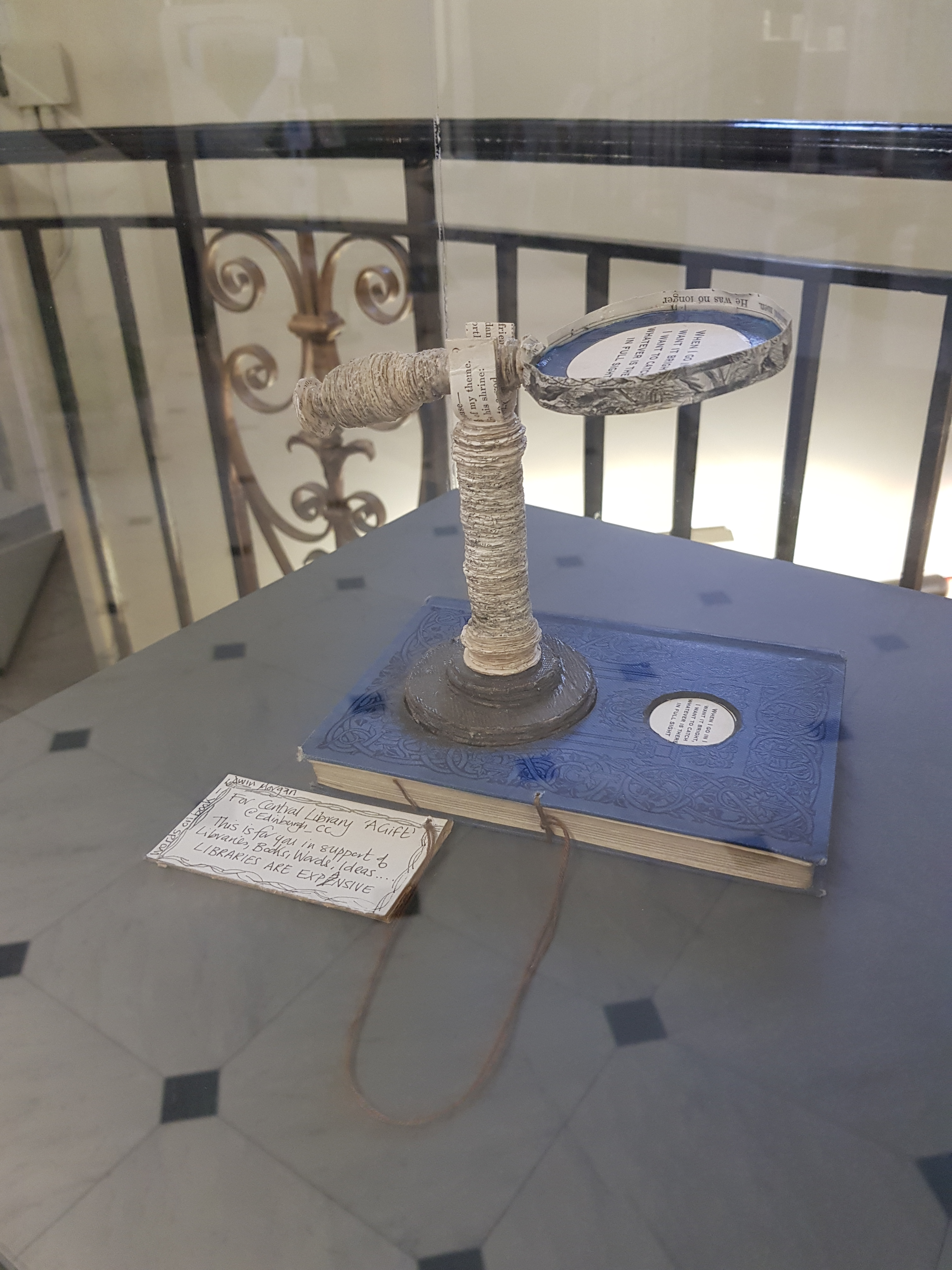
Magnifying glass, 2011

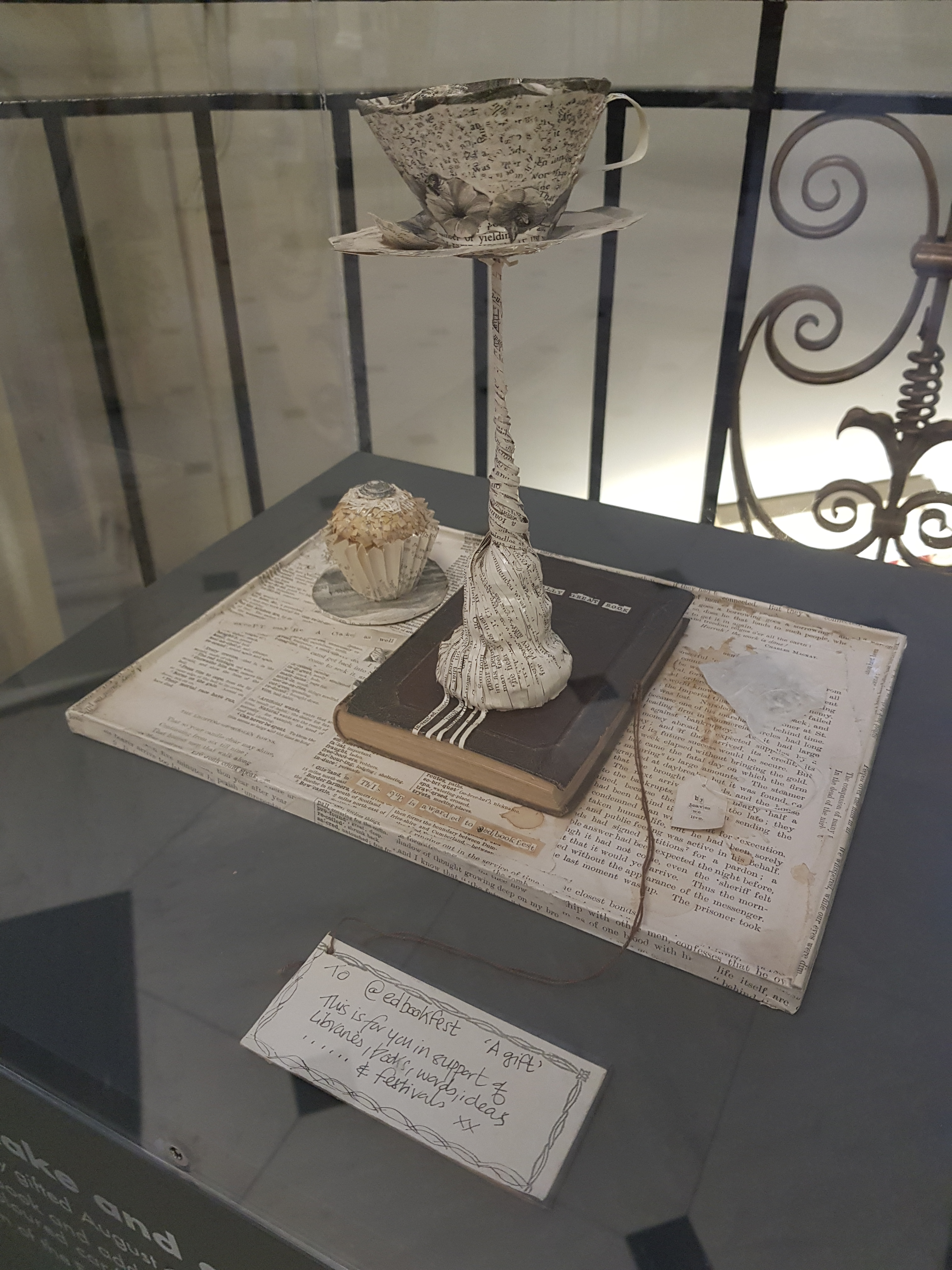
Tea, cake and a book, 2011

== Art and Design Library ==
Based with in the Central Library building, the Art and Design Library features collections focusing on architecture, design, fine art, photography, and more. There is also a collection of Artist Books.

Within the Art and Design Library, patrons can find study space to utilize and "exhibition space for local artists and groups" is available.

== Central Children's Library ==
Based within the Central Library building, the Children's Library is focused on providing resources for younger patrons including books and DVDs. The Children's Library offers programmes such as story times, rhyme times, and "Chatterbooks book group for 8 to 11 year olds."

== Music Library ==
Based within the Central Library building, the Music Library contains "the largest collection of publicly accessible material on music and dance in Scotland including sheet music, books and recorded music on CD, DVD, and streaming" through the Naxos Music Library. Patrons can also book "digital pianos, drums and keyboards" or music practice space.

In partnership with the Tinderbox Orchestra, the Music Library offers a collection of musical instruments available for library patrons to borrow. Available instruments include "saxophones, trombones, clarinets, flutes, keyboards, accordions, guitars, ukuleles, violins and cellos." The instruments have been donated by the local community and the library has put out the call for additional instruments, especially "if you have an instrument gathering dust, please consider donating it to" the Music Library.

== Filming Location ==
Edinburgh Central Library was used as a filming location for the TV series Rebus, during episode one Black & Blue. Outside building shots were taken and as well as a scene in the reference section.

== Gallery ==
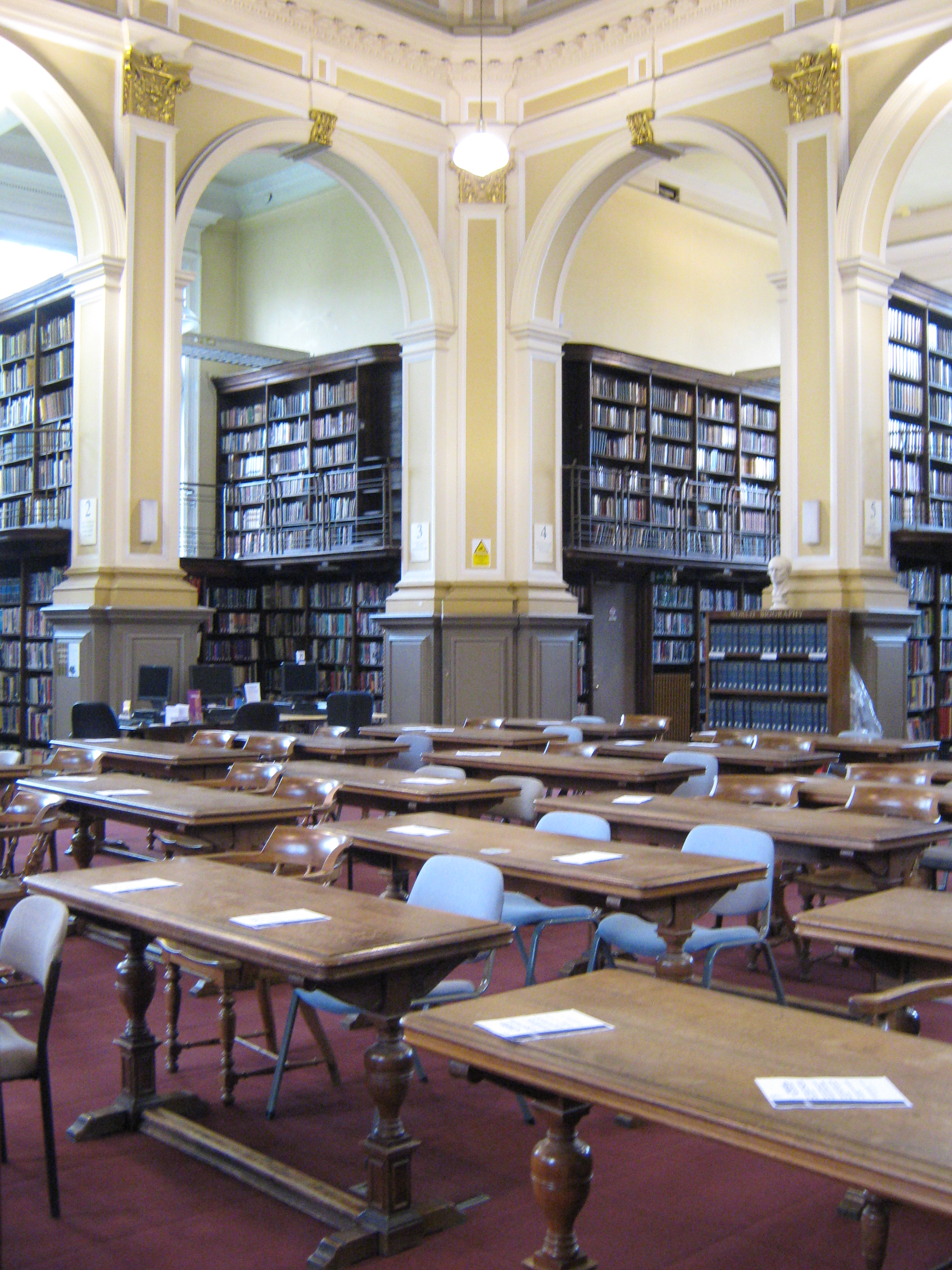
Upper Floor Reference Library with original card indices and an abundance of natural lighting

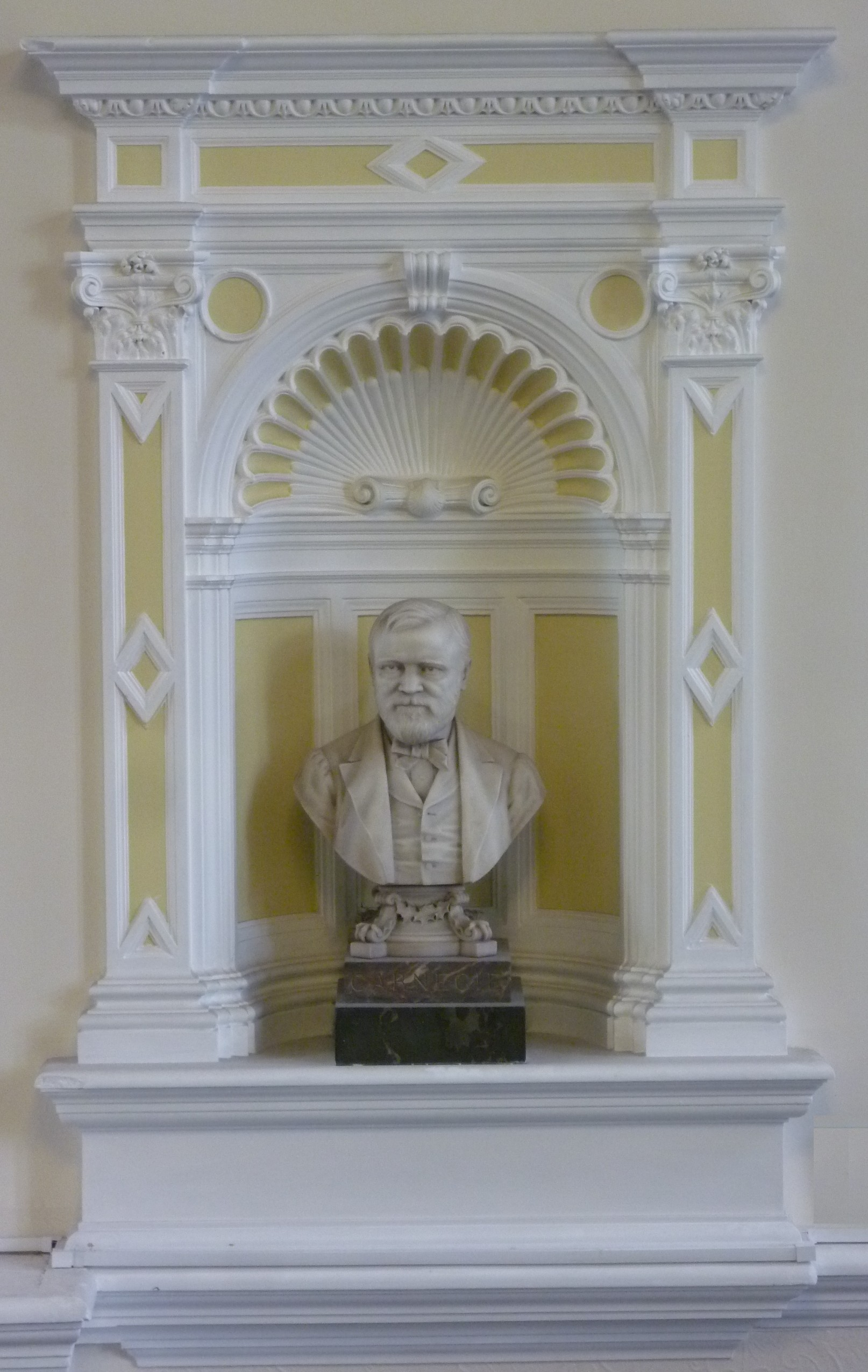
Andrew Carneige bust

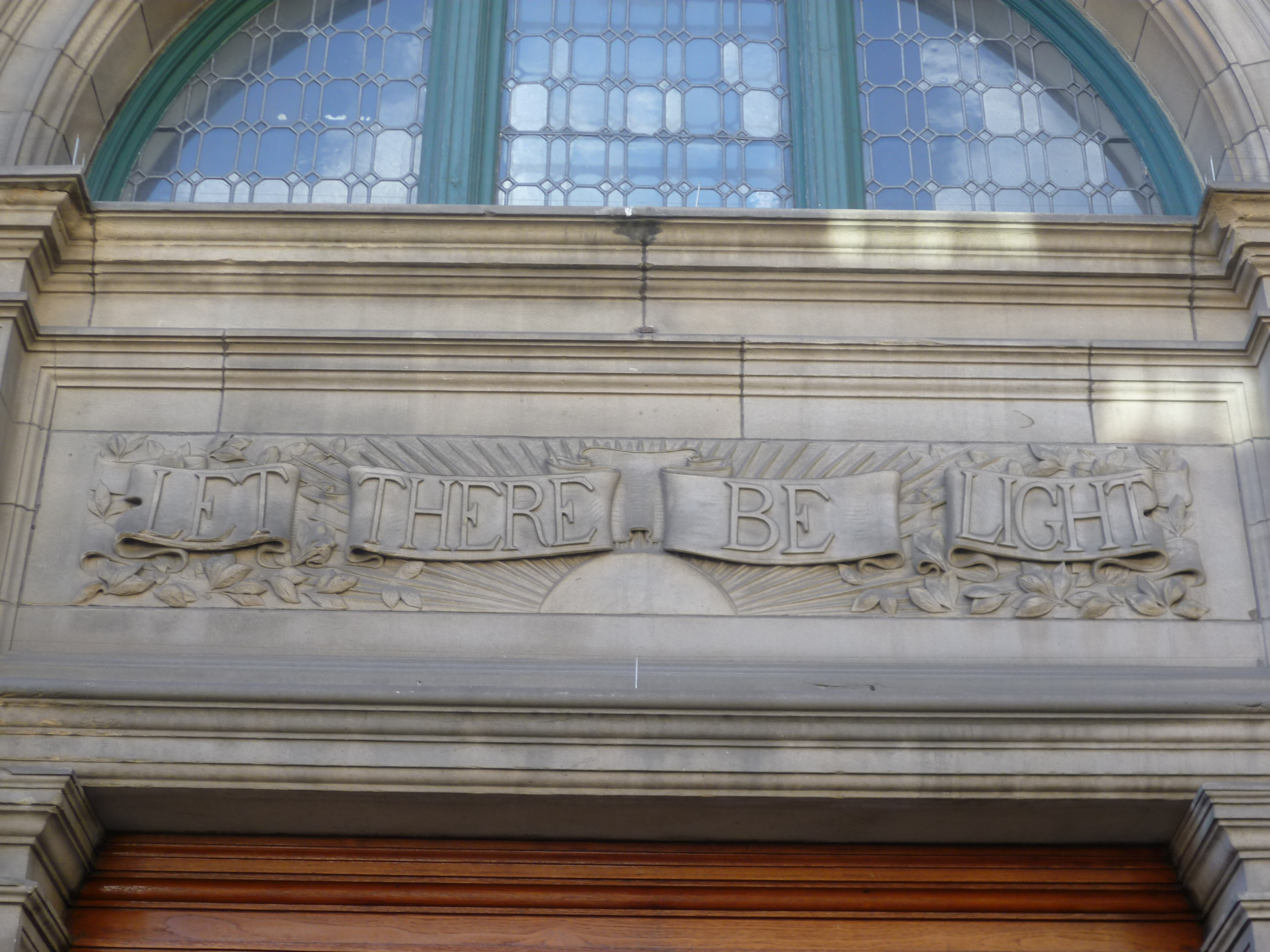
Andrew Carnegie motto - Let There Be Light

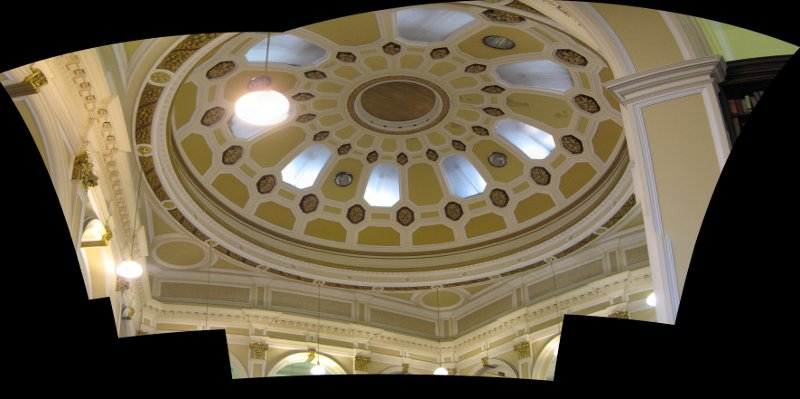
Domed ceiling

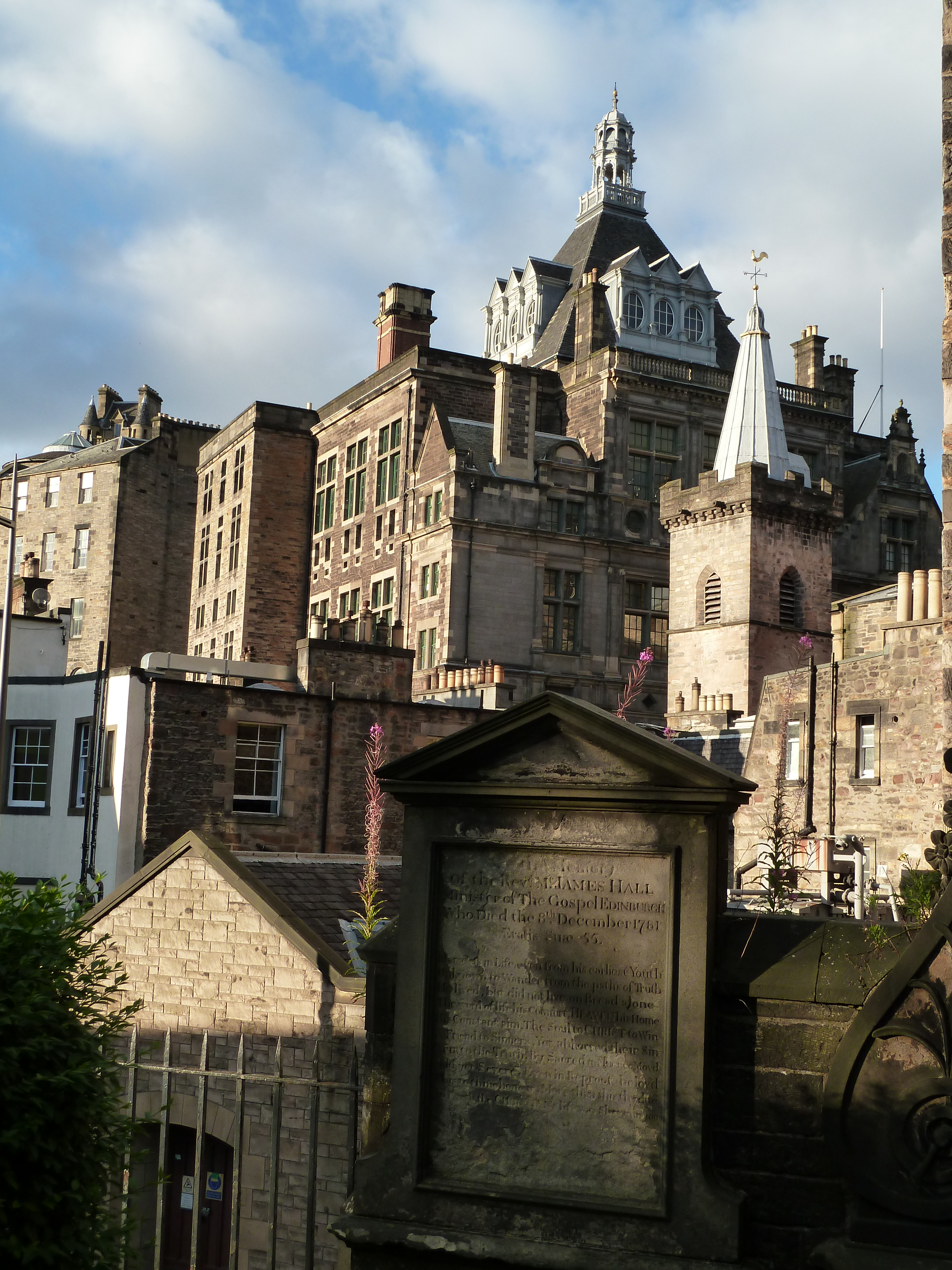
Central Library and St Mary Magdalene Chapel viewed from Greyfriars Kirkyard

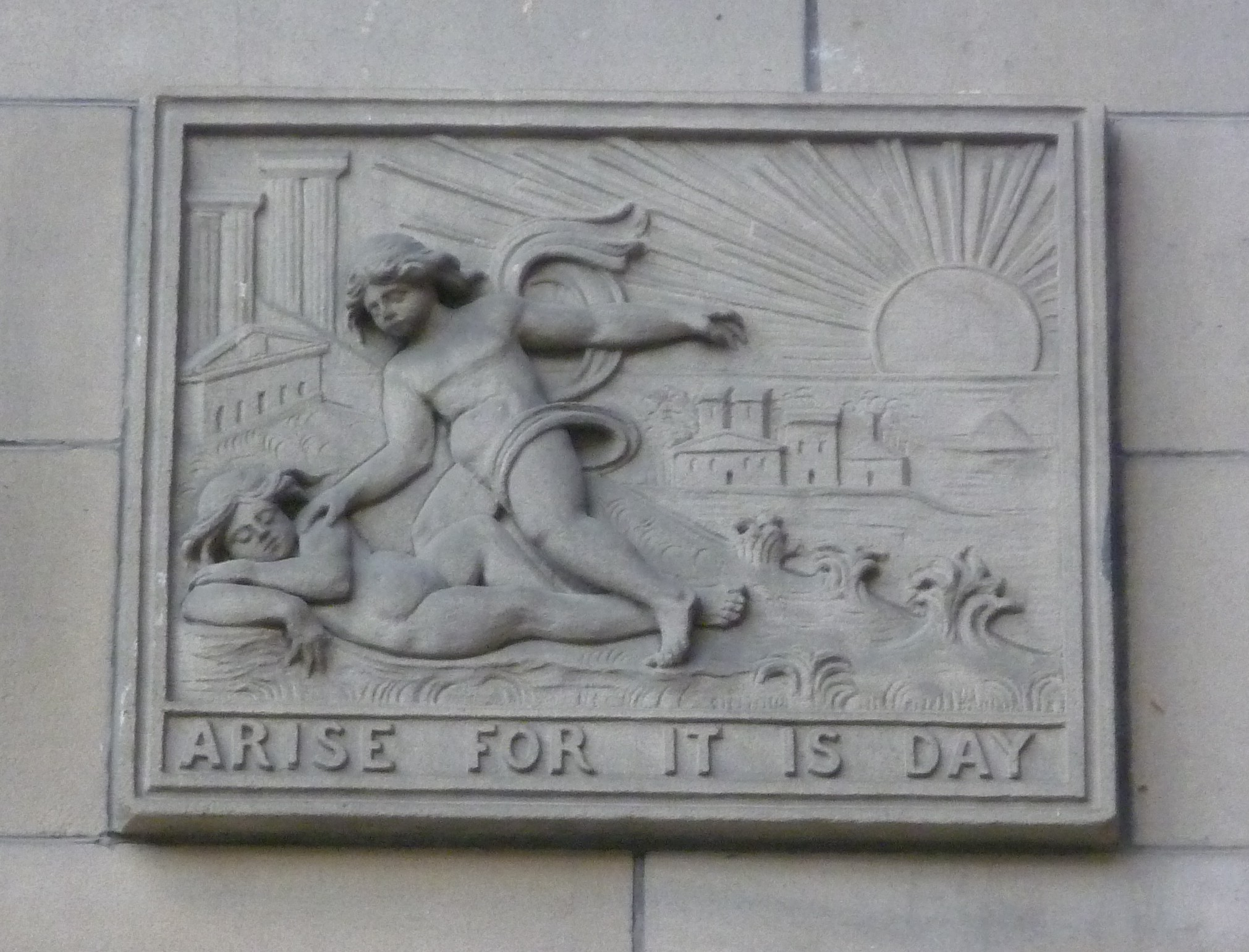
John Day's motto on the facade of Edinburgh Central Library.

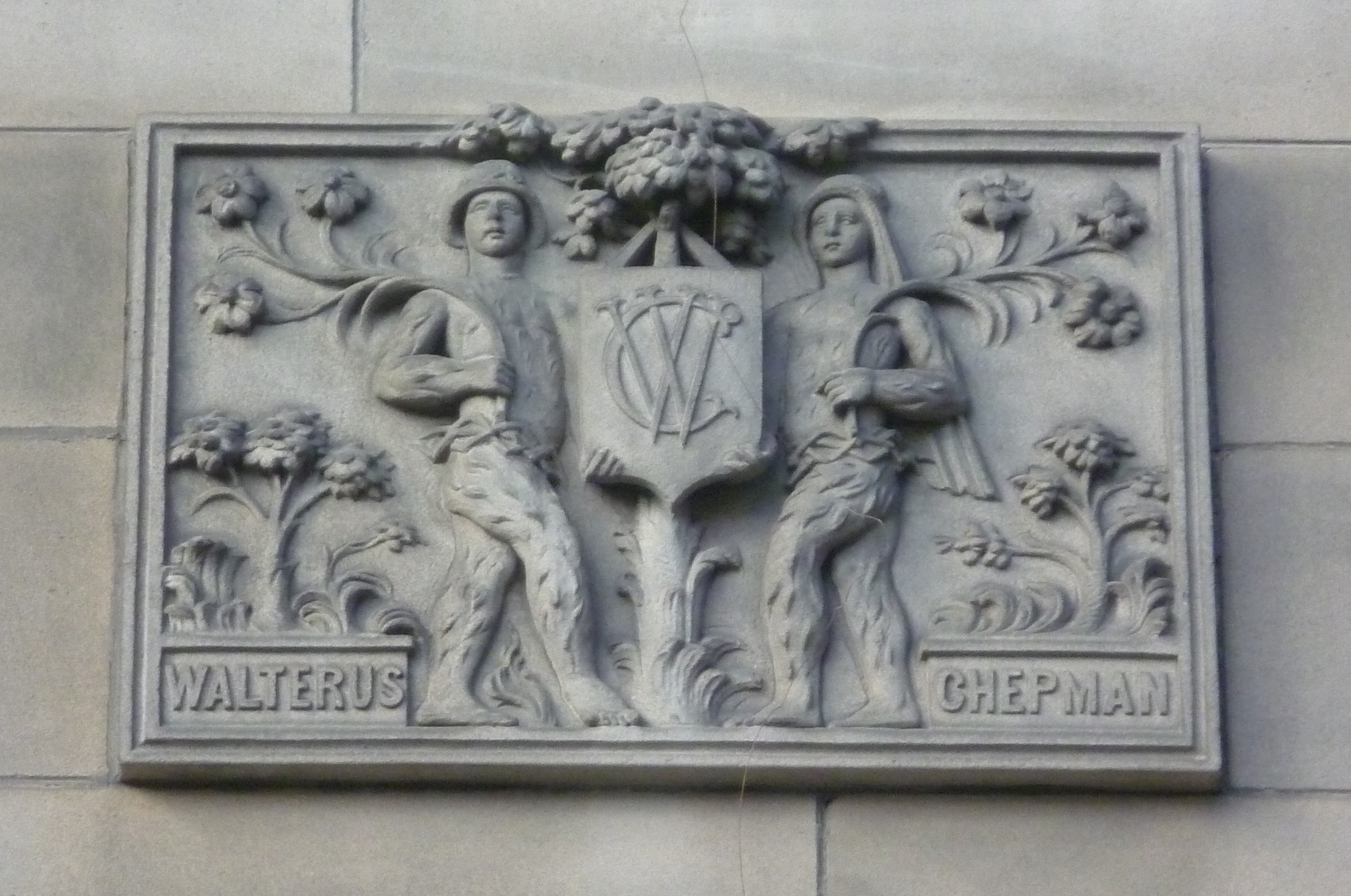
Walter Chepman tablet, Edinburgh Central Library

== Bibliography ==
- Armstrong, Norma; White, Alan (1990). Lum hats in paradise: Edinburgh City Libraries, 1890–1990. Edinburgh: Edinburgh City Libraries.
- Aitken, W.R. (1971). A history of the public library movement in Scotland to 1955. Glasgow: School Library Association.
- Edinburgh Public Libraries 1890–1950: A Handbook and History of Sixty Years Progress. Edinburgh Public Libraries Committee. 1951.
