= María Teresa Muñoz Guillén =

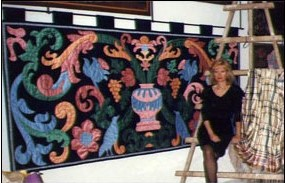
- The artist in her atelier
- Born: Sariñena, Huesca, Spain
- Other name: Mayte Muñoz Guillén
- Education: University of Zaragoza
- Known for: Textile arts and tapestry
- Website: english.tapicesmtm.com

María Teresa Muñoz Guillén (born in Sariñena, Huesca, Spain) is a Spanish textile artist based in New York, Naples, Florida, and Zaragoza. She is best known for the creation and restoration of textile art in classic and contemporary styles. Muñoz Guillén is credited for having recovered and refined the original medieval textile art and executed it with antique and modern noble materials.

== Education ==
Muñoz Guillén attended the University of Zaragoza, where she studied philosophy and literary history.

== Career ==
As of 2018, Muñoz Guillén was the official researcher of the Directorate of Fine Arts, Archives, and Libraries of Spain at the Ministry of Education, Culture, and Sports.

=== Art ===
Muñoz Guillén has stated that her background in history greatly influenced her artistic career. In 2018, Muñoz Guillén showed her work at Vatican's Palazzo della Cancelleria in Rome, becoming the first contemporary women textile artist to exhibit in the Vatican.

==== Works ====
Muñoz Guillén's tapestries and restorations are permanently exhibited in the central government and autonomous communities of Spain, France and Italy, as well as in financial institutions, European universities, museums, churches, basilicas, cathedrals and monasteries and she has done commissions for other government institutions and private collections from Spain, USA, Canada, Switzerland, Uruguay, UK, France, Colombia, Latvia, Italy, Japan, The Philippines, North Macedonia and Sweden.

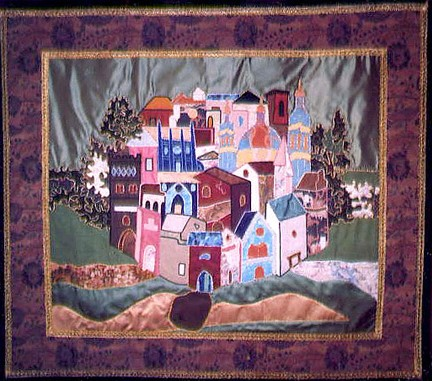
Government gift to S.R.A. Infanta Elena de Borbón

Her works includes the realization of the Coat of arms of Aragon in original medieval techniques. The tapestry was commissioned by the parliament of Aragón (Aragonese Corts) and presented at the first official visit of Prince Felipe de Borbón (now King Felipe VI of Spain) who praised Muñoz Guillén's realization. Her work presided the parliamentary sessions in the Palace of the Aljafería from 2000 to 2006 when it was removed after a polemic about motifs considered offensive by some politicians. At that time, Muñoz Guillén made a spirited defense of her work and its symbolic value. In 2015, the tapestry was returned to its original place in the plenary hall and presides again over the parliamentary sessions of the Cortes.

In 2025, one of her works was destroyed in Los Angeles during the Southern California wildfires.
