= Brian Dettmer =

American artist

- Born: 1974 (age 51–52); Naperville
- Education: Columbia College Chicago
- Known for: Sculpture, Altered book, Found object

Brian Dettmer (born 1974) is an American contemporary artist. He is noted for his alteration of preexisting media—such as old books, maps, record albums, and cassette tapes—to create new, transformed works of visual fine art.

== Life and art ==
Dettmer was born and raised in Naperville, Illinois in 1974. Until 2006, he lived in and around Chicago, where he earned a BA in fine arts from Columbia College Chicago in 1997. During school and following graduation, Dettmer worked as an artist and in positions related to graphics and signage design. In 2006, Dettmer moved with his wife to Atlanta, where he worked as a studio artist. (Brown 2008; Camper 2005). In 2013, Dettmer and his family relocated to New York City, where he continues his work today.

=== Early work ===
As a student, Dettmer focused primarily on painting. When he began to work in a sign shop, his work began to explore the relationship between text, images, language, and codes, including paintings based on braille, Morse Code, and American Sign Language. He then began to make work by repeatedly pasting newspapers and book pages to canvas and tearing off pieces, leaving behind layered fragments. (Sasaki 2009; Brown 2008; Camper 2005). In 2000, Dettmer started to experiment by gluing and cutting into books, the medium for which he is now best known. (Brown 2008).

=== Recent work ===
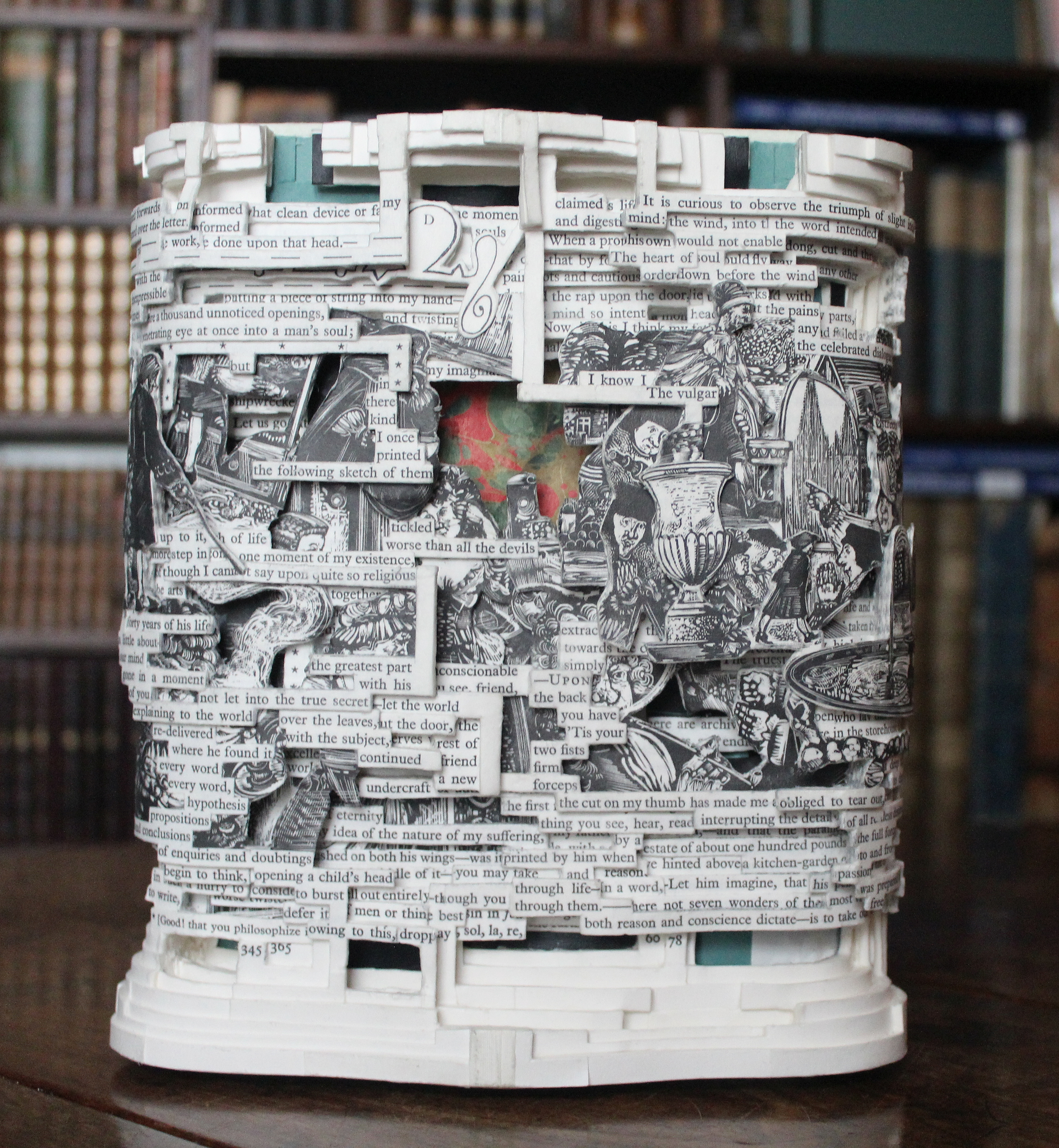
Brian Dettmer's Life and Opinions of Tristram Shandy, Gentleman. Produced during a residency at Shandy Hall

Dettmer's current work involves the appropriation and alteration of media to transform the physical form and/or to selectively remove and reveal content to create new works of fine art. Dettmer explains: "Old books, records, tapes, maps, and other media frequently fall into a realm that too much of today's art occupies. Their intended role has decreased or deceased and they often exist simply as symbols of the ideas they represent rather than true conveyors of content. … When an object's intended function is fleeting, the necessity for a new approach to its form and content arises." (Valdez 2006).

A large body of Dettmer's current work is created by altering books, including older dictionaries, encyclopedias, textbooks, science and engineering books, art books, medical guides, history books, atlases, comic books, wallpaper sample books, and others. Dettmer seals and cuts into the books, exposing select images and text to create intricate three-dimensional derivative works that reveal new or alternative interpretations of the books. Dettmer never inserts or moves any of the books' contents. (Moayeri 2008). This process is performed without pre-planning or mapping out the contents before cutting into the book. (Cullum 2010). As he cuts away unwanted material with knives, tweezers and surgical tools, Dettmer stabilizes the remaining paper with a varnish. (Fox 2009). An early example of Dettmer's altered books is his 2003 work, New International Dictionary, an original 1947 unabridged dictionary sealed and cut to expose images within the dictionary (Sundell 2005, at pg. 70).

Dettmer has subsequently augmented his process by folding, bending, rolling, or stacking one or more books before sealing and cutting them or, in some instances, sanding them to create a variety of forms. Dettmer has also constructed larger sculptures using complete sets of encyclopedias and other reference books.

Other notable examples of media transformed by Dettmer include music cassette tapes melted and formed into a life-sized human skeleton (Tyson 2007) and various animal skulls; cut and layered highway maps of the United States and the Middle East (Packer 2005) and three-dimensional map sculptures; VHS videotapes of gangster movies unraveled and formed into funeral flower arrangements; and a controversial reconfiguration of audio excerpts from George W. Bush's 2002 State of the Union Address. (Feigly 2003).

Brian Dettmer's work has been published and exhibited widely in museums, art centers, and galleries around the world, including the Smithsonian (Washington D.C.), Museum of Arts and Design (New York), Virginia Museum of Contemporary Art (Virginia), Museum of Contemporary Art (Georgia), Museum Rijswijh (Netherlands), Wellcome Collection (United Kingdom), the Bellevue Arts Museum (Washington), The Kohler Arts Center (Wisconsin), the Pérez Art Museum Miami (Florida), and the Illinois State Museum (Illinois). His work can be found in public and private collections in the United States, Latin America, Europe, Australia, and Asia.
