= Scottish book sculptures =

Collection of paper sculptures by an anonymous artist

The first sculpture to be found, known as the 'poetree'

The Scottish book sculptures are a group of book sculptures that were contrived to be "found" in Scotland between 2011 and 2016. The sculptures are on topics mostly concerning Scottish literature and poetry, and are made out of old books by an anonymous female paper sculptor.

The initial group of book sculptures was a group of ten elaborate sculptures that were left around various cultural locations in Edinburgh, between March and November 2011, as gifts to the cultural institutions and people of the city. The identity of the artist is unknown, although notes with some of the sculptures referred to the artist as 'she'. The sculptures were made from old books and were accompanied by gift labels which praised literacy and the love of words, and argued against library and other arts funding cuts. An eleventh sculpture was presented to author Ian Rankin, whose works featured prominently in many of the other sculptures. The ten Edinburgh sculptures were toured through Scotland in an exhibition in late 2012.

The sculptor was then commissioned to produce five more book sculptures to be hidden in secret locations around Scotland as part of Book Week Scotland, which commenced in November 2012. Despite the commission, the artist has maintained her anonymity.

The sculptor also made another gift sculpture in December 2012, which she anonymously presented to the Scottish Poetry Library, already the previous recipient of two of her earlier works.

In May 2013 a new sculpture, featuring three eggs in a paper nest in a cardboard birdbox, was left in the Scottish Poetry library; this was followed by three baby birds in a nest, left at Leith Library. In 2014 a flutter or swarm of butterflies from an open book sculpture was left in aid of the Macmillan charity. This sculpture was bought privately but is intended to tour on a not-for-profit basis in 2015.

== 2011 Edinburgh sculptures ==
These are listed in the order of their discovery. In the first ten cases, the person who deposited the sculptures was not noticed, and some of the sculptures were found several days after they had been put in place. The eleventh was a gift to author Ian Rankin.

=== First sculpture ===
The first sculpture was found on Tuesday 2 March 2011 on a table in the Scottish Poetry Library. It comprised a tree with intricately fashioned branches and leaves, standing on a thick leather-bound old book. At the base of the tree was a paper egg, broken in half and with the inside lined with gold, in which were a scatter of individual words, which could be put together to make "A Trace of Wings", a poem by Edwin Morgan. It was accompanied by a tag, addressed to @byleaveswelive, the name of the Library's Twitter account. "By leaves we live" is a Patrick Geddes quote about the idea that you reap what you sow.

The note on the tag read: "It started with your name @byleaveswelive and became a tree.… … We know that a library is so much more than a building full of books… a book is so much more than pages full of words.… This is for you in support of libraries, books, words, ideas….. a gesture (poetic maybe?)".

The sculpture was nicknamed the "poetree" by the staff at the Library, and despite national publicity, the identity of its maker remained unknown.

=== Second sculpture ===
The second sculpture was found in late June 2011 at the National Library of Scotland, a "delicately crafted" gramophone and a coffin fashioned from a copy of Edinburgh-based author Ian Rankin's book Exit Music.

The note accompanying the sculpture read: "For @natlibscot – A gift in support of libraries, books, words, ideas….. (& against their exit)".

=== Third sculpture ===
Later on in June 2011 a third sculpture was anonymously deposited, this time at the box office of the Edinburgh Filmhouse. This one comprised "a complex scene in a paper cinema; punters arrayed on seats watching men and horses coming alive from the screen and charging outwards." One of the audience had Ian Rankin's face, and was holding a bottle of Deuchars IPA.

The note accompanying the sculpture read: "For @filmhouse – A gift in support of libraries, books, words, ideas….. and all things *magic*". A quote from Francis Ford Coppola, "I think cinema, movies, and magic have always been closely associated" was pasted onto the sculpture.

=== Fourth sculpture ===
The fourth sculpture was found on a windowsill at the Scottish Storytelling Centre. As it lay in a part of the building that does not have much footfall, it may have lain undiscovered at the location for a while, and so its place in the gift chain is uncertain. It comprises a dragon hatching from an egg on a nest of feathers. It is made from a copy of Ian Rankin's book, Knots and Crosses.

The note accompanying the sculpture read: "For @scotstorycentre – A gift in support of libraries, books, works, ideas….. Once upon a time there was a book and in the book was a nest and in the nest was an egg and in the egg was a dragon and in the dragon was a story….."

=== Fifth sculpture ===
The fifth and sixth sculptures were both found on 24 August 2011, at the Edinburgh International Book Festival. The fifth sculpture was left on one of the signing tables in the festival bookshop. It comprised a tea tray bearing a cup of tea on a cake stand, a cupcake, a used teabag and a (real) old book. The teabag was filled with cut out letters, on the tag of which were the words "by leaves we live" (the Twitter name of the Scottish Poetry Library account referenced in the first sculpture). On the top of the tea in the teacup was a spiral swirl of words which read "Nothing beats a nice cup of tea (or coffee) and a really good BOOK", and on the tray next to the cupcake: "except maybe a cake as well".

The note accompanying the sculpture read: "To @edbookfest 'A gift' This is for you in support of libraries, books, words, ideas…… & festivals xx".

=== Sixth sculpture ===
The fifth and sixth sculptures were both found on 24 August 2011, at the Edinburgh International Book Festival. The sixth sculpture was secreted about the Edinburgh UNESCO City of Literature information stand in the entrance tent. It shows a man sitting under a tree. It is made from an Everyman's Library edition of The Private Memoirs and Confessions of a Justified Sinner by James Hogg.

The note accompanying the sculpture read: "To @edincityoflit 'A gift' LOST (albeit in a good book) This is for you in support of libraries, books, words, ideas…. “No infant has the power of deciding….. by what circumstances (they) shall be surrounded.. Robert Owen".

=== Seventh sculpture ===
The seventh sculpture was found on 30 August 2011 on a bookshelf at Edinburgh Central Lending Library. It comprises a magnifying glass on a stand on top of a (real) old book. Some words on the book are also shown in the lens of the magnifying glass: "When I go in I want it bright, I want to catch whatever is there in full sight".

The note accompanying the sculpture read: "For Central Library 'A Gift' @Edinburgh_CC This is for you in support of libraries, books, words, ideas…. Libraries are expansive". The word 'expensive' has had the E crossed out and replaced with an A. The tag also notes, "Words on book – Edwin Morgan".

=== Eighth sculpture ===
The eighth sculpture was found on 23 November 2011 in the Scottish Poetry Library, where the first sculpture was found in March 2011. The staff were first alerted to its presence by a note which the sculptor had left in the guest book: "Hopefully next time I’ll be able to linger longer – I’ve left a little something for you near Women’s Anthologies X. In support of Libraries, Books, Words and Ideas…." The sculpture was found on a bookshelf. The sculpture comprised two parts: an elaborate cap made of a wing of finely cut paper feathers, and a pair of gloves with 'bumblebee' stripes.

The note accompanying the sculptures was written on both sides. It described the inspiration for the sculptures, a quote from the poem "Gifts" by Scottish poet Norman MacCaig: "To @ByLeavesWeLive....... The gifts 'Gloves of bee's fur, cap of the Wren's Wings.......' Norman McCaig .... maybe sometimes impossible things... In support of Libraries, Books, Words Ideas...." and "10/10".

A longer note accompanying the piece made clear that this sculpture was the last in a series of ten sculptures:

"It's important that a story is not too long ……does not become tedious ……. 'You need to know when to end a story,' she thought. Often a good story ends where it begins. This would mean a return to the Poetry Library. The very place where she had left the first of the ten. Back to those who had loved that little tree, and so encouraged her to try again …….and again. Some had wondered who it was, leaving these small strange objects. Some even thought it was a ‘he’! ……. As if! Others looked among Book Artists, rather good ones actually……. But they would never find her there. For though she does make things, this was the first time she had dissected books and had used them simply because they seemed fitting…. Most however chose not to know….. which was the point really. The gift, the place to sit, to look, to wonder, to dream….. of the impossible maybe……. A tiny gesture in support of the special places…. So, here, she will end this story, in a special place … A Poetry Library …. where they are well used to 'anon.' But before exiting …a few mentions. There could be more, because we have all colluded to make this work……. Just a few though.

- the twitter community who in some strange way gave rise to the idea in the first place
- @chrisdonia who gave the story a place, a shape and some great pictures
- and not least @Beathhigh whose books and reputation have been shamelessly utilised in the making of a mystery …….

…… But hold on. Someone’s left behind a pair of gloves and a cap……….? Cheers Edinburgh It’s been fun! X"

The revelation that this was the tenth sculpture caused some concern, as only eight were known of at this point. It was feared that the other two might have been lost or stolen or even simply thrown away by someone who didn't realise what they had found.

=== Ninth sculpture ===
The ninth sculpture was found on 24 November 2011 at the National Museum of Scotland, where it had been placed on the plinth under a stag skeleton. It comprised a tyrannosaurus rex bursting out of a copy of Sir Arthur Conan Doyle's The Lost World. Small human figures with weapons were amongst the shredded leaves of the book.

The note accompanying the sculpture read: "For @NtlMuseumsScot A Gift Your friends at @edbookfest suggested you might like this. …. In support of libraries, books, words, ideas and those places that house our treasures……". and "9/10".

=== Tenth sculpture ===
This sculpture was the eighth in the gift chain, but was the last to be found, on 24 November 2011. It was found at the Writers' Museum in Edinburgh, on top of the donations box in the Robert Louis Stevenson room. It comprises a moonlit street scene, and is fashioned from a copy of Ian Rankin's second Rebus novel, Hide and Seek. It bore the words "commingled out of Good and evil", which is a quote from Stevenson's Jekyll and Hyde.

The note accompanying the sculpture read: "@CuratorEMG A Gift 'The stories are in the stones' Ian Rankin In support of Libraries, Books, Words, Ideas …… and Writers." and "8/10".

=== Eleventh sculpture ===
Although the artists had said that the series comprised ten sculptures, on 25 November 2011 an eleventh was delivered to the Edinburgh Bookshop, an independent booksellers, addressed to Ian Rankin.

The sculpture comprises two skeletons sitting on a coffin lid; the open coffin is cut out of a (real) old book. The skeletons are drinking and smoking, and listening to a record on a portable record player. The record sleeve reads "The Impossible Dead/Ian Rankin/Some Secrets Never Die" and the coffin lid reads "R.I.P. 13/10/11". 13 October 2011 was the publishing date of Rankin's novel The Impossible Dead.

The note accompanying the sculpture read: "For @Beathhigh A Gift "… something in us never dies" (R. Burns 1790) In support of those who turn ideas into words, words into books …… & of course books into libraries." and "11/10".

@Beathhigh is Ian Rankin's Twitter account name.

== Reaction ==
The sculptures, and the mystery over the identity of their creator, made local, then national and international news. As of December 2012, the identity of the creator has still not been revealed.

The ten Edinburgh sculptures were brought together in December 2011 for a one night private exhibition at the Scottish Parliament.

The Edinburgh sculptures were sent on a small 'mini tour' of Scotland between 17 August and 8 December 2012, appearing at Aberdeen Central Library, Dundee Central Library, Wigtown Book Festival, Mitchell Library, Glasgow, Dunfermline Carnegie Library and the Scottish Poetry Library. In the book giftED that was published in time for the tour, the sculptor wrote that at the heart of the project was "a woman, who had been a girl, whose life would have been less rich had she been unable to wander freely into libraries, art galleries and museums. A woman who, now all grown, still wants access to these places and yes, wants them for her children...". The photographs in the book are by Chris Scott.

In July 2012 it was reported that a documentary about the sculptures, featuring Ian Rankin and Rory Bremner, is being made.

After the tour concluded the original ten sculptures were sent back to their original locations with the bespoke plinths made for the exhibition with the intention that they continue to be accessible to the public.

== 2012: Flowers ==
In August 2012 the sculptor left fifty paper flower sculptures around the site of the Edinburgh International Book Festival, each with the Oscar Wilde quote "… freedom, books, flowers and the moon" and on the reverse "A Gift For You" and a limited edition number of /50.

== 2012: Five Book Week Scotland sculptures ==
In November 2012 it was announced that the sculptor had been approached via an anonymous email account and had agreed to make five more sculptures that were to be hidden around Scotland as part of Book Week Scotland, and that the finders would be given another small sculpture as a prize. Online clues to their whereabouts were released, one a day between 26 and 30 November 2012. Each sculpture was found on the day the clue was released; the person to reach it first each day received a paper sculpture trophy in the shape of a teacup, themed on the book and reading "A winning cop and a good book - the perfect combination" on the top.

=== First sculpture ===
The first was found on 26 November 2012 at Glasgow School of Art. It is a book sculpture inspired by Alasdair Gray's classic novel Lanark: A Life in Four Books. The finder's prize was a sculpture of a small teacup with elements of the Lanark theme. The Lanark sculpture is now displayed next to the Glasgow School of Art shop during opening hours.

=== Second sculpture ===
The second sculpture was found at the Robert Burns Birthplace Museum in Alloway, and the sculpture was based on the Robert Burns poem "Tam O' Shanter" - which is set in Alloway. The finder's prize was a teacup featuring a horse's tail, a reference to the poem. The sculpture is on display at the Museum.

=== Third sculpture ===
The third sculpture was found at the Am Politician pub on the Isle of Eriskay, where the nine pupils of the Eriskay Primary School found the sculpture based on the Compton Mackenzie novel Whisky Galore. The finder's prize was a teacup with a bottle labelled 'whisky galore' on the top. The sculpture is on display at the pub.

=== Fourth sculpture ===
The fourth sculpture was found at J M Barrie's birthplace in Kirriemuir, and was based on Peter Pan. The finder's prize was a teacup with a hook-tipped spout.

=== Fifth sculpture ===
The fifth sculpture was found at the Scottish Seabird Centre, North Berwick, and was based on Robert Louis Stevenson’s Treasure Island. The finder's prize was a teacup with a palm tree on the top.

== 2012: Another gift ==
In November 2012 a third sculpture was given to the Scottish Poetry Library, with the instructions that the box in which it was held was not to be opened until 7 December 2012 - the last day of the exhibition of the original ten. Built upon a copy of Robert Louis Stevenson's poetry collection A Child's Garden of Verses it featured a girl sitting under a tree, wearing a crown and reading a book, while the facing page shows Stevenson's poem, "To My Mother".

In the tree are the words, "You in a garden green" and "With me were king and"; on the girl's crown is the word "Queen". On the trunk of the tree are the words, "Were hunter, soldier, tar" and the inside of the small book reads, "And all the thousand things that children are". Some bunting dangling from the tree read "But time, which none can bind, While flowing fast away, leaves love behind." These are all lines from Stevenson's poem, "To Willie And Henrietta".

The note accompanying the sculpture read: " .... For the Love of Books. Every ending marks a new beginning."

== 2013: Preparing to fly ==
In May 2013 a new sculpture was left in the Scottish Poetry library. This comprises three blue paper eggs in a paper nest in a cardboard birdhouse; the nest is on a platform with threads that allow it to be lifted out - the instructions that came with it say, "Nest can sit at bottom, hang midway or be outside birdbox - it's yours now!" The box has images and text on either side with gold leaf in places. The eggs are threaded together with slips of paper which read, "Preparing to start", "Sleeping in the woods" and "Life's little things"; the eggs have the words, "nest-egg", "new moon" and "great ovation" stuck to them. The tag reads simply, "Preparing to Fly 1/3 In support of libraries, words, book, ideas ........ x".

In June 2013 Leith Library received a sculpture of three baby birds in a nest, addressed both to the library itself (@leithlibrary) and to their Reader in Residence Emily Dodd (@auntyemily), only the second time one of the sculptures has been addressed to a person. Included with the book sculpture was a quote from A.A.Milne "It is more fun to talk with someone who doesn't use long, difficult words but rather short, easy words like 'what about lunch?'. In support of libraries, books, words, ideas. Preparing to Fly 2/3".

== 2014: Butterflies On The Move ==
As part of the Macmillan Art Exhibition called 'Inspired' held in Bonhams, Edinburgh, an intricate work of butterflies emerging from a book was delivered, anonymously. This book sculpture was auctioned to raise funds for this charity. It was bought by the Mackenzie family of Edinburgh, who decided to tour this 'Butterflies' sculpture on a not-for-profit basis so that a wider audience could see it. The idea was that the generosity of the artist and the story should continue to inspire others, especially youngsters and those that had not yet been able to experience the 'book sculpture library tour' in Edinburgh. The Butterflies sculpture visited the following locations: The War Poets library, Edinburgh Napier University; BBC Scotland, Pacific Quay; Killin library, Killin; John Gray Library, East Lothian; Kirkwall library, Orkney; Glasgow Museum's Resource Centre, South Nitshill, Glasgow; Abbotsford House, Borders; Crighton Library, Dumfries; Aberdeen Central Library, Aberdeen. The sculpture's tour finished in the Scottish Parliament and was commented upon by MSPs and the First Minister. A 'time for reflection' parliamentary speech was given by Dr Colin Mackenzie, thanking the artist for her generosity and inspiration.

During the tour the artist offered to collaborate with members of the public who sent in their own paper butterflies.

== Interview ==
In January 2015 the artist gave an email interview to the BBC, in which she hinted that more sculptures were to come: "What makes you think 'Butterflies' is my most recent sculpture?".

== The final curtain ==
In March 2015 the artist announced that the time had come "to draw time on the project". The last sculpture would be a collaboration with the public. A request was made for the public to make their own butterflies before 31 July 2015. These butterflies would be made into a final sculpture.

== 2016: The Butterfly Tree and Lost Child ==
The final paper sculpture was a collaboration with the general public in response to the Butterfly On The Move Tour. Butterflies flew in from all over the world and from all different age groups of contributors. The resulting sculpture was a 6'6' high tree with butterflies as 'leaves'. The tree was supported by a 'lost child'. The sculpture appeared at the Edinburgh Book Festival in August, 2016. A hand illustrated book was left with the sculpture. It tells the fictional story of the Butterfly Tree and how it reached out and comforted the Lost Child. The artist intends to remain unknown.
