= Martin Nannestad Jørgensen =

Danish textile artist

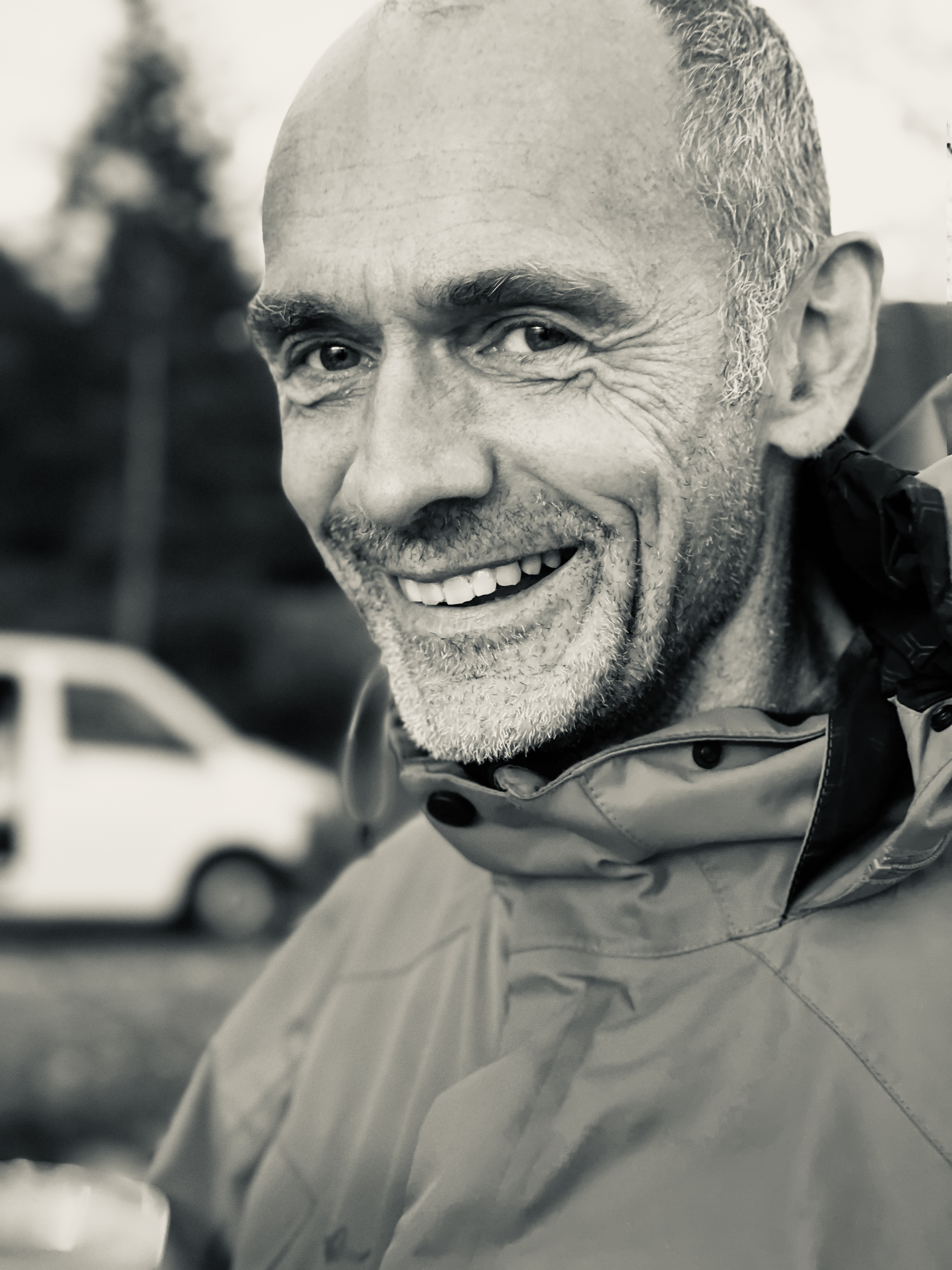
- Born: 9 June 1959 (age 66); Östhammar, Sweden
- Known for: Monumental tapestries and ecclesiastical textile
- Website: http://www.martinnannestad.dk

Martin Nannestad Jørgensen (born 9 June 1959) is a visual artist living and working in Copenhagen, Denmark. His main medium is textile.

== Biography ==
Born in Östhammar, Sweden and growing up in Denmark and Greenland, Jørgensen received his education as a weaver by Kim Naver in Copenhagen 1978–80, Dona Paula Sanches in Guatemala 1980–81, and professor Shizuko Ōshiro in Okinawa, Japan 1986–87.

== Work ==
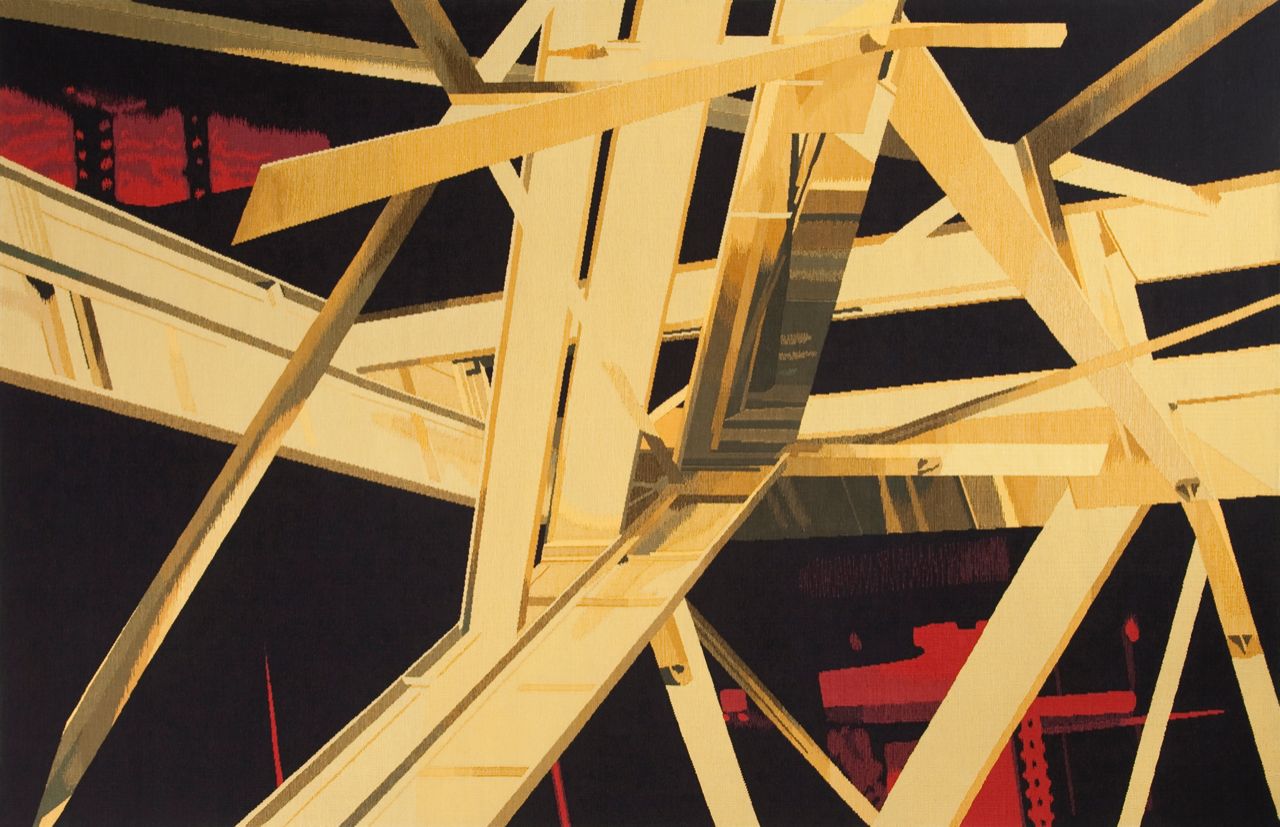
"Bewildered Yellow", 2008

=== Tapestries ===
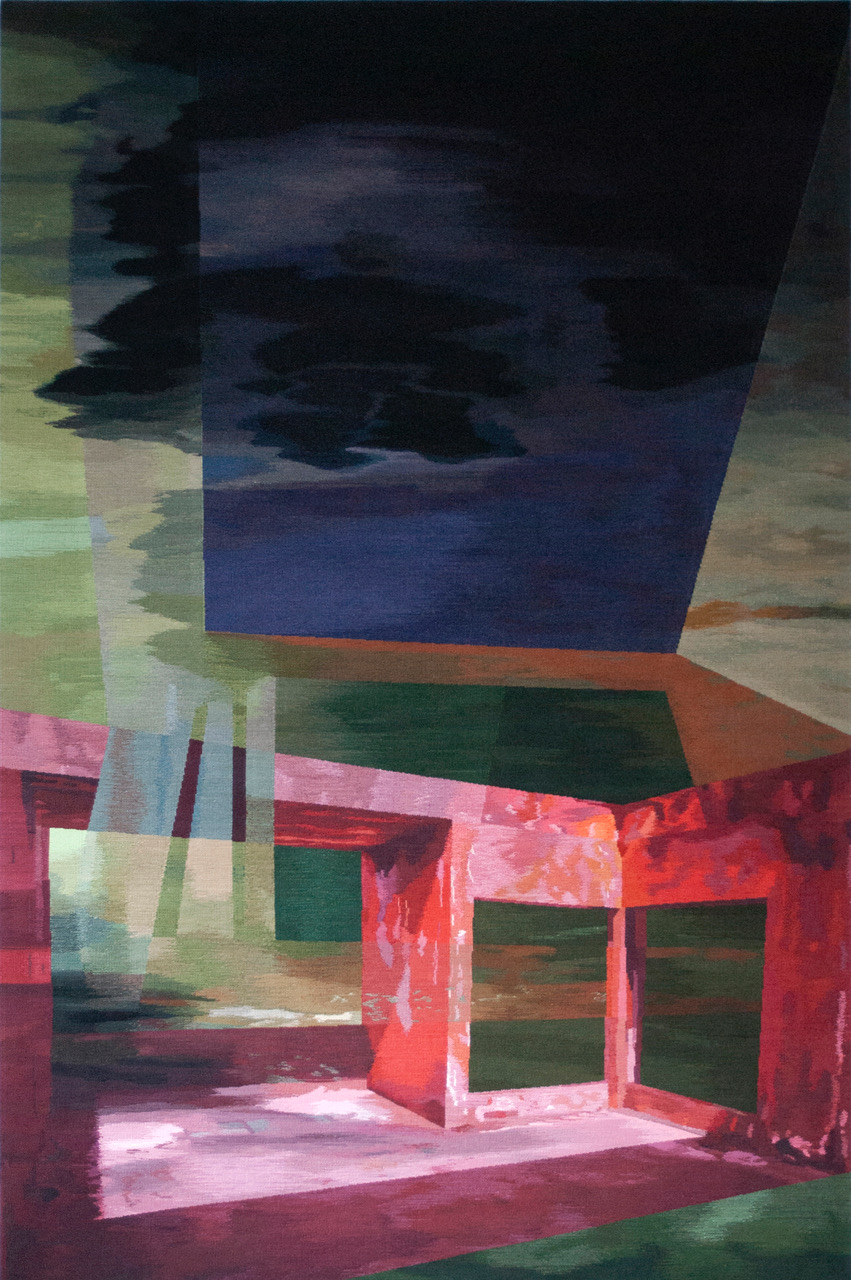
"Casino Bokor", 2014

Weilbach's Biographical Dictionary of Artists describes Jørgensen as "one of the young tapestry weavers about to revitalize a tradition that would otherwise be in danger of extinction". His commissioned works can be seen at University of Copenhagen, the Danish Ministry of Justice and the Danish Supreme Court.

=== Ecclesiastical textile ===
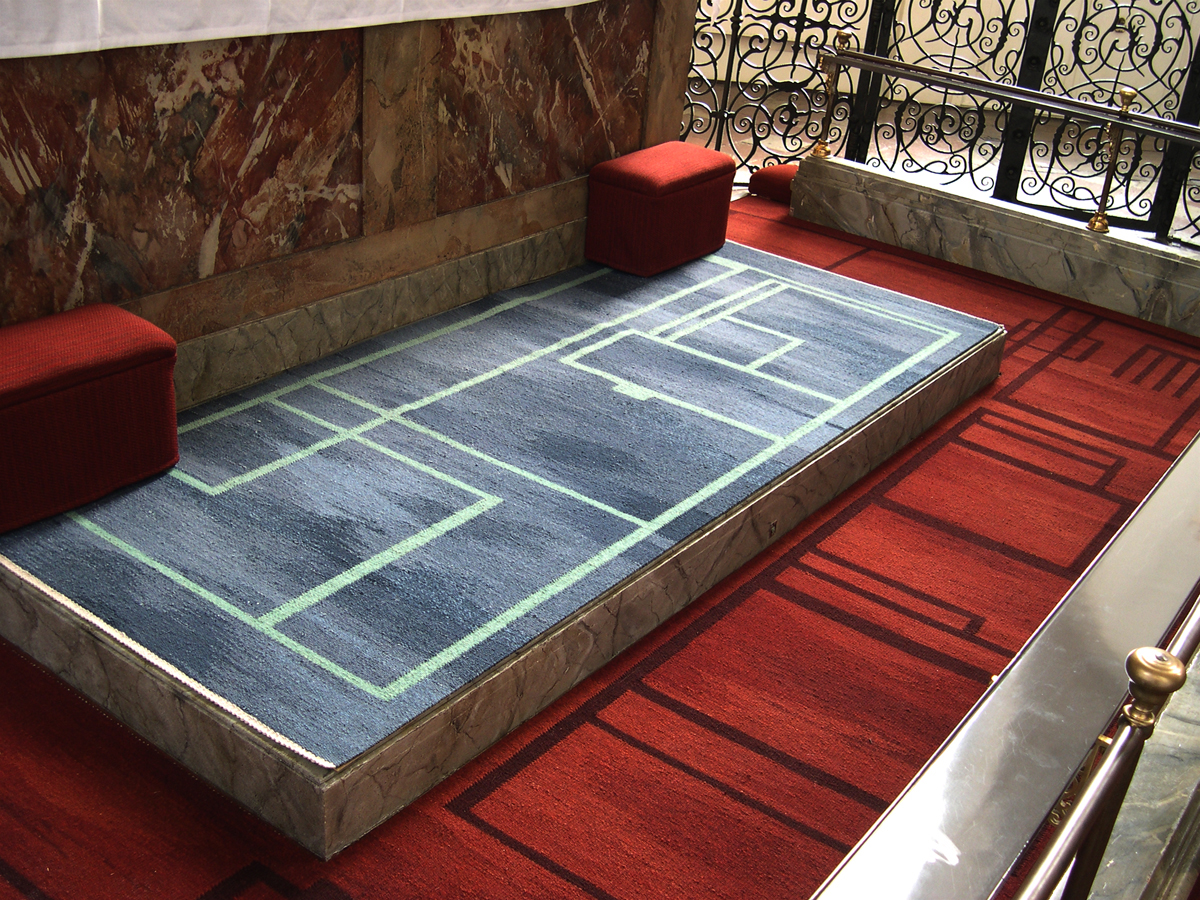
Altar Carpet in Trinitatis Church, Copenhagen, Denmark, 2005

Jørgensen has designed and produced vestments, floor coverings, and antependia for e.g. Trinitatis Church in Copenhagen, Rungsted Church, and St. Clemens' Church in Randers.

== Exhibitions ==
- 1984 Solo exhibition at the Craft Council of Copenhagen
- 1985 Charlottenborg Spring Exhibition, Copenhagen
- 1985 "Fall Exhibition", Charlottenborg Exhibition Space, Copenhagen
- 1986–1987 "Dänische Webteppiche" Hannover and Cologne, Germany
- 1987 "Danish Genuine Carpets Exhibition", Copenhagen
- 1987–1988 Danish Ministry of Culture's Travelling Exhibition in France
- 1988 "Thread in space", Danish Ministry of Culture Gallery, Copenhagen
- 1989 "The State Art Foundation 25th year anniversary exhibition", Copenhagen
- 1991 "Tapestries", group show at Munkeruphus Gallery, Dronningmølle
- 1993 Project "Blood on Ice", Thule, Greenland
- 1995 Project "Blood on Ice" continued, Thule, Greenland
- 1996 "Hand-Shake", Textile installations in Andersen's Water Tower, Copenhagen
- 1997 "Blood Show" at Bille Brahe's Outdoor Slide Gallery, Copenhagen
- 1997 "Danish Crafts and Design Exhibition", St. Petersburg, Russia
- 2001 "Remixing a Scene", video installation, Copenhagen
- 2002 "Contemplation Room", video installation, Danish Ministry of Culture Gallery, Copenhagen
- 2005 Participating with the video "Movements" in Tromanale Film Festival, Berlin
- 2005 Solo exhibition: "Art- Industry- Museum", Museum of Applied Art, Copenhagen
- 2019 Solo exhibition: Slow Art, Rundetaarn, Copenhagen
- 2021 Cordis Prize for Tapestry - Inverleith House Edinburgh, Scotland
- 2022 participating in censored exhibition Fibremen 7, Ivano-Frankivsk, Ukraine
- 2024 Solo exhibition: Slow, Danish Cultural Institute, Beijing, China
