= Lisa Kokin =

American interdisciplinary artist

Lisa Kokin is an American interdisciplinary artist known for mixed media and textile works which often include sewn elements. Kokin's work includes found objects, textiles, photography, artist's books, and installation. Her content includes history, memory, identity, and social justice.

== Early life and education ==
Kokin grew up on the East Coast. Her parents were upholsters and she sites their studio environment as influencing her work. Words about Art explains, "For Lisa Kokin, thread has always been both idea and material. Her immigrant parents were upholsterers by trade; her grandma worked in a tie factory. Kokin got her first sewing machine at nine, and soon began making her own clothes. As an artist, her work has included a substantial range of methods and materials, but thread itself has connected most of the parts of her career: used to stitch together disassembled books, old photographs, buttons, zippers; to create both words and images and—most recently—to transform thousands of shreds and tiny cut fragments of paper money into works of art."

Kokin's education includes a BFA and MFA from California College of the Arts.

== Career ==
Lisa Kokin's earliest works are political/social justice posters. Many of these are in the Oakland Museum of Art collection and date from 1973 to 1990.

Kokin is cited as being professionally active as a book and textile artist since 1991.

In a 2009 review of Lisa Kokin: Ex Libro, a solo exhibition at Donna Seager Gallery in San Rafael, California, Barbara Morris writes, "Kokin is, ultimately, irreverent, inventive and funny as hell. With bushels full of Jewish guilt, she tackles postmodern challenges of authorship and authenticity, reinventing the wester novel, pop psychology and Dr. Seuss as her own unique creations while considering weighty issues of censorship and discrimination, generation and gender, as well as displaying her subtle finesse with color, texture and poetic content."

Spoken Vision writes about Kokin's altered books, "Beyond what words can describe, Kokin’s works contain messages that transcend the artwork’s origin. Her works do not just construct the written words, they deconstruct the words again."

Natalie Zdrieu writes that Kokin's work is, "about memory and history, many using stitching techniques on items which are not normally sewn."

In a Square Cylinder review David M. Roth claims of Kokin that she, "provides potent, poignant metaphors for the cycle of life" and that the works "all evince an obsessive quality." He continues, saying of the work, "It appears delicate, but its underlying strength is what sticks in memory."

Maria Porges states, " Her sense of humor, evident in the aforementioned titles, exploits various kinds of plays on words or historical references, all of which help to lay a trail of breadcrumbs regarding possible interpretations."

Her work has been featured in Art made from books : altered, sculpted, carved, transformed, Lenscratch, Flow Magazine, and Make among others.

== Awards ==
- Alameda County Arts Commission
- California Arts Council Individual Artist’s Fellowship
- Eureka Fellowship from the Fleishhacker Foundation
- WESTAF/NEA Regional Fellowship
- Dorothy Saxe Invitational Award for Creativity in Contemporary Arts
- Richmond Civic Center Public Art Interior Acquisitions Project

== Exhibitions ==
- Stitched, Lesher Center for the Arts, Walnut Creek, California, 2024
- Lisa Kokin: Textile, Gail Severn Gallery, Ketchum, Idaho, 2022
- Tikkun: For the Cosmos, the Community, and Ourselves, Contemporary Jewish Museum, 2022
- Lisa Kokin: Lucre, Donna Seager Fine Arts, 2018
- From Generation to Generation: Inherited Memory and Contemporary Art, Contemporary Jewish Museum, 2016–2017
- Lisa Kokin: Loss for Words, Gail Severn Gallery,Ketchum, Idaho, 2016
- Lisa Kokin: Facsimile, Donna Seager Gallery, 2014
- Raveling: Lisa Kokin, Donna Seager Gallery, 2012
- Do Not Destroy: Art and Jewish Thought, The Dorothy Saxe Invitation, Contemporary Jewish Museum, San Francisco, California, 2012
- Lisa Kokin: Ex Libro, Donna Seager Gallery, 2009

== Collections ==
- Bainbridge Island Museum of Art, Cynthia Sears Artists' Book Collection
- Boise Art Museum
- Oakland Museum of California
- Buchenwald Memorial (Germany)
- di Rosa Preserve
- Mills College
- Yale University Art Museum
- University of Washington
- Rutgers University
- Kaiser Permanente
- Tiffany & Co
