= Suzanne Lee =

American fashion designer

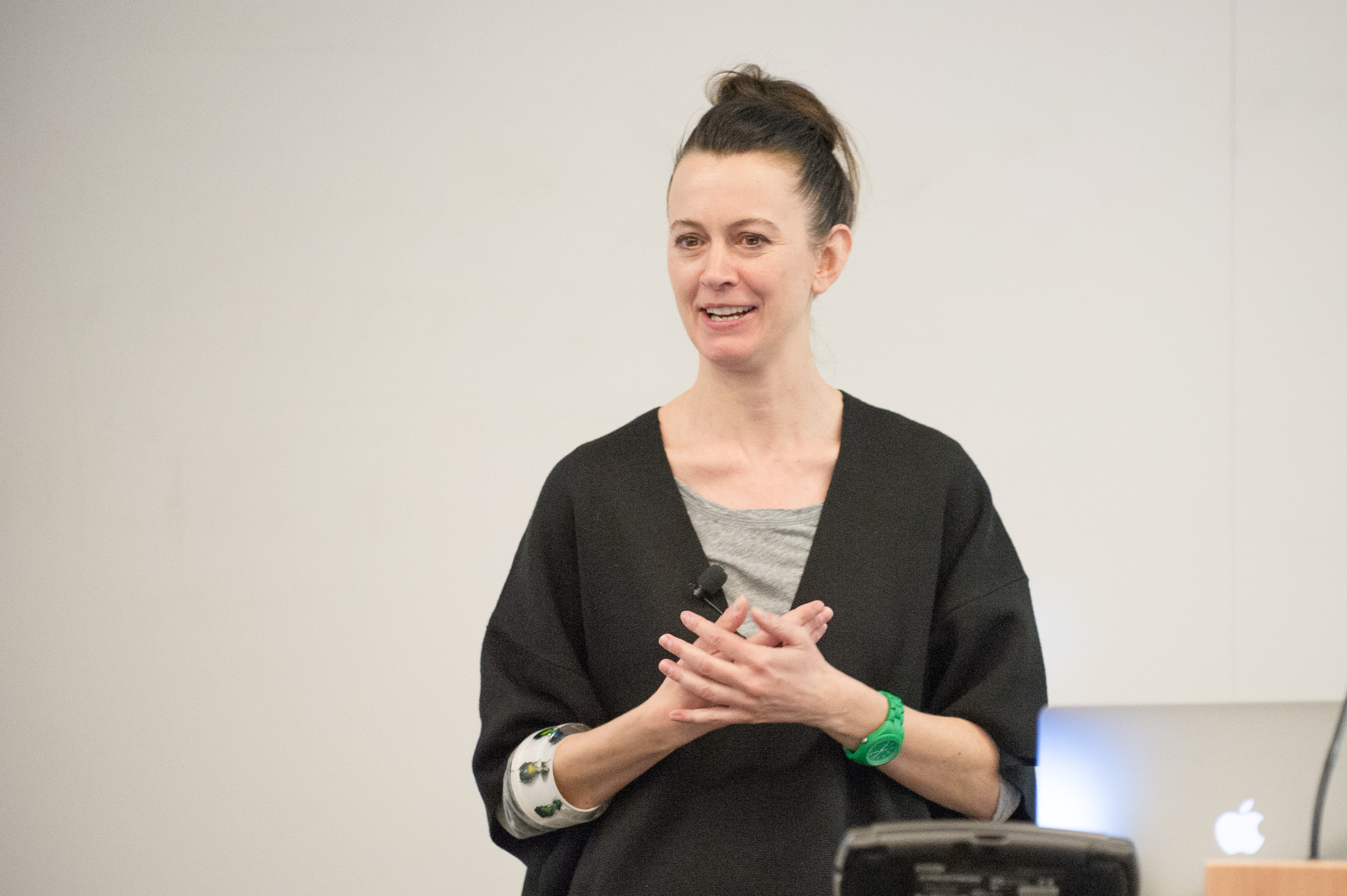
Suzanne Lee in 2014

Suzanne Lee (born 1970) is a Brooklyn, New York based fashion designer working on fashion and future technologies.

She is a Senior Research Fellow at Central Saint Martins College of Art and Design, the Director of The BioCouture Research Project, and Chief Creative Officer at Modern Meadow.

Her recent Arts and Humanities Research Council (AHRC) funded project BioCouture looks at ecological and sustainability issues surrounding fashion. She is working with scientists to engineer optimized organisms for growing future consumer products.

In 2007 she published Fashioning the Future: Tomorrow's Wardrobe. The book examines the work of the scientific researchers and fashion designers, such as Issey Miyake, Hussein Chalayan, and Walter Van Beirendonck, who are transforming today's science fiction into tomorrow's reality.

== BioCouture ==
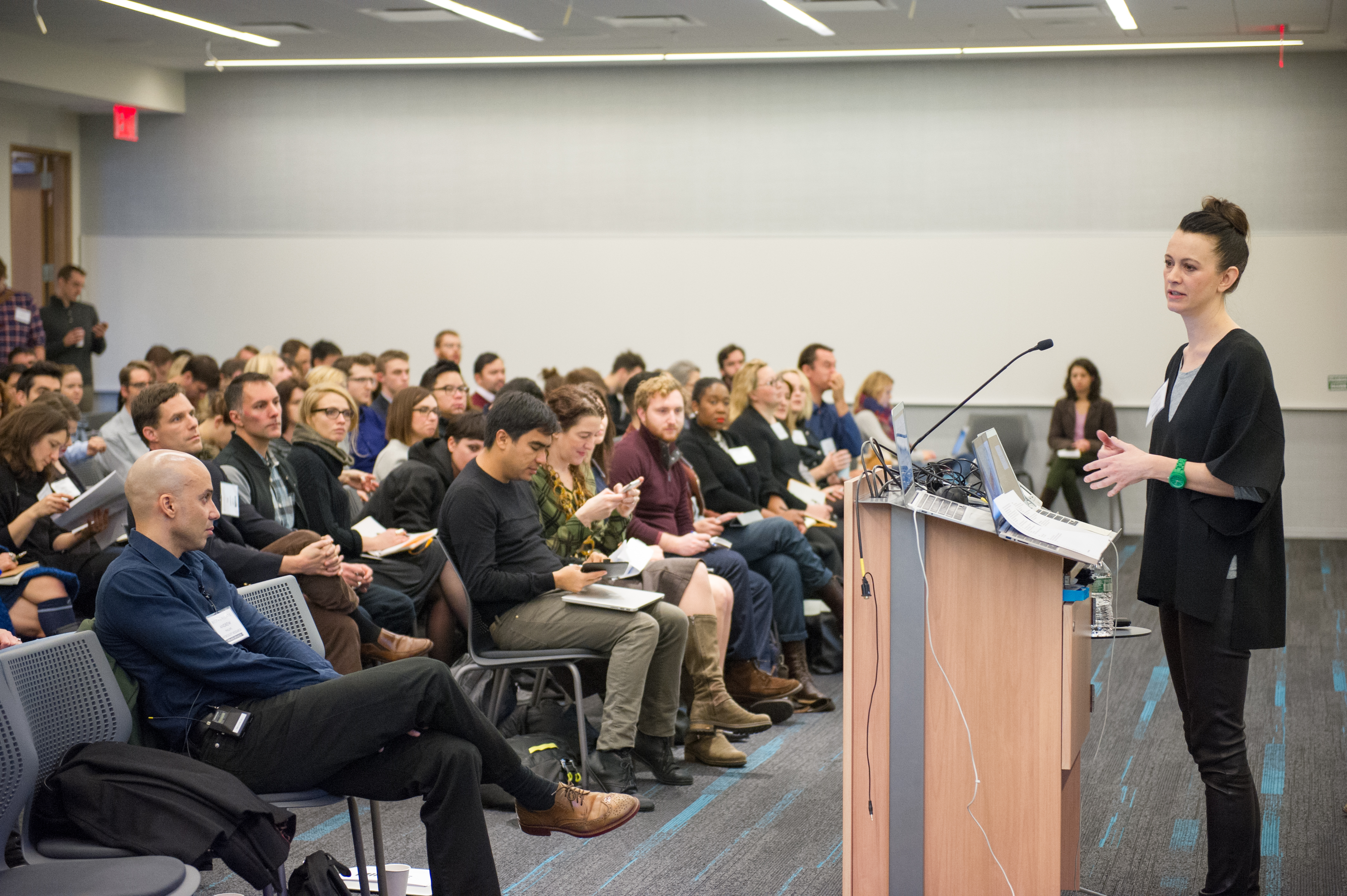
Lee at the 2014 BioCouture conference

BioCouture is a research project using nature to suggest an innovative future fashion vision. Lee uses microbial cellulose (composed of millions of tiny bacteria grown in bathtubs of sweet green tea) to produce clothing. The idea is to grow a dress in a vat of liquid.

The project used a kombucha culture, which from feeding bacteria with sugar creates cellulose fibers, which naturally self-assemble to form a non-woven sheet material.

After 20 years, Lee is now advising startups that are copying the Biocouture process and getting funded. BioCouture has been included in Time magazine's annual roundup of The Top 50 Best Inventions of 2010.

== BioFabricate ==
Lee founded BioFabricate in 2014 to work at the intersection of design, biology and sustainability. They host the annual conference BioFabricate Summit where businesses that biotechnology to develop material, fashion and clothing present work.

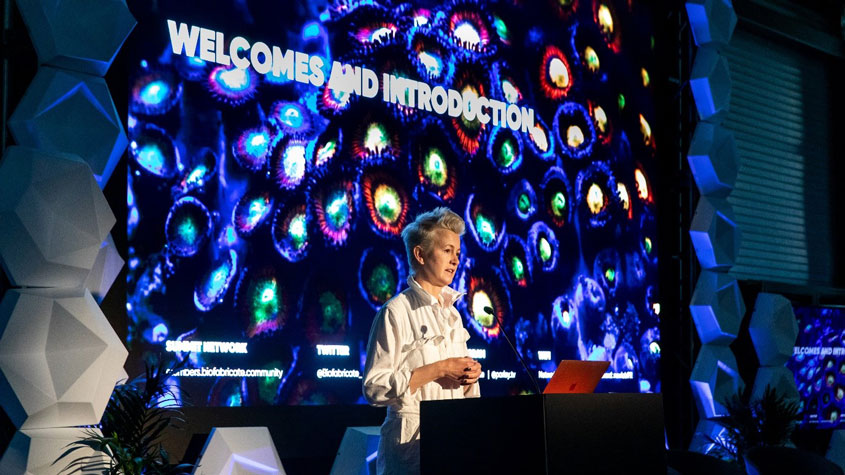
Biofabricate CEO Suzanne Lee at the 2022 edition of the Biofabricate Summit in New York.

In an interview with WIPO Magazine, Suzanne Lee explained that biofabrication involves utilizing microorganisms to create materials and ingredients for human use, such as fuel, food, and fibers. Lee envisions these organisms as the cell factories of the future, providing high-value ingredients without depleting precious land resources: "The ultimate goal is to bring individuals together to use biomaterials for consumer goods and grow the sector."

Biofabricate's current activities include building an educational platform for brands to learn about biomaterials, creating a reference book for creative professionals, and collaborating with global brands on their biomaterial innovation strategies.
