= List of Inspector Rebus characters =

This is a list of characters from the Inspector Rebus series of detective novels by the Scottish writer Ian Rankin. They are all fictional characters that have appeared in more than one novel in the series. A number of the characters appeared in the television adaptations made for ITV.

== Police ==
=== Detective Inspector John Rebus ===
Detective Inspector John Rebus is the protagonist in the Inspector Rebus series. He was born in 1947 in Fife and left school at the age of fifteen to join the Army. After serving in Northern Ireland he applied to undergo selection for the SAS, but after a horrendous ordeal in training, left the army and joined Lothian and Borders Police.

He is initially introduced as a Detective Sergeant, and is promoted to Detective Inspector early in the series.

=== Detective Sergeant Siobhan Clarke ===
Detective Sergeant Siobhan "Shiv" Clarke is Rebus's trusted friend and partner. Her given name is represented in IPA /ʃɨˈvɔːn/. In the 2000 television series, Clarke was first played by Gayanne Potter and then by Claire Price. In the 2024 reboot, she is played by Lucie Shorthouse.

Clarke hails from a middle-class English family (her parents are politically active on the left) and is much younger than Rebus. She has a university degree and is a devoted follower of Hibernian F.C. As a woman, she faces obstacles to acceptance in the police force, especially since, like Rebus, she enjoys the challenges of solving cases rather than administrative work or networking. At the same time, she is Rebus' foil; in contrast to his hands-on approach to policing, Clarke strictly follows procedure.

The relationship between Clarke and Rebus is emotional; she is his apprentice but also something of a daughter figure, and there is, during the middle years, some romantic charge in the relationship as well. She first appears in The Black Book (1993) as a newly promoted Detective Constable. She remains a useful sidekick of Rebus until Set in Darkness (2000), when she becomes a secondary protagonist with chapters devoted to her cases and perspective. She is promoted to Detective Sergeant by the beginning of Resurrection Men (2002) and to Detective Inspector after Exit Music (2007). As a DI in the later novels, after Rebus's first retirement, she provides him with access to cases, and eventually she, Rebus, and Malcolm Fox become a pseudo "team". In Saints of the Shadow Bible (2013), Rebus rejoins the police as a DS and she is his superior. In A Song for the Dark Times (2020) she is the one who helps Rebus move downstairs to his new ground floor flat.

She is more willing and able than Rebus to incorporate technology into her work, and in The Falls (2001) she pursues a killer through an email correspondence while Rebus explores historical parallels. She is also more cautious than he about violating policies and procedures, and provides a voice of reason.

Like Rebus, she is "married to the job". Most of the men romantically interested in her (or she in them) are policemen. At one point, in Resurrection Men, she has three suitors but prefers the one who is willing to settle for a platonic relationship; later, she and Malcolm Fox have a similarly platonic relationship. In the later books, she has an affair with divorced colleague DCI Graham Sutherland.

=== Detective Chief Superintendent Gill Templer ===
Detective Chief Superintendent Gill Templer is a regular character in Rebus series up through A Question of Blood (2003). She first appears in Knots and Crosses as a Detective Inspector and Press Liaison; she and Rebus have an affair. In the two subsequent novels, he is still in love with her but their relationship is on-and-off-again; it ends definitively when he chooses to move in with Patience Aitken in Strip Jack (1992). Templer is ambitious and networks with other women who are pushing the boundaries in their professions. She is promoted to Detective Chief Inspector in Let it Bleed and thus becomes Rebus's boss at St. Leonard's police station. She becomes the first female Detective Chief Superintendent just before The Falls. In that novel, she tries to mentor DC Siobhan Clarke. She also plays Cupid to Rebus and Jean Burchill.

=== Assistant Chief Constable Colin Carswell ===
Assistant Chief Constable Colin Carswell is the chief officer with overall responsibility for crime in Lothian and Borders Police. He first appears in Black and Blue (1997), nicknamed "The CC Rider". He reappears as ACC Colin Carswell in Dead Souls (1999), but his description has changed. He continues in that role through The Falls (2001). He and Rebus disapprove of each other.

=== Detective Chief Superintendent Thomas "Farmer" Watson ===
Detective Chief Superintendent Thomas Watson, nicknamed "The Farmer" is a senior detective, Rebus's superior, from Hide and Seek (1991) until the first chapter of The Falls (2001), where he retires. He also appears in some of the short stories in A Good Hanging. In most of these novels, he is charge of the CID based at St Leonard's, Edinburgh police station. Occasionally we get a brief glimpse of his point of view on Rebus. Although he is exasperated by Rebus's tendency to ignore his requests and even orders, he appreciates that Rebus gets results.

=== Detective Chief Inspector Bill Pryde ===
Detective Chief Inspector Bill Pryde is the Chief Inspector at St Leonard's CID before its closure. He is introduced as a Detective Inspector and is promoted prior to Resurrection Men.

=== Detective Chief Inspector James Macrae ===
Detective Chief Inspector James Macrae is the head of CID at Gayfield Square police station in Edinburgh when Rebus and Clarke are stationed there after the closure of St Leonard's, that is, in Fleshmarket Close, The Naming of the Dead, and Exit Music (2004-2007). He does not like or trust Rebus, not even giving him a desk in the CID room at first, and suspending him three days before retirement in Exit Music. He has a favoured DI, Derek Starr, who does what he wants, but he also likes DS Clarke.

=== Detective Chief Inspector James Page ===
Detective Chief Inspector James Page is in charge of the Gayfield Square CID during the period of Rebus's retirement (starting with Standing in Another Man's Grave, 2012). Because the station was not designed with an office for the DCI, he has repurposed a closet as his office. At first, he and DI Siobhan Clarke seem to have some romantic history, but it is not mentioned in later novels. He is a well-organised, cheerful manager of the team, and loves the limelight and networking with his superiors, which disgusts Rebus. When Rebus serves as a DS at Gayfield Square in Saints of the Shadow Bible, DCI Page does not appreciate him and kicks him out of the station.

=== Detective Chief Inspector Graham Sutherland ===
DCI Graham Sutherland first appears in In a House of Lies in charge of the Major Incident Team; he includes DI Siobhan Clarke in his group. He is "early fifties maybe", lives in Glasgow, but has been stationed in various locations around the country. By the end of that book, the two are clearly good friends, and by the next book, A Song for the Dark Times, they are lovers; she recalls that he has asked her to move in with him, but she is doubtful. He is divorced but signs of his ex-wife linger at his home, and she doubts he has bothered to buy a new bed.

=== Chief Inspector Lauderdale ===
Chief Inspector Frank Lauderdale ("Fart" Lauderdale) is described as Rebus's senior officer so presumably a Detective Chief Inspector, and as a "bigot". He appears in the novels from Strip Jack (1992) to Let it Bleed (1996), at the beginning of which he crashes the car in which he and Rebus are pursuing two young criminals; he survives but is badly hurt. He also appears in some of the stories in A Good Hanging. Rebus winds him up whenever he can and calls him "the Clockwork Orangeman" behind his back. Once when Rebus replied "Right you are, sir" Lauderdale sat in a daze: "He'd said it! Rebus had actually ended a sentence with 'sir'!"

=== Detective Inspector George Flight ===
Detective Inspector George Flight of the London Metropolitan Police is in charge of the serial killer case in Tooth and Nail (1992). Rebus is sent to assist him and the two men become friends. Rebus consults him by phone in the next book, Strip Jack, where Flight remarks that Rebus persuaded him not to retire. He is also on a phone call with Rebus in the short story "Seeing Things" from A Good Hanging and Other Stories (1992).

=== Detective Inspector Abernethy ===
Detective Inspector Abernethy is a representative of the Special Branch (Metropolitan Police). He involves himself in two of Rebus's cases. In Mortal Causes (1994) he is interested in the relationships between Irish and Scottish paramilitary groups, and gun-running. In The Hanging Garden (1998) he tells Rebus that it is not in the national interest for Rebus to succeed in his efforts to persuade Mr. Lintz to talk about his activities as a Nazi.

=== Detective Inspector Alister Flower ===
Detective Inspector Alister Flower is based at St Leonard's, Edinburgh police station in three novels, starting with The Black Book (1993). He hates Rebus, his fellow DI, because he sees him as competition. In Let it Bleed (1995), Rebus has been offered a promotion to DCI, but in Galashiels, by higher-ups who want him out of Edinburgh. After Rebus has caught Flower in several nasty activities, Flower helps Rebus in exchange for the promotion.

=== Detective Inspector Claverhouse ===
Detective Inspector Claverhouse is a Detective Sergeant, then Detective Inspector, based at the Lothian and Borders Police headquarters at Fettes as part of the Scottish Crime Squad. He works in partnership with DC/DS Ormiston and is nicknamed "Bloody Claverhouse". He is tall and thin with sandy hair, and fond of country and western music. He and Ormiston first appear in Mortal Causes (1994), and again in The Hanging Garden (1998) and Resurrection Men (2002), at which point the Crime Squad is evolving into Scottish Crime and Drug Enforcement Agency.

=== Detective Inspector "Shug" Davidson ===
Detective Inspector "Shug" Davidson is a police officer based at Torphichen Place (West End) police station in Edinburgh. He appears in Let it Bleed (1996), Dead Souls (1999), Fleshmarket Close (2004), and Exit Music (2007). He and Rebus respect each other and he is often helpful to Rebus.

=== Detective Inspector Bobby Hogan ===
Detective Inspector Bobby Hogan is a police officer based at Leith police station. He appears in most of the novels from The Hanging Garden (1998) to A Question of Blood (2003). He is an intelligent cop and he and Rebus enjoy working together.

=== Inspector Malcolm Fox ===
Inspector Malcolm Fox is the main protagonist in the Inspector Malcolm Fox series, The Complaints (2009) and The Impossible Dead (2011), where he is an Inspector with the Lothian and Borders Complaints and Conduct (or Professional Standards) Department. In the Rebus series, starting with Saints of the Shadow Bible, (2014), he is an important point-of-view character. He is described as a bear of a man; despite this imposing physicality, his early stint in CID (including time working with John Rebus) was not a success. His brief marriage ended in divorce, after which he decided to stop drinking completely. He pays to keep his father in a nursing home until, in Even Dogs in the Wild, the old man dies; he also does his best to support his sister Jude, who is an alcoholic, a gambling addict, and full of spite.

In Standing in Another Man's Grave (2013) he is a distant antagonist, suspicious of John Rebus. However, in Saints of the Shadow Bible he needs Rebus's help on an investigation, and they develop a rapport; he also meets and admires Siobhan Clarke, and the three of them become a kind of team. In Rather Be the Devil (2016) and subsequent novels, he has been transferred to the Scottish Crime Campus at Gartcosh, but he is given assignments in Edinburgh when the Gartcosh chiefs need to be involved in a case, and then he rejoins Rebus and Clarke on their investigations. He gradually gains confidence in the field as well as in rooms full of case files. In A Song for the Dark Times, he and 'Big Ger' Cafferty manipulate each other in the way Cafferty and Rebus often do.

He and Clarke establish a platonic relationship in Even Dogs in the Wild but it is spoiled when he is promoted to Gartcosh instead of her (and also when he allows her to be investigated for a leak to the media for which he is himself responsible). He also has a brief fling with DS Tess Leighton, between In a House of Lies and A Song for the Dark Times.

He also appears (based in Gartcosh) in A Heart Full of Headstones.

In Midnight and Blue, Fox resigned due to the 'utter fucking fannies' in the police hierarchy.

=== Detective Inspector Derek Linford ===
Detective Inspector Derek Linford is a police officer based at the Lothian and Borders Police headquarters at Fettes. He appears in Set in Darkness, The Falls, and Resurrection Men (2000-2002), though he has a significant role only in the first of these. He is ambitious and sure of his own moral high ground, qualities which do not endear him to Rebus. He takes Siobhan Clarke out on a date, but when she is no longer interested he spies on her. He is an acolyte of ACC Colin Carswell.

=== Detective Inspector Jack Morton ===
Detective Inspector Jack Morton is a police officer who appears Knots and Crosses, the first Rebus novel (1987), as a friend of Rebus; they are both Detective Sergeants, and have to do a lot of legwork together. Rebus re-establishes their friendship during Black and Blue (1997( when he meets him during an investigation. Morton helps him give up alcohol and paint his apartment. Afterward, though Morton returns to Falkirk, he acts as sponsor for Rebus, talking him through his temptations to drink. Rebus invites him onto an undercover operation in The Hanging Garden (1998) in which Morton is shot in the chest and killed. He becomes one of the "ghosts" Rebus drinks to forget.

=== Detective Inspector Stefan Gilmour ===
Detective Inspector Stefan Gilmour appears in Saints of the Shadow Bible (2013) and the related short story, "Dead and Buried". He was in charge of a CID team at Summerhall police station in the early to mid-80s, when Rebus was posted there as a Detective Constable. When the violence and corruption of the Summerhall team was close to exposure, he resigned his post to shut down the inquiry. In Saints he has become a prominent builder of hotels and a proponent of the "No" vote in the 2014 Scottish independence referendum.

=== Detective Sergeant Brian Holmes ===
Detective Sergeant Brian Holmes is a police officer who is a trusted, though often mystified, subordinate of Rebus in the early novels and short stories. His point of view on Rebus is sometimes presented. He first appears in the novel Hide and Seek (1991) as a DC with a girlfriend, Nell Stapleton, who is a librarian at the University of Edinburgh. He is Rebus's friend and closest associate in Strip Jack (1992) through Black and Blue (1997), as well as in many of the short stories published during these years. He is torn by the choice between Rebus's obsessive style of policing and the more domestic life Nell wants. Finally he chooses to leave the police. To some extent his function as Rebus's sounding-board is replaced by Siobhan Clarke.

=== Detective Sergeant Ormiston ===
Detective Sergeant Ormiston is a police officer based at the Lothian and Borders Police headquarters at Fettes as part of the Scottish Crime Squad. He works in partnership with DI Claverhouse. He has greasy black hair.

=== Detective Sergeant Eric Bain ===
Detective Sergeant Eric Bain ("Brains") is a police officer and computer expert based at the Lothian and Borders Police headquarters at Fettes, who appears in three novels. He provides tech support to Siobhan Clarke during The Falls (2001) and in Resurrection Men (2002) they have what seems to be a good friendship, visiting each other and sharing their interests. However, when Eric wants to take this into romantic territory, Siobhan withdraws. In The Naming of the Dead Eric turns up again, living with the gorgeous Molly; both characters twist into the plot.

=== Detective Sergeant Ellen Wylie ===
Detective Sergeant Ellen Wylie is a police officer at Torphichen station. She first appears in Set in Darkness (2000) as part of a team from various Edinburgh police departments assigned to assess security at the as-yet-unbuilt Scottish Parliament. She and DC Grant Hood together work on assignments from Rebus; her point of view is occasionally included in the narrative. In The Falls (2001) she has a crisis when DCI Templer appoints her as Press Liaison and she is not able to handle a difficult presentation; Rebus uses her on his case but she resents the whole situation. She is active in Fleshmarket Close (2004), where Rebus is investigating a case in Torphichen territory. In The Naming of the Dead (2006), she is again assisting Rebus; she is now living with her sister, who has escaped an abusive husband.

=== Detective Sergeant Tess Leighton ===
Detective Sergeant Tess Leighton is part of the Major Incident Team headed by Detective Chief Inspector Graham Sutherland in In a House of Lies and A Song for the Dark Times. She is tall, slim, pale, intelligent, and interested in men. She and Malcolm Fox have a few dates. Her colleagues on this team in the two books include DS George Gamble and DC Phil Yeats.

=== Detective Constable Robert Burns ===
Detective Constable Robert Burns ("Rab") appears in The Black Book (where he is a Detective Sergeant), Mortal Causes and Let it Bleed, always stationed at Torphichen (West End). He is a member of the Free Church of Scotland (the "Wee Frees") and preaches damnation on The Mound on Sundays. In Mortal Causes, he is a native of the Pilmuir housing estate and helps Rebus with his foray into this dangerous area, full of young thugs. In the other books, he is generally helpful.

=== Detective Constable Grant Hood ===
Detective Constable Grant Hood is a police officer who was based at St Leonards. He is a big fan of new technology and gadgets. During The Falls he is attracted to Siobhan Clarke, and attempts to kiss her. During the same novel he takes on a media liaison role, a position he takes up in a number of subsequent investigations.

=== Detective Constable "Hi-Ho" Silvers ===
Detective Constable George "Hi-Ho" Silvers is a police officer who was based at St Leonards. He is described as "coasting towards his pension".

=== Detective Sergeant Christine Esson ===
Detective Sergeant Christine Esson is part of the Gayfield Square police station CID starting with Saints of the Shadow Bible (2013). She is a social media expert. Rebus thinks she looks like Audrey Hepburn (In a House of Lies, Chapter 25). She works with databases and, when cold cases necessitate it, archives, researching leads not only for DI Siobhan Clarke but also for Rebus, who may or may not have any official status at Gayfield. She was paired with another detective, Ronnie Ogilvie.

In Midnight and Blue she clashes with Rebus and Fox when investigating a prison murder. She now works with DI Jason Mulgrew.

Esson dislikes tea and coffee, preferring to drink hot water.

=== Police Constable Toni Jackson ===
Police Constable Toni Jackson is a police officer who is based at St Leonards. She frequently encourages Siobhan Clarke to socialise with the other female officers.

== Police associates ==
=== Professor Gates ===
Professor "Sandy" Gates is a forensic pathologist who appears frequently in the Rebus series between 1996 and 2006. He and Dr. Curt are the usual medical examiners who dissect the bodies of victims. In 2013's Saints of the Shadow Bible (Chapter 13) we hear that he has been dead for some years.

=== Doctor Curt ===
Doctor Curt is a forensic pathologist and medical examiner who appears frequently in the Rebus series, beginning in 1992 with Strip Jack and ending with The Naming of the Dead (2006). He is junior to the formidable Sandy Gates, although both men are eminent figures in their profession. His fearless sense of humour is a precision instrument.

=== Professor Deborah Quant ===
Professor Deborah Quant is a forensic pathologist, medical examiner, and professor who appears in the Rebus novels starting with Saints of the Shadow Bible (2013). She also features, below, in the list of Rebus's personal relationships.

=== Haj Atwal ===
Haj Atwal is a scene of crime manager who first appeared in Rather Be The Devil (2016). He is impatient with anyone who fails to follow protocol at his crime scenes.

== Other associates ==
=== Jim Stevens ===
Jim Stevens is a journalist hostile to Rebus. He first appears in Knots and Crosses (1987), where he is a strong point-of view character as he pursues a story about Rebus's spectacular corruption; when this thesis fails him, he moves to London. Rankin featured him in his 1988 spy novel, Watchman, a non-Rebus book. Stevens returns to the Rebus series in full force in Dead Souls (1999), where he tries to write a book about a serial killer and becomes his subject's victim.

=== Matthew Vanderhyde ===
Professor Matthew Vanderhyde is a retired professor and, supposedly, warlock. He is blind, but has not always been so, and he is a font of Edinburgh history. Rebus meets him in Hide and Seek (1991) when Rebus is investigating an apparently occult murder scene. He appears in The Black Book, where he focuses Rebus on the Central Hotel fire five years earlier, and in Mortal Causes, where he is a source of information about Sword and Shield, a pro-Scottish independence group of the past. In The Hanging Garden he is in the background, and he is mentioned as being still alive in Set in Darkness (2000). In The Falls (2001) there is mention of Victorian witchcraft and modern Wicca, but Rebus does not consult Vanderhyde, which suggests he has died.

=== Mairie Henderson ===
Mairie Henderson first appears in The Black Book (1993) as a "hungry" young newspaper reporter—not only for stories, but for food; Rebus frequently treats her to a meal. She gives him information from the newspaper's archives, and he gives her leads on cases he is working on. The relationship continues through Dead Souls (1999), where she refuses to help Rebus destroy the life of an ex-con. Mairie returns in The Naming of the Dead (2006), having published a successful book on 'Big Ger' Cafferty, presenting him as a romantic figure, a reformed gangster; he, however, gets all the profits from the book. She helps Rebus investigate arms deals in that book. She is also mentioned in Exit Music (2007).

=== Steve Holly ===
Steve Holly is a scurrilous Glasgow-based reporter who appears in The Falls (2001), A Question of Blood (2003), and Fleshmarket Close (2004). His goal is to find the most sensational aspect of a story.

=== Laura Smith ===
Laura Smith is the crime reporter for The Scotsman, beginning in Saints of the Shadow Bible (2013). She is a friend of DI Siobhan Clarke.

As of Midnight and Blue she has resigned from newspapers and become a podcaster. She clashes with Clarke when reporting on child abuse cases which Clarke had not wished to be publicly known.

== Criminals ==
=== Morris Gerald "Big Ger" Cafferty ===
Morris Gerald Cafferty ("Big Ger") is a notorious Edinburgh crime boss and a frequent antagonist throughout the Rebus series. Although he has a brief cameo in the third novel Tooth and Nail, he first appears as a main character in The Black Book. Physically intimidating, as well as being ruthless and manipulative, he is one of Scotland's most powerful gangsters. He controls an organisation that can apply intimidation, coercion, bribery, and murder to achieve his goals, but he is quite willing to wield these tools personally.

Cafferty was born on 18 October 1946 and by the 1980s he had become the controlling crime boss of Edinburgh. His relationship with Rebus ranges from outright hostility to an uneasy partnership. Cafferty habitually mocks Rebus by calling him 'Strawman', a nickname based on a court officer's error in calling Rebus to testify at a trial. The two men are about the same age and are sometimes described as looking like brothers, as they get older. As a result of their relationship, Rebus is often accused of being 'in Cafferty's pocket'.

At the end of The Black Book (1993), Rebus is able to arrest him on ample evidence. Cafferty is sent to HM Prison Barlinnie, whose warden falls under his control. In Mortal Causes (1994), Cafferty's son is murdered; Cafferty, in prison, helps Rebus find the killer, and then breaks out (temporarily) to exact revenge. During Cafferty's incarceration, Rebus keeps returning to Cafferty for assistance, which Cafferty either provides, refuses, or disguises with misdirection, usually dropping an inadvertent clue or two. For example, he assigns the Weasel to help Rebus locate the driver who hit Rebus's daughter in The Hanging Garden (1998). In Set in Darkness (2000), Cafferty engineers a curtailment of his prison term on compassionate grounds (he has faked having cancer), and Rebus is horrified to find him singing Robert Burns in public. Cafferty, however, suggests that he will henceforward be a respectable real-estate tycoon instead of a gangster.

In later novels, Cafferty is a near-permanent figure, claiming to have gone straight while retaining criminal control of Edinburgh from behind the scenes. He is often linked to cases that Rebus and Clarke are investigating, but there is never enough evidence to bring charges against him.

In Exit Music (2007), an impending move to arrest, convict, and disempower Cafferty is forestalled when he is assaulted and hospitalised, comatose. On the final page, his heart flatlines and Rebus desperately tries to revive him, lest Cafferty have a 'cold, cleansed death'. The book ends without revealing the results of Rebus's resuscitation attempt. In the next Rebus novel, Standing in Another Man's Grave (2012), we discover that Cafferty survived, though he seems somewhat subdued and stripped of power.

In Rather Be the Devil (2016), however, Cafferty seizes control of a string of Edinburgh bars and betting-shops, and he continues to thrive in In a House of Lies (2018). He also a leading character in A Song for the Dark Times (2020) and (in a wheelchair) in A Heart Full of Headstones (2022). In Midnight and Blue (2024), Big Ger is dead, as Rebus had tried to frighten him by putting a pillow over his head and was convicted of his manslaughter.

=== The Weasel ===
The Weasel is Cafferty's second in command, who represents him in Edinburgh while he is in HM Prison Barlinnie. Cafferty informs Rebus that the Weasel's surname is Jeffries. He gained the nickname from Rebus for looking like a weasel. His shabby appearance disguises his important role in Cafferty's organisation. In The Hanging Garden, the Weasel finds the juvenile joyrider who knocked down Sammy Rebus, and is ready to facilitate Rebus's revenge on him; Rebus, however, is horrified when he realises his great enemy is only a child. In Resurrection Men, Claverhouse and Ormiston plan to blackmail the Weasel into giving them Cafferty. This involves the Weasel's son, who had been running drugs behind Cafferty's back, and a huge stash of drugs meant to bait a trap. The plan goes badly awry, with Cafferty triumphing. The careers of Claverhouse and ACC Colin Carswell are devastated. Cafferty tells Rebus that the Weasel is history, implying that his intended betrayal was discovered and he was killed.

=== Darryl Christie ===
Darryl Christie is a young Edinburgh gangster who appears in the later Rebus novels. He is the teenage brother of a serial killer's victim in Standing in Another Man's Grave (2012), but he has a plan to take over the business of his mother's lover, a gangster. When he accomplishes this, he and Cafferty agree to respect each other. In Saints of the Shadow Bible (2013) he trades favours with Rebus, and in Even Dogs in the Wild (2014) he saves Fox's life. However, in Rather be the Devil (2015) he has overextended his empire; Cafferty, wanting to get power back, engineers serious trouble for him. Darryl kills a man for the first time, in self-defence, and then madly wants to shoot Cafferty and a swindler colleague; Rebus arrests him, and Cafferty takes over his businesses.

As of Midnight and Blue (2024), Christie is still in prison and trying to control his empire from behind bars, though he is being challenged by other gangsters.

== Rebus's personal life ==
=== Rhona ===
Rhona is Rebus's ex-wife. When she married him, she was divorced. She teaches English in school. She appears primarily in three novels: she is part of Rebus's background in the first novel, Knots and Crosses (1987); in Tooth and Nail (1992) Rebus visits her and Sammy in London; and in The Hanging Garden (1998) she comes to Edinburgh to sit by Sammy's bedside after the latter's accident (bringing her current partner with her). In A Song for the Dark Times (2020), we read that "Rhona had died a few years back" (chapter 2), perhaps before her granddaughter Carrie was born.

In Set in Darkness (2000) Rebus recalls how strongly Rhona supported Scottish independence in the 1979 Scottish devolution referendum, and he maps the failure of their relationship against the transition from arguing actively about it to silent provocation and finally his own failure to vote at all.

=== Sammy ===
Samantha "Sammy" Rebus is the only child of Rebus and Rhona, born around 1975 (since she is "nearly twelve" in 1987's Knots and Crosses). She progresses from a child to an adult over the course of the series. In Knots and Crosses she is kidnapped by a serial killer with a personal vendetta against her father. After this traumatic experience, Rhona moves with her to London, where Rebus catches up with them in Tooth and Nail (1992) and discourages an ill-chosen boyfriend. In Let it Bleed (1996), Samantha moves back to Edinburgh and is under the wing of Patience Aitkin, her father's ex; she is working for a group that helps prisoners, a career choice that is hostile to her father's. At the end of this novel, she and her father show some tenderness for each other.

In The Hanging Garden (1998), she is living with a journalist, Ned Farlowe, but she is hospitalised after a hit-and-run, and in a coma for most of the book, reuniting her parents, Patience, and Michael Rebus at her bedside. In Dead Souls (1999) she is in a wheelchair but working hard at physical therapy in the expectation of being able to walk; she is still living with Ned Farlowe.

Otherwise, until Rebus's retirement in 2007, she remains a shadowy figure, someone now distant he thinks he ought to call. In Standing in Another Man's Grave (2012) Rebus makes the effort to visit her home near Tongue, Highland, but no-one is home; when he phones her afterward, she explains that her partner Keith Grant has a good job dismantling a nuclear plant and that they are trying for a second time to conceive via IVF. This is evidently successful, and in Even Dogs in the Wild (2015) Rebus visits her and her daughter Carrie, who is two; he also recalls holding a newborn Carrie. In A Song for the Dark Times (2020), Samantha is distraught when Keith goes missing; Rebus arrives to investigate what turns out to be a murder in which Sam is the obvious suspect.

=== Carrie ===
Carrie is the granddaughter of John Rebus, born around 2013 to Samantha and Keith Grant who was murdered; see A Song for the Dark Times (2020). Carrie was conceived by IVF - a final throw of the dice. She is growing up in a small town in the far north of Scotland.

=== Michael ===
Michael Rebus ("Mickey") is John's younger brother, who followed their father's career as a stage hypnotist. Although he and John look alike, their personalities are very different. Michael has a faithful wife (Chrissie), children, and a nice car. He is an important character in Knots and Crosses (1987), where he is picking up money dealing drugs and eventually goes to prison for it; he also hypnotises John, allowing him to access traumatic memories of his SAS "training" to solve a case and also to resolve his undiagnosed PTSD. In The Black Book (1993) Michael turns up after doing his prison time and crashes at John's apartment, even though it has been rented to students. Although he seems carefree, doing drugs and sleeping with one of the students, he is reading up on therapeutic hypnosis and seems ready to make a career change; at the end of the book, he is going back to his family. Michael shows up at Samantha's bedside in The Hanging Garden (1998), and he is often mentioned in succeeding books as someone Rebus thinks he should get in touch with. The Naming of the Dead (2006) opens with his funeral, and Rebus's difficulty in mourning his brother is an underlying current in that novel.

=== Patience Aitken ===
Doctor Patience Aitken, a general practitioner, is a romantic partner for Rebus beginning with Strip Jack (1992). He decides to move in with her and rent out his own apartment, but in The Black Book (1993) she is fed up with his inability to schedule any time for her, and she kicks him out. In Mortal Causes (1994) he is back living at her flat. In the following novel, Let it Bleed (1995), Rebus's daughter Samantha is the one living with Patience, and he must be invited to visit them; neither woman is comfortable with him. He shuts Patience's cat, with which he has always had an uneasy relationship, out of the house, where it is attacked and killed.

=== Jean Burchill ===
Jean Burchill, a museum curator, meets Rebus in The Falls (2001), where she assists him with his investigation and is imperiled by it. They immediately hit it off and start a relationship. By the time of the next novel, Resurrection Men, Rebus is struggling to maintain the relationship, and in the subsequent novel A Question of Blood (2003), the romance is close to ending. However, when Deborah Quant first meets Rebus in Saints of the Shadow Bible (2013), she pointedly asks him whether he still visits the museum where Jean works.

=== Deborah Quant ===
Deborah Quant, a medical examiner and university professor, first appears in Saints of the Shadow Bible (2013), where she is described from Rebus's point of view as having red hair and blue eyes and being in her mid-forties, but with no wedding ring (chapter 22). They flirt a little, and by the last page of the novel Rebus has a date with her. They are known to be going out during Even Dogs in the Wild. Rather Be the Devil opens and closes with Rebus and Quant having dinner out; she has given him the gift of a diseased lung in a jar of formaldehyde to help him stop smoking. In the Prologue to A Song for the Dark Times (2020) she defines the relationship as "friends with benefits". See above under "Police Associates".

=== Brillo ===
In Even Dogs in the Wild there is a small dog, a wire-haired terrier, astray in Cafferty's neighborhood. After several visits there, Rebus takes the dog home and, finding that no-one else wants a dog, adopts it. During its time boarding with a vet it acquired the name Brillo.

=== Father Leary ===
Father Conor Leary is an elderly, intellectual Catholic priest and a friend of Rebus. They meet in The Black Book (1993) when Rebus, on impulse, enters a confessional; he later goes to Mass hoping to see the priest who had spoken to him. In Mortal Causes (1994) it is clear that they have had many conversations over a Guinness, and Leary asks Rebus to pay attention to the Catholic youth center in Pilmuir, propelling him into a major plot thread. In The Hanging Garden (1998) Father Leary is taking a lot of medicine, and in Dead Souls (1999) Rebus visits him in the hospital. In The Falls (2001) Conor Leary suffers a brain haemorrhage while attending a surgeons' dinner and dies instantly, falling over a railing.
