= Exit Music =

Crime novel by Ian Rankin

- First edition
- Author: Ian Rankin
- Language: English
- Series: Inspector Rebus
- Genre: Detective novel
- Publisher: Orion Books
- Publication date: 6 September 2007
- Publication place: Scotland
- Media type: Print
- Pages: 496
- ISBN: 978-0-7528-6860-8
- OCLC: 122283613
- Preceded by: The Naming of the Dead
- Followed by: Standing in Another Man's Grave

Exit Music is the seventeenth crime novel in the Inspector Rebus series, written by Ian Rankin and published in 2007 by Orion Books.

The title comes from the Radiohead song "Exit Music (For a Film)".

== Plot summary ==
The narrative takes place between November 15th and 27th, 2006, with Rebus's last day in the Edinburgh CID being November 25. Rebus and Siobhan Clarke are investigating the death of a famous Russian poet, found beaten to death on King's Stables Road. Soon afterwards, a sound recordist with close ties to the dead Russian poet dies at home in an arson fire. Rebus discovers that the dead poet had taken his last meal with the recordist, then had had a drink with Morris Gerald Cafferty, Rebus's gangster nemesis, in a bar where Cafferty was meeting a Russian oligarch and a Labour official from the Scottish Parliament. Rebus finds Cafferty's hand in many schemes (drugs, abusive landlord practices), but the biggest ones involve real estate and are quite legitimate.

Meanwhile DS Siobhan Clarke, on the cusp of promotion to DI and given charge of the case, tries to find her own way, both dreading and looking forward to losing her mentor. She takes on a protégé of her own, a street cop from a family involved with petty crime, Todd Goodyear.

Rebus is suspended for insulting a powerful Scottish banker in the presence of the Chief Constable. He continues to pursue his hunches, however, often with Clarke's collusion. At one point he meets Cafferty alone; Cafferty is attacked immediately afterwards, and Rebus is carefully framed for it. On his last day on the job, however, Rebus succeeds in disentangling his suspicions and identifies the killers of the poet and the sound recordist. It takes him a little longer to discover who framed him for the attack on Cafferty.

== Place in the Rebus novels ==
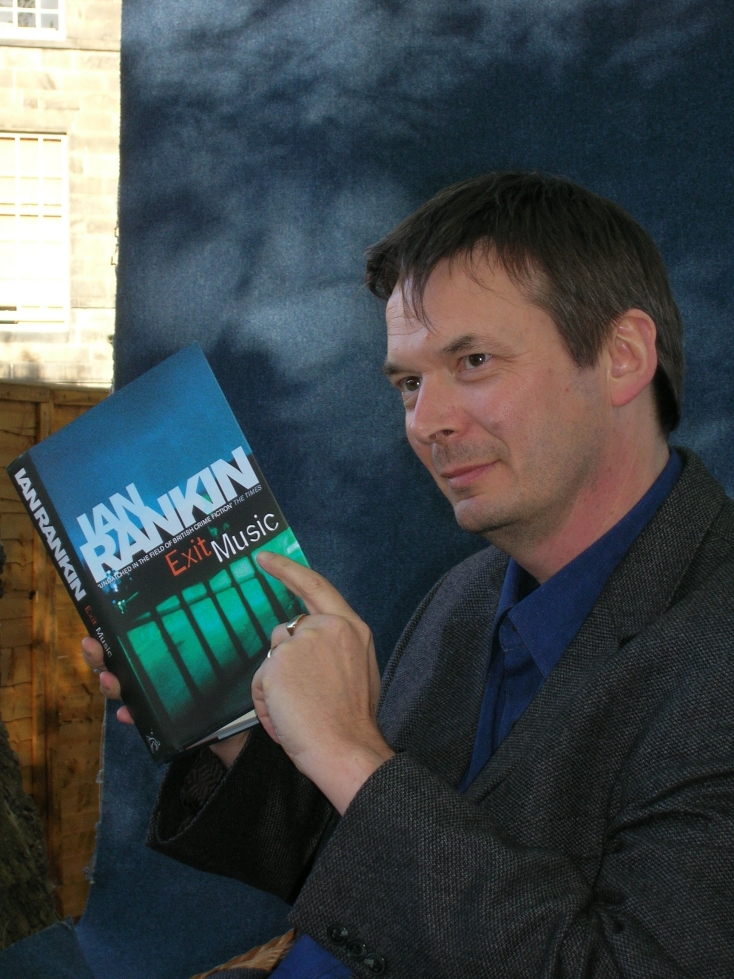
Ian Rankin announces the title at the Edinburgh International Book Festival.

Exit Music includes Rebus's retirement at the age of 60. Rankin had been anticipating this event at least since 2000, when he commented in an interview that Rebus "lives in real time; he was 38 in Knots & Crosses and he's 52 now. He'll have to retire at 55." Rebus in fact postponed retirement until age 60 (November 2006), clinging to his job, although in the two previous books (Fleshmarket Close and The Naming of the Dead) he thought frequently about his upcoming retirement. Rankin appeared ambivalent about whether the book series would end with Rebus’s retirement; in a video clip, he says Exit Music "may be the final book" and offers two possible endings: Rebus being kissed by (presumably) Siobhan Clarke, or Rebus stabbed mortally by a dying Cafferty. The book’s actual ending is more ambivalent, a kind of anti-Reichenbach Falls in which Rebus resuscitates a dying Cafferty.

Rankin did not publish another Rebus novel for five years; he continued to write about Edinburgh’s police, but with a new protagonist, Malcolm Fox, in two novels, The Complaints (2009) and The Impossible Dead (2011), before bringing Rebus back as a co-protagonist with Fox in Standing in Another Man's Grave (2012).

The character of Malcolm Fox, who is assigned to “the Complaints” or Internal Affairs investigating police corruption, is well-prepared for in Exit Music. Todd Goodyear, Siobhan’s enthusiastic disciple, provides both Rebus and Clarke with food for thought about how the police has changed since Rebus joined (and also since Clarke joined). Rebus began his career in a world where even good policemen lied on the witness stand to protect each other or, as in the Spaven case described in Black and Blue, to frame a likely culprit. To some extent, his maverick attitude has allowed him to steer clear of such situations and make his own moral decisions. On the other hand, many people (including Cafferty himself) assume that he is Cafferty’s tool. While Siobhan is very aware of the potential for corruption, she could never be part of the “brotherhood” and, with the advent of a more educated police force, the concept of “us against them” is foreign to her. Laura Severin comments,

[Siobhan’s] definition of herself is pragmatic rather than heroic and therefore not dependent on whether Cafferty lives or dies. This last scene [of Exit Music] illustrates that Rebus has an investment in a patriarchy structured around evil and good, while Clarke … is already an inhabitant of a postpatriarchal world more alert to social, cultural and political complexities.

Fox will be pragmatic rather than heroic, and as an investigator even more outside the brotherhood of police detectives than Siobhan, as a woman officer.

== Reception ==
- ITV3 Crime Thriller Award for Author of the Year, 2008 (awarded to Ian Rankin).
