= Tooth and Nail (novel) =

1992 novel by Ian Rankin

- 1st edition (under original title)
- Author: Ian Rankin
- Original title: Wolfman
- Language: English
- Genre: Detective fiction
- Published: 1992
- Publisher: Century
- Publication place: Scotland
- Media type: Print
- Pages: 304 pages
- ISBN: 0-7528-7727-5
- OCLC: 60513004
- Preceded by: Hide and Seek
- Followed by: Strip Jack

Tooth and Nail is a 1992 crime novel by Ian Rankin, originally entitled Wolfman. It is the third of the Inspector Rebus novels.

It also exists as an audiobook, narrated by James MacPherson.

== Plot summary ==
Rebus is drafted in by the Metropolitan Police to help track down a cannibalistic serial killer called the Wolfman, whose first victim was found in the East End of London's lonely Wolf Street. His London colleague, George Flight, is not happy at what he sees as interference, and Rebus, who is also struggling with a family issue involving his teenage daughter, encounters prejudice as well as the usual dangers of trying to catch a vicious killer.

When Rebus is offered a psychological profile of the Wolfman by an attractive woman, it seems too good an opportunity to miss.

== Connections to other Rankin books ==
- Journalist Jim Stevens from Knots and Crosses and non-Rebus book Watchman makes a cameo appearance, again basing off his status quo in Watchman.
- Rebus remembers the line "There are clues everywhere" at one point, a reference to the taunting messages he receives in Knots and Crosses.
- Rebus briefly thinks "don't talk to me about Hyde", a reference to the events of Hide and Seek.
- 'Big Ger' Cafferty makes his first appearance, in the background as a gangster Rebus has to give evidence against.

== Writing Tooth and Nail ==
In the Exile on Princes Street foreword to Rebus: The Early Years, Rankin says he was living in London at the time of writing and didn't enjoy it, so "I brought Rebus to London so he could suffer, too". The original title was Wolfman but Rankin's American edition editor came up with the title Tooth and Nail, which Rankin "liked better" as it kept the early title sequence ([something] & [something]) going.
