= The Complaints =

2009 crime novel by Ian Rankin

- First edition
- Author: Ian Rankin
- Language: English
- Genre: Detective novel
- Publisher: Orion Books
- Publication date: 3 September 2009
- Publication place: Scotland
- Media type: Print (hardback & paperback)
- Pages: 381 pp
- ISBN: 0-7528-8951-6
- Followed by: The Impossible Dead

The Complaints is a novel by Scottish crime writer Ian Rankin. It was published in the United Kingdom on 3 September 2009.

== Plot outline ==
Detective Inspector Malcolm Fox works in the Complaints and Conduct Department of Lothian and Borders Police, members of which are invariably treated with suspicion and hostility by regular police officers. Fox and his team are tasked with investigating Detective Sergeant Jamie Breck, suspected of being a member of a child pornography ring. However, Breck is in turn investigating the death of Vince Faulkner, who was in an abusive relationship with Fox's sister. This brings Fox into direct contact with Breck, and as he develops both a friendship and a working relationship with him he begins to doubt the validity of his assignment. Despite his personal connection to the case, and against protocol, Fox gets involved in the investigation into Faulkner's death. This brings him into conflict with Breck's superior officer, who harbours a dislike of Fox for investigating a corrupt officer under his command.

Eventually, Fox and Breck are both suspended and Fox himself is placed under investigation. However, they continue to investigate Faulkner's death, discovering that he had links to a bankrupt property developer who appears to have committed suicide. This leads to further links to members of the criminal underworld, and in turn to a senior member of the police force, who is found to be responsible for having Breck framed and for having Fox placed under investigation.

== Structure and relationship to the Rebus novels ==
The action of The Complaints takes place on February 3–24, 2009, with the days specified by the book's sections. Dividing a larger number of chapters into groupings under the date and day of the week is a practice Rankin used in the two previous Rebus novels, The Naming of the Dead (July 1–9, 2005, the week of the real-life G8 Summit in Edinburgh) and Exit Music (November 15–27, 2006, roughly Rebus's last week before his retirement). In the case of The Complaints, the dates place the action at a moment when the effects of the Great Recession of 2007-2008 are impacting Scottish banking, real estate, and underworld activities.

As in the Rebus novels, Rankin offers a temporally precise topography of the city of Edinburgh, including in this case the disruption of traffic by the construction of the Edinburgh Trams. He refers to Edinburgh's real-life police stations and districts by name, and the officers by their correct titles and ranks, providing continuity with Rebus's world.

The office of Complaints and Conduct is a presence in the Rebus novels, with Rebus himself investigated by a Complaints officer, Mullen, in A Question of Blood. However, Mullen does not appear in The Complaints, nor does any other named character from the Rebus novels. Notably, the benign DI Shug Davidson of Exit Music has been replaced at Torphichen (West End) station by the egregious "Bad Billy" Giles, and the elderly Jack Broughton operates in the Edinburgh underworld without reference to "Big Ger" Cafferty, who dominates that world in the Rebus novels. Although Siobhan Clarke, at the end of Exit Music, implies that a treacherous constable will be turned over to the Complaints, Rankin does not take the opportunity to establish continuity with the Rebus novels by mentioning the case.

The only possible reference to John Rebus is Fox's recollection that "One cop he'd known had been offered a promotion to pastures new but had asked for it to be offered to a rival. Why? To move the bastard on...." In Let it Bleed (1996), Rebus asks that a promotion offered to him (at a station far from Edinburgh) be given instead to DI Alister Flower, a problematic member of the CID at St. Leonard's, Edinburgh police station.
