= Mortal Causes =

1994 novel by Ian Rankin

- First edition
- Author: Ian Rankin
- Language: English
- Series: Inspector Rebus
- Genre: Detective fiction
- Publisher: Orion Books
- Publication date: 1994
- Publication place: Scotland
- Media type: Print (hardback & paperback)
- Pages: 336 pp
- ISBN: 1-85797-938-9
- OCLC: 60513002
- Preceded by: The Black Book
- Followed by: Let It Bleed

Mortal Causes is a 1994 novel by Ian Rankin. It is the sixth of the Inspector Rebus novels. It was the fourth episode in the Rebus television series starring John Hannah, airing in 2004.

It also exists as an audiobook, narrated by James MacPherson.

== Plot summary ==
Set during the Edinburgh Festival, this novel starts with a brutally executed corpse being discovered in Mary King's Close, an ancient subterranean street. The body has a tattoo of "SaS", later found to refer to 'Sword and Shield', a long-thought-defunct Scottish Nationalist group with links to sectarianism in Northern Ireland. The victim turns out to be the son of notorious gangster 'Big Ger' Cafferty, and the plot moves towards the unthinkable prospect of a terrorist atrocity in a tourist-filled Edinburgh. Much of the action takes place on the fictional Garibaldi or 'Gar-B' estate in the also-fictional suburb of Pilmuir.

The first murder is realised immediately to have been carried out by a "high velocity" "9mm revolver", despite 9mm being a rare calibre in revolvers, and "high velocity" not being an appropriate or immediately-recognisable description. The forensic ballistic report identifies the weapon as a rare Smith & Wesson 547. Although Rebus is repeatedly described as being ex-Army and having passed SAS selection, he does not comment on any of the unusual aspects.

== Connections to other Rankin books ==
- Scottish Sword and Shield was first mentioned in passing in The Black Book.
- Recurring character 'The Weasel' makes his debut.

== TV adaptation ==
The TV adaptation placed this as the fourth episode, after The Hanging Garden. This changed the power dynamic between Rebus and Cafferty, as Rebus was now in debt to Cafferty for an earlier favour.

== Writing Mortal Causes ==
Rankin explains the origin of the title in an Author’s Note at the outset, saying that in Scottish slang, “mortal” can mean “drunk.”

Rankin has stated that one of the minor characters is based on the Northern Irish loyalist paramilitary Billy Wright.

== Political background ==
The political background of the plot depicts an alliance between Scottish nationalist fringe groups and loyalist paramilitaries who believe they're being 'sold out' in the peace deal with the IRA. While there is significant support for loyalist paramilitarism in Scotland, radical Scottish nationalist fringe groups are far more likely to support the Irish Republican cause and to see the Republic of Ireland as a partial role model for an independent Scotland.

However, the background also makes a point of showing how the Northern Irish paramilitaries have turned to regular organised crime and are willing to cut deals with each other with money, and much of the scheming is based around criminal deals - the attempted terrorist in the book has no political aims.

== The joke ==
Throughout the book, Rebus keeps overhearing parts of a joke about a squid with a moustache that goes into a restaurant. According to Ian Rankin, the punch line is as follows: "For Hans that does dishes can be as soft as Gervase with mild, green, hairy-lipped squid."

The punch line is a reference to the long-running advertising slogan of Fairy Liquid. ("Now hands that do dishes can feel soft as your face, with mild green Fairy Liquid.")

== Reception ==
The novel was well-received, with critics commenting positively on Rankin's portrayal of "the two faces of Edinburgh": Publishers Weekly called it "powerful and absorbing".
