= Set in Darkness =

2000 crime novel by Ian Rankin

- First edition
- Author: Ian Rankin
- Language: English
- Series: Inspector Rebus
- Genre: Detective novel
- Publisher: Orion Books
- Publication date: 2000
- Publication place: Scotland
- Media type: Print (hardback & paperback)
- Pages: 415 pp
- ISBN: 0-7528-2129-6
- OCLC: 60611212
- Preceded by: Dead Souls
- Followed by: The Falls

Set in Darkness is a 2000 crime novel by Ian Rankin. It is the eleventh of the Inspector Rebus novels. It won the 2005 Grand Prix du Roman Policier (France) under the title Du fond des ténèbres.

== Plot summary ==
In 1999 the Scottish Parliament was about to reopen in Edinburgh after 300 years. The novel is set in December 1998, with considerable references to the early months of 1979, when an earlier referendum instituting a Scottish Parliament had failed to receive enough votes. In the novel's presentation of both periods (1978–79 and 1998–99), real estate and construction in Edinburgh is booming, with gangsters speculating on choice areas near the proposed new institution.

Detective Inspector John Rebus is on a committee for security liaison with the new institution, along with detectives from various Edinburgh stations. While on a tour of Queensberry House, which is to be incorporated into the new Parliament, the committee members open up an ancient fireplace and find a mummified murder victim. Investigating this case involves delving into the renovations of the building around 1979, when the victim was killed.

A Labour candidate for MSP called Roddy Grieve is found murdered on the Queensberry House grounds. Grieve is a member of a wealthy and artistic Edinburgh family, including an artist mother, a brother who is a Tory MP, a sister who was a famous model when Rebus was young, and a brother who disappeared in 1979. Grieve's murder is an important case, and it is assigned to DI Derek Linford, an earnest younger man with ambition and prospects; however, Rebus prefers his own methods.

Meanwhile, DC Siobhan Clarke, coming off a difficult stint with Sex Crimes, witnesses a suicide and becomes the investigating officer on that case. The suicide was a homeless man who had no history before 1980 but a great deal of money in the bank. As she and Rebus exchange information on their investigations, they find intersections that help them solve, or at least bring to a head, both the long-ago murder and the Grieve case.

'Big Ger' Cafferty, the mobster whom Rebus had sent to prison, now appears in the city, released because he is supposedly dying of cancer. Rebus tries to learn more about the intertwining of the local mobs and real estate in the late 70s from Cafferty, but also uncovers the cancer scam and resolves to put him behind bars again.

== Structure ==
The novel is set in December 1998, ending on Jan. 1, 1999. All the action takes place in the runup to the 1999 Scottish Parliament election.

The novel is divided into three parts, with a general epigraph of the last two lines from the poem “The Old Astronomer to His Pupil,” by Sarah Williams (set, in the epigraph, as a quatrain); this epigraph provides the book's title, and the optimistic hope that “my soul will rise in light.” The three parts are entitled “The Sense of an Ending” (ch. 1–15), “Fitful and Dark” (ch. 16–28) and “Beyond This Mist” (ch. 29–42). The first and third parts have epigraphs (Part 1 from Deacon Blue’s song “Wages Day,” and Part 3 from a poem by Angus Calder); the title of Part 2 is taken from a poem by Hugh MacDiarmid which Rebus quotes to himself in chapter 1.

Ian Rankin noted in an interview that he had originally planned this novel as the first part of a trilogy following Roddy Grieve through his career in the new Scottish Parliament; however, he almost immediately decided to kill Roddy off early in the novel and produce only a “one-book trilogy.” The rich and leisurely description of the Grieve family in chapter 3 may reflect the earlier plan to make Roddy a multi-book character.

== Place in the Rebus Novels ==
In an interview at the time of publication, Rankin noted that Rebus was approaching retirement age, “So I reckon I've got another five or six Rebus books, max.” Rebus retires in Exit Music, the sixth Rebus book on from Set in Darkness, though in fact the series has continued after his retirement. However, two changes in Set in Darkness seem to prepare for this event.

One change, which seems to set up The Final Problem for Rebus, is the emergence of Morris Gerald Cafferty from Barlinnie Prison, where he has been since 1993's The Black Book. While Cafferty will not be Rebus's main antagonist in every novel from now on, he will remain important until Exit Music and beyond. His role in Set in Darkness led one reviewer at the time to speculate “that in a few - preferably a good few - novels' time, a convulsive final secret will see [Rebus] and Cafferty locked together, disappearing over some Caledonian equivalent of the Reichenbach Falls.”

Another change is the expansion of the role of Siobhan Clarke in Set in Darkness and subsequent Rebus books. Developing another police detective character would allow Rankin to continue to write about Rebus's world after Rebus's retirement, though from a different perspective. Up to this point in the novels, Clarke has been a sidekick for Rebus — not much more than a “plucky girl assistant.” However, in Set in Darkness she is the sole or primary point-of-view character in many chapters, investigating a rape and a suicide which eventually, somewhat coincidentally, intersect with Rebus's more valued murder cases. This pattern will continue in other books, as she either works a different case from Rebus or a completely different aspect of a case.

Laura Severin, writing at the time of the publication of Exit Music, sorted out the roles of Rebus, Cafferty, and Clarke thus: “Rebus has an investment in a patriarchy structured around evil and good, while Clarke … is already an inhabitant of a postpatriarchal world more alert to social, cultural and political complexities.” Although Clarke's “postpatriarchal” world has not thus far replaced Rebus's struggle with Cafferty, Set in Darkness is the first novel in which it is sketched.

== Reception ==
The novel was well-received, with Publishers Weekly giving it a starred review and praising the "strong characters" and "masterful twist", and Kirkus Reviews praising the portrayal of: "mordant family relationships, professional infighting, and the near-lethal mistakes of a good man."
