= Rather Be the Devil =

2016 novel by Ian Rankin

- Author: Ian Rankin
- Language: English
- Series: Inspector Rebus
- Genre: Detective fiction
- Publisher: Orion Books
- Publication date: 3 November 2016
- Publication place: Scotland
- Media type: Print
- Pages: 310
- ISBN: 978-1-4091-5940-7
- Preceded by: Even Dogs in the Wild
- Followed by: In a House of Lies
- Website: Author's webpage

Rather Be the Devil is the 21st instalment in the Inspector Rebus series of crime novels, published in November 2016. Rather Be the Devil topped the bestseller charts for hardback fiction. The title was inspired by a John Martyn song from his 1973 album Solid Air.

== Plot summary ==
The novel opens and closes with Rebus and his girlfriend, Deborah Quant (a forensic pathologist) dining in a restaurant which is part of the Waldorf Caledonian Hotel. Rebus is reminded of the 1978 murder at this hotel of Maria Turquand, an unsolved case in which Edinburgh bankers and pop stars were suspects. Rebus revisits the case, which becomes intertwined with others more actively pursued by the police in the coming week.

DI Malcolm Fox has been promoted to Gartcosh where Police Scotland have the Scottish Crime Campus. Meanwhile, in Edinburgh, DI Siobhan Clarke is investigating the mugging of Darryl Christie, a young gangster who, in Standing in Another Man's Grave (2012), stepped into the void created by 'Big Ger' Cafferty's withdrawal from power in Edinburgh. Because HM Revenue and Customs are interested in a shell companies scheme involving Christie and banking scion Anthony Brough, Fox is sent back to Edinburgh to join Clarke's investigation. Then a retired policeman dies, drowned with his hands bound, shortly after talking to Rebus about the Turquand case. This brings a Gartcosh Murder Inquiry Team to Edinburgh, and Fox is asked to join this team as well. Rebus manages to follow both enquiries, and Fox sees to it that Siobhan Clarke comes to the attention of the Gartcosh MIT group, and so the three are again working together.

Meanwhile, 'Big Ger' Cafferty is ready to make a comeback.

Against this backdrop is Rebus's diagnosis of COPD, and his wait for word about from the doctors about a shadow on his lung (which he has named Hank Marvin). This leads to him quitting cigarettes and moderating his alcohol intake.
