= Midnight and Blue =

2024 novel by Ian Rankin

Midnight & Blue
- Author: Ian Rankin
- Language: English
- Series: Inspector Rebus
- Genre: Detective fiction
- Set in: Edinburgh
- Publisher: Orion Books
- Publication date: October 2024
- Publication place: Scotland
- Media type: Print (hardback & paperback)
- Pages: 352 pp
- ISBN: 978-1398709423
- Preceded by: A Heart Full of Headstones

Midnight and Blue (also Midnight & Blue) is the 25th novel in the Inspector Rebus series by Scottish author Ian Rankin. It also exists as an audiobook, narrated by James MacPherson.

== Plot ==
Rebus is nearing 70 and has been in HMP Edinburgh for six months. The novel carries on directly from A Heart Full of Headstones, which culminated in Rebus' conviction for the attempted murder of his old nemesis, Big Ger Cafferty. Now, Rebus himself is behind bars. Two parallel investigations follow: one set in Saughton Prison, in which a prisoner is found dead in a locked cell, a homicide case which is taken over by Christine Esson, with Rebus as a possible suspect. The second follows DI Siobhan Clarke, as her investigation into the disappearance of a schoolgirl leads her into a world of 'online pornography, pseudo-celebrities and exploitation.' Meanwhile, Edinburgh's underworld struggles to fill the vacuum left by the death of Ger Cafferty, with the return of DCI Malcolm Fox, first introduced in The Complaints, as well as a number of other returning characters, including the psychopathic drug lord Darryl Christie, who seems to offer unlikely support for Rebus in his new environment.

Originally he was in the Separation and Reintegration Unit (SRU) like both ex-cops and those prisoners who are in danger themselves or a danger to others. He is moved after three months to Trinity Hall which has a mixture of those awaiting trial and those convicted. He has a single cell, and is under the protection of Darryl Christie, who thanks him for getting rid of Big Ger Cafferty. He tells Darryl he was 'pretty average' at school and bunked off a lot, but has tried to make up for it since. He works in the library. He used to start reading a number of books, but he did not finish many of them. The library is small but well-stocked with both books and DVDs. Each cell has a TV set with a built-in DVD player (which is an essential part of the plot).

He is visited by his daughter Samantha but not her daughter Carrie as he does not want Carrie to see him in prison. DI Siobhan Clarke looks after Samantha and Carrie and his dog Brillo; Carrie becomes very attached to Brillo. At the end his lawyers tell him they have 'very good news for him', although no details are given. They have been appealing his case, but he frequently complains about the delay.

== Themes ==
Like A Heart Full of Headstones, Midnight & Blue deals with the themes of the past, the grey areas between good and evil, past mistakes and taking responsibility for them, as well as those of ageing and mortality. Ian Rankin has described Rebus, ageing alongside him in real time, as a kind of proxy, saying: 'He takes on all the aches and pains... that are waiting around the corner for me. I give all that stuff to him so I don’t have to worry about it so much.'

== Reception ==
The novel was enthusiastically received, with Kirkus Reviews praising the 'vividly detailed portrait of the labyrinthine corridors of power in the prison,' and The Guardian calling it 'An expertly plotted... addition to a standout series.'

Stuart Kelly in The Scotsman of 5 October 2024 says that there are two crimes under investigation in the novel (three, if the missing teenager is included), but that readers wanting to solve them need to be alert. He goes on to say that the author manages to fulfil expectations without succumbing to the formulaic.

The Sunday Times in 2024 says: 'Rankin has taken the police procedural and transformed (it) into an epic character study of a man and his city.'

== Composition ==
In his 2024 End-of-year roundup 2024 Rankin said that he started work on Midnight and Blue towards the end of 2023, and finished it in the first four or five months of 2024. In the Acknowledgements at the end of the novel he says that it is a work of fiction, and that the prison in it should not be confused with the real prison in Edinburgh. He also said that he was grateful to staff and inmates of the real prison, and said that he aimed to show that prisons are places where compassion and hope can be manifested.
