= The Falls (Rankin novel) =

2001 crime novel by Ian Rankin

- First edition
- Author: Ian Rankin
- Language: English
- Series: Inspector Rebus
- Genre: Detective fiction
- Publisher: Orion Books
- Publication date: 2001
- Publication place: Scotland
- Media type: Print
- Pages: 475 pages
- ISBN: 0-7528-4405-9
- OCLC: 59522317
- Preceded by: Set in Darkness
- Followed by: Resurrection Men

The Falls is a 2001 crime novel by Ian Rankin. It is the twelfth of the Inspector Rebus novels.

== Plot summary ==
A student vanishes in Edinburgh and her wealthy family of bankers has put Lothian and Borders Police under pressure to find her. The novel presents a difficult case, where the newly appointed Chief Super, Gill Templer, is trying to please her superiors and CID officers. In the course of the novel, DC Siobhan Clarke must decide whether to take a plum position offered her by DCS Templer or stick with investigation in the style of John Rebus.

Two sets of clues, one dating from the nineteenth century, one from the twenty-first, appear. A carved wooden doll in a coffin found near the missing woman's East Lothian home leads Rebus to the National Museum of Scotland's collection of dolls in coffins found on Arthur's Seat in 1836, after the famous Burke and Hare murders in Edinburgh. Rebus also wanders into the Surgeons' Hall, where he meets several forensic pathologists of his acquaintance and sees the Burke and Hare exhibit there. A museum curator, Jean Burchill, alerts him to what might be a more recent serial killer marking his exploits with such coffins. While Rebus pursues these historical angles in libraries, police archives, and museums, DC Siobhan Clarke follows an electronic trail via computer and mobile phone. Clarke discovers that the woman who disappeared had been playing an Internet role-playing game, and tackles the virtual Quizmaster, risking the same fate as the missing girl.

== TV adaptation ==
The Falls was the first episode in the second Rebus television series, starring Ken Stott, airing in 2006. Rankin has a small cameo in the episode as: "the anonymous... bystander who rescues a woman from being mugged."

== Reception ==
The book was well-received, becoming a UK Number 1 bestseller, with The Guardian praising the portrayal of Rankin's multiple versions of Edinburgh and the "interaction between Rankin's disparate group of prickly characters." Kirkus Reviews said: "Readers will find no city more beautiful than Edinburgh, no locale more intriguing than Arthur’s Seat—and no characters in the genre more provocative or sharply delineated than Rankin’s ongoing cast." Publishers Weekly gave the book a starred review, stating: "Rankin's brilliant evocation of a moody Edinburgh, deeply human characters and labyrinthine plot give dimension to this always absorbing series."
