= In a House of Lies =

2018 book by Ian Rankin

- First edition
- Author: Ian Rankin
- Language: English
- Series: Inspector Rebus
- Release number: 22
- Genre: Detective fiction
- Set in: Scotland
- Publisher: Orion Books
- Publication place: Scotland
- English publication date: October 2018
- Media type: Hardback
- Pages: 372
- ISBN: 9781409176886
- Preceded by: Rather Be the Devil
- Followed by: A Song for the Dark Times
- Website: Author's webpage

In a House of Lies is the 22nd novel in the Inspector Rebus series written by Ian Rankin.

Rebus, now retired and in poor health, is called in to revisit a cold case in which the body of an investigator is discovered in the boot of a car, secured with police-issue handcuffs.

== Plot ==
Some boys discover a car with a long-dead body in the boot, in a woodland which has been the subject of a property dispute. Rebus, now retired, worked the badly-handled 2006 missing-persons case. He had tried to protect the missing man's lover, the son of a detective inspector in the old Strathclyde Police, and had also been hoping to tie in 'Big Ger' Cafferty. The murder inquiry now is handled by a team from Police Scotland, but Detective Inspector Siobhan Clarke and Detective Inspector Malcolm Fox are included. Clarke has recently been investigated by a corrupt pair of Anti-Corruption Unit officers for leaking information to a reporter, and she is being harassed by a mysterious person over a recent case. Rebus, at her request, re-investigates that case; he tangles with the ACU team, and hopes again to see Cafferty connected to the body-in-the-boot murder.

Rebus is suffering from COPD and has given up cigarettes and almost stopped drinking alcohol. The book gives some attention to modern media and its potential for both public and private bullying.

== Background ==
Ian Rankin has stated that inspiration for the novel in part came from the murder of Daniel Morgan, who was a private detective in South London in the late 1980s. He died of axe wounds to his head in a pub car park in Sydenham, South London in 1987. He was investigating alleged police corruption at the time.

== Reception ==
The book was a bestseller, entering the hardback chart at No. 1 on the first week of its release. Reception was largely positive; Barry Forshaw, writing in The Guardian, said, "How has Rankin kept the series fresh for 22 novels? Deft characterisation. Readers must keep up with a lengthy dramatis personae, but there’s nothing wrong with making us work a little." Likewise, Mark Sanderson, writing in the Evening Standard, called the book "A brilliantly twisted case for Rebus" and said that "..no one in Britain writes better crime novels today." Paul Connolly (The Metro) gave the novel four stars out of five and said that the novel had:

a plot so complex it will elude anything other than total concentration, Rankin crafts one of the great Rebus novels, a vibrant slab of a book as gripping as it is intoxicating.

Julian Cole, writing in the Northern Echo, gave the book four stars out of five, and called it "...[a] good rattling read, let down only by too many unnecessary dialogue modifiers."
