= The Impossible Dead =

2011 crime novel by Ian Rankin

- Author: Ian Rankin
- Language: English
- Genre: Detective novel
- Publisher: Orion Books
- Publication date: 13 October 2011
- Publication place: United Kingdom
- Media type: Print (hardback & paperback)
- Pages: 384 pp
- ISBN: 0752889532
- Preceded by: The Complaints

The Impossible Dead is a 2011 novel written by the Scottish author Ian Rankin. It is the second novel in the Malcolm Fox series.

== Plot ==
Inspector Malcolm Fox and his team from the Lothian and Borders Police department of “Complaints” (Professional Ethics and Standards), Tony Kaye and Joe Naysmith, are assigned to an investigation in the town of Kirkcaldy in Fife. Detective Sergeant Paul Carter has been found guilty of misconduct, and Fox’s job is to reassure the Fife Constabulary that the other Kirkcaldy police are clean. Fox visits Paul’s uncle Alan Carter, who had reported Paul, and is drawn into the murder investigation when Alan is killed and Paul is framed for it. Fox and his team must dodge, while exploiting as sources, not only the hostile Kirkcaldy police but contingents of Fife headquarters CID, Murder Squad, and even an emissary from London’s Special Branch.

When Fox visited him, Alan Carter was investigating the suspicious 1985 death of an Edinburgh lawyer named Francis Vernal, who was involved with Scottish Nationalist paramilitaries in the 1980s, including Dark Harvest, a terrorist group trying to use anthrax. Fox becomes obsessed by Vernal’s story, in part because there are similarities between Vernal’s death and Carter’s murder. He interviews various former associates of Vernal, including his onetime law partner, his widow, a madman, a TV personality, and a Chief Constable who is herself trying to deal with a group of terrorists. Eventually Fox identifies the person who killed both Vernal and Carter, but Fox has to risk his own life to capture them.

== Structure and place ==
The novel takes place over about three weeks. Most of the investigations are in Fife, but the team returns to Edinburgh every night. Interwoven with the investigations is Fox’s relationship with his father and sister, marked by his father’s suffering a stroke.

This is the second of Rankin’s novels to feature Malcolm Fox as the sole protagonist, following The Complaints. He is a minor antagonist (with very little attention paid to his point of view) in Standing in Another Man's Grave, the novel which follows, where John Rebus is the main protagonist. In the novel after that, Saints of the Shadow Bible, Fox and Rebus work together on a case and come to respect each other.
