= Arthur's Seat coffins =

Scottish artifacts discovered in 1836

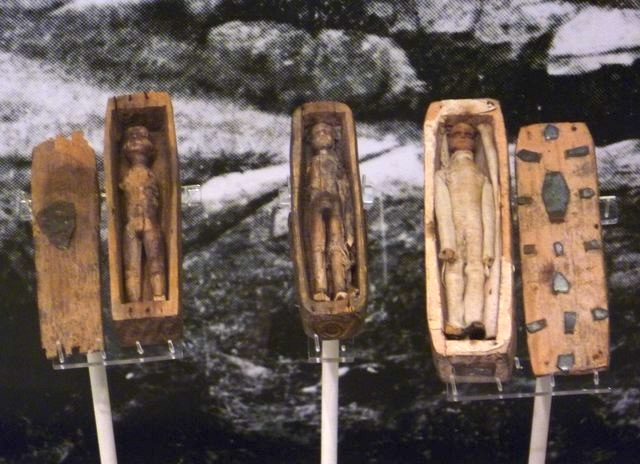
- Arthur's Seat coffins in the National Museum of Scotland
- Material: Scots pine
- Length: 95–104 mm (3 3/4–4 1/8 in)
- Height: 20–26 mm (13/16–1 in)
- Width: 18–30 mm (11/16–1 3/16 in)
- Discovered: 25 June 1836

The Arthur's Seat coffins are miniature wooden coffins discovered in 1836, inside a niche in the northeastern range of Arthur's Seat, near Edinburgh. The coffins were decorated with lozenge-shaped ornaments, and contained anthropomorphic figures, formerly toy soldiers, at least some of which were clothed in cotton garments. The purpose of the coffins is unknown, and a number of theories have been proposed, one of which ties them to the West Port murders notoriously committed by William Burke and William Hare. A number of reports from the period give slightly different accounts of the discovery. Eight of the original 17 coffins remain, and are on display in the National Museum of Scotland.

== Discovery ==
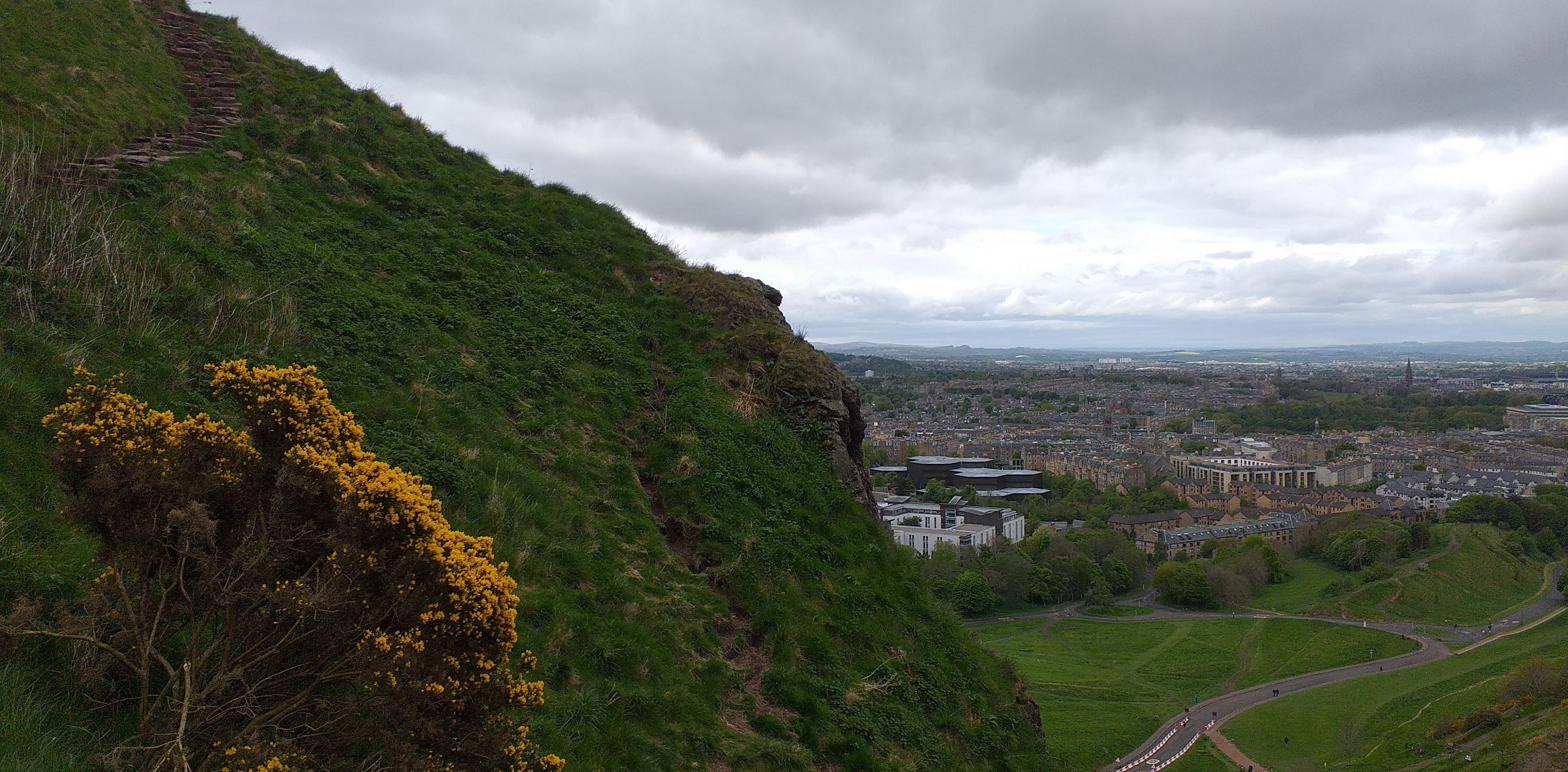
Arthur's Seat

A 1956 account from the Edinburgh Evening News, possibly based on an earlier source, states that the coffins were discovered on 25 June 1836, when a group of boys climbing Arthur’s Seat stumbled upon a small hidden niche. Within the recess, they found seventeen miniature coffins with wooden figurines inside them. A number of reports from the period give slightly different accounts of the discovery.

The Scotsman was the first news outlet to report the discovery. In its account the boys were looking for rabbit burrows in the north-eastern range of Arthur’s Seat, an extinct volcano to the east of Edinburgh city centre. An account from Notes & Queries placed the discovery at the foot of Salisbury Crags, and a report in the Caledonian Mercury states that the discovery of the coffins occurred "at the back of Arthur’s Seat", which historian Mike Dash locates at the southern side of the hill. Notes & Queries claimed that the niche was covered by a protruding rock which was dislodged as one of the boys grabbed it to break his fall. According to The Scotsman, during the boys' search their attention was drawn to an oddly shaped opening in the rocks, closed by three sheets of slate "rudely cut at the upper ends into a conical form, and so placed as to protect the interior from the effects of the weather". After removing the sheets of slate the boys discovered a small niche, one square foot in size (according to the Edinburgh Evening News its dimensions were "about a foot in height and about 18 inches wide"), in which they found 17 miniature coffins, laid out in three tiers, two tiers consisting of eight coffins and the upper-most tier of only one.

== Description ==
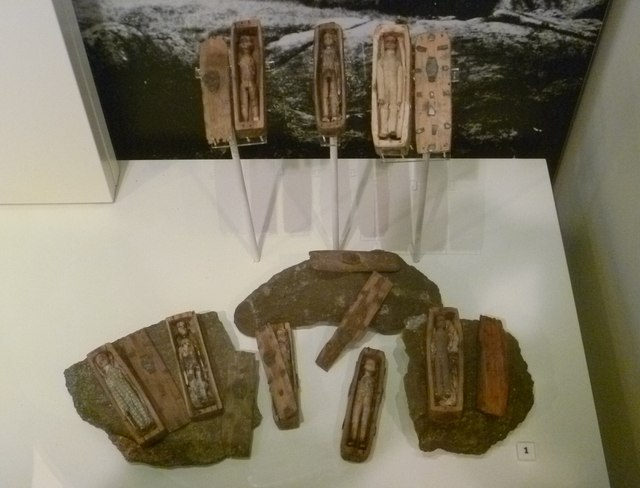
The Arthur's Seat coffins on display in the National Museum of Scotland in 2011

The size of the coffins varies: 95–104 mm (3 3/4–4 1/8 in) in length, 18–30 mm (11/16–1 3/16 in) in width, and 20–26 mm (13/16–1 in) in height. Each coffin was made out of a single piece of Scots pine. The lids were attached with brass pins of different sizes, most of which are still in place; however, some are bent over and some are missing their pinheads, a result of the coffins being pried open. Both the lids and the sides were decorated with small lozenge-shaped tinned iron ornaments, identified as latches used to connect buckles to late eighteenth and early nineteenth-century shoes, though coffin No. 3 had latches cut out of a brass sheet, possibly from a mirror plate, also consistent with the fashion prevalent during the early nineteenth century. Six of the coffins had nails made out of material identical to that of the latches, and were similarly related to leather working or shoe making.

The coffins were carved in two distinct shapes. While five of the coffins (1, 2, 4, 6, 8) had squared edges and tapered toward the ends, three (3, 5, 7) had prominently rounded edges and ends. As such the two styles may have been produced by two different individuals. On the exterior of two of the coffins (2, 4), both belonging to the square variety, red or pink paint is visible, and coffin No. 2 is distinct in being the only coffin lined with woven paper, most probably made of post-1780 rag fiber.

Each coffin contained an anthropomorphic figure made of close-grained white wood, the carving quality of which has been described as "excellent". The figures, identified as former toy soldiers, are all of nearly identical height (81–86 mm [3 3/16–3 3/8 in]), though some are thinner than others, and they are consistent in detail, evidently crafted by the same individual and most probably coming from the same set. Contributing to their identification as soldiers are their straight backs, open eyes, lower bodies formed as if clothed in tight knee breeches and hose, feet made flat on the bottom to facilitate standing and blackened to resemble boots, blackened areas on the head to resemble hair, and a drawn "hat-line" around the head suggesting the existence of a hat. The size and shape of the heads varies; however, the fine facial features are remarkably similar.

A number of the figures are dressed or covered in cotton garments, and according to The Scotsman were "laid out with all the funeral trappings, which usually form the last habiliments of the dead". According to reports of the period, at the time of discovery the coffins were in different stages of decay, implying that they had been placed there over an extended period of time. The bottom-most tier was described as the most afflicted, the mid tier less so; the only coffin in the third tier reportedly appeared as though it had been placed there only days before discovery. However, the suggestion that the coffins were deposited at different times over a prolonged period has been disputed, since in a wet environment such deterioration could have occurred over a relatively short time (such as a year) whether the coffins had been placed there at separate times or all at once. According to The Scotsman, a number of the coffins "were destroyed by the boys pelting them at each other as unmeaning and contemptible trifles". No more than eight of the original coffins are known to exist.

== Dating ==
No carbon dating or dendrochronological analysis has been carried out on the coffins. However, the date of burial can be deduced to a certain degree from the surviving "burial garments". The clothes on the figurines were sewn with cotton thread, which had replaced linen thread in Scotland from approximately 1800, and one suit was sewn with three-ply thread, which had not appeared before 1812 and had become popular during the 1830s, according to expert Philip Sykas of Manchester Art Galleries. It was concluded both by Sykas and Naomi Tarrant, curator of European textiles at the National Museum of Scotland, that the coffins were likely buried during the 1830s.

== Provenance ==
According to the Edinburgh Evening News, the day after the discovery the coffins were retrieved by the boys' schoolmaster, one Mr. Ferguson, who also belonged to an unidentified local archaeological society. Ferguson took the coffins home and pried them open with a knife, later bringing them to the society's next meeting, much to the amazement of his colleagues. Mike Dash has found two possible identifications for Ferguson, as two schoolmasters by that name worked in the Edinburgh area at the time: Findlay Ferguson, a teacher of mathematics and English at Easter Duddingston, and George Ferguson, a master of classics at Edinburgh Academy; neither was a member of the Society of Antiquaries of Scotland nor of the Bannatyne Club, the Edinburgh-based historical publishing society. Dash concluded that the most likely candidate was Findlay Ferguson, since Duddingston is near the southern face of Arthur's Seat, the most probable location of the discovery.

At some point, the coffins were put on display in the private museum of Robert Frazer, a jeweller and seal engraver from 17 South Andrews Street in Edinburgh, who was an elected member of the Society of Antiquaries of Scotland. Frazer's museum housed a number of exhibits which had been deemed unsuitable for the Society's collection, and the coffins had possibly been rejected as nothing more than mere curiosities. In 1845, after Frazer had retired, the museum was closed, and over a few days at the end of April and the beginning of May the collection was put up for auction. Lot 300, "the celebrated Lilliputian coffins found on Arthur’s Seat, 1836", was sold for £4 8/- (Note: Four pounds and eight shillings: the equivalent of post-Decimal Day £4.40. Menefee and Simpson describe it as a "then substantial sum".) to an unknown bidder. According to Menefee and Simpson, it is possible that Edinburgh publisher Thomas Clark bought the coffins at the auction in 1845, as his daughter, "Christina Couper of Tynron Manse, near Thornhill, Dumfriesshire", donated eight of them to the National Museum of Scotland in 1901. Besides the coffins, the donation included the information card that had been displayed with them in the museum, as well as one of the three pieces of slate that had been used to close the hidden recess: "a small slab of dark-gray slate 3 3/4″ × 1 5/8″ rudely shaped like the headstone of a grave", presumably from one of the slate belts in the West Highlands or the Ballachulish quarries. The collection has been on almost constant exhibit in the National Museum of Scotland ever since its donation.

== Interpretations ==
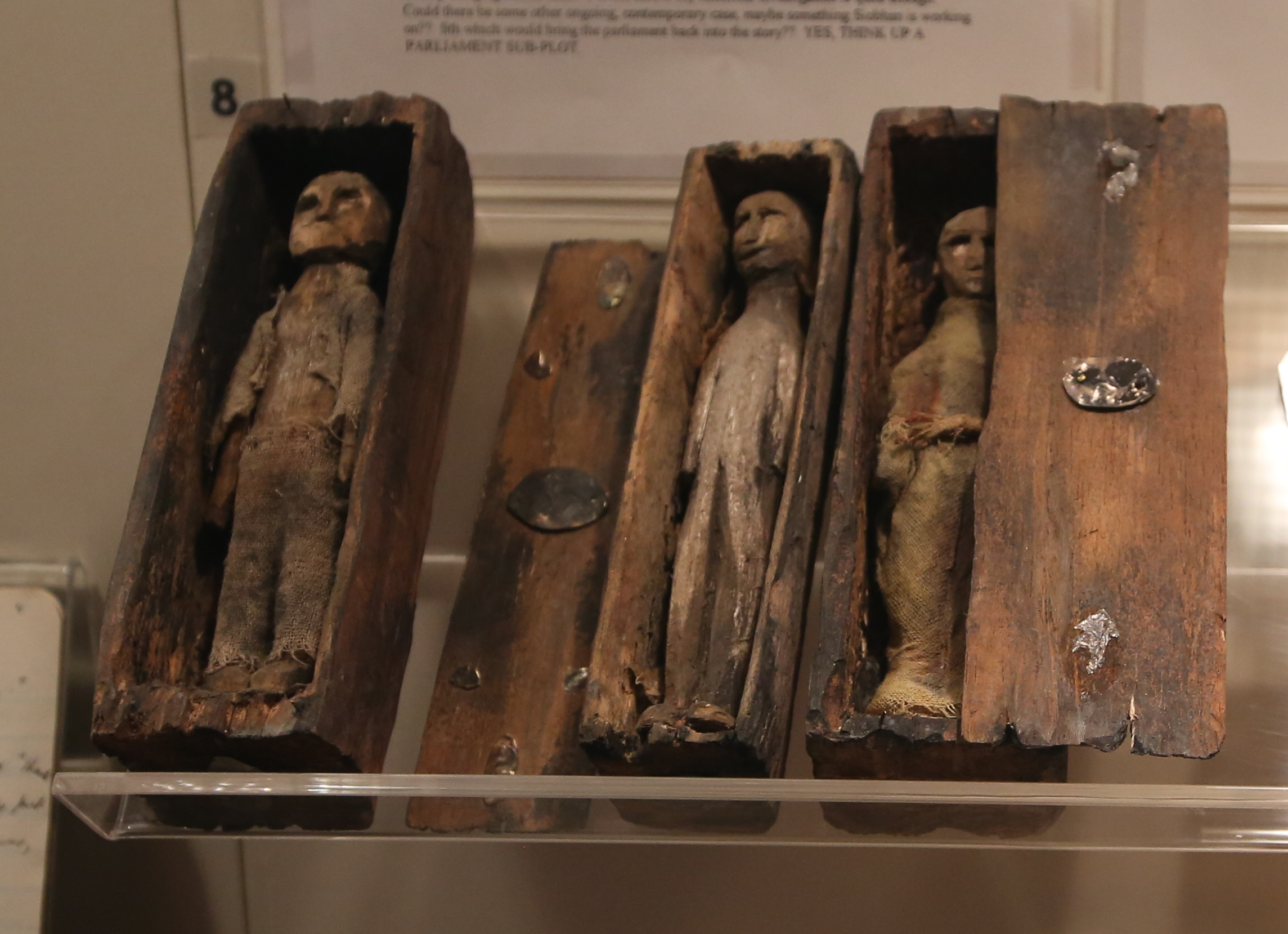
The coffins on display in 2016

The purpose of the coffins is unknown, and a number of theories have been suggested. Menefee and Simpson reject most of them, and the one they propose is not beyond conjecture. The original report in The Scotsman mentioned a possible connection to witchcraft, in which the figurines would have served as effigies for sympathetic magic. Although such Scottish corp creadh have been well documented, they were primarily made to be destroyed, and no signs of deliberate effigy mutilation is evident on the figures.

Another theory, proposed by the Edinburgh Evening Post on 20 August 1836, suggests that the coffins were a continuation of an ancient German-Saxon custom of burying effigies to commemorate people who had died overseas. However, it has been objected that there is no obvious way for this custom to have spread to Scotland. It also appears that these coffins were buried together and not individually, and no catastrophe that claimed 17 lives and justified such a response is known to have occurred. On 25 August 1836, the Caledonian Mercury proposed it as a custom among Scottish sailors to leave an effigy of themselves with their wives, to be buried in case they died while at sea. However, Menefee and Simpson cast doubt on the existence of such a custom, pointing out that the proposal does not explain why these would be the only evidence of such a custom ever found, why so many were buried together, and why they were not buried in a traditional burial ground.

The 1902 Proceedings of the Society of Antiquaries of Scotland proposed that the coffins symbolized an honorific burial, and that they were the work of an individual who was mentally impaired. Although Menefee and Simpson admit that such a theory is difficult to disprove, they point out that it also lacks any proof or explanation of rationale. In comparing the Edinburgh find to a similar find from the debris of a house belonging to the Schooner Society in Lübeck, Walter Hävernick, a German folklorist and museum director, suggested that the coffins and their enclosed anthropomorphic figures derived from an occult practice of placing a mandrake in a coffin for it to serve as an oracle or for it to serve as a good luck talisman. According to this theory, the coffins may have been the hidden stash of a merchant who intended to sell them. The comparison is difficult, however, as the coffins from Lübeck were dated to 1710 and 1711, and those from Edinburgh were constructed differently and buried in a different country approximately a century later.

A theory by Menefee and Simpson suggests that the figures in their coffins represented the 17 victims of Burke and Hare in the 1827–1829 West Port murders, and that this burial was intended to bring peace to the victims' spirits – they had been brutally murdered, and were disposed of without proper ceremony after dissection by Robert Knox. A flaw in this theory has been presented by Mike Dash, citing the fact that, while 12 of the West Port murder victims were women, all of the figures in the coffins were dressed as if they were men, thus leaving room for further investigation.

== In popular culture ==
The coffins figure prominently in the 2001 crime novel The Falls by Ian Rankin. In the introduction, Rankin wrote that the coffins and the enclosed dolls inspired him to write the story, especially since their actual purpose remains unknown. The novel was adapted for television in 2006.
