= Fleshmarket Close =

2004 crime novel by Ian Rankin

- First edition
- Author: Ian Rankin
- Language: English
- Series: Inspector Rebus
- Genre: Detective fiction
- Publisher: Orion Books
- Publication date: 2004
- Publication place: Scotland
- Media type: Print (hardback & paperback)
- Pages: 399 pp
- ISBN: 0-7528-5112-8
- OCLC: 57380705
- Preceded by: A Question of Blood
- Followed by: The Naming of the Dead

Fleshmarket Close is a 2004 crime novel by Ian Rankin. It is the fifteenth of the Inspector Rebus novels. It was released in the US under the title Fleshmarket Alley.

The novel was the basis for the second episode in the second Rebus television series starring Ken Stott, which was aired in 2006.

== Background ==
Fleshmarket Close is named after a real close in Edinburgh between the High Street and Market Street, crossing Cockburn Street. "Fleshmarket" is the Scots term for a butcher's market. The author has stated that the reason for the change of title for the US release was the publisher's belief that a US public might not be familiar with the term "close".

== Plot summary ==
Detective Inspector John Rebus has no desk to work from, as a hint from his superiors that he should consider retirement, but he and his protégée Siobhan Clarke are still investigating some seemingly unconnected cases. The sister of a dead rape victim is missing; skeletons turn up embedded in a concrete floor; a Kurdish journalist is brutally murdered; and the son of a Glasgow gangster has moved into the Edinburgh vice scene.

The book uses two new settings: a sink estate divided between the indigenous population and refugees (based on Wester Hailes), and a small town whose economy is dominated by an internment camp for asylum seekers (based on Dungavel).

== Themes ==
The novel deals with themes of immigration, asylum seekers and the outsider as well as those of "community and shared history and people who don’t fit in." Critics have also spoken of the "relationship between crime and location," and the author's portrayal of the darker side of Edinburgh. Publishers Weekly says: "Rebus remains one of the more compelling characters in crime fiction—and Rebus's Edinburgh one of the more compelling settings."

== Reception ==
The book was enthusiastically received, with Kirkus Reviews commenting on the "rich and complex" plotting, and calling the Rebus series "the best thing to come out of Scotland since single malt."
