= A Song for the Dark Times =

2020 book by Ian Rankin

- First edition
- Author: Ian Rankin
- Language: English
- Series: Inspector Rebus
- Release number: 23
- Genre: Detective fiction
- Set in: Scotland
- Publisher: Orion Books
- Publication place: Scotland
- English publication date: 1 October 2020
- Media type: Paperback
- Pages: 327
- ISBN: 9781409176886
- Preceded by: In a House of Lies
- Followed by: A Heart Full of Headstones
- Website: Author's webpage

A Song for the Dark Times is the 23rd installment in the Inspector Rebus series written by Ian Rankin. The phrase "dark times" was intended to refer to world events as of 2019, but the book was published in 2020, in a period of COVID-19 lockdowns. The title is from one of the book’s epigraphs, Bertolt Brecht on “singing in/about the dark times”; also, “Songs for the Dark Times” is the title Siobhan Clarke gives to a CD compilation she has burned for John Rebus, which he plays while driving north in his car.

== Plot ==
Siobhan Clarke helps Rebus move down two flights of stairs to a ground-floor flat in the same Arden Street tenement. On his first morning in the new flat, Rebus gets a call from his daughter Samantha saying her partner, Keith, is missing.

Rebus immediately makes the long drive to the (fictional) village of Naver near Tongue in the extreme north of Scotland. He finds Keith’s body. Investigating the murder, Rebus discovers that Keith was obsessed with the history of a nearby World War II prison camp, of which some of the survivors settled locally and are still alive. The local police see Samantha as the obvious suspect in Keith’s murder. While Rebus can’t help considering this possibility, he researches other options.

Meanwhile in Edinburgh, Siobhan Clarke and Malcolm Fox are part of the Murder Inquiry Team looking into the mysterious killing of a Saudi student. This takes them into the world of wealthy international socialites and their financial projects. The dead man’s closest friend was a young Scottish aristocrat whose family trust owns most of the area around Tongue, so Rebus’s investigations overlap with Siobhan’s.

The gangster ‘Big Ger’ Cafferty now runs an exclusive club where he films the guests to obtain blackmail material, and he involves Fox in one of his blackmail projects. Though Fox plays along, Cafferty’s attempt to control him and his Police Scotland boss ultimately fails. At the end of the novel, a young thug with a gun is on his way to see Cafferty, without warning.

== Reception ==
Reviewers expressed strong but sometimes qualified enthusiasm for the book. Stuart Kelly, in The Scotsman, commented: “But piecing [the solutions] together balances readerly patience with the impetus of the plot” and “ There is a general feeling that everything is going to hell in a handcart” without any bright notes except Rebus’s sheer ability to survive. The Guardian noted the publication only in a roundup of thrillers, praising it (like Kelly) primarily for keeping Rebus going. A brief review by Mark Sanderson in The Times ends with the declaration, "Only great novels capture the spirit of the age. This is one of them."
