= The Hanging Garden (Rankin novel) =

1998 novel by Ian Rankin

- First edition
- Author: Ian Rankin
- Language: English
- Series: Inspector Rebus
- Genre: Detective fiction
- Publisher: Orion Books
- Publication date: 1998
- Publication place: Scotland
- Media type: Print
- Pages: 529 pages
- ISBN: 0-7528-0721-8
- OCLC: 60611214
- Preceded by: Black and Blue
- Followed by: Dead Souls

The Hanging Garden is a 1998 crime novel by Ian Rankin. It is the ninth of the Inspector Rebus novels. It was the second episode in the Rebus television series starring John Hannah, airing in 2001.

== Plot summary ==
Detective Inspector John Rebus, stationed at St. Leonard's in Edinburgh, is involved in four cases which turn out to be intertwined. He is removed from the investigation of the murder of "Mr Taystee," an ice-cream vendor, and assigned instead to investigate Lintz, a possible Nazi war criminal living quietly in Edinburgh (his history is based on the World War II massacre at Oradour-sur-Glane in France). His conversations with Lintz about guilt and responsibility cause Rebus to recall being stationed in Belfast at the beginning of the Troubles. Rebus also volunteers to be the liaison with Crime Squad's surveillance of up-and-coming gangster Tommy Telford. Finally, he stumbles into the role of protector of a traumatised Bosnian prostitute, who has associations both with Telford and with a Chechen gangster named Tarawicz -"Mr Pink Eyes"- operating out of Newcastle; she leads the police to the discovery that Japanese "businessmen" (one of whom turns out to be a Yakuza member) are associated with Telford. 'Big Ger' Cafferty, who is still serving his time in Barlinnie Prison, is thought to be engineering attacks on Telford, to maintain control of crime in Edinburgh, and Rebus and his colleagues must track the growing gang war. Rebus's insights lead the Crime Squad to mount an operation against Telford using Rebus's old friend (and Alcoholics Anonymous sponsor) Jack Morton, who is killed as the operation goes wrong.

Rebus' daughter Sammy (Samantha) is knocked down in what looks like a deliberate hit-and-run. Through most of the novel, she is unconscious, with her mother Rhona and, often, Rebus's ex Patience Aitken at her bedside. Rebus visits her hospital room but again and again he leaves to investigate or confront the various gang leaders and members. Although he resists Telford's assumption that he is part of 'Big Ger' Cafferty's team, he asks Cafferty to find the driver of the hit-and-run, certain that someone was trying to send him a message. In the end, this is not the case.

== TV adaptation ==
There are major differences between the novel and the TV adaptation; these include the omission of the storyline involving a suspected Nazi war criminal.

== Structure ==
The title refers to The Cure's song "The Hanging Garden". ("Mr Pink Eyes" is another song by The Cure.) It also evokes the World War II massacre Rebus is investigating, which involved hanging the town leaders from trees. Each of the three books has a title drawn from the song "The Hanging Garden."

The novel begins with a short, two-chapter Book 1 in which Rebus says good-bye to Sammy on Guy Fawkes night and, a few hours later, finds her unconscious in the hospital after a hit-and-run. Book 2 occupies chapters 3-11 and provides a flashback filling in Rebus's various cases leading up to Guy Fawkes night, including persuading Sammy to provide shelter for the Bosnian prostitute. Book 3, which takes up the rest of the novel, returns to Rebus on November 6 and follows him as he gathers up the loose ends and provides the insights which lead to (potentially) dismantling not only Telford's but Tarawicz's gangs.

Interspersed between the books are italicized vignettes with scenes from Rebus's marriage: first, an argument with his wife, then a day when he failed to watch Sammy at the beach, then Sammy's birth, and, finally, learning that his wife was pregnant.

== Place in the Rebus novels ==
"The division or turning-point in Rankin's career came in 1997 with the publication of Black & Blue," which showed more "ambition and range" than earlier books in the series, and also broke out of the limitations of genre to become a bestseller, interweaving an unsolved historical serial killer case with a view of the Scottish oil industry. The Hanging Garden is "comparable in scope," since the "sheer range of subjects ... is one of the keys" to the novel's success as a followup to the breakthrough Black & Blue. According to Allan Massie in The Scotsman, The Hanging Garden not only "confirmed [Rankin's] reputation" but "suggested that the categorisation of fiction into straight and crime novels is obsolete." Gill Plain points out that The Hanging Garden intensifies Rebus's personal anguish and guilt over his failures as a soldier and a husband/lover/father, focused now on Sammy's terrible accident, while denying the character "the consolations of closure," since solving the whodunnits does not really distribute guilt to the perpetrators in this novel. Plain suggests that the emotional intensity of The Hanging Garden could not be sustained in the following novel, Dead Souls, since the continued "twisting of the knife" leads to a bleakness that becomes "static."

Plain also points out that the Professor Lintz character, a respected citizen who probably supervised a Nazi massacre, is another example of the Jekyll and Hyde theme which Rankin had pursued through his first few Rebus novels. The importance of Jack Morton, as well as Rebus's guilty recollections of Sammy's kidnapping, tie The Hanging Garden to the first Rebus novel, Knots and Crosses.

== Reception ==
The novel was largely well-received, with Kirkus Reviews praising "action that’s relentlessly slam-bang, plotting that’s labyrinthine," and calling Rebus "one of the most charismatic heroes in contemporary crime fiction," although Publishers Weekly called it "sprawling" and "overloaded."
