= Even Dogs in the Wild =

2015 novel featuring inspector Rebus

- First edition
- Author: Ian Rankin
- Language: English
- Series: Inspector Rebus
- Genre: Detective fiction
- Publisher: Orion Books
- Publication date: 5 November 2015
- Publication place: Scotland
- Media type: Print
- Pages: 352
- ISBN: 1409159361
- OCLC: 60794519
- Preceded by: Saints of the Shadow Bible
- Followed by: Rather Be the Devil

Even Dogs in the Wild is the twentieth installment in the bestselling Inspector Rebus series of crime novels, published in 2015. The novel takes its name from the song of the same name by the Scottish band The Associates from their album The Affectionate Punch.

== Plot summary ==
A former Scottish senior prosecutor has been found dead, with a threatening note in his pocket. Siobhan Clarke is in charge of the high-profile case. Then the semi-retired gangster 'Big Ger' Cafferty receives a similar note and someone shoots at him. John Rebus has retired (for the second time), but he is asked to join in the investigation. Meanwhile Malcolm Fox is drafted into a surveillance team monitoring a group of Glaswegian gangsters who look set to move on Edinburgh. Cafferty, the young Edinburgh gangster Darryl Christie, and the Glasgow gang are all looking over their shoulders at each other and at the police. Cafferty is the one who recognises the history behind the vendetta against him and a few other survivors of a disastrous event thirty years earlier.

== Themes ==
The novel deals with themes of father-son relationships and their rivalries, as portrayed by the relationship between Rebus and Fox.

== Reception ==
Publishers Weekly felt that the novel was "uneven", and criticized the character of Fox as "milquetoast", but the book was praised by Melanie McGrath in The Guardian as "a twisty, darkly topical and immaculately executed tale," and Kirkus Reviews says that although the plot is a slow-burning one, "it's well worth the wait to see how the latest entry in this celebrated series fits all the pieces together."
