= Knots and Crosses =

1987 novel by Ian Rankin

- First UK edition
- Author: Ian Rankin
- Language: English
- Series: Inspector Rebus
- Genre: Detective fiction
- Set in: Edinburgh and Fife, 1985
- Publisher: The Bodley Head
- Publication date: 1987
- Publication place: Scotland
- Media type: Print (hardback & paperback)
- Pages: 168 pp
- ISBN: 0-3703-1057-8
- OCLC: 60611210
- Dewey Decimal: 823.914
- LC Class: PR6068 .A57
- Followed by: Hide and Seek

Knots and Crosses (also written Knots & Crosses) is a 1987 crime novel by Ian Rankin. It is the first of the Inspector Rebus novels. It was written while Rankin was a postgraduate student at the University of Edinburgh. In the introduction to this novel, Rankin states that Rebus lives directly opposite the window in Marchmont from which he himself looked out while writing the book.

== Plot ==
1985. Edinburgh has been shocked by the abduction and subsequent strangling of two young girls. Journalist Jim Stevens runs his own investigation, and has uncovered Michael Rebus's drug dealing. He suspects that his brother John, a Lothian and Borders Police officer, knows or even supports his brother's illegal activities.

John Rebus is meanwhile assigned to the investigative team. The investigation remains without success, and eventually two more girls disappear. Throughout the case, John is haunted by his past in the SAS. Then his former wife is attacked and his daughter abducted. Only when he is hypnotized by his brother is he able to share his past with him and his colleague and lover Gill Templer. Taking hints from seemingly cryptic anonymous letters, John connects the murders to his own military past. Relieved from his duty because of the personal involvement, he decides to find and face his enemy.

== Characters and notes ==
- Detective Sergeant John Rebus – lead character, hard drinking, Scottish detective with a troubled past
- Michael Rebus – John's younger brother, rich from following his father's career in stage hypnotism, with a few secrets to hide
- Samantha – John Rebus' daughter
- Detective Inspector Gill Templer – the Press Liaison officer on the abduction case, and Rebus' on-off love interest
- Jim Stevens – investigative journalist

== Connections to other Rankin books ==
- Jim Stevens reappears in Rankin's third book, Watchman, following his move to London at the end of Knots; he appears again in the tenth novel, Dead Souls, where he is murdered.
- An alternative version of Gordon Reeve, Rebus' partner in SAS training, was the protagonist of Blood Hunt, the last book Rankin wrote under his "Jack Harvey" alias: he stated on his website that this was to give it a "sense of 'closure'".

== Writing Knots and Crosses ==
In the Exile on Princes Street foreword to Rebus: The Early Years, Rankin says he wrote this book shortly after giving his father a James Kelman book (the type of book he was studying at the time) and being shocked when his father said it wasn't "written in English" and had no story; Rankin says this made him rethink what type of writer he wanted to be. He wrote Knots with the idea of updating Robert Louis Stevenson's Dr. Jekyll and Mr. Hyde into then-modern Edinburgh, with Rebus as the Jekyll figure (the book implies for a while that Rebus himself is unwittingly the killer) and he put Rebus in the same road, Arden Street, that he himself was living in. He states he was shocked to find out later that everyone thought he'd written a crime book, as he was unfamiliar with the genre. In an interview with The Guardian, he speaks of the stylistic details he would have liked to change, saying: "I was a young man in love with language, striving for a voice and sometimes overreaching."

== Reception ==
Though the novel was not much reviewed when it first came out, it was viewed as promising, with Kirkus Reviews commenting: "Solidly drawn characters, keen psychological insights and an intriguing, well-knit plot—along with a rather florid but individual writing style—make Rankin a newcomer to watch."
