= Standing in Another Man's Grave =

2012 novel by Ian Rankin

- First edition
- Author: Ian Rankin
- Language: English
- Series: Inspector Rebus
- Genre: Detective fiction
- Publisher: Orion Books
- Publication date: 2012
- Publication place: Scotland
- Media type: Print
- Pages: 432
- ISBN: 1409109402
- OCLC: 60794519
- Preceded by: Exit Music
- Followed by: Saints of the Shadow Bible

Standing in Another Man's Grave is the eighteenth instalment in the bestselling Inspector Rebus series of crime novels, published in 2012. The title of the book is a mondegreen, Rankin having misheard the Scottish singer songwriter Jackie Leven singing "Standing in Another Man's Rain", which mistake he gives to Rebus. Excerpts from Leven's songs appear with each division of the book.

== Plot summary ==
Having been retired from the police for five years, Rebus continues to investigate as part of the cold cases unit. The mother of a missing girl enlists his help in finding out what happened to her daughter, leading Rebus to uncover the truth about a series of seemingly unconnected disappearances stretching back to the millennium. He is seconded to the CID, where the most recent case is being handled by DI Siobhan Clarke and her unit. The serial killer has found his victims on the A9 highway and Rebus travels to Pitlochry and Inverness several times, driving as far north as his daughter Samantha's home.

In Edinburgh, Rebus continues to associate with the gangster 'Big Ger' Cafferty and meets two younger gangsters who are related to the missing girl. His activities are known to Malcolm Fox, who believes that he can take Rebus down for corruption. However, the constant reorganization of the Scottish police structures mean that Rebus loses his official position by the end of the novel.

== Reception ==
Jake Kerridge, writing in The Telegraph, gave the novel four stars out of five and concurs with Alison Flood (The Guardian) that Detective Inspector Malcolm Fox, who was in the two novels before this one, is a poor character when up against Rebus, which he is frequently in this book.

The Metro gave the book two stars out of five, calling it "Mediocre at best" and noted that the door remains open for another Rebus novel; "Let's hope it's better than this one." Similarly, John Dugdale, writing in The Sunday Times, said that "Rebus’s comeback novel is hence a bewildering mixture of good and bad, interlacing an impeccably crafted whodunnit."
