= Hide and Seek (Rankin novel) =

1991 novel by Ian Rankin

- First edition
- Author: Ian Rankin
- Language: English
- Genre: Detective fiction
- Set in: Edinburgh
- Publisher: Barrie & Jenkins
- Publication date: 1991
- Publication place: Scotland
- Media type: Print (hardback & paperback)
- Pages: 210 pp
- ISBN: 0-7126-3896-2
- OCLC: 40815552
- Preceded by: Knots and Crosses
- Followed by: Tooth and Nail

Hide and Seek is a 1991 crime novel by Ian Rankin. It is the second of the Inspector Rebus novels. This novel is not to be confused with James Patterson's 1996 novel Hide and Seek.

== Plot summary ==
Detective Inspector John Rebus finds the body of a drug addict in an Edinburgh squat, apparently dead of an overdose, but laid out cross-like on the floor, between two burned-down candles, with a five-pointed star painted on the wall above. Some of his colleagues are inclined to categorise it as the routine death of a "junkie", but Rebus is perturbed by some unusual facts of the case: a full package of heroin in the dead man's room, and some mysterious bruises on his face and body.

As Rebus feels that this case looks increasingly like a murder, he begins to investigate. As part of this investigation, Rebus finds a young woman named Tracy who knew the dead man and heard his last words: "Hide! Hide!"

It emerges that the dead man took and hid some sensitive photos in a specialist private members' club named Hyde's, where highly connected people in society watch illegal boxing matches. Rebus is able to arrest Hyde's owner and several high-profile members, but to his disgust all die suspicious deaths while imprisoned: the powers-that-be are covering it up to prevent scandal.

== Connections to other Rankin books ==
- Rian, a character who appears in Rankin's first novel, The Flood, reappears in this book.
- Rebus remembers journalist Jim Stevens from Knots and Crosses, and that he has since moved to London and married a girl "half his age" - a reference to Stevens in Watchman.
- When encountering a rentboy, Rebus has a brief flashback to Gordon Reeve from Knots and Crosses.
- Recurring characters Brian Holmes, a fellow detective, and Superintendent "Farmer" Watson first appear here.

== Writing Hide and Seek ==
In the Exile on Princes Street foreword to Rebus: The Early Years, Rankin says this was his second attempt at updating Robert Louis Stevenson's Dr. Jekyll and Mr. Hyde into then-modern Edinburgh ("one reviewer 'got it'"), and with this book he began to like Rebus as a character and thought he could use him as a recurring mouthpiece for stories about his views on Scotland.

He also noted that, shortly after moving to London, there was a real-life case of male prostitutes bribing lawyers and judges, similar to some parts of the book: "questions were asked in parliament" and two lawyers began to investigate the police investigation. "To everyone's surprise, this inquiry found that the allegations were false. Police officers involved in the case found themselves demoted..."

== Reception ==
In 2020 Craig Robertson in The Guardian listed Hide and Seek among the top 10 Scottish crime novels.
