= Resurrection Men =

2002 novel by Ian Rankin

- First edition
- Author: Ian Rankin
- Language: English
- Series: Inspector Rebus
- Genre: Detective fiction
- Publisher: Orion Books
- Publication date: 2002
- Publication place: Scotland
- Media type: Print (hardback & paperback)
- Pages: 440 pp
- ISBN: 0-7528-2131-8
- OCLC: 50215352
- Preceded by: The Falls
- Followed by: A Question of Blood

Resurrection Men is a 2002 novel by Ian Rankin. It is the thirteenth of the Inspector Rebus novels.

It won the Edgar Award for Best Novel in 2004.

== Plot summary ==
Detective Inspector John Rebus has been sent to Tulliallan, the Scottish Police College, for 'retraining', as part of a small group of senior officers who have become undisciplined. They are "the Resurrection Men," whose careers need to be resuscitated long enough for them to earn their pensions. Rebus has officially been sent to Tulliallan for throwing a cup of tea at DCS Gill Templer, but in fact he is working undercover on behalf of the Chief Constable to learn about a suspected 1994 theft by a group of the senior officers attending the course. To complicate things further, the officers in the course are assigned the unsolved 1995 case of the murder of a Glasgow gangster, a case originally investigated by one of their number, and about which Rebus knows all too much. While investigating his fellow officers for a past crime, he now fears that they will expose his own secrets.

Back at St Leonard's police station, DS Siobhan Clarke and the other officers are pursuing a murder inquiry, the brutal death of an Edinburgh art dealer named Marber. Clues involve a stolen painting by Jack Vettriano, and a large disbursement to a painter who had been claiming Marber was cheating artists and clients. The case also involves a young prostitute for whom Marber was providing a home. DS Clarke suspects Edinburgh gangster 'Big Ger' Cafferty of owning the spa where the prostitute works, the cab company that Marber used on the night of his death, and possibly a mysterious stash of paintings purchased from Marber a few years earlier. When the stolen painting turns up in one suspect's garden shed, he is arrested, but Clarke remains skeptical and continues to pursue other avenues of inquiry.

Meanwhile, the Scottish Crime and Drug Enforcement Agency asks Rebus to act as a go-between with the Weasel, Big Ger's right-hand man. Rebus does not try too hard to persuade the Weasel to turn Cafferty over. However, he gets an idea about planning a heist of a secret trove of SDEA drugs; by involving the suspected police officers, he hopes to provoke them to reveal their earlier activities.

While Clarke turns out to be on the wrong track, and Rebus makes a mess of his undercover mission, they work as partners to discover Marber's murderer and his connection with the 1994 theft by the police officers.

The title, besides the explanation in the book itself, is a reference to the body-snatchers of the 19th century, who were known as 'resurrectionists' or 'resurrection men'. Rebus himself, in the preceding novel, The Falls, was preoccupied with Burke and Hare, who posed as grave-robbers and are often identified as 'resurrection men.'

== Reception ==
The novel was a bestseller and won the Edgar Award for Best Novel in 2004. It received positive reviews, though The Guardian compared it somewhat unfavourably with earlier novels, saying: "the rapid movement of the plot leaves little time for development of character," and implying that the franchise was getting tired. Publishers Weekly considered it too lengthy, but said: "This isn't one of Rankin's top efforts, but even coasting, he leaves most police procedurals at the gate."

== TV adaptation ==
Resurrection Men was the first episode in the fourth Rebus television series, starring Ken Stott, airing in 2007.
