= Saints of the Shadow Bible =

2013 crime novel by Ian Rankin

- First edition
- Author: Ian Rankin
- Language: English
- Series: Inspector Rebus
- Genre: Detective fiction
- Publisher: Orion Books
- Publication date: 7 November 2013
- Publication place: Scotland
- Media type: Print
- Pages: 336
- ISBN: 1409144747
- OCLC: 60794519
- Preceded by: Standing in Another Man's Grave
- Followed by: Even Dogs in the Wild

Saints of the Shadow Bible is the nineteenth instalment in the bestselling Inspector Rebus series of crime novels, published in 2013. Like the preceding Rebus novel, this one draws its title from a Jackie Leven lyric.

== Plot ==
The investigations in the novel take place in February or March 2013 against the background of the dissolution of regional police forces as they are merged into Police Scotland. Malcolm Fox’s unit, the “Complaints,” is disappearing, and he undertakes an investigation on behalf of the Solicitor General in the hopes of finding a place in the new organization. DI Siobhan Clarke is stationed at Gayfield Square, but follows important cases to Torphichen and Wester Hailes police stations. John Rebus has succeeded in rejoining the CID, albeit as a Detective Sergeant instead of a Detective Inspector. He works with both Clarke and Fox, but is primarily investigating a long-defunct police station, Summerhall, where he was assigned in 1982 as a newly-minted detective.

Also relevant to the cases is the upcoming 2014 Scottish independence referendum; a Justice Minister, whose death Clarke is investigating, is a figurehead for the Yes campaign, while Rebus’s Summerhall colleague Gilmour, Fox’s target, is a prominent No supporter. This recalls the 2000 Rebus novel, Set in Darkness, set in the midst of the first elections to the new Scottish Parliament.

Clarke and Rebus’s apparently trivial investigation of a university student’s car crash becomes complicated when the student’s boyfriend’s father, the Justice Minister, is found dead in his own home. Meanwhile, Rebus is invited by Fox to help with the opening of a very cold case involving the Summerhall policemen, who called themselves “Saints of the Shadow Bible.” The surviving Saints want Rebus to ensure that Fox does not disrupt their lives; Fox hopes Rebus will implicate himself; Rebus wants to find out more about the secrets he only glimpsed thirty years earlier. Rebus ends up using his confrontational techniques (intimidation and threats, recruiting snitches, bargaining with gangsters) to assist both Clarke and Fox. The three detectives come to respect each other.

== "Dead and Buried" (short story) ==
This short story, published in The Beat Goes On (short story collection) (2014), is set during Rebus’s stint at Summerhall (i.e. in 1982 or ’83). Stefan Gilmour, the DI, tests Rebus by allowing him to investigate a watch buried with a man named Joseph Blay, who was hanged for murder in 1963. Rebus finds that Gilmour's dead hero, DI Charlie Cruikshank, had suppressed evidence that could have exonerated Blay. Rebus tells Gilmour that he will not take the matter to "The Complaints", as "what good would that do?". Gilmour says, "Welcome to the Saints of the Shadow Bible, John." After a moment's hesitation, Rebus returns his handshake.
