= The Naming of the Dead =

2006 crime novel by Ian Rankin

- First edition
- Author: Ian Rankin
- Language: English
- Series: Inspector Rebus
- Genre: Detective fiction
- Publisher: Orion Books
- Publication date: 2006
- Publication place: Scotland
- Media type: Print
- Pages: 416 pages
- ISBN: 0-7528-6858-6
- OCLC: 69022319
- Preceded by: Fleshmarket Close
- Followed by: Exit Music

The Naming of the Dead is a crime novel by Ian Rankin. It is the sixteenth of the Inspector Rebus novels. It is set in Edinburgh in July 2005, in the week of the G8 summit in Gleneagles.

== Plot summary ==
The book opens with Detective Inspector John Rebus attending the funeral of his brother Michael, who has died suddenly from a stroke. The parents of Detective Sergeant Siobhan Clarke arrive in Edinburgh as part of the protests, demonstrations, and scuffles that surrounded the G8 summit at Gleneagles, keeping the police busy. Clarke defied her parents by becoming a police officer; she now wants to feel like a daughter.

Rebus is nearing retirement ("nobody would blame you for coasting"), and becomes sidelined until the apparent suicide of MP Ben Webster occurs at a high-level meeting in Edinburgh Castle. It emerges that Webster was campaigning against the arms trade, and Richard Pennen of Pennen Industries, a dealer in weapons technology, comes under suspicion.

At the same time, a serial killer seems to be targeting former offenders, helped by a website set up by the family of a victim. Clues have been deliberately left at Clootie Well (duplicated from the Black Isle to Auchterarder for the purposes of the plot), a place where items of clothing are traditionally left for luck.

Siobhan Clarke is placed in charge of the investigation, although she is outranked by Rebus, and finds herself having to collaborate with Edinburgh gangster Morris Cafferty (for whom one of the victims was working as a bouncer) in hunting down the identity of the riot policeman who apparently assaulted her mother at a demonstration. Cafferty is also getting older, though his insecurity is balanced somewhat by his having had a biography ghost-written by local journalist Mairie Henderson. She is enlisted by Rebus and Clarke to help solve the crimes.

The new Chief Constable of Lothian and Borders Police, James Corbyn, is keen to put any potential controversy from the investigation on hold until the focus of the world's media has moved on. He puts Rebus and Clarke under suspension when they disobey him and they turn to Ellen Wylie for help.

David Steelforth, the London-based Special Branch (SO12) Commander who is overseeing the policing of the G8 summit, seems to be holding back Rebus' work at every turn. Rebus and Clarke blow the cover of one of his agents. Former preacher Councillor Gareth Tench seems to Rebus to be involved due to his apparent closeness to one of the suspects, Niddrie thug Keith Carberry.

== Background ==
Rebus and Clarke pursue their investigation against the background of the 31st G8 summit, seen from both the police side and that of the protestors; among the events referred to are the epic and peaceful Make Poverty History march, the 7/7 London bombings, the 2012 Olympic bid and George W. Bush falling off his bicycle whilst waving at police officers: Clarke also attends two concerts, the Live8 Final Push and the 2005 T in the Park. There are also references in the book to the TV series Columbo, of which Rankin is a fan.

== Themes ==
The novel deals with themes of personal responsibility against the political background. The author has stated in interview: "it's asking does the individual make a difference in this huge political world?"

The title refers to: the ceremony Clarke's ageing left-wing parents attend, where the names of a sampling of the dead from the Iraq War are read out; the list of victims created by Rebus and Clarke as they try to unravel the crime; and also to John Rebus' evocation of grief in naming the many of his own friends and family who have died in the course of his life. Both familial and professional relationships are important, as Rebus struggles to process the death of his brother and Clarke struggles with her relationship with her parents. By the end of the book, Clarke realises that she has grown closer than ever to understanding Rebus:

"It's not enough, is it?" she repeated. "Just...symbolic...because there's nothing else you can do."
"What are you talking about?" he asked, with a smile.
"The naming of the dead," she told him, resting her head against his shoulder. (p.410.)

She increasingly fears that she is becoming more like him:

"obsessed and sidelined, thrawn and distrusted. Rebus had lost family and friends. When he went out drinking, he did so on his own, standing quietly at the bar, facing the row of optics."

== Reception ==
The book was enthusiastically received, with The Guardian praising the humour and depth of characterization. The Scotsman called it: "Ian Rankin's finest novel... more than a crime novel", comparing Rebus to Raymond Chandler's fictional detective Philip Marlowe and describing the book as: "dark, murky and less immediate than his other novels, but still zinging with wit and his inimitable gift for plot. His richest and most complex work to date". However, Publishers Weekly called it "overly complex," and The Independent felt it lacked an emotional core, commenting that "it feels as if written on the hoof by someone running round with a microphone, collecting soundbites of humour, fury and moral angst – like Dickens on speed, highly enjoyable, but ultimately breathless."
