= A Question of Blood =

2003 crime novel by Ian Rankin

- First edition
- Author: Ian Rankin
- Language: English
- Series: Inspector Rebus
- Genre: Detective fiction
- Publisher: Orion Books
- Publication date: 2003
- Publication place: Scotland
- Media type: Print (hardback & paperback)
- Pages: 360 pp
- ISBN: 0-7528-5110-1
- OCLC: 59272663
- Preceded by: Resurrection Men
- Followed by: Fleshmarket Close

A Question of Blood is a 2003 crime novel by Ian Rankin. It is the fourteenth of the Inspector Rebus novels.

The book was a finalist for the Los Angeles Times Book Prize for Mystery/Thriller.

== Background ==
The novel refers to a number of real-life events, having been written in the aftermath of the Dunblane massacre, and also refers to the Lockerbie bombing and the crashing of a military helicopter on Jura.

== Plot summary ==
A Question of Blood begins with DI John Rebus facing trouble following the death in a house fire of a petty criminal who had been stalking DS Siobhan Clarke. Rebus, who has suffered burns to his hands, is known to have been at the stalker's house that night, but maintains that he left the man unharmed and that his injuries were sustained later, at home.

Meanwhile, another incident emerges: that of the shooting of three teenagers at a private school, apparently by an ex-soldier who subsequently shot himself. The facts seem straightforward, and the only mysteries are the motive and the origin of the gun. Investigating the case, Rebus antagonises the father of the surviving boy, an aggressive local MP who dislikes the police and is trying to make political capital out of the shooting. He also meets his long-lost cousin, whose son was one of the killer's victims and whose daughter is now being sucked into the MP's campaign. He and Clarke try to trace the gun to a local gangster, and continue on the case when Rebus is officially suspended on suspicion of murdering Clarke's stalker. Two secretive security service personnel appear and begin asking awkward questions, and Rebus traces their interest to the gunman's involvement in a classified military helicopter crash on Jura years before. Drugs are found on his boat, and they discover that he had secrets and some unusual friendships, including with local teenagers and an ex-RAF pilot. However, the motive for the shooting remains unclear, and Rebus begins to wonder whether they have the true version of events after all.

Forensic evidence confirms his suspicions; the MP's son turns out to be lying. He killed his fellow-students himself, driven by motives including an angry relationship with his MP father, who faces personal and political ruin because of his son's actions. With the shooting resolved, the complex web linking many of those they have been investigating becomes clear to Rebus and Clarke: there has been drug-smuggling and money-laundering, the illegal reactivation of weapons, and the theft of diamonds intended to fund a covert government deal with Irish paramilitaries. The gangster who supplies guns was involved, and is found to be the real killer of Clarke's stalker, clearing Rebus of suspicion. Clarke confronts the key drug smuggler, who attacks her, escapes, and then crashes his light aircraft. A distraught Rebus witnesses the crash and assumes for a time that Clarke was on board and is dead.

The case over, Rebus gets drunk. He revisits the scalding of his hands, and the reader learns that the accident happened at home during a blackout after his previous drinking bout, explaining why he has avoided alcohol during the events of the novel. Recent events make him reassess his life and relationships, and he plans to try to repair some of his broken family ties. Meanwhile, the MP hires a lawyer and proposes to his son that if he retracts his confession, they will try to destroy the case against him on technical grounds based on Rebus's irregular conduct, suspension, and family links to the case. Whether he succeeds is not revealed.

== Reception ==
The novel was well-received, reaching the top of the UK charts and earning a starred review from Publishers Weekly, which called Rebus "a brilliantly conceived hero who is all too aware of his own shortcomings," although Kirkus Reviews called it "a notch below quintessential Rankin," citing Rebus' less active role in the novel, whilst praising the character of Siobhan Clarke.
