= Black & Blue (Rankin novel) =

Novel by Ian Rankin

- First edition
- Author: Ian Rankin
- Language: English
- Series: Inspector Rebus
- Genre: Detective novel
- Publisher: Orion Books
- Publication date: 1997
- Publication place: Scotland
- Media type: Print (hardback & paperback)
- Pages: 320 pages
- ISBN: 0-7528-0514-2
- OCLC: 39741138
- Preceded by: Let It Bleed
- Followed by: The Hanging Garden

Black & Blue is a 1997 crime novel by Ian Rankin. The eighth of the Inspector Rebus novels, it was the first to be adapted in the Rebus television series starring John Hannah, airing in 2000.

It won the Crime Writers' Association Gold Dagger Award for fiction.

== Background ==
Black & Blue is considered by the author to be his breakthrough novel. The previous books were well-reviewed, but sales had continued to be modest. Writing was now his main income; he and his wife had two young sons, one of whom had been diagnosed with special needs. Rankin says of this period in his career:

I was angry and bewildered, suffering panic attacks and wondering if I was going to have to jack it all in and get a proper job. Instead, I channelled everything into Black and Blue. I had been reading a lot of James Ellroy, and it shows. I turned to his staccato style, and decided that, like him, I could people my world with real crimes, real villains and real mysteries. I had ended my apprenticeship and felt I knew the inside of John Rebus’s head, knew what made him tick.

Rankin also says that Black & Blue is the first novel in which he consciously added a large amount of (sometimes invented) slang, for instance, "biscuit tin," meaning a police interrogation room, and "woolly suit," meaning a police constable.

== Plot summary ==
Detective Inspector John Rebus is working on four cases at once trying to catch a killer he suspects of being the infamous Bible John. He has to do it while under an internal inquiry led by a man he has accused of taking bribes from Glasgow's "Mr Big". TV journalists are meanwhile investigating Rebus over a miscarriage of justice. Rebus travels between Edinburgh, Glasgow and Aberdeen and then on to Shetland and the North Sea.

== Full summary ==
Set in Scotland around the mid-1990s, Black & Blue focuses on Detective Inspector Rebus. Transferred to Craigmillar, Rebus is investigating the Johnny Bible case. (The spree of recent killings bears a striking similarity to the factual "Bible John" case of the late 1960s.) Rebus resolves an ambiguous incident with his colleague Brian Holmes, regarding the alleged assault on the criminal Mental Minto. He becomes involved in investigating the brutal death of Allan Mitchison. At home, Rebus is fascinated by the Bible John killings, and studies them off-duty through old newspapers and reports. Rebus had also worked on the Spaven case with a former boss, Geddes; despite having arrested Spaven and found him with the victim's handbag, Rebus (and the press) are not convinced that the evidence wasn't planted. Spaven had continued to protest his innocence, including in a best-selling biography, before committing suicide in prison.

Rebus starts investigating Mitchison's death, while assigning Holmes to research Geddes’ notes in the Spaven case, to return the favour for resolving the earlier incident with Minto. Suspecting Tony El of murdering Mitchison, Rebus puts out his description before heading to Partick to see Joseph Toal, a local crime boss who used to employ Tony El.

The book switches to Bible John's viewpoint, who arrives in Scotland, apparently to pursue Johnny Bible, whom he calls "the Upstart". Investigating libraries, Bible John starts tracing anyone who has researched him. In Partick with CI Ancram and an old friend, DI Jack Morton, Rebus continues investigating Johnny Bible, and calls on his relationship with Cafferty, a gang lord in Edinburgh now behind bars. Because of his respect for Rebus despite his being a police officer, Cafferty arranges a meeting for him with Uncle Joe, where Rebus learns that Tony El is no longer working for Uncle Joe and apparently headed south. After a dispute with Ancram, Rebus heads back home. After meeting with Gill Templer, Rebus attempts to visit one of his colleague's snitches, only to find him dead in the canal.

In an attempt to satisfy the press, the police open an inquiry into the Spaven case, and bring Rebus in as he is the only surviving person to have been closely involved. Attempting to stall talking to them, Rebus heads to Aberdeen, meeting DS Lumsden and asking about the Tony El/Mitchison case. After meeting Minchell and Major Weir, Rebus accompanies Minchell to the North Sea Conference where, after getting past the protesters, he meets an oil executive called Ryan Slocum. The latter is talking about the oil industry's being bought up by United States interests.

Rebus and Lumsden later go for dinner, also visiting the scene where one of Johnny Bible's victims was killed. Later that night after they separate, Lumsden calls Rebus to tell him that Tony El has apparently committed suicide. After learning that Tony El supposedly used a Stanley knife to slash his wrists, Rebus disagrees with the suicide conclusion. Bible John, meanwhile, has discovered that both the Upstart and Rebus have been researching him.

Rebus flies to Shetland, meeting Major Weir on the way. He finds out from Mitchison's work mates that he had been interested in ecology, and that a close friend has gone missing. Later at Burke's Club, Rebus talks to Stemmons, the manager, learning nothing, but finds Stanley and Eve in the club. On the way home, two men attack him as a warning, but by who?

Rebus is accompanied by Lumsden on a flight to Bannock, where they find protesters handcuffed to the oil rig's railings. After learning that Mitchison hosted the Save Our Oceans charity concert, Rebus heads back to Aberdeen, where he is picked up by a couple of "woolly suits". He is questioned by Ancram and CI Grogan, as a woman was killed in the vicinity where Rebus was the previous night. Learning that the latest victim accompanied Fletcher to Burke's Club, Rebus phones Grogan to tell him. In lieu of Rebus' being suspended, he has to accept the oversight of Jack. Bible John wrestles with the idea of tipping off the police about his own findings, but decides to deal with the Upstart himself.

Rebus's blood, fingerprints and DNA are taken for the police, and he is interviewed by Ancram re the Spaven case. Afterward, Rebus and Jack paint Rebus's flat, after finding the lock forced open but nothing taken. Rebus notes his Bible John clippings have been sifted through. Holmes recommends Rebus talk to Mick Hine, the last man to see Spaven alive. Doing so, Rebus finds that Spaven was kind to his cellmate, and kept protesting his innocence. After brawling with Jack to release tension, Rebus visits Nell, attempting to encourage her to stay with Holmes.

Rebus learns that Shankley, a small-time criminal in Glasgow, has been boasting of a windfall. Chasing him down, Rebus learns that he worked with Tony El to attack Mitchison, and that they both were hired by a mysterious Mr. H. With Jack's encouragement, Rebus finally gives up alcohol and cigarettes. Rebus begins to tie all the Johnny Bible killings to the oil industry, suspecting that he may well be an oilman. Rebus meets Marie, where she hands over information she has dug up on Weir; unaware that he is being watched by Bible John. The reader learns that Bible John broke into Rebus's flat, looking for his business card, which he gave Rebus before learning of his work with the police.

After being interviewed again by Ancram. Rebus heads back to Glasgow. Phoning Stanley, he convinces him and Eve to come into the station under aliases, and leads him into confessing to orchestrating the murder of Mitchison, making possible his arrest. Talking to Siobhan, Rebus discovers that Johnny Bible had been using a pseudonym to research his predecessor; while Bible John closes in on the Upstart, getting closer and closer to his identity.

Rebus and Jack track down Jake's girlfriend, who leads them to his hiding place on an island. He had feared that Mitchison's killers would be after him. They find that Mitchison had been seeing another of the protesters, who turns out to be Major Weir's daughter. Rebus heads back to Burke's Club, but is jumped by the co-owner Fuller and Stemmons; during their torture of him, he realises that the elusive Mr. H is Haydn Fletcher. Before Fuller can kill him, Rebus breaks free and escapes. Meanwhile, posing as a police officer, Bible John narrows his own list of suspects down to two.

Forensics reveal that Rebus's DNA doesn't match that at the Spaven crime scene, ending the inquiry. Geddes' daughter sends Rebus a note from her father, written before his death. Geddes wrote that he had served in the army with Spaven, where he suspected him of murdering a prostitute in Kampong. Later, in the Bible John inquiry, Geddes was on the tail of a man called Ray Sloane, but he got away due to Spaven's lack of co-operation. Geddes also swears that he didn't plant the handbag.

Rebus gives the letter to Ancram, and with Siobhan's help, determines that Johnny Bible is Martin Davidson. The police raid his house, only to find that he was killed by Bible John. Items in the house which he took from his victims confirm that Johnny Bible was Davidson.

During the party at CID afterwards, Rebus realises that Ryan Slocum and Bible John are the same person. He goes to Slocum's home, to find that he has disappeared. His wife tells Rebus that it was not a business trip, and his trunk was taken from the loft. The reader is told the trunk was full of the ‘souvenirs’ he took from his victims. The book ends with Holmes leaving the force, and Rebus throwing out his Bible John clippings.

== Allusions ==
- The title refers to the Rolling Stones album Black and Blue. :Black and blue" is also another name for bruising; Rebus gets roughed up several times during the novel.
- As Rankin states in the foreword to the novel, the title also alludes to oil and policemen: black for the oil and blue for the cops.
- Rankin presents a fictional version of the Dancing Pigs, a punk band for which he sang when he was 19. They lasted only a year and were not very successful. He states that he especially enjoyed making them successful in this novel.

== Reception ==
The novel was well-received: Kirkus Reviews praised Rankin's "dexterity" as well as his "poet's grace," and Publishers Weekly called it: "rich in character and incident."

It won the Crime Writers' Association's Gold Dagger award
