= Dead Souls (Rankin novel) =

1999 novel by Ian Rankin

- First edition
- Author: Ian Rankin
- Language: English
- Series: Inspector Rebus
- Genre: Detective fiction
- Publisher: Orion Books
- Publication date: 1999
- Publication place: Scotland
- Media type: Print (hardback & paperback)
- Pages: 406 pages
- ISBN: 0-7528-0723-4
- OCLC: 60611208
- Preceded by: The Hanging Garden
- Followed by: Set in Darkness

Dead Souls is a 1999 crime novel by Ian Rankin, the tenth of his novels featuring Inspector Rebus.

The title refers both to Joy Division's song "Dead Souls" and to the 1842 Nikolai Gogol novel Dead Souls; quotes from the latter appear at the beginnings of the two divisions of the book.

The novel won the French Grand Prix de Littérature Policière upon its publication there in 2005.

== Background ==
Dead Souls grew from themes and characters in a previously-written novella, Death Is Not The End, which was later published as a standalone.

== Plot summary ==
While investigating a poisoner at Edinburgh Zoo, Detective Inspector John Rebus sees Darren Rough, a known paedophile, seemingly photographing children and decides to 'out' the man, in spite of assurances that he wants to reform. Later Rebus tries to help Darren, thinking better of his action, but is unable to stop him being murdered.

Meanwhile, Rebus has been assigned to keep a watch on Cary Oakes, a convicted killer back from the US who, having served his time in prison, has come to Edinburgh to settle accounts from his past. His experience with both Rough and Oakes makes Rebus think out his prejudices and question how much a person is the product of his inherited nature, and how much nurture shapes that character. He has to confront this once again when he discovers that the reason behind the suicide of his police colleague Jim Margolies was fear that he was becoming like his incestuous father. Rebus also has to face up to his own past and the route he took to escape it when his friend Brian Mee and former girlfriend Janice approach him to help find their son Damon, who has gone missing.

His search for answers to all his questions involves him in discovering how implicated a respected doctor had been in protecting two paedophiles then on trial for conspiring to abuse children in care homes. Darren Rough had, in fact, been brought to Edinburgh to testify against them. And while investigating Damon Mee's last appearance at a party held by Ama and Nichol Petrie, the children of a high-profile judge, he finds out that the son is a cross-dresser and had brought Damon to the party while in his female role.

Another antagonist from Rebus’ past, the journalist Jim Stevens, is attempting to make a come-back by arranging an exclusive interview with Cary Oakes. The story he gets is sheer rubbish, since Oakes is an arch-manipulator who is using Stevens as a smokescreen. Realising this, Stevens joins forces with Rebus in trying to find out what Oakes’ real object is in Edinburgh. When he succeeds, Oakes stabs him to death and then goes after Rebus. But Oakes has consistently underestimated Rebus, who kicks him into the path of a speeding car while he is intent on his attack.

Those left alive must continue to cope with their problems. Knowing some answers does not really resolve the divisions and imperfections in society which it is the job of Rebus and his colleagues to police.

== Television adaptation ==
Dead Souls was adapted as the third episode in the Rebus television series, airing in 2001. In this there were significant plot differences from the novel. These concern the fate of the missing person, the nature of the relationship between Rebus and his ex-girlfriend, and the character of her husband.

== Reception ==
The novel was well-received, with Kirkus Reviews calling it "compelling", and with Publishers Weekly praising "Rankin's drum-tight characterization of Rebus as a man deeply shaken in his convictions, but unwilling to fall apart."
