= Watchman (novel) =

1988 crime novel by Ian Rankin

- First edition
- Author: Ian Rankin
- Language: English
- Genre: Thriller
- Publisher: Bodley Head
- Publication date: 1988
- Publication place: Scotland
- Media type: Print (hardcover)
- Pages: 224 pp
- ISBN: 0-370-31208-2
- OCLC: 17439591

Watchman is a 1988 novel written by Ian Rankin, and is one of the author's earliest works. Originally published in 1988, it was reissued with a new introduction by Rankin in 2004.

It also exists as an audiobook, read by Roger Allam.

== Plot summary ==
The book tells the story of Miles Flint, a surveillance officer who works for MI5.

After two high-profile operations involving Flint are compromised with deadly consequences, he is sent to Belfast to witness what he believes is going to be the arrest of some Provisional Irish Republican Army men. However, after accompanying the security forces on their mission, he discovers that what has actually been planned is the assassination of the Irishmen – and with Flint having come along for the ride, he suddenly realises that his own life is at risk.

As the killings are about to be carried out, Flint stages a daring escape with the aid of one of the Irishmen, Will Collins. Then, on the run, and playing a deadly game of cat and mouse with his own side, Flint and Collins begin to piece together a lethal conspiracy which they ultimately discover goes right to the very core of the British Government.

== Reception ==
Kirkus Reviews called it: "a gritty appraisal of the bomb-wielding miasma of the 1980s and a highly readable explanation of the demons that drive zealots to switch sides."

== Connections to other Rankin books ==
- Journalist Jim Stevens who appears in this book, first appeared in Knots and Crosses, the first Inspector Rebus book, which ended with him leaving Edinburgh for London; he returned to Scotland in this book and future Rebus books.

== Release details ==
- 1988, UK, Bodley Head (ISBN 0370312082), pub. date 9 June 1988, hardback (first edition)
- 2003, UK, Orion (ISBN 978-0-7528-6033-6), hardcover (revised edition, with an introduction by the author)
- 2004, UK, Orion (ISBN 0-75285-915-3), pub. date 2 September 2004, paperback (revised edition)
