= Rebus: A Game Called Malice =

- Original language: English
- Written by: Ian Rankin; Simon Reade
- Series: Inspector Rebus
- Genre: Thriller
- Setting: Edinburgh

Premiere
- Date: 2 February 2023
- Place: Queen's Theatre, Hornchurch

Rebus: A Game Called Malice is a 2023 play written by Sir Ian Rankin and Simon Reade. It is the second play by Rankin to feature his signature character John Rebus, after Rebus: Long Shadows. Like its predecessor, it features an original plot using the author's literary characters.

The play premiered at the Queen's Theatre, Hornchurch on February 2, 2023.

== Plot ==
Ex-policeman John Rebus is embroiled in a web of secrets while playing a murder mystery game at a dinner party.

== Production ==
The 2023 premiere was at the Queen's Theatre, with a cast led by John Michie. Robin Lefevre, who had helmed the original production of Rebus: Long Shadows, returned to direct.

The following year, a UK tour ran from August 29 to November 30. Gray O'Brien assumed the role of Rebus.

== Casts ==
Character	2023 premiere	2024 tour
John Rebus	John Michie	Gray O'Brien
Harriet Godwin	Rebecca Charles	Teressa Bonham
Jack Fleming	Billy Hartman	Billy Hartman
Stephanie Jeffries	Emily Joyce	Abigail Thaw
Paul Godwin	Forbes Masson	Neil McKinven
Candida Jones	Emma Noakes	Jade Kennedy
