= Beat Goes On =

The Beat Goes On, or variants, may refer to:

== Music ==
=== Albums ===
- The Beat Goes On (Herbie Mann album), 1967
- The Beat Goes On! (Sonny Criss album), 1968
- The Beat Goes On (Vanilla Fudge album), 1968
- The Beat Goes On: The Best of Sonny & Cher, 1991
- The Beat Goes On (Emilie-Claire Barlow album), 2010
- The Beat Goes On (Cash Cash album), 2012
- ... and the Beat Goes On!, 1995 album by Scooter
- ...The Beat Goes On, 2005 album by Blacklisted
- The Beat Goes On, a 2009 album by Swedish singer Eva Eastwood
- The Beat Goes On (Super Junior D&E EP), 2015

=== Songs ===
- "Beat Goes On" (Madonna song), 2008
- "Michael Jackson (The Beat Goes On)", 2012
- "The Beat Goes On" (Sonny & Cher song), 1967
- "The Beat Goes On" (Beady Eye song), 2011
- "And the Beat Goes On" (The Whispers song), 1979
- "This Beat Goes On/Switchin' to Glide", a 1980 song by The Kings
- "The Beat Goes On", a 2002 song by Bob Sinclar

== Other uses ==
- The Beat Goes On (short story collection), a book of Inspector Rebus short stories by Ian Rankin
- Beat Goes On Records (now BGO Records), a UK record company specialising in re-issues of music from the 1950s to the 1980s
- And the Beat Goes On (film), a 2009 film
- And the Beat Goes On (TV series), a 1996 British TV miniseries
- And the Beat Goes On, an autobiography of Sonny Bono
- And the Beat Goes On: The Sonny and Cher Story, a biopic on Sonny & Cher from 1999, based on the biography of the same name
- "Beat Goes On", an episode of the series Ruby Gloom
- "The Beat Goes On" (Holby City), a television episode
- "The Beat Goes On" (Only Murders in the Building), a television episode
- Trolls: The Beat Goes On!, a TV series
