= The Oxford Bar =

Listed pub in Edinburgh, Scotland

- The pub in 2012

General information
- Type: Public house; originally a house
- Location: 8 Young Street, New Town, Edinburgh, Scotland
- Coordinates: 55°57′10.61″N 03°12′19.82″W
- Year built: c. 1779; 247 years ago
- Opened: 1811; 215 years ago (as a pub)

Design and construction
- Designations

Listed Building – Category B
- Official name: 8 and 8A Young Street, the Oxford Bar, and 2 Young Street Lane South
- Designated: 3 March 1966
- Reference no.: LB30005

The Oxford Bar is a Category B listed public house on Young Street in the New Town area of Edinburgh, Scotland. The pub is associated with Ian Rankin's Inspector Rebus novels and television adaptations, in which it is the favourite pub of the fictional detective John Rebus. Originally constructed as a house shortly after 1779, the building had become a public house by 1811. Its interior is included in the Campaign for Real Ale (CAMRA)'s National Inventory of Historic Pub Interiors, where it is rated three stars and regarded as being of "outstanding national historic importance".

== History ==
The building was constructed shortly after 1779 as a house and had become a public house by 1811, although it also operated as a confectioner's shop in 1843. It was disponed to the wine and spirit merchant Andrew Wilson in 1893 and subsequently remained in use as a public bar.

On 3 March 1966, the Oxford Bar was designated a Category B listed building. It was included on the Campaign for Real Ale (CAMRA)'s National Inventory of Historic Pub Interiors before the inventory's grading system was revised. Under the revised scheme, it is rated three stars and its interior is regarded as being "of outstanding national historic importance".

== Cultural associations ==
Several Scottish writers and artists are known to have frequented the Oxford Bar, including Sydney Goodsir Smith, Willie Ross and Ian Rankin. The pub features in Smith's Carotid Cornucopius, while Rankin adopted it as the regular pub of his fictional detective John Rebus.

Other visitors to the bar have included Sean Connery and Colin Dexter. Michael Palin visited in 1978 and wrote favourably about it in his diary, The Python Years.

The Oxford Bar is also mentioned in Quintin Jardine's 2009 Bob Skinner novel Fatal Last Words.

In August 2024, a visit by television presenter Lorraine Kelly attracted coverage in the local press.

== Architecture ==
=== Exterior ===
The building occupies a corner site and was constructed as a classical-style house. It is built of cream sandstone ashlar, with parts of the ground floor painted, and has two storeys, a half-sunken basement and an attic. The principal elevation is arranged in three bays beneath an eaves cornice, while the ground floor retains a timber-framed public bar frontage with a projecting cornice, an ornamental wrought-iron sign bracket and historic "Bernard's Pale Ale" lettering on one of the windows. The roof is punctuated by two large slate-hung canted dormers. A two-bay rubble-built gable elevation faces the side street, and the building rises to three storeys at the rear. An adjoining later sandstone range extends to the rear. Windows are mainly timber sash-and-case, although some first-floor openings contain modern replacements. The roof has stone-coped gables and stone chimney stacks, some of which have been rebuilt.

=== Interior ===
The interior has undergone relatively little alteration and retains much of its late 19th-century character. Traditional features include four-panel timber doors, timber panelling to dado height, a moulded cornice in the central corridor and a simpler cornice in the main bar. The principal bar is a compact standing drinking area centred on an L-shaped timber-panelled servery, with a low mirrored bar back containing cupboards and mirrored panels. A carved timber fireplace survives in the main bar, although it is partly obscured by the counter. A separate seating room to the right contains window shutters, a brick fireplace and a historic brewery mirror.
