= Rebus (2024 TV series) =

British television series

- Genre: Crime drama
- Based on: Rebus by Ian Rankin
- Written by: Gregory Burke
- Directed by: Niall MacCormick; Fiona Walton
- Starring: Richard Rankin
- Country of origin: Scotland
- Original language: English
- No. of series: 1
- No. of episodes: 6

Production
- Executive producers: Jill Green; Paula Cuddy; Eve Gutierrez; Isabelle Hultén; Tomas Axelsson; Ian Rankin; Gregory Burke; Niall MacCormick
- Production companies: Eleventh Hour Films; Viaplay Group (series 1)

Original release
- Network: BBC One; BBC Scotland
- Release: 17 May 2024 – present

Rebus is a Scottish crime drama television series based on the Inspector Rebus novels by Sir Ian Rankin, and starring Richard Rankin (no relation) in the titular role. The episodes are written by Gregory Burke, directed by Niall MacCormick and Fiona Walton. Burke and Ian Rankin also serve as executive producers. It was produced by Swedish production company Viaplay Group but sold to BBC Television. The series, which consists of six episodes, began airing on 17 May 2024.

On 11 July 2025, it was announced that a second series had been commissioned.

== Synopsis ==
The story follows Detective John Rebus as he deals with an infamous Edinburgh gangster, at the same time dealing with the aftermath of his divorce and a changing workplace.

== Cast and characters ==
- Richard Rankin as John Rebus
- Lucie Shorthouse as DC Siobhan Clarke, Rebus's partner
- Thoren Ferguson as DI Malcolm Fox
- Caroline Lee-Johnson as DI Gill Templer
- Sean Buchanan as George Blantyre, Rebus's mentor
- Michelle Duncan as Maggie, George's wife
- Stuart Bowman as Ger Cafferty, a mobster
- Noof Ousellam as Darryl Christie, a powerful businessman
- Brian Ferguson as Michael Rebus, John's brother
- Neshla Caplan as Chrissie, Michael's wife
- Amy Manson as Rhona, John's ex-wife and Sammy's mother
- Mia McKenzie as Sammy, John and Rhona's daughter

== Production ==
The series was announced in November 2022, as the debut UK production of Swedish streaming service Viaplay. In March 2023, Richard Rankin was announced as the star. In April, the supporting cast was announced, along with the fact that filming had started.

The episodes are written by Gregory Burke, and directed by Niall MacCormick and Fiona Walton, with Burke and Ian Rankin serving as executive producers. The series consists of six episodes.

In 2024, after post-production had ended, Viaplay decided to move away from the UK, and sold Rebus to the BBC.

Production on the second series began in June 2026.

== Broadcast ==
The series aired on BBC One and BBC Scotland on 17 May 2024.

In Australia, SBS Television aired the complete series on SBS on Demand streaming service from 2 August, with episodes also aired weekly on television from 15 August.
