= The West Wind =

The West Wind may refer to:

- The West Wind (newspaper), an American newspaper
- The West Wind (painting), a 1917 painting by Canadian painter Tom Thomson
- The West Wind (sculpture), a 1928-9 sculpture by Henry Moore

== See also ==
- Ode to the West Wind, an 1819 poem by Percy Bysshe Shelley
- The West Wing
- West wind (disambiguation)
- Westwind (disambiguation)
