= Alexander Morton =

Scottish actor (1945–2026)

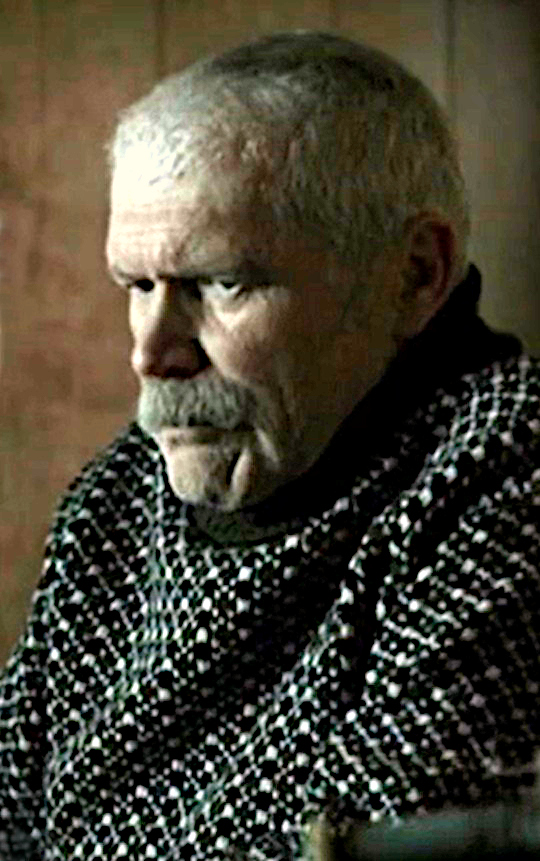
- Morton in Shetland, 2013
- Born: Alexander Edwards Morton; 24 March 1945; Glasgow, Scotland
- Died: 14 April 2026 (aged 81)
- Education: Royal Central School of Speech and Drama
- Occupation: Actor
- Years active: 1971–2022
- Spouse: Jane Morton

Alexander Edwards Morton (24 March 1945 – 14 April 2026) was a Scottish actor. He is known mainly for his role as Golly Mackenzie, the ghillie in the BBC television series Monarch of the Glen, who he played between 2000 and 2005.

== Acting career ==
Glasgow-born Morton trained in London at the Central School of Speech and Drama from 1965 to 1968 and is well known for his roles in several leading drama series, such as Taggart, Second Sight, Between the Lines, Minder, and Casualty; movies such as Croupier and London to Brighton; and single dramas The One That Got Away (1996), Looking After Jo Jo (1998), and The Man-Eating Wolves of Gysinge (2005).

Morton is best known for playing the ghillie Golly Mackenzie in the BBC TV series Monarch of the Glen (2000–2005, appearing in all 64 episodes), and before that made regular appearances throughout the 1980s and 1990s as the evil Andy Semple in the Scottish soap Take the High Road. From 2012 to 2015, Morton played criminal Billy Kennedy in Scottish soap opera River City. He appeared again as Billy Kennedy in the 20th anniversary episode of the show in 2022.

Highlights of his stage career include his work with Raindog Theatre Company in the early 1990s, of which he was a founding member, along with Robert Carlyle, Caroline Paterson, Stuart Davids, and others. Leading roles with Raindog included his Scots rendition of Shakespeare's Macbeth and R.P. McMurphy in One Flew Over the Cuckoo's Nest, both directed by Robert Carlyle. Morton also worked regularly with theatre companies 7:84 and Borderline, and has appeared at the Traverse, the Lyceum, the Bush, and the Royal Court. He has appeared in pantomime as well, notably at the Eden Court Theatre in Inverness with Andy Gray, and at Glasgow's King's Theatre.

In 2006, Morton played the Prince of Darkness in the BBC Radio adaptation of Dracula (Voyage of the Demeter, 2006). He was also the first actor to play Detective Inspector John Rebus in the BBC Radio 4 adaptation of Ian Rankin's Rebus series of books. He also provided voices for video games, including Heavenly Sword, Viking: Battle for Asgard and as Zoltan Chivay in The Witcher 2: Assassins of Kings along with its sequel The Witcher 3: Wild Hunt. He was the narrator on three albums by the Swiss Celtic / Melodic Death Metal band Eluveitie.

== Personal life and death ==
Morton was married three times, and had two children from each of his first two marriages. His first wife was Pam Scotcher; his second was Denise; and his third is Jane, whom he met before filming for Monarch of the Glen got underway. She was his landlady while he was doing television work in London. Jane's son and Morton's stepson is actor Leo Woodall.

Morton died from heart failure on 14 April 2026, at the age of 81.

== Film and television credits ==
Morton's credits include:

- 1971: Get Carter (film) Hubert – directed by Mike Hodges
- 1971: Manipulators (TV) written and directed by Mike Hodges
- 1979: Play for Today (TV): Ploughman's Share – Dave
- 1980–1994: Take the High Road (TV) – Andy Semple
- 1981: Play for Today (TV): The Good Time Girls – Alec Park
- 1984: Minder (TV): Windows – Alex
- 1985: Taggart (TV): Dead Ringer – David Balfour
- 1986: Waiting for Elvis (TV) Ike Morrison – directed by Hal Duncan
- 1987: Extras (TV) – Frank Riley – directed by David Andrew
- 1987: Bookie (TV) – Ross
- 1989: Winners and Losers (TV) – Ross
- 1990: Silent Scream – Don Winters
- 1992: Rab C. Nesbitt (TV) – Police Inspector Mccrae
- 1992–1994: Firm Friends (TV) – D.I. Hogg
- 1993: Between the Lines (TV) – Superintendent Tyrell
- 1993: Taggart (TV): Death Benefits – John Fraser
- 1994: Jolly a Man for All Seasons – Police Sergeant Watson
- 1994: Crime Story – John McVicar
- 1994: The Tales of Para Handy – John Cruickshank
- 1996: Bad Boys – Dick
- 1996: The One that Got Away – Big Bob (credited as Sandy Morton)
- 1996: Nightlife (TV movie) – D.C.Dave
- 1997: Looking After Jo Jo – DS Alistair Wright
- 1997: Bombay Blue – Jack Grey
- 1997: Love Me Tender (TV) – Tommy
- 1998: Croupier (film) David Reynolds
- 1999–2000: Second Sight (TV) – DS Julian
- 1999: Life Support (TV) – Alan Carswell
- 2000–2005: Monarch of the Glen (TV) – Golly Mackenzie in all 64 episodes
- 2005: The Man-Eating Wolves of Gysinge (TV) – Malmberg Nilsson
- 2006: Casualty (TV)
- 2006: London to Brighton (film) – Duncan Allen
- 2007: Kitchen (TV) – Mr. Glasgow
- 2008: Casualty (TV)
- 2009: Valhalla Rising (film) – Chieftain Barde
- 2010: Taggart: (TV) The Rapture – James Hardie
- 2010: Luther (TV) – Bill Winingham
- 2012–2015: River City (TV) – Billy Kennedy
- 2013: Shetland (TV) – Joseph Wilson
- 2022: River City (TV) – Billy Kennedy

== Selected theatre credits ==
Selected stage productions
Year	Play	Role	Notes
1976	An Me Wi a Bad Leg Tae	Peter	Original production of Billy Connolly's first play, directed by Stuart Mungall
1979	Slab Boys Trilogy	Mr. Curry/Workman	John Byrne's critically acclaimed series of stage plays
1984	William Wallace	William Wallace	Borderline Theatre Company, Directed by Stuart Mungall.
1985	The Bruce	Robert the Bruce	Edinburgh Festival
1986	Robert Burns	Robert Burns	By Joe Corrie, Scottish Theatre Company; Directed by David Hayman
1986	The Gorbals Story	Peter Reilly	By Robert Mcleish. 7:84 Theatre Co. Directed by David Hayman
1989	The Sash	William MacWilliam	By Hector MacMillan. 7:84 Theatre Co. Directed by Gerard Kelly
1991	Red Riding Hood: The Sequel	Wolverine	Directed by Andy Gray.
1991	One Flew Over the Cuckoo's Nest	R.P.McMurphy	Raindog Theatre Company. Directed by Robert Carlyle
1992	Macbeth: In the Scots Tongue	Macbeth	Raindog Theatre Company. Best Director Award: Robert Carlyle
1994	Dick Wittington	King Rat	With Christopher Biggins. King's Theatre, Glasgow
1995	Follow Follow: The Rangers Story	Max Factor	King's Theatre Glasgow/Glasgow Rangers FC; Directed by Ron Bain
1996	The Architect	Leo Black	Directed by Philip Howard, Traverse Theatre, Edinburgh
1998	Buried Treasure	Frank McCoig	Directed by Robin Lefevre, Lyric Theatre, London

== Radio credits ==
Selected BBC Radio plays
Year	Title	Role	Notes
1982	The Thirty Nine Steps	Franklin P. Scudder	Considered the most faithful adaptation of John Buchan's book.
1988	Death of a Fly	Alec Bodine	Murder mystery told from the perspective of a fly.
1995	The Serpent's Back	Cully	First adaptation of Ian Rankin's Cully series
1998	Tunes of Glory	Basil Barrow	
1999	Let It Bleed	DI John Rebus	First adaptation of Ian Rankin's Rebus books
2004	Dr Korczak's Example	Dr. Janusz Korczak	BBC Radio 4 Saturday Play directed by Lu Kemp
2005	The Tragical Comedy or Comical Tragedy of Mr. Punch	Swatchell	BBC Radio 3 The Wire directed by Lu Kemp
2007	Voyage of the Demeter	Count Dracula	Morton offers a terrifying rendition of the Prince of Darkness
2008	They Have Oak Trees in North Carolina	Ray	BBC Radio 4 Friday Play directed by Gaynor Macfarlane
2011	Occupation	Kenny Gall	BBC Radio 4 Afternoon Play directed by Gaynor Macfarlane

== Video game credits ==
Selected productions
Year	Title	Role	Notes	Ref.
2009	Killzone 2	Helghast		
2011	The Witcher 2: Assassins of Kings	Zoltan Chivay	English dub	
2012	LittleBigPlanet PS Vita	The Puppeteer		
2013	Ni no Kuni: Wrath of the White Witch	Old Father Oak	English dub	
2015	The Witcher 3: Wild Hunt	Zoltan Chivay	English dub	
