= Blood Hunt =

Blood Hunt can refer to:

- American Ninja 3: Blood Hunt, 1989 American martial arts action film
- Blood Hunt (comics), a 2024 Marvel Comics crossover event
- Blood Hunt (novel), a 1995 crime novel by Ian Rankin

== See also ==
- Operation Blood Hunt, 2024 Thai-American war action horror film
