= A Cool Head =

2009 book by Ian Rankin

- First edition
- Author: Ian Rankin
- Language: English
- Genre: Crime fiction
- Published: 2009 (Orion Press)
- Publication place: Scotland
- Media type: Print (paperback)
- Pages: 128 pp
- ISBN: 0-7528-8449-2
- OCLC: 271772694

A Cool Head is Ian Rankin's entry in Quick Reads 2009.

== Plot summary ==
Gravy works in a graveyard. One day his friend turns up in a car he doesn't recognise. His friend has a bullet in his chest. Gravy is asked to hide the gun and the body. In the back of the car is blood, and a bag full of money. Soon Gravy is caught up in a robbery gone wrong and is pursued by some desperate and mysterious men as well as the police.
