= Inspector Rebus =

Series of detective novels by Ian Rankin

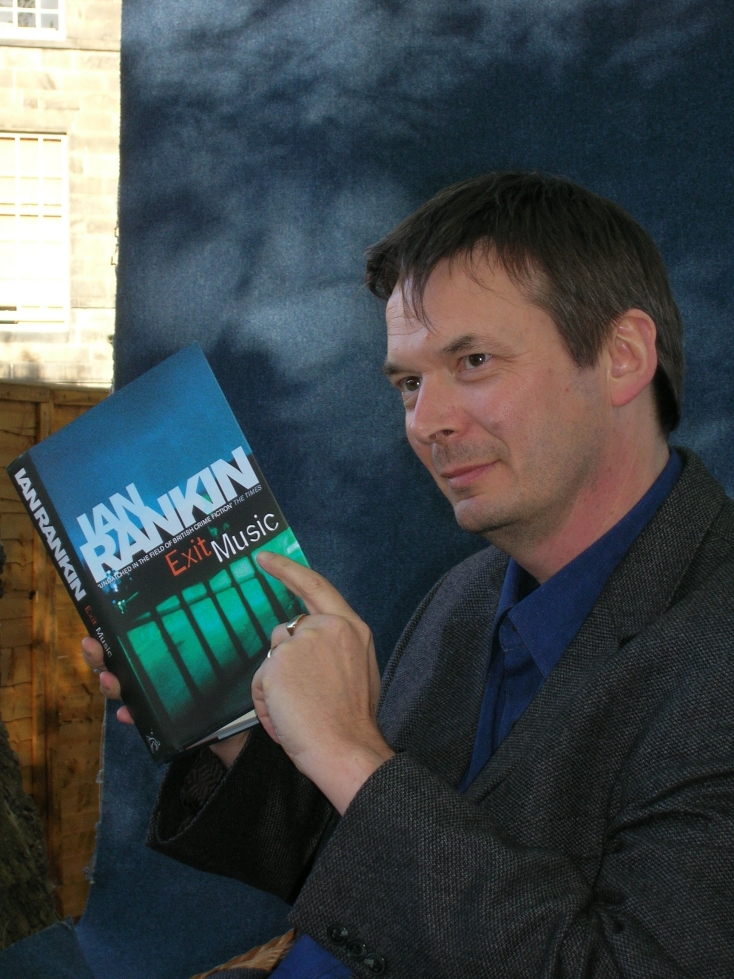
Ian Rankin at the Edinburgh International Book Festival

The Inspector Rebus books are a series of detective novels by the Scottish author Ian Rankin. The novels, all involving Detective Inspector John Rebus, are mostly based in and around Edinburgh. They are considered an important contribution to 'Tartan Noir'.

== Overview ==
=== Genre and Literary Influences ===
The Rebus novel series began in 1987 when Ian Rankin published Knots and Crosses. His intention was to write a standalone variation on Strange Case of Dr Jekyll and Mr Hyde by Robert Louis Stevenson, set in contemporary Edinburgh. He was at first upset that bookshops shelved it in the crime fiction section, but he gradually accepted the fact that Rebus was to be the protagonist of a detective series: his goal became to write "on the surface a crime novel that was going to sell loads of copies, but which would be accepted by my peers in academia as serious Scottish fiction." From 1991 to 2007, Rankin produced a new Rebus novel every year, and there have been seven "late" novels from 2012 to 2022, with a retired Rebus. The 1997 book, Black & Blue, which linked Rebus's case with the unsolved Bible John murders, achieved the double goal of sales and prestige. First, it was a best-seller and the backlist of Rebus novels came into high demand. Second, it won the Crime Writers' Association Gold Dagger Award, but also came into consideration on more general lists of the best Scottish novels or writers, and was discussed in the British press as a novel which transgressed the boundaries of genre. The fact that in 2002 a book on Black & Blue was commissioned for the Continuum Contemporaries Series, alongside authors such as A.S. Byatt, Arundhati Roy, and Nobellists Kazuo Ishiguro and Toni Morrison, makes it clear that Rankin had become a "serious" author on the international stage.

Rebus has continued to wrestle with his own "Hyde" aspects, particularly when confronted with old cases where his recklessness may have led to injustice or death. Other characters have borne out this theme of the dual self, for example the Wolfman serial killer in Tooth and Nail and the former Nazi Lintz in The Hanging Garden. Most importantly, since The Black Book (1992), Rebus has confronted 'Big Ger' Cafferty, a vicious gangster about his own age. Rankin compares the relationship between Rebus and Cafferty to that of Wringhim and Gilmartin (the devil himself) in the Scottish crime classic Confessions of a Justified Sinner (1824) by James Hogg.

=== Place and time ===
Except for Tooth and Nail, all the Rebus novels are set in Scotland, and most of them in Edinburgh. Rankin and interviewers such as Gavin Esler have remarked that the city is a character in the novels. Early on, in 1992, Rankin published A Good Hanging, a series of twelve stories set at different times of the year in different areas of Edinburgh. In 1993, in The Black Book, he also associated Rebus for the first time with a real Edinburgh police station, St Leonard's, and thereafter began to place Rebus in real locations in the city, such as the Oxford Bar and an apartment in Arden Street. In 2005 Rankin published Rebus's Scotland: A Personal Journey, and Rebus-themed walking tours of Edinburgh have become available. Christopher Ward explores in depth the relationship of Rebus to Edinburgh in his 2010 M.Phil. thesis at the University of Glasgow, "It's hard to be a saint in the city: Notions of city in the Rebus novels of Ian Rankin".

Most of the novels include both scenes set in neglected or criminal areas and others set in casinos, deluxe hotels, or other haunts of the rich. Rebus (in his thoughts) and Rankin (in interviews) refer to this contrast as the "underworld and overworld" of the city. Rankin has noted that he enjoys writing about Rebus precisely because, as a policeman, he has a right to entry in both worlds. Rankin stresses that the city of Edinburgh itself has a Jekyll/Hyde quality, contrasting the twisting, multilayered Old Town clustered around Edinburgh Castle with the beautiful, rationally laid-out New Town.

Rankin decided early on that the Rebus novels would be set "in real time", that is, in about the year they were written, reflecting current events. Eleanor Bell notes that "Throughout his detective series Rankin has therefore aspired to present authentic visions of Scotland, to reflect subtle changes of detail in Edinburgh life and provide persuasive representations of the nation" as political and economic changes occur. Thus, for example, the Rebus novels reflect the long process of road blockages and drivers' frustrations during the construction of the Edinburgh Trams. The novels have also tracked the even longer struggles for Scottish Independence, including delving into the past in the Malcolm Fox novel The Impossible Dead. As a result, the Rebus novels are discussed in contexts such as "Concepts of Corruption: Crime Fiction and the Scottish 'State'" and "Redevelopment Fiction: Architecture, Town-planning, and 'Unhomeliness.'"

=== Characters ===
See List of Inspector Rebus characters.

The unifying point of view in the Rebus series is that of John Rebus, with the point of view sometimes shifting to colleagues, criminals or suspects.

Among his colleagues, the most important is Siobhan Clarke, whose point of view is often as fully represented as Rebus's in the novels beginning with Set in Darkness (2000). The character allowed critics to approach the Rebus series from a feminist point of view. When Rankin wrote a novel in which Rebus himself retired, Exit Music (2007), there was speculation that the series would continue with Clarke as the main protagonist; the suggestion of Mark Lawson, that new Rebus novels would feature "Rebus playing Hannibal Lecter to her Agent Clarice Starling", is not impossible, since in some of the later novels—e.g. In a House of Lies (2018) and A Heart Full of Headstones (2022)—Rebus is not only trying to advise her on her cases but is under investigation himself.

When Rebus retired in Exit Music, Rankin instead wrote two novels set in the same world of Edinburgh policing, but from the point of view of Malcolm Fox, an Inspector with Internal Affairs. Although these novels, The Complaints and The Impossible Dead, are usually excluded from the Rebus series, Fox became a significant character in the Rebus novels when they resumed in 2012 with Standing in Another Man's Grave. He represents a point of view in which Rebus's maverick attitudes are not merely outmoded or superseded, but potentially criminal; however, after he becomes acquainted with Rebus, he recognizes that the older man did have standards of his own.

Rankin used the point of view of the criminals being pursued by Rebus effectively in early novels like Knots and Crosses and Tooth and Nail but seems to have dropped this device. In some of the later novels, Rebus's nemesis, the gangster 'Big Ger' Cafferty, is a point of view character; often the glimpse of his thoughts allows the reader to understand the strange relationship between the two not-quite-retired men. However, Cafferty's point of view usually confirms that he is even more evil than Rebus imagines. The young gangster Darryl Christie, who appears in four novels from 2012 to 2016, is another effectively portrayed "bad guy." In A Heart Full of Headstones Rankin gives us the point of view of a policeman who comes close to killing a suspect in the same manner as the murder of George Floyd, while being filmed by bystanders.

== Publishing history ==
The Inspector Rebus series is commercially successful in the United Kingdom, accounting for an estimated 10% of all crime book sales in the UK as of 2015. The books routinely sell half a million copies each, and have been translated into 36 languages. As of 2015 they are published in the UK by the Orion Publishing Group. The seventeenth was thought to be the last as Rebus turned sixty, the age of retirement for CID officers, and in 2009 Rankin produced a fresh protagonist in the form of Inspector Malcolm Fox of the police's Complaints and Conduct Department. In this book (The Complaints) and its 2011 sequel (The Impossible Dead) Rebus and his colleague (Detective Sergeant Siobhan Clarke) did not appear. However at the Hay Festival in June 2012 Rankin announced a further book, entitled Standing in Another Man's Grave, subsequently released in November 2012. This was followed by further novels in which Rebus (now a civilian), Clarke (now promoted to Detective Inspector) and Fox all served as protagonists.

=== Novels ===
1. Knots and Crosses (1987)
2. Hide and Seek (1991)
3. Tooth and Nail (original title Wolfman) (1992)
4. Strip Jack (1992)
5. The Black Book (1993)
6. Mortal Causes (1994)
7. Let It Bleed (1996)
8. Black & Blue (1997)
9. The Hanging Garden (1998)
10. Dead Souls (1999)
11. Set in Darkness (2000)
12. The Falls (2001)
13. Resurrection Men (2002)
14. A Question of Blood (2003)
15. Fleshmarket Close (published in the US as Fleshmarket Alley) (2004)
16. The Naming of the Dead (2006)
17. Exit Music (2007)
18. Standing in Another Man's Grave (2012)
19. Saints of the Shadow Bible (2013)
20. Even Dogs in the Wild (2015)
21. Rather Be the Devil (2016)
22. In a House of Lies (2018)
23. A Song for the Dark Times (2020)
24. A Heart Full of Headstones (2022)
25. Midnight and Blue (2024)

=== Short stories ===
* = published in some version of The Beat Goes On (2014) (Note: The 2015 paperback edition of "The Beat Goes On" includes two stories not in the 2014 hardback edition; My Shopping Day and Cinders.)

** = published in A Good Hanging and Other Stories (1992) as well as in The Beat Goes On.

- "Playback" (1990)**
- "Talk Show" (1991)**
- "The Dean Curse" (1992)**
- "Being Frank" (1992)**
- "Concrete Evidence" (1992)**
- "Seeing Things" (1992)**
- "A Good Hanging" (1992)**
- "Tit For Tat" (1992)**
- "Not Provan" (1992)**
- "Sunday" (1992)**
- "Auld Lang Syne" (1992)**
- "The Gentlemen's Club" (1992)*
- "Monstrous Trumpet" (1992)*
- "Trip Trap" (1992)*
- "In The Frame" (1992)*
- "Castle Dangerous" (1993)*
- "Well Shot" (1993)
- "Facing The Music" (1994)*
- "Window of Opportunity" (1995)*
- "My Shopping Day" (1997)*
- "Death Is Not the End" (1998)* --novella related to Dead Souls
- "Get Shortie" (1999)
- "The Acid Test" (1999)
- "No Sanity Clause" (2000)*
- "Tell Me Who to Kill" (2000)*
- "Saint Nicked" (2002)*
- "Atonement" (2005)*
- "Not Just Another Saturday" (2005)*
- "Penalty Clause" (2010)*
- "Dead and Buried" (2013)* --closely related to Saints of the Shadow Bible
- "The Passenger" (2014)*
- "A Three-Pint Problem" (2014)*
- "The Very Last Drop" (2014)*
- "In the Nick of Time" (2014)
- "Cinders" (2014)*
- "Cafferty's Day" (2016) --closely related to Rather Be the Devil
- "Charades" (2017)

=== Collections ===
- Rebus - The Early Years [Knots and Crosses, Hide and Seek, Tooth and Nail] (1990)
- Rebus - The St. Leonards' Years [Strip Jack, The Black Book, Mortal Causes] (2001)
- Rebus - The Lost Years [Let it Bleed, Black & Blue, The Hanging Garden] (1998)
- Rebus - Capital Crimes [Dead Souls, Set in Darkness, The Falls] (2004)
- Rebus - Three Great Novels [Resurrection Men, A Question of Blood, Fleshmarket Close] (2008)
- The Complete Short Stories [A Good Hanging and Other Stories, Beggars Banquet, Atonement] (2005)

=== Also ===
- Rankin, Ian (2005). Rebus's Scotland: A Personal Journey. London: Orion. ISBN 978-0-75285-245-4. - non-fiction book discussing the background to the Rebus novels.
- Rankin, Ian (1996). Hullah, Paul; Muroya, Yozo (eds.). Playback and Talk Show : New Edinburgh Crimes. Tokyo: Kenkyūsha. ISBN 4327421324. Archived from the original on 26 March 2009.

=== Audiobooks ===
All of the Rebus novels are available as audiobooks, some in several versions: narrated by different people or in abridged and unabridged form. Narrators include:

- James MacPherson
- Jamie Glover
- Bill Paterson (The Black Book, Hide and Seek)
- Samuel Gillies (Strip Jack, Set in Darkness, Tooth and Nail, Let It Bleed, The Falls, Beggar's Banquet)
- Roger Allam
- Joe Dunlop (Dead Souls, Resurrection Men)
- James Frain
- David Rintoul (Mortal Causes)
- Tom Cotcher (A Question of Blood, Fleshmarket Close, The Naming of the Dead)
- Michael Page (A Question of Blood, Fleshmarket Alley (Close))
- Ewan Stewart (Knots and Crosses, Hide and Seek, unabridged versions)

Three of the novels have won Spoken Word Awards: Strip Jack (Gold), A Question of Blood and Resurrection Men (Silver).

An innovative new design, the illustrated audiobook was created for Rebus's Scotland (the CD box contains a 32-page booklet containing photographs from the book).

== Other adaptations ==
=== Television ===
Thirteen of the novels were dramatised for television between 2000 and 2007 in four series of Rebus. John Hannah played Inspector Rebus in the first series, before being replaced by Ken Stott for the next three. Series four of the programme also included an original episode, which unlike the other thirteen episodes aired, was not based on any of the Rankin novels. It was entitled "The First Stone".

A rebooted series of six episodes aired on BBC One and BBC Scotland from 17 May 2024. Produced by Nordic streaming service Viaplay, and starring Richard Rankin, it was the company's first UK original. After post-production had ended, Viaplay decided to move away from the UK, and sold Rebus to the BBC.

=== Radio ===
Alexander Morton voiced John Rebus in a 1999 BBC Radio 4 dramatization of Let it Bleed. Ron Donachie starred as Rebus in Radio 4's dramatizations of The Falls (2003), Resurrection Men (2004), Black & Blue (2008), Strip Jack (2010), The Black Book (2012), Set in Darkness (2014), A Question of Blood (2016) and Fleshmarket Close (2017), having previously played Rebus's Chief Constable in the TV series. Readings of the short story "Facing the Music" from Beggars Banquet, read by James MacPherson, and of the novella Death Is Not the End, performed by Douglas Henshall, have also been broadcast by BBC Radio.

=== Stage ===
A brand new story written for the stage by Ian Rankin and adapted by playwright Rona Munro entitled Rebus: Long Shadows had its premiere at the Birmingham Repertory Theatre on 20 September 2018 before touring the UK. The production was directed by Roxana Silbert and starred Charles Lawson as Rebus.

In 2023, Rankin and co-writer Simon Reade debuted a second play entitled Rebus: A Game Called Malice.

== See also ==
- List of characters from the Inspector Rebus series
- Lothian and Borders Police
- Areas of Edinburgh
