= Blood Hunt (novel) =

1995 novel by Ian Rankin

- First edition cover
- Author: Ian Rankin (as Jack Harvey)
- Language: English
- Genre: Thriller
- Publisher: Headline Book Publishing Ltd
- Publication date: 14 September 1995
- Publication place: Scotland
- Media type: Print (hardcover)
- Pages: 384 pp
- ISBN: 0-7472-1302-X
- OCLC: 33359329
- Preceded by: Bleeding Hearts

Blood Hunt is a 1995 crime novel by Ian Rankin, and the third of his books to be published under the pseudonym Jack Harvey.

== Plot summary ==
Gordon Reeve, a former SAS soldier, receives a phone call to his home in Scotland, informing him that his brother Jim has been found dead in a car in San Diego. The death looks like a suicide, the car being locked from the inside, and the gun still in Jim's hand. While in the USA to identify the body, Gordon realises that his brother was murdered, and that the police are reluctant to follow any lead. Retracing Jim's final hours, he connects Jim's death with his work as a journalist, investigating a multinational chemical corporation. Gordon soon discovers that he himself is being watched, so he decides to ask Jim's friends back in Europe for further information.

In London, he finds more hints, but no evidence for his brother's sources. After returning home, he finds that his house has been bugged by professionals. Sending his wife and son to a relative, he determines to take on his enemy on his own. There are two parties after him: the multinational corporation, represented by "Jay", a renegade SAS member, and an international investigation corporation, also somehow connected with the case.

Travelling to France in order to find out more from a journalist colleague of Jim's, they are attacked by a group of professional killers under orders from Jay, resulting in multiple deaths, and leading to Gordon falling under suspicion by the police. Gordon decides to return to the USA, where he infiltrates the investigation corporation and learns more about the history of the case. Then he travels to San Diego to collect more evidence, and eventually returns to England, deliberately leaving a trail for Jay. Their long enmity leads Jay to follow Gordon to Scotland, where Gordon kills him and his team in a final showdown. Gordon manages to locate Jim's hidden journalistic material, hopefully clearing Jim's name and his own.

== Connections to other Rankin books ==
Gordon Reeve was the villain in Rankin's first Inspector Rebus novel, Knots and Crosses. Rankin stated on his website that he used an alternate version of Reeve as the protagonist in his last "Jack Harvey" novel to give the Harvey period a "sense of 'closure'".

== Reception ==
The novel was not widely reviewed on release, but was well-received on re-release, with Kirkus Reviews praising the "breakneck pace", the technical detail and the portrayal of "anger turned to fury."
