= Westwind =

Westwind may refer to:

== Transportation ==
- IAI Westwind, a business jet
- Westwind, a call sign for West Wind Aviation, an aviation company based in Saskatoon, Canada
- Westwind (Honduran presidential plane), an IAI Westwind used as the Honduras Presidential Plane
- Paceship Westwind, a 23 foot keelboat built by Paceship Yachts in Canada
- USCGC Westwind (WAGB-281), a decommissioned ice breaker that served the United States Coast Guard

== Media and music ==
- Westwind (band), a French post-industrial band
- Westwind (film), a 2011 German comedy film
- Westwind (novel), a 1990 novel by Ian Rankin
- Westwind (TV series), broadcast on NBC in the mid-1970s
- Westwind: Djalu's Legacy, film about Djalu Gurruwiwi
  - Bärra West Wind, band led by two of Djalu's sons.

== Other uses ==
- Westwind Drift, or the Antarctic Circumpolar Current, an ocean current
- WestWind Energy, a wind farm development company
- YWCA Camp Westwind, a summer camp on the Oregon Coast

== See also ==
- West wind (disambiguation)
