= Bleeding Hearts (Harvey novel) =

1994 novel by Ian Rankin

- First edition
- Author: Ian Rankin (writing as Jack Harvey)
- Language: English
- Genre: Thriller
- Publisher: Orion Books
- Publication date: 1994
- Publication place: Scotland
- Media type: Print (hardback & paperback)
- Pages: 316 pages
- ISBN: 0-7472-0999-5
- OCLC: 46600414
- Preceded by: Witch Hunt
- Followed by: Blood Hunt

Bleeding Hearts is a 1994 crime novel by Ian Rankin, the second of his novels to be published under the pseudonym Jack Harvey.

== Plot summary ==
Michael Weston is a professional assassin with haemophilia. The wealthy father of a girl he killed by mistake years ago has sworn vengeance, hiring a private detective (Hoffer) to track him down.

== Background ==
Rankin has said that he wrote this book under the influence of Martin Amis's novel Money and that Weston was influenced by that novel's protagonist, John Self.

== Reception ==
The novel was not much reviewed on release, but gained more attention when re-released under the name of Ian Rankin in 2006. Publishers Weekly compared it negatively to the Rebus books, whilst praising the "nonstop action, copious violence and arcane details about weaponry and forensics."
