= West wind (disambiguation) =

A west wind is a wind that originates in the west and blows east.

West Wind may also refer to:

- Project West Wind, a wind farm west of Wellington, New Zealand
- "West Wind", a song by Miriam Makeba from The Magnificent Miriam Makeba
- West Wind Aviation, Saskatchewan's second-largest commercial aviation group
- West Wind Records, jazz record label

== See also ==
- East Wind: West Wind, an American novel
- The West Wind (disambiguation)
- West Wind Shores
- West Wing
- Westwind (disambiguation)
