= Witch Hunt (novel) =

1993 novel by Ian Rankin

- First edition
- Author: Ian Rankin (writing as "Jack Harvey")
- Language: English
- Genre: Thriller
- Publisher: Headline
- Publication date: 1993
- Publication place: Scotland
- Media type: Print (hardback & paperback)
- Pages: 464 pp
- ISBN: 0-7472-0887-5
- OCLC: 48883548
- Followed by: Bleeding Hearts

Witch Hunt is a 1993 crime novel by Ian Rankin, under the pseudonym "Jack Harvey". It is the first of three novels published under this pseudonym.

== Background ==
The novel was written while Rankin and his wife were living in France. Rankin chose to write under a pseudonym after the "respectable if underwhelming" sales of his earlier books.

He writes:

My agent came up with a plan: a pseudonymous series of mainstream thrillers. The Rebus books were still at this time short and uncomplicated affairs, and took about three months to write. I had time on my hands.

== Plot summary ==
A fishing boat sinks in the English Channel in the middle of the night, and the evidence points to murder. Ex-MI5 operative Dominic Elder comes out of retirement to help investigate the explosion of the boat, as it appears that his long-time obsession, a female assassin known as "Witch", may be responsible. Using the boat to get to England from France, Witch left a trail of clues to announce her arrival and to divert Elder.

That is the least of Special Branch's worries, if Elder's well-honed intuition is correct. He has seen her work before and knows her to be a resourceful enemy, who always seems a step ahead of the authorities. With an imminent summit of world leaders to be held in London, Witch's target seems obvious.

Young Michael Barclay's diligence leads him onto Witch's trail, with the help of his liaison in the French police, Dominique Herault. Apart from her language help and guidance around Paris, Michael is sexually attracted to her.

The team of detectives and MI5 agents, and the terrorist, play cat-and-mouse with each other in Scotland, England, France, and even briefly visit a former associate of Witch in prison in Germany.

== Reception ==
Reviews of the novel were mediocre, with The New York Times describing the author's decision to write from the female perspective as "bizarre", and Publishers Weekly acknowledging the "absorbing... police procedural sleuthing", whilst declaring the novel overall as "tepid".
