= Let It Bleed (novel) =

Book by Ian Rankin

Let it Bleed
- First edition
- Author: Ian Rankin
- Language: English
- Series: Inspector Rebus
- Genre: Detective fiction
- Publisher: Orion Books
- Publication date: 1995
- Publication place: Scotland
- Media type: Print (hardback & paperback)
- Pages: 278 pp
- ISBN: 1-85797-634-7
- OCLC: 43181191
- Preceded by: Mortal Causes
- Followed by: Black & Blue

Let it Bleed is a 1995 crime novel by Ian Rankin. It is the seventh of the Inspector Rebus novels. The US edition has a final chapter not present in the UK version; Rankin has explained that his North American publisher objected to the open, ambiguous conclusion of the original text.

== Plot summary ==
Detective Inspector John Rebus and Frank Lauderdale start the book with a car chase across Edinburgh to apprehend kidnappers, culminating with the two youths they are chasing throwing themselves off the Forth Road Bridge and in Rebus being injured in a car crash. Rebus's upset over this allows Rankin to show the character in a new light, revealing his isolation and potentially suicidal despair.

After the unconnected suicide of a terminally ill con, Rebus pursues an investigation that implicates respected people at the highest levels of government, and due to the politically sensitive nature of what he is doing, faces losing his job, or worse. He is supported by his daughter Sammy, allowing their distant relationship to be built upon.

== Publishing notes ==
The title refers to the Rolling Stones album Let it Bleed.

In one scene, Rankin describes Rebus putting his foot onto the bar rail in the Oxford Bar when a band is playing. This, Rankin states, caused many people to contact him to say that there wasn't a bar rail in the Oxford at that time. Rankin mused that this mistake (he claims he mis-remembered) has led to more complaints than anything else including historical inaccuracies or police procedure.

The American version of the book includes a final chapter not seen in the original UK publication. The American publishers were unhappy with the open ending in the book and so commissioned Rankin to complete the story for the American market.

== TV serial ==
An episode of the Rebus television series adapted the plot the book, with some differences. Ken Stott starred as Inspector Rebus.

== Reception ==
The book was enthusiastically received, with Kirkus Reviews calling it: "this author's boldest, most ambitious novel yet."
