= Ron Donachie =

Scottish actor (born 1956)

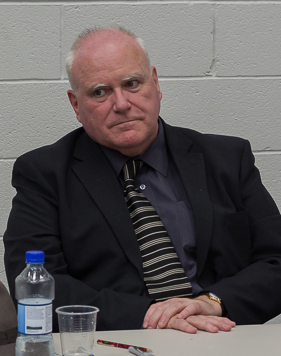
- Donachie in 2013
- Born: Ronald Eaglesham Porter; 26 April 1956 (age 70); Dundee, Angus, Scotland
- Education: Madras College, University of Glasgow
- Occupation: Actor
- Years active: 1980–present
- Spouse: Fiona Biggar (m. 1989)
- Children: 2, including Daniel Portman

Ronald Eaglesham Porter (born 26 April 1956), known professionally as Ron Donachie, is a Scottish character actor. He has appeared in supporting roles in films The Jungle Book (1994), Titanic, and television series Game of Thrones, in which he recurred as Ser Rodrik Cassel. He is, however, perhaps best known for portraying DI John Rebus in the BBC Radio 4 dramatisations of Sir Ian Rankin's Rebus detective novels, a role he reprised for the stage play Rebus: Long Shadows.

== Biography ==
=== Early life and career ===
Ronald Porter was born in Dundee, Scotland and educated at Madras College, St Andrews where he performed in three school plays: Serjeant Musgrave's Dance in 1972, A Man For All Seasons in 1973 for which the newspaper review said "Ron Porter was impressive from start to finish, handling a mammoth part with apparent ease, giving a sensitive, subtle and well-controlled performance, especially in the second act", and Taming of the Shrew in 1974 for which the newspaper review said "Ron Porter's affability shines out like the proverbial beacon ... as the most experienced member of the cast, he has the confidence to be able to establish an immediate rapport with the audience. ... [He] turned in his usual high standard of performance as the enormously arrogant Petruchio".

His education continued at the University of Glasgow where he was President of the Glasgow University Students' Representative Council (1976–1977) and graduated MA (Hons) in English Literature and Drama in 1979.

He joined John McGrath's 7:84 theatre group for their 1980–1981 touring production, John Burrows' One Big Blow, in which the cast mimicked a traditional colliery band by singing in six part harmony. Following the success of this play members of the cast founded the a cappella vocal group The Flying Pickets in 1982, but Donachie left before their 1983 Christmas number one hit.

=== Acclaim ===
Although Donachie has been prolific in television and films, these have all been ensemble or supporting parts. His leading roles on radio and the theatre have achieved acclaim:

"Ron Donachie plays [Rebus] in the BBC radio versions and he's really got the voice"
— Ian Rankin, author of the Rebus novels

Ron Donachie plays her father with an authority that makes his role as a sexual predator even more creepy.
— Six Characters in Search of an Author – Mark Fisher, The Guardian

When Ron Donachie takes the stage as Deputy Governor Danforth in the second half of Arthur Miller's classic, it's as if this 17th century parable of superstition and intolerance has a new centre of gravity. It's partly that Donachie seems three times bigger than everyone else, a bullish figure, no less fearsome for his legal attire. It's partly that his charismatic stillness commands attention and defies contradiction. But it's also that, in presenting himself as reasonable, considerate and fair, he puts you in mind of every leader who gets his way by masking ruthless force with politeness.
— The Crucible review – Mark Fisher, The Guardian

== Personal life ==
Donachie married Fiona Biggar, a complementary therapist, in 1989; the couple have two children: the actor Daniel Portman and Naomi Porter, a linguist. His brother, Stewart Porter, is also an actor and his sister-in-law is Scottish film costume designer Trisha Biggar.

== Film ==
Year	Title	Role	Director
1983	Ill Fares the Land		Bill Bryden
1984	Comfort and Joy	George	Bill Forsyth
1986	Heavenly Pursuits (The Gospel According to Vic)	Big Man in Bar	Charles Gormley
1987	White Mischief	Club Manager	Michael Radford
1988	The Zip	Biker	Jo Ann Kaplan
1994	The Jungle Book	Sergeant Harley	Stephen Sommers
1996	Lucky Suit	Failed comedian	Caroline Patterson
1997	Fierce Creatures	Sergeant Scott	Robert Young; Fred Schepisi
1997	Titanic	Master at Arms	James Cameron
1999	The Match	Happy Feet	Mick Davis
2000	Beautiful Creatures	Police Pathologist	Bill Eagles
2002	A Shot at Glory	Sportscaster	Michael Corrente
2002	Al's Lads	Birch	Richard Standeven
2003	Man Dancin'	Billy Maddison	Norman Stone
2005	Man to Man	Sir Walter Stephenson	Régis Wargnier
2005	The Adventures of Greyfriars Bobby	Laurie	John Henderson
2006	The Flying Scotsman	Scobie	Douglas Mackinnon
2008	Made of Honour	Horse Owner	Paul Weiland
2008	Stone of Destiny	Night Watchman	Charles Martin Smith
2008	The Daisy Chain	Doctor Ferguson	Aisling Walsh
2008	Max Manus	Colonel J.S. Wilson	Joachim Rønning; Espen Sandberg
2011	Blitz	Cross	Elliott Lester
2012	Filth	Hector	Jon S. Baird
2014	What We Did on Our Holiday	Sergeant Murdoch	Andy Hamilton; Guy Jenkin
2015	Sunset Song	Uncle Tam	Terence Davies
2017	Steel Rain	Michael Dobbs, US Secretary of State	Yang Woo-suk
2018	Outlaw King	Robert Wishart, Bishop of Glasgow	David Mackenzie
2022	Rocketry: The Nambi Effect	Val Cleaver	Ranganathan Madhavan
2025	I Swear	Headmaster Donald Watkins	Kirk Jones

== Television ==
Year	Title	Role	Notes
1983	Goodnight and God Bless	Bouncer	Episode: "Ronnie's Wonderful Day"
1983	Grey Granite	Provost James Speight	Episodes: "Duncalm" & "Stone Circle"
1983	Those Glory Glory Days	1961 Spurs Team Member	Television film
1984	Sakharov		Television film
1984	Play for Today	Big Lick	Episode: "It Could Happen to Anybody"
1984	Coronation Street	Joe Schofield	Episode: 2461
1985	Bulman	Bill Allison	Episode: "A Man of Conviction"
1986	The Monocled Mutineer	Strachan	Episodes: "Before the Shambles" & "When the Hurly-Burly's Done"
1986	Blood Red Roses	Charles Riggins	
1987	Tutti Frutti	Dennis Sproul	All 6 episodes
1987	Taggart	Pat Connolly	Episode: "Funeral Rites"
1987	Bust	Willie McGraw	Episode: "Family Business"
1988	Down Where the Buffalo Go	Drunk on ferry	Television film
1988	The Great Escape II: The Untold Story	Al Hake	Television film
1988	City Lights	Shughie McGlinchey	Episode: "Catch 23"
1988	God's Frontiersmen	Allen	Television dramatised documentary
1989	The Justice Game	Alex Patterson	All 4 episodes, series 1
1989	Snakes and Ladders	Mr Pym	Episodes 1, 2 & 6
1989	Mornin' Sarge	Stanley the Knife	Episode: "Stan the Knife"
1989	The Pied Piper (Crossing to Freedom)	RAF corporal	Television film
1990	The Gravy Train	Hatted Man	All 4 episodes
1990	Screen One	Big Mac	Episode: "Sweet Nothing"
1990	Stay Lucky	Jock	Episode: "Burning Your Boats"
1990	Rab C Nesbitt	James Balloon McSwaggerty	Episode: "Rat"
1990	The Bill	Sgt. Willis	Episode: "Effective Persuaders"
1990	Coasting	Frank	Episode: "Another Fine Mess"
1991	Jute City	Ginger McCrindle	
1991	Boon	Dougie	Episode: "Stamp Duty"
1991	Specials	Special Constable Freddy Calder	All 12 episodes
1992	Me, You and Him	Todd	All 6 episodes
1992	Casualty	PC Pewsey	Episode: "Rates of Exchange"
1992 – 1993	Take the High Road	Duncan Strachan	Recurring, 15 episodes
1993	Taggart	Marco Cellini	Episode: "Death Benefits"
1993	Strathblair	Bob Scott	Episode: "2.1"
1994	Lie Down with Lions	Kelly	Television film
1995	The Gambling Man	Alec McLean	Television serial
1995	Cracker	Barney, the psychologically damaged war veteran	Episode: "Brotherly Love"
1996	The Bill	William Hall	Episode: "Pointing the Finger"
1995 – 1996	Hamish Macbeth	Zoot McPherrin	Episodes: "West Coast Story" & "A Perfectly Simple Explanation"
1995 – 1996	The Governor	Prison Officer Russell Morgan	Main cast, both series
1996	Casualty	Ralph Sutcliffe	Episode: "Mother's Little Helper"
1997	Ivanhoe	Friar Tuck	Episodes 3, 4 & 6
1997	Supply & Demand	Supt. Brent	Episode: "Supply & Demand"
1997	The Bill	Mike Shearon	Episode: "Strange Meeting"
1997	Ain't Misbehavin'	Billy the Book	All 3 episodes
1998	Looking After Jo Jo	Des	Episodes: "Working Week" & "Sink the Belgrano"
1998	Magic with Everything	Police sergeant	Episode: "Imagine the Unimaginable"
1998	Taggart	Hamish Baird	Episode: "Dead Reckoning"
1998	The Life and Crimes of William Palmer	Leonard Bladon	Television film
1999	The Scarlet Pimpernel	Mazarini	4 episodes
1999	Rab C Nesbitt	Huggett	Episode: "Commons"
1999	Extremely Dangerous	Gebbert	All 4 episodes
2000 – 2001	Starhunter	McDuff	Episodes: "The Divinity Cluster" & "Dark and Stormy Night"
2000	Too Much Sun	Arnold Wyckoff	Episode: "Hollywood Phonies"
2001	Taggart	Peter Jenkins	Episode: "Falling in Love"
2001	Rebus	CS Wilson	Episode: "Dead Souls"
2001	Murder Rooms: Mysteries of the Real Sherlock Holmes	Fergusson	Episode: "The White Knight Stratagem"
2001	'Orrible	DI Chris Dodds	Episodes: "Dirty Dozen" & "New Best Friend"
2002	Shackleton	Keltie	Television serial / film
2002	Nova	Chippy McNeish	Episode: "Shackleton's Voyage of Endurance"
2002	The Inspector Lynley Mysteries	John Ross	Episode: "Payment in Blood"
2002	Auf Wiedersehen, Pet	Dan Calhoun	Episodes: "Heavy Metal", "Bridge Over Troubled Water" & "A Bridge Too Far"
2002	Silent Witness	DCI Luke Telford	Episode: "Tell No Tales"
2002 – 2004	The Bill	DCI Andrew Ross	Recurring, 15 episodes
2003	The Key	MacKaveny	All 3 episodes
2003	Monarch of the Glen	Alec McTavish	Episode: "Series 5, episode 10"
2004	The Genius of Mozart	Joseph Haydn	Episode: "The First Romantic"
2005	Uncle Adolf	Martin Bormann	Television film
2005	The Commander	George Hart	Episodes: "Virus" & "Blackdog"
2005	Heartbeat	Mr Gordon	Episode: "Services Rendered"
2005	Where the Heart Is	Gavin Morley	Episode: "Legacy"
2005	The Golden Hour	David Tremaine	Episode: "Episode 3"
2005	Summer Solstice	Macgregor	Television film
2006	Taggart	Harry Stein	Episode: "Law"
2006	Doctor Who	Steward	Episode: "Tooth and Claw"
2006	The Chatterley Affair	Mr Allen Lane	Television film
2001 – 2007	Rebus	DCS Wilson/DCS Jack Gunner	Episodes: "Dead Souls", "Let It Bleed", "Resurrection Men" & "The Naming of the Dead"
2007	Party Animals	Roger Brenton	Episode: "Episode 1"
2007	Recovery	Len Hamilton	Television film
2007	Sea of Souls	Minister	Episode: "The Prayer Tree: Part 1"
2007	Still Game	Cameron	Episode: "Fly Society"
2007	Heartbeat	Ken Dekin	Episode: "Where There's Smoke"
2008	Love Soup	Inspector Harbin	Episode: "The Menaced Assassin"
2009	No Holds Bard	Prison Officer	Television film
2010	Lewis	Professor Angus Rawbone	Episode: "Falling Darkness"
2010	The Deep	Sturridge	Television serial
2011	Doctors	John Harold Doric	Episode: "Doric's Column"
2011	Garrow's Law	Sir Alexander Lamb	Episode: "Episode 3"
2011 – 2012	Game of Thrones	Ser Rodrik Cassel	Recurring, 13 episodes Screen Actors Guild Award – nominated
2012	Waterloo Road	Billy Byrne	Recurring, 7 episodes
2012	Silk	Alasdair McKinley QC	Episode: "Wooden Overcoat"
2012	Downton Abbey	Mr McCree	Episode: "A Journey to the Highlands"
2013	Bob Servant Independent	Medical Director	Episode: "A Local Man"
2013	Shameless	'Biddy' Baxter	Episode: "Kiss, Kiss, Bang, Bang"
2013	The Field of Blood	DCI Sullivan	Episode: "The Dead Hour"
2013	Atlantis	Theos	Episode: "The Earth Bull"
2013	The Beautiful Spy	Major Bloomberg	Television film
2013 – 2014	Blandings	Angus McAllister	Episodes: "Lord Emsworth and the Girlfriend", "Throwing Eggs", "Sticky Wicket at Blandings" & "Custody of the Pumpkin"
2014	Bob Servant	Medical Director	Episode: "Court"
2015	Father Brown	Jock Hamilton	Episode: "The Owl of Minerva"
2015	Casualty	DI John Hartley	Episode: "The Rita Supremacy"
2016	Doctors	Jack Rayburn	Episode: "Play Date"
2016	Agatha Raisin	Ron Allen	Episode: "The Wellspring of Death"
2017	River City	Dr Michael ‘Mikey’ Rosenburg	Recurring, 4 episodes
2017	The Loch	Iain Sutherland	Television serial
2018	Vera	Jesse Hennings	Episode: "Blood and Bone"
2018	Starhunter ReduX	McDuff	Episodes: "The Divinity Cluster" & "Dark and Stormy Night"
2018	Casualty	Ben Loksley	Episode: "Episode 39"
2019	Holby City	Richard MacDonagh	Episode: "Mothers and Their Daughters"
2020	Deadwater Fell	Callum McKenzie	Episodes: "Episode 1" & "Episode 2"
2022	Screw	Don Carpenter	12 episodes
2022	Karen Pirie	Archie Duff	In this series his son Daniel Portman plays his character's son Colin Duff.
2022	Granite Harbour	Clellan Coburn	

== Theatre ==
Date	Title	Role	Director	Company / Theatre
Easter 1972	Serjeant Musgrave's Dance	Pte. Attercliffe	Ann & Bob Bridges	Madras College; The Byre
Easter 1973	A Man For All Seasons	Sir Thomas More	Ann & Bob Bridges	Madras College; The Byre
Easter 1974	Taming of the Shrew	Petruchio	Ann & Bob Bridges	Madras College; The Byre
1980 – 1981	One Big Blow		John Burrows	7:84 theatre group tour
1981 –	Civilians		Bill Bryden	Scottish Theatre Company; Theatre Royal, Glasgow
18 August 1981 – 26 September 1981	The Threepenny Opera	MacHeath	Alan J. Wands	Borderline Theatre Company Tour: 18–29 Aug / Roxy Art House, Edinburgh; 2–5 Sep / Craigie College Theatre, Ayr; 8–9 Sep / Bonar Hall, Dundee; 10–12 Sep / Magnum Theatre, Irvine; 14–15 Sep / East Kilbride Village Theatre; 16–17 Sep / Park Mains Theatre, Erskine; 18–19 Sep / Stanwix Arts Theatre, Carlisle; 22–26 Sep / Mitchell Theatre, Glasgow
–	Death of a Salesman	Willy Loman	Giles Havergal	Glasgow Citizens Theatre
–	'Tis Pity She's a Whore	Soranzo	Philip Prowse	Glasgow Citizens Theatre
–	The Merchant of Venice	Shylock	Philip Prowse	Glasgow Citizens Theatre
January 1989 –	The Alchemist	Sir Epicure Mammon	Robert David MacDonald	Glasgow Citizens Theatre
–	Douglas	Lord Randolph	Robert David MacDonald	Glasgow Citizens Theatre
–	A Tale of Two Cities	Etienne Defarge	Philip Prowse	Glasgow Citizens Theatre
30 August 1984 – 22 September 1984	Submariners	Housey	Philip Partridge	Gateway Theatre, Chester
27 September 1984 – 20 October 1984	Trafford Tanzi	Dad	Noreen Kershaw	Gateway Theatre, Chester
1 November 1984 – 24 November 1984	Macbeth	Macduff	Phil Partridge	Gateway Theatre, Chester
–	A View from the Bridge	Eddie Carbone	Phil Partridge	Gateway Theatre, Chester
26 February 1985 – 30 March 1985	Scrap	Mulligan	Chris Bond	Half Moon Theatre, London
11 July 1985 – 10 August 1985	Destiny	Major Rolfe	Chris Bond	Half Moon Theatre, London
November 1985 – 11 January 1986	Dracula	Sir Robert Heward	Chris Bond	Half Moon Theatre, London
21 February 1986 – 15 March 1986	A Streetcar Named Desire	Stanley Kowalski	Ian Wooldridge	Royal Lyceum Theatre, Edinburgh
6 October 1987 – 7 November 1987	Macbeth	Macbeth	Chris Bond	Half Moon Theatre, London
May 1990 –	Mother Courage		Philip Prowse	Mermaid Theatre, London
31 October 1990 – 24 November 1990	The Price	Victor Franz	Caroline Smith	Stephen Joseph Theatre, Scarborough
11 April 2003 – 21 June 2003	Scenes from the Big Picture	Bobby	Nicholas Hytner	National Theatre, London
26 October 2007 – 17 November 2007	Living Quarters	Commandant Frank Butler	John Dove	Royal Lyceum Theatre, Edinburgh
15 February 2008 – 8 March 2008	Six Characters in Search of an Author	Father	Mark Thomson	Royal Lyceum Theatre, Edinburgh
16 January 2009 – 14 February 2009	The Man Who Had All the Luck	Patterson Beeves	John Dove	Royal Lyceum Theatre, Edinburgh
4 May 2009 – 9 May 2009	The Oddest Couple	Ken	Eleanor Yule	Òran Mór, Glasgow
22 June 2009 – 4 July 2009	Everything Must Go!	Various	Lisa Goldman & Esther Richardson	Soho Theatre, London
25 September 2013 – 19 October 2013	Dark Road	Black Fergus McLintock	Mark Thomson	Royal Lyceum Theatre, Edinburgh
6 April 2015 – 11 April 2015	Broth	Jimmy	Andy McNamme	Òran Mór, Glasgow
14 April 2015 – 18 April 2015	Broth	Jimmy	Andy McNamme	Traverse Theatre, Edinburgh
18 February 2016 – 19 March 2016	The Crucible	Deputy Governor Danforth	John Dove	Royal Lyceum Theatre, Edinburgh
20 April 2016 – 14 May 2016	The Iliad	Agamemnon / Priam	Mark Thomson	Royal Lyceum Theatre, Edinburgh
6 March 2017 – 11 March 2017	The Beaches of St Valery	Callum / McGregor / McLean	Stuart Hepburn	Òran Mór, Glasgow
11 August 2017 – 26 August 2017	Stand By		Joe Douglas	Summerhall, Edinburgh
12 November 2018 – 17 November 2018	Oscar Slater – The Trial That Shamed a City	Arthur Conan Doyle	Stuart Hepburn	Òran Mór, Glasgow
29 January 2019 – 1 February 2019	Rebus: Long Shadows	Inspector Rebus	Robin Lefevre	Theatre Royal, Glasgow
4 February 2019 – 9 February 2019	Rebus: Long Shadows	Inspector Rebus	Robin Lefevre	New Theatre, Cardiff
11 February 2019 – 18 February 2019	Rebus: Long Shadows	Inspector Rebus	Robin Lefevre	Cambridge Arts Theatre
25 February 2019 – 2 March 2019	Rebus: Long Shadows	Inspector Rebus	Robin Lefevre	Theatre Royal, Newcastle
4 March 2019 – 9 March 2019	Rebus: Long Shadows	Inspector Rebus	Robin Lefevre	Theatre Royal, Bath
12 March 2019 – 16 March 2019	Rebus: Long Shadows	Inspector Rebus	Robin Lefevre	Rose Theatre, Kingston
16 March 2020 – 17 March 2020 (Note: Closed early because of COVID-19 restrictions)	The Beaches of St Valery	Callum / McGregor / McLean	Stuart Hepburn	Òran Mór, Glasgow

== Radio ==
Date	Title	Role	Director	Station
22 December 1987 – 8 September 1988	Citizens	Alec Kelly	Marilyn Imrie	BBC Radio 4
25 January 2003 – 1 February 2003	The Falls	DI Rebus	Bruce Young	BBC Radio 4 The Saturday Play
26 June 2004 – 3 July 2004	Resurrection Men	DI Rebus	Bruce Young	BBC Radio 4 The Saturday Play
17 April 2006	McLevy: Sins of the Fathers	Bellamy	Patrick Rayner	BBC Radio 4 Afternoon Play
28 June 2008 – 5 July 2008	Black and Blue	DI Rebus	Bruce Young	BBC Radio 4 The Saturday Play
28 February 2009	Salmonella Men on Planet Porno			BBC Radio 3 The Wire
17 February 2010	Fags, Mags and Bags: Mr Majhu Goes to Lenzie	Bob Shandy MP		BBC Radio 4
7 August 2010 – 14 August 2010	Strip Jack	DI Rebus	Bruce Young	BBC Radio 4 The Saturday Play
11 November 2012 – 18 November 2012	The Black Book	DI Rebus	Bruce Young	BBC Radio 4 Classic Serial
28 September 2014 – 5 October 2014	Set in Darkness	DI Rebus	Bruce Young	BBC Radio 4 Classic Serial
13 February 2016 – 20 February 2016	A Question of Blood	DI Rebus	Bruce Young	BBC Radio 4 The Saturday Play
12 July 2018	The Trial of Joseph Knight	Sir John Wedderburn	Bruce Young	BBC Radio 4 Afternoon Drama
