= Raindog =

Scottish theatre company

Raindog is a Glasgow-based theatre company founded in 1990 by Robert Carlyle, Caroline Paterson, Alexander Morton, and others.

== Foundation ==
Raindog's first production, One Flew Over the Cuckoo's Nest, starring Alexander Morton as R.P McMurphy was received with great acclaim in 1991. Robert Carlyle won best director award. The stageplay was so popular that the theatre company produced another version two years later. Their second production, Macbeth, also starring Alexander Morton was equally successful. Robert Carlyle again won Best Director for his adaptation of Shakespeare's most famous play.

== Established era ==
Raindog was responsible for bringing Tommy Flanagan (Gladiator, Braveheart, Face/Off, Aliens vs. Predator) into public acclaim. Other actors such as Gary Lewis (Gangs of New York, Billy Elliot), Barbara Rafferty (The Last King of Scotland), Peter Mullan (Shallow Grave, Braveheart), Gavin Mitchell (Still Game), Kevin McKidd (Trainspotting), Caroline Paterson (EastEnders, King Ralph) and Stuart Davids (Hamish Macbeth) were active members of the company.

== Early productions ==
- One Flew Over the Cuckoo's Nest (starring Alexander Morton)
- Macbeth (starring Alexander Morton)
- Conquest of the South Pole (starring Robert Carlyle)
- One Flew Over the Cuckoo's Nest (2nd version, starring Alexander Morton)
- Wasted (starring Robert Carlyle, Tommy Flanagan & Alexander Morton)
- Slab Boys Trilogy (starring Robert Carlyle & Alexander Morton)
- Ecstasy (starring Robert Carlyle & Barbara Rafferty)
- Wasted 2 (starring Tommy Flanagan, Robert Carlyle & Alexander Morton)

== Closure ==
In February 2002, it was reported in The Scotsman that Raindog was closing due to lack of funds. Raindog had been receiving an SAC advancement grant, usually awarded to help improve the quality of output. However, a failure to win fixed-term funding of meant that the theater was unable to stay open due to monetary problems.
