= The Flood (Rankin novel) =

1986 novel by Ian Rankin

- First edition
- Author: Ian Rankin
- Language: English
- Publisher: Polygon
- Publication date: 1986
- Publication place: Scotland
- Media type: Print (hardback & paperback)
- Pages: 188 pp
- ISBN: 0-948275-09-X

The Flood is the first novel by crime writer Ian Rankin.

== Background ==
Rankin wrote The Flood between 1983 and 1984 while working on a doctorate in Scottish literature. It was published in 1986 by Polygon, a small Scottish press, with a print run of only a few hundred copies. It was reissued in 2005 to praise in The Times, although Rankin has spoken of being "embarrassed" at its "purple prose". Knots and Crosses came out the year after it was published.

== Plot summary ==
Mary Miller has always been an outcast. As a child, she fell into the hot burn – a torrent of warm chemical run-off from the local coal mine – and her hair turned white. Initially she was treated with sympathy, but that changed a few days later, when the young man who pushed her in died in an accident.

Now many years later, Mary is a single mother caught up in a faltering affair. Her son, Sandy, has fallen in love with a strange homeless girl. Both mother and son are forced to come to terms with a dark secret from Mary's past.
