= The Beat Goes On (short story collection) =

Inspector Rebus anthology by Ian Rankin

- First edition
- Author: Ian Rankin
- Language: English
- Series: Inspector Rebus
- Genre: Short stories
- Publisher: Orion Books
- Publication date: 2014
- Publication place: Scotland
- Media type: Print
- Pages: 611
- ISBN: 978-1-4091-5157-9

The Beat Goes On: The Complete Rebus Short Stories is an anthology of all the Inspector Rebus short stories (30) by Scottish crime writer Ian Rankin, plus the novella Death Is Not the End; though the Rebus short story "Well Shot" published in 2nd Culprit (1993) is not included. It is Rankin's third collection of short stories.

== History ==
Published in 2014, the paperback version published in 2015 includes two stories not in the hardback edition; a new story, "Cinders", written for Christmas 2014, and an old story from his files, "My Shopping Day", which was first published in Herbert in Motion and Other Stories (1997).

The first story, "Dead and Buried", is set in the mid-1980s when Rebus was "learning the ropes" at Summerhall Police Station. "The Very Last Drop" is set during a tour of a brewery immediately after Rebus's retirement in Exit Music, a retirement present from Siobhan Clarke who goes with him (written to be read aloud at a charity night at Edinburgh's Caledonian Brewery). "The Very Last Drop" was written to help the work of Royal Blind.

All the twelve Rebus stories in A Good Hanging and Other Stories are included: they cover a chronological year in Rebus's life; "Playback" in March, "A Good Hanging" in August during the Festival Fringe and "Auld Lang Syne" in December. Also included are the seven Rebus stories in Beggars Banquet, which has 14 other stories, 21 in total. There are six uncollected stories from magazines and newspapers, often for a Christmas issue so set in the festive season. There are two new stories, "The Passenger" and "A Three-Pint Problem".

In the preface and "Rankin on Rebus", Rankin discusses Rebus and writing him.

The book'scopyright information gives the year of first publication, and where published. Up till about 1997 they are ©Ian Rankin, and then they are ©John Rebus Limited.

In the notes, "AGH" indicates that the story was first published in A Good Hanging and Other Stories in 1992. "BB" indicates that the story was included in Beggars Banquet (2002), but these stories had been previously published elsewhere in magazines or newspapers.

Featured short stories:

Year	Title	Notes
2013	"Dead and Buried"	
1990	"Playback"	
1992	"The Dean Curse"	AGH
1992	"Being Frank"	AGH
1992	"Concrete Evidence"	AGH
1992	"Seeing Things"	AGH
1992	"A Good Hanging"	AGH
1992	"Tit For Tat"	AGH
1992	"Not Provan"	AGH
1992	"Sunday"	AGH
1992	"Auld Lang Syne"	AGH
1992	"The Gentlemen's Club"	AGH
1992	"Monstrous Trumpet"	AGH
1997	"My Shopping Day"	
1991	"Talk Show"	BB
1992	"Trip Trap"	BB
1993	"Castle Dangerous"	BB
1992	"In The Frame"	BB
1994	"Facing The Music"	BB
1995	"Window of Opportunity"	BB
1998	"Death Is Not the End"	BB
2000	"No Sanity Clause"	BB
2003	"Tell Me Who to Kill"	
2002	"Saint Nicked"	
2005	"Atonement"	
2005	"Not Just Another Saturday"	
2010	"Penalty Clause"	
2014	"The Passenger"	
2014	"A Three-Pint Problem"	
2010	"The Very Last Drop"	
2014	"Cinders"	
