= Charles Lawson =

Northern Irish actor (born 1959)

- Born: Quintin Charles Devenish Lawson; 17 September 1959 (age 67); Enniskillen, County Fermanagh, Northern Ireland
- Occupation: Actor
- Years active: 1981–present
- Television: Jim McDonald in Coronation Street

Quintin Charles Devenish Lawson (born 17 September 1959) is an actor from Northern Ireland. He is best known for playing Jim McDonald on the long running ITV soap opera Coronation Street.

== Early life and education ==
Charlie Lawson was born in September 1959 in Enniskillen, County Fermanagh, Northern Ireland, the son of Quintin Lawson, a businessman from County Tyrone, and his wife, Muriel (née Glennie), from County Fermanagh. Quintin was from Ardnafin in Strabane, West Tyrone, and was himself the son of Quintin Young Lawson, MBE, a prominent businessman in Strabane. The younger Quintin, Charlie's father, had served as a pilot with the Royal Air Force (RAF) in Burma during the latter stages of the Burma Campaign in the Second World War, attaining the rank of flight lieutenant. He moved to Enniskillen around 1948 to work at the then new Taylor-Woods factory, where he was soon promoted into management. Quintin eventually became the general manager of the factory, which was located at Derrychara in Enniskillen. Muriel Glennie, who married Quintin at Rossorry Church of Ireland Church on the outskirts of Enniskillen on 6 March 1954, was from Rossorry Terrace in Enniskillen. Upon their marriage, Quintin and Muriel settled at Derryinch, a townland on the northern edge of Enniskillen, where they raised their two children: a daughter, Mary, and a son, Charles (Charlie). Derryinch townland is directly opposite Devenish Island, the townland being directly south of the island. Quintin and Muriel later moved to Scotland in the mid- to late 1970s, where they spent the rest of their lives, eventually settling in Dumfries and Galloway in the south-west of Scotland.

Charlie was raised in a Protestant family, and was educated at Campbell College, a grammar school in Belfast, where he was a boarder. His father, Quintin Lawson, had also attended Campbell College. Charlie then trained as an actor at the Guildhall School of Music and Drama in London, where a classmate and good friend of his was fellow Enniskillen native Adrian Dunbar, who Lawson has said was the first Catholic he had ever met.

== Career ==
Lawson has appeared in three films and in at least twenty television productions. He was Jim McDonald (who is originally from Belfast) in the ITV television soap opera Coronation Street. He first appeared as Jim in 1989 and remained a regular character for the next 11 years, with sporadic appearances since then.

His other television work includes appearing as Seamus Duffryn in the 1982 Yorkshire Television thriller miniseries Harry's Game (also known as Belfast Assassin), and as one of the main characters, Billy, in Mike Leigh's television film Four Days in July, both based on The Troubles in Northern Ireland. He played Trigg in the 1989 television film The Firm. He has also appeared in various other television series including Doctors (twenty-four episodes), Bread (eleven episodes), The Bill (three episodes) and Rosemary & Thyme (one episode).

In 2000, Lawson made a programme for ITV Granada, Passion for Peace, which followed him back to Northern Ireland and reported on the creation of the Tim Parry Johnathan Ball Peace Centre in Warrington.

In 2005, Lawson appeared in the TV documentary Titanic: Birth of a Legend.

In 2009, Lawson appeared alongside an eight-foot Frankfurter sausage in a German television commercial, advertising hot dogs. His overdubbed catchphrase in the commercial is Betrachten Sie die Größe meiner Wurst! (English: "Look at the size of my sausage!").

In 2010, Lawson revealed that he would be returning to Coronation Street for its fiftieth anniversary celebrations. He speculated that bosses may be planning to kill his character off, however, this never happened. He stayed until April 2011. Lawson then returned for a three-month stint on the soap between August and November 2014. His brief return coincided with the imprisonment of Peter Barlow (Chris Gascoyne) after he was wrongly accused of murdering Tina McIntyre.

In 2015, Lawson made a guest appearance in an episode of the Comedy Central sitcom Brotherhood as the father of the three main characters. He also appeared as Doctor Black in the 2016 BBC drama My Mother and Other Strangers.

Lawson returned to Coronation Street in September 2018 with his supposed deceased daughter from his relationship with Liz.

Jim McDonald was killed-off, off screen, in 2026, Steve was contacted by Jim's ex and told that Jim has died of pneumonia. Lawson approved of the decision.

== Filmography ==
Television

Year	Title	Role	Note(s)
1982	Harry's Game	Seamus Duffryn	3 Episodes
1982	Joyce in June	Dossie Wright/Maxwell Cox	Television film
1983	Crown Court	Sandy Watson	1 Episode
1984	Four Days in July	Billy	Television film
1985	Hitler's S.S.: Portrait in Evil	S.S. Man	Television film
1985	Up the Elephant and Round the Castle	Military Police Corporal	1 episode
1986	Boon	Niall Mahoney	1 episode
1986	The Monocled Mutineer	Featured	Miniseries; 1 episode
1986–1989	Bread	Yizzel	11 Episodes
1987	Up Line	Tommy Burns	Miniseries; 3 episodes
1989	Screen Two	Cranham	1 episode
1989, 2002	The Bill	D.S. Picton/ Alan McCourt	3 episodes; 1 as Picton and 2 as McCourt
1989–2000, 2003–2005, 2007–2011, 2014, 2018	Coronation Street	Jim McDonald	1168 episodes
1989	The Firm	Trigg	Television Film
1990	4 Play	Joseph	1 episode
2003	In Deep	Mike Marshall	2 episodes
2003	Holby City	Brian Taylor	2 episodes
2003–2012	Doctors	Gary Davies/ Bill McQueen	25 episodes
2004	Dalziel and Pascoe	Charles Stubbs	2 episodes
2005	Titanic: Birth of a Legend	Alexander Carlisle	Television film
2006	Rosemary & Thyme	Bingham	1 episode
2006	Casualty	Stan Drinkwater	1 episode
2015	Brotherhood	Aidan Barrett	1 episode
2016	My Mother and Other Strangers	Doctor Black	2 episodes
2018	Dark Heart	Father Connolly	2 episodes

== Personal life ==
Lawson has been married three times, and has a daughter, Laura, from his first marriage to Suzie, which ended in divorce in 1994. His second marriage was to the makeup artist Lesley Bond, who died from hypothermia following a fall in 2010 sometime after they separated. He lives in Prestbury in Cheshire with his third wife, Debbie Stanley, having previously lived with her in Chester for a number of years.

Lawson is an Ulster Unionist. In a 2008 programme, he admitted to supporting the actions of loyalist paramilitaries during the Ulster Workers' strike in 1974.

On 8 October 2018, while portraying Inspector John Rebus in the play Rebus: Long Shadows in Edinburgh, Lawson suffered a minor stroke on stage, but recovered shortly afterwards. He claims the stroke left him with hearing and walking difficulties. He said, "I feel lucky to be alive, I was so scared I couldn't stop crying". He was subsequently replaced in the role by Ron Donachie.
