= John Rebus =

Fictional character in books by Ian Rankin

- Inspector Rebus character
- Ken Stott as Rebus in the 2000 television series
- First appearance: Knots and Crosses (1987)
- Created by: Sir Ian Rankin
- Portrayed by: John Hannah (Note: Rebus (2000-2001)); Ken Stott (Note: Rebus (2006-2007)); Richard Rankin (Note: BBC/Viaplay reboot (2024-present)); Alexander Morton (Note: Radio, 1999); Ron Donachie (Note: Radio and stage, 2003-2019); Charles Lawson (Note: Stage, 2018); John Michie (Note: Stage, 2023); Gray O'Brien (Note: Stage, 2024); Brian Cox (Note: 2020 short film)

In-universe information
- Title(s): Detective Sergeant; Detective Inspector
- Occupation: Police officer
- Family: Michael Rebus (brother)
- Spouse: Rhona (divorced)
- Children: Samantha Rebus (daughter)
- Origin: Cardenden, Fife, Scotland
- Nationality: Scottish

Detective Inspector John Rebus is the protagonist of the Inspector Rebus series of detective novels by the Scottish writer Sir Ian Rankin, which have been adapted for the stage, radio and television.

Rebus is introduced in Rankin's second novel Knots and Crosses (1987) as a Detective Sergeant in the Lothian and Borders Police in Edinburgh, Scotland. He is a misanthropic, deceitful, curmudgeonly and self-loathing ex-SAS serviceman who flouts authority and revels in "old-school" detective work; his flaws often exacerbated by both the nature of his occupation and his inclination to drink and smoke heavily. His partner, DC Siobhan "Shiv" Clarke, who first appears in The Black Book (1993), acts as his foil, protégé and trusted friend. She shares his workaholic tendencies, but is better versed in newer methods and technologies which Rebus avoids, and must often manage his unpredictable nature.

In adaptations for the stage, radio and screen, the character has been portrayed by numerous actors. These adaptations, like the novels, are mostly set in and around Edinburgh. In 2014, Rebus was ranked as the third-most popular Scottish literary character in an international poll.

== In the books ==
In the series of books and short stories by Ian Rankin, beginning with Knots and Crosses published in 1987, John Rebus is a detective in the Lothian and Borders Police, stationed in Edinburgh. After the first book, he is promoted from Detective Sergeant to Detective Inspector. (Note: In Let it Bleed, he is offered a promotion to Detective Chief Inspector, but in a rural area and so he asks that the promotion be given instead to a fellow officer whom he dislikes, just to get rid of him.) In novels published after his retirement at the end of Exit Music, Rebus continues to work with Lothian and Borders Police (Note: In 2013, the real-life Lothian and Borders police merged with other regional units into Police Scotland, and the confusion of the changes is reflected in Saints of the Shadow Bible.) either as a civilian or again as a police officer, but only in a temporary capacity.

=== Backstory ===
Knots and Crosses was originally written as a stand-alone, non-genre novel and presents the fullest portrait of Rebus as a literary character. He comes from the town of Cardenden in Fife (Rankin's own home town) where his parents are buried and where his only sibling Michael still lives. His father made a living as a stage hypnotist; Michael is also a success in the profession. John is divorced from Rhona and has a daughter, Samantha, who is nearly twelve.

Rebus went from school into the army and, after a difficult stint in Northern Ireland at the beginning of The Troubles, signed up for the SAS. There, he and another man were subjected to various kinds of torture in an attempt to see whether they would “break”. Rebus passed the test but, having had to abandon his companion, had a nervous breakdown himself. After recovering, he became a police detective. In Knots and Crosses he suffers from PTSD (unnamed), which is cured (Note: That is, Rebus has no more flashbacks or breakdowns in the subsequent novels, though he continues to drink heavily, anger easily, and have difficulty sleeping. In A Question of Blood, a psychiatrist, Irene Lesser, tells him that he “might want to talk to someone” about the mental “baggage” from his military years.) when his brother hypnotizes him.

In subsequent novels, more about Rebus’s background is revealed. In the first few novels, Rebus likes jazz music, but by the fourth one he admits to being partial to the Rolling Stones. From that point on, his favourite music is always folk and rock from his own youth; in addition to that of the author. In Fleshmarket Close, which deals with immigrant trafficking, Rebus recalls that his paternal grandfather was a Polish immigrant. In Dead Souls, he recalls his school-leaving party in Cardenden and his ill-fated plans to get a job and settle down with his childhood sweetheart.

Rebus lives in the flat he bought with his wife Rhona in the 1970s, on Arden Street in the Marchmont area of Edinburgh. During his relationship with Patience Aitken, he spends a lot of time at her flat and even rents his apartment out to students in The Black Book, though he has to move back in with them when Patience kicks him out. In The Falls, he has the flat rewired with an eye to selling it, but changes his mind. In A Song for the Dark Times, the garden flat in his own building has become vacant and he moves in as this will save him the difficult two-flight climb to his old flat.

Starting with Black and Blue, Rebus drives an older Saab 900. Before that, he had admired a Saab and wished he could afford one (in Strip Jack). In some of the later novels, he talks to the Saab, thanking it for making long trips, and he is relieved in A Song for the Dark Times when it can be repaired. In Even Dogs in the Wild, he acquires a dog, Brillo.

=== Age ===
As Rankin developed Knots and Crosses into a series of crime stories, he allowed Rebus’s life to continue as if he were living in real time. Thus, in Knots and Crosses (1987) his daughter Samantha is “nearly twelve” and in Tooth and Nail (1992) she is about sixteen. By the year 2000, Rankin was aware that Rebus was approaching 60, the age of compulsory retirement for police. Despite some indecision about Rebus’s actual age, Rankin settled on 1947 as the protagonist’s year of birth and 2007 as his year of retirement. More recently, since Rebus's retirement, Rankin has admitted that the character is no longer ageing in real time and that he imagines Rebus as being in his late sixties in 2020, with some disabilities but still physically as well as mentally capable.

Although it is possible to summarize Rebus’s character and habits, he changes over the years. Early on, for example, he is ambitious, but as time goes by he sees that promotion would take him away from the hands-on investigative style he loves. To take another example, although his relationship with his daughter Samantha is a matter of rare phone calls for over a decade, they have more frequent visits after her daughter Carrie is born. In Dead Souls, his reflexive bullying of paedophiles in earlier books (Note: In Tooth and Nail, Rebus taunts a paedophile who is a valuable police informer; in The Black Book, he chooses the paedophile Andrew McPhail as a tool against Cafferty, knowing how dangerous this role will be.) is gradually replaced by the realization that some of them, at least, have suffered abuse themselves.

=== Character and habits ===
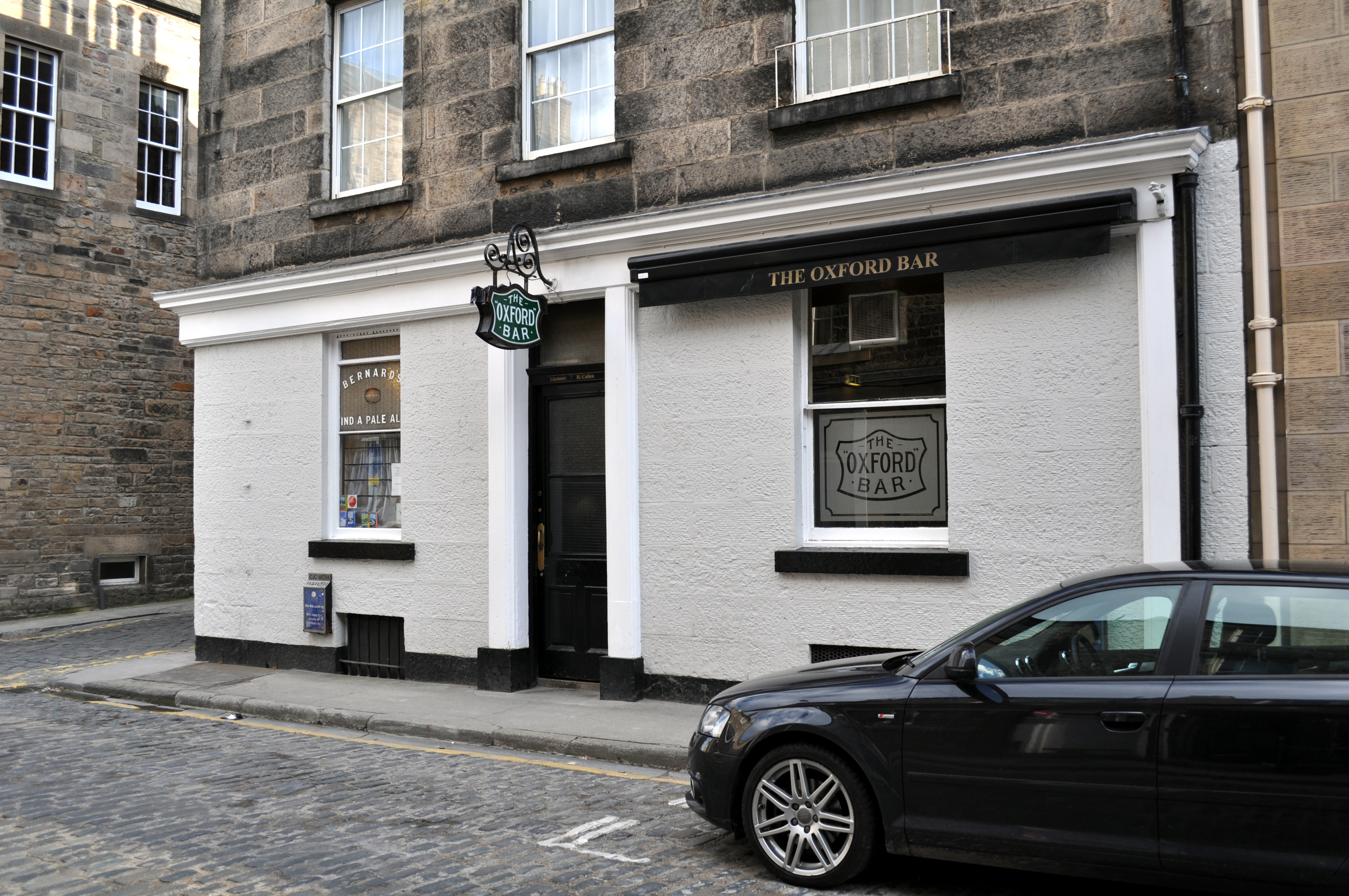
The real life Oxford Bar in Edinburgh's New Town, where Rebus is a regular patron

John Lanchester, in an article written originally for the London Review of Books in 2000, says of Rebus:

Stubbornness is Rebus's most deep-seated characteristic. All the various ways in which he could improve the quality of his life - which boil down essentially to his being less impossible - are somehow unthinkable. He stands in everybody else's way, but he stands in his own way too: difficult, determined, remorseless, honourable, honest, and proud of his lack of charm. He is a deeply Scottish self-image….

Melanie McGrath, in a review of Even Dogs in the Wild, takes a slightly different view:

… an intensely romanticised, self-dramatising lone wolf, a kind of urban cowboy driven to detection as a means of resolving his existential crisis. As Rebus himself puts it, if justice didn’t matter, “then neither did he”.

Rebus loves to make jokes at the expense of others, especially his superiors and his friends. At times he even examines his own parting words, judging whether they were clever enough. He spars verbally with Siobhan Clarke but also with ‘Big Ger’ Cafferty.

Rebus's sense of honour is questionable and he will lie to a witness swearing that “this is just between the two of us”, with no intention of keeping pertinent information private. He treats the criminal Cafferty’s influence and knowledge as a resource in his investigations and will sometimes do a favour for him. In Cafferty’s mind (and the minds of many others), Rebus belongs to him, but in Rebus’s own mind he is always fighting Cafferty and trying to collect evidence of his crimes.

Rebus is a heavy drinker and smoker, though always aware that this is bad for his health. He chooses to eat fried and/or fatty foods, knowing they are not good for him. His knowledge of Edinburgh bars and his appreciation of malt whiskies are encyclopaedic. Starting with Mortal Causes, his favourite hangout and meeting-place is the Oxford Bar, and from Exit Music to Rather Be the Devil, the ritual of going outside the bar to smoke is part of his routine. In Black and Blue, with the help of his old friend Jack Morton he stops drinking and is able to continue abstaining through the next book, The Hanging Garden. However, at the end of that novel Jack dies and Rebus resumes drinking. From one novel to another he may try to ration cigarettes, but he is not able to quit smoking entirely until he begins to suffer from COPD at the beginning of Rather Be the Devil — at that time he also begins to cut back on his drinking.

Music is important to Rebus, though he does not play an instrument himself. (Note: In part iii of the Prologue to Standing in Another Man’s Grave, Rebus thinks about not having learned to play the guitar.) He has an extensive collection of vinyl, augmented when his brother Michael dies and leaves him records from their youth (The Naming of the Dead). It is not until Mortal Causes, however, that his love of rock and folk from the 1960s and 70s is firmly established. In Black and Blue, The Hanging Garden, and Dead Souls, Rebus’s stream of consciousness is sometimes presented as a series of song and album names, which both identify and dismiss his emotional reactions to a situation. Starting with Set in Darkness, he plays a game with Siobhan Clarke of reciting song names and expecting her to identify them. Clarke gives him newer music to listen to, and forms opinions about his favourites, too. In A Song for the Dark Times, she tells their friend Fox,

”John says he wants it put on his gravestone: ‘He listened to the B-sides.’”

Books are important to him, but his interest tends to be aspirational; he struggles with the sense that he might (or might not) have done better if he had had better educational opportunities. Especially in the earlier novels, there are references to piles of unread books in his apartment, and to the fact that his wife Rhona, an English teacher, took many of the books originally in the apartment when she left him. Aside from Crime and Punishment, he doesn’t actually read much.

Rebus's interest in politics is informed by a deep scepticism. Rankin considers him to be "small-c conservative" and therefore unlikely to support political change; at one point in Strip Jack (1992), he tells his friends Brian and Nell that he has only voted three times in his life, "Once Labour, once SNP, and once Tory." On the other hand, when Scottish First Minister Nicola Sturgeon suggested in a public venue that Rebus would have voted pro-Brexit, Rankin was taken aback.

Rebus’s romantic life is varied. He has occasional one-night stands (Knots and Crosses, Black and Blue, and Set in Darkness), but his more durable relationships are with women who have a superior education to him, including his wife Rhona, DI Gill Templar, Dr. Patience Aitken, the museum curator Jean Burchill, and Professor Deborah Quant. His experiments in living with a woman (Rhona, Patience) are not successful. He can never put a woman’s needs before those of his current case and he is usually the one who gets left or dismissed. In A Song for the Dark Times, he and Deborah Quant are satisfied with being “friends with benefits".

His most enduring relationship is with Siobhan Clarke, but its romantic expression peaks with a single kiss at the end of A Question of Blood. Starting with Set in Darkness, Clarke ceases to be a mere helper or sidekick and any erotic element needs to be suppressed in order to maintain this new relationship, which is important to both of them. In Set in Darkness, Rebus defends her from a stalker and in the 2002-2004 sequence, Resurrection Men, A Question of Blood, and Fleshmarket Close, he is explicitly compared to a knight. She is sometimes mistaken for his daughter and in A Song for the Dark Times performs the daughterly task of helping him move house.

Around the time of retirement, and during the pandemic lockdown especially, Rebus's constant companion is a dog named Brillo. Brillo features prominently in A Heart Full of Headstones.

=== Career ===
Rebus’s early career must be retrospectively constructed from information in later books.

- Some time before 1976, he joined the police and, after some training, started out as a Detective Constable. His mentor then was DI Laurence Geddes (Black and Blue), who retired around 1976 after the Spaven Case.
- In 1984, DC Rebus moved to the fictional Summerhall station, where DI Stefan Gilmour was his mentor until Gilmour resigned due to a scandal (Saints of the Shadow Bible).
- In 1987, DS Rebus is based at the fictional Great London Road station, where he stays until 1993.
- In 1991, DI Rebus is under Chief Superintendent Watson (referred to as "The Farmer", but not to his face), who remains his superior officer until 1999 or so.
- In 1992, Rebus is sent to assist the Metropolitan Police in London on a serial killer case.
- By 1993, the CID team from Great London Road is moved to the real-life station at St Leonard’s (The Black Book). This remains DI Rebus’s station until about 2004.
- In 1994, DI Rebus is assigned temporarily to the Crime Squad at the Fettes Avenue Police Headquarters (Mortal Causes).
- In 1996, DI Rebus is offered a promotion to DCI, but in a rural area — he asks that it be given to DI Flower, his rival and enemy, to get him out of Edinburgh (Let it Bleed).
- In 1997, DI Rebus is assigned temporarily to the rough neighbourhood station at Craigmillar. His involvement in the 1976 Spaven case is under investigation.
- In 1998, DI Rebus is assigned to a committee to give advice on security for the new Scottish Parliament (Set in Darkness, 2000).
- In 2002, DI Rebus is sent on a course for difficult senior officers to keep them on track for their pensions, at Tulliallan Police College (Resurrection Men).
- From 2004-2007, DI Rebus and DS Clarke are assigned to the real-life Gayfield Square station. He is considered retirement age and is not welcome.
- In November 2007, DI Rebus retires, as is mandatory at the age of 60.
- In Standing in Another Man’s Grave (2012) John Rebus is working for SCRU, a unit that examines unsolved cold cases.
- In Saints of the Shadow Bible (2013), due to a change in the retirement regulations, Rebus has become a DS again, assigned to Gayfield Square, where Clarke is now a DI. He is the subject of suspicion for his stint at Summerhall in the 1980s.
- In novels after 2013, Rebus is definitively retired and his relationship with the police is at best that of a “Consulting Detective” (a la Sherlock Holmes) and at worst, an obnoxious pest.

As a policeman, Rebus develops into a maverick who keeps his investigations to himself as long as possible, but is relentless in using every means to solve a murder. He strives to build up as complete a picture as possible of the victims and suspects. Sometimes, he or others understand his obsessiveness as paranoia or conspiracy thinking, sometimes as solving a jigsaw puzzle. Early on, he is ambitious, but the role of Detective Inspector, in charge of a team but with considerable discretion to control an investigation, is not one he can trade for a more desk-bound and politically sensitive role.

He is also an example to others of the (bad) old-fashioned style of policeman. He is suspended from duties or asked to take a break in at least eight of the novels, usually for extreme insubordination or because he is literally trying to investigate his own past sins. (Note: The Black Book, Let it Bleed, Black and Blue, Set in Darkness, The Falls, A Question of Blood, The Naming of the Dead (Clarke is also suspended), Exit Music.) In Black and Blue, Rebus is haunted by a case from 1976 in which his first police mentor framed a man for murder and Rebus lied on the witness stand to support him. In Saints of the Shadow Bible (2013), Rebus recalls his time in Summerhall police station in the 1980s, among violent and corrupt police officers who still, in 2013, have much to hide. (Note: Rankin provided a sample of Rebus’s initiation at Summerhall in the short story “Dead and Buried”.)

Rebus likes to improvise a team that will agree on the nature of justice and both allow and critique the methods he uses to pursue it. Brian Holmes, Siobhan Clarke, and Ellen Wylie are some of the young officers he recruits over the years. His main ally and sounding-board is Siobhan Clarke, introduced in 1993’s The Black Book and given a larger role starting in 2000’s Set in Darkness. She represents a new generation of policing, able to incorporate some of Rebus’s passion into a cooler, more even-handed style. Malcolm Fox, the protagonist of two of Rankin’s novels and, in the later ones, a colleague of Clarke and Rebus, is yet another style of policeman, intensely self-controlled and aware of the law. After a successful career monitoring police ethics in the “complaints” unit, he comes to sympathize with Rebus’s need to defy orders in his investigations.

=== Historical observer ===
Rebus’s long career tracks a number of developments from 1987 to the present:

- Changes in police structure, policy, and procedures in Scotland as oversight and, eventually, centralization affect the situation of police officers in their work.
- Changes in Edinburgh, including gentrification, the influx of immigrants, the construction of the Scottish parliament and its effects on the property market, the institution of one-way streets, and the lengthy attempt to construct the tramway.
- Scottish politics, including the establishment of a Scottish Parliament, and the 2014 referendum on Scottish independence. Flashbacks and cold cases trigger memories of the 1979 referendum and the more violent period of partisanship that preceded it.
- The increasing reliance of the police (and also of everyday people) on data and electronic devices. Early on, computer screens and the HOLMES police database mystify Rebus (Black and Blue). When an email exchange is central to a case in The Falls, he lets his younger colleagues pursue that aspect of it. In A Question of Blood, he declares himself a “dinosaur” with respect to technology and literally smashes his cellphone when his call is not answered. In the same book, however, he gets hold of a laptop in order to view the webcam feed of a young, female cousin. Eventually though, he ends up relying on a mobile phone, texts, and search engines.

=== Influences ===
In his introduction to Rebus: The Early Years, Ian Rankin explains that part of the original inspiration for Rebus had to do with wanting to retell Robert Louis Stevenson’s classic horror story Strange Case of Dr Jekyll and Mr Hyde, with Rebus as Jekyll threatened by his evil alter ego from the past. The Jekyll and Hyde theme is explicit in the first three novels, but reappears throughout the series, often expressed by Rebus to himself as the relationship between Edinburgh’s “overworld and underworld.” As John Lanchester noted in 2000,

The aspect of the Jekyll and Hyde story which particularly interested Rankin was its portrayal of Edinburgh as a city of appearances and division, a place of almost structural hypocrisy.

Rebus can be said to belong to a long tradition of paternal Scottish hard men. A natural leader whose gruff exterior and fierce will to succeed in his field belies a benevolent nature. The character owes as much to the likes of Scottish football players Jock Stein and Bill Shankly as it does to a more obvious relation, the TV detective Jim Taggart. In an Independent on Sunday interview Rankin said that he drew "some of his inspiration" for the character from the "sixth Stone", Ian Stewart. Three of the Inspector Rebus books are named after Stones albums: Black and Blue, Let It Bleed and Beggars Banquet.

== List of stories ==
For a list of the novels and stories in which John Rebus appears, see Inspector Rebus Series: Publishing history

== Other media ==
=== TV ===
Plans were afoot in the late 1980s and early 1990s to bring Rebus to television in an adaptation of Knots and Crosses with Leslie Grantham in the lead role, but this did not materialise. Rankin believes that it was likely they would have made Rebus English, or relocated the entire story to London. Additionally, Rankin has revealed that the BBC were keen to cast Robbie Coltrane as Rebus in a mooted adaptation of the series in the 1990s. Rankin "smiled a bit", imagining flashbacks to Rebus's SAS training "with Private Robbie Coltrane running over the assault course!"

In the first season of the 2000 television adaptation, he is portrayed by John Hannah; a casting decision into which Hannah felt he was forced. His production company, Clerkenwell Films, produced the series alongside STV Studios, and his original suggestion for the role was Peter Mullan. However, he claimed the corporation would not commission a "relatively unknown" actor. In the later series, following Hannah and his production company's exit, the role was played by Ken Stott for the remainder of the series.

Many of Rebus' idiosyncracies are tweaked slightly in the adaptations. In the 2000-2007 television series, Rebus is shown to be a supporter of Hibernian F.C. like Siobhan Clarke; in the 2024 reboot, he describes himself as "a quiet Jambo". Neither of these facts are present in Rankin's books, and the author has stated that Rebus is in fact a supporter of Fife-based Raith Rovers F.C. Rebus's Fife accent is softened as well — in the novel Tooth and Nail, London Metropolitan Police colleagues find it difficult to understand his speech. However, Rebus's reliance on alcohol is in line with the books and he is often seen drinking in the Oxford Bar.

In November 2022, it was announced that Nordic streaming service Viaplay would produce a new Rebus adaptation, as the company's debut UK production. In March 2023, Richard Rankin (no relation to the author) was announced to star as Rebus. Following Viaplay's decision to withdraw from the UK market, the production was then acquired by the BBC. Episode 1 of the new series was aired on BBC Scotland on 17 May 2024, and in the wider UK on BBC One on 18th May 2024.

=== Radio ===
Alexander Morton played Rebus in a 1999 BBC Radio 4 adaptation of Let It Bleed.

Ron Donachie starred as Rebus in BBC Radio 4's dramatizations of The Falls (2008), Resurrection Men (2008), Strip Jack (2010), The Black Book (2012), Black and Blue (2013), Set in Darkness (2014), A Question of Blood (2016) and Fleshmarket Close (2017).

BBC Radio has also broadcast abridged readings of some novels, including Let It Bleed (read by Alexander Morton), of the novella Death Is Not the End (read by Douglas Henshall) and of the short story "Facing the Music" from Beggars Banquet (read by James MacPherson).

=== Stage ===
Rankin, with Rona Munro, wrote the stage play Rebus: Long Shadows which premiered at the Birmingham Repertory Theatre in September 2018 with Northern Irish actor Charles Lawson playing Rebus. Ron Donachie, who had frequently played the character for BBC Radio, took over the role for the 2019 run after Lawson suffered a minor stroke.

Rankin has since written a second play with Simon Reade. Entitled Rebus: A Game Called Malice, the production was premiered at the Queen's Theatre, Hornchurch on 2 February 2023 with John Michie playing Rebus. A new production of the play was performed at the Festival Theatre, Edinburgh in September 2024, with Gray O'Brien as Rebus.

=== Short film ===
In May 2020, Brian Cox played an older Rebus in the short film John Rebus: The Lockdown Blues for BBC Scotland's Scenes for Survival, which is set in a locked down Edinburgh during the COVID-19 pandemic. The film was written by Ian Rankin for the National Theatre of Scotland.
