= A Good Hanging and Other Stories =

- First edition
- Author: Ian Rankin
- Language: English
- Series: Inspector Rebus
- Genre: Detective fiction
- Published: 1992 (Century)
- Publication place: Scotland
- Media type: Print
- Pages: 253
- ISBN: 0-7126-5148-9

A Good Hanging and Other Stories is a collection of short stories by crime writer Ian Rankin.

It also exists as an audiobook, narrated by James MacPherson.

The collection features Ian Rankin's popular Detective Inspector Rebus. The collection is of 12 short stories set in Edinburgh, where Ian Rankin sets the majority of his novels.

Structure

These twelve Rebus stories cover a chronological year in his life; "Playback" in March, "A Good Hanging" in August during the Festival Fringe and "Auld Lang Syne" in December.

The stories:

- "Playback"
- "The Dean Curse"
- "Being Frank"
- "Concrete Evidence"
- "Seeing Things"
- "A Good Hanging"
- "Tit For Tat"
- "Not Provan"
- "Sunday"
- "Auld Lang Syne"
- "The Gentlemen's Club"
- "Monstrous Trumpet

== Reception ==
The book was favourably reviewed, with Kirkus Reviews referring to Rebus as: "probably the most interesting man in detective fiction," and concluding: "Are the stories as potent as the Rebus novels? No. But any time spent with Rebus is quality time.
