= Rebus: Long Shadows =

- Rehearsal script playtext
- Original language: English
- Written by: Ian Rankin; Rona Munro
- Series: Inspector Rebus
- Setting: Edinburgh

Premiere
- Date: 20 September 2018
- Place: Birmingham Repertory Theatre

Rebus: Long Shadows is a 2018 play written by Ian Rankin and Rona Munro. It is considered to be a part of Rankin's Inspector Rebus series, and was written specifically for the stage.

The play received its world premiere at the Birmingham Repertory Theatre on 20 September 2018, before embarking on a UK tour.

The rehearsal script playtext was published by Orion in Hardback on 20 September 2018, coinciding with the premiere of the play.

== Production ==
The production is directed by Robin Lefevre, designed by Ti Green, lighting designed by Chahine Yavroyan and Simon Bond, composed by Garth McConaghie, assistant direction by Madeleine Kludje and fight direction by Alison de Burgh.

The play premiered at the Birmingham Repertory Theatre, running from 20 September to 6 October 2018 before touring to King’s Theatre, Edinburgh (8 to 13 October), Malvern Theatres (15 to 20 October), Theatre Royal, Nottingham (22 to 27 October), Manchester Opera House (29 October to 3 November), Royal & Derngate Northampton (5 to 10 November), His Majesty’s Theatre, Aberdeen (12 to 17 November) and Yvonne Arnaud Theatre, Guildford (19 to 24 November). It starred Charles Lawson as Rebus, Cathy Tyson as Siobhan Clarke and John Stahl as Cafferty.

The play continued touring the UK in 2019 beginning at the Theatre Royal, Glasgow (29 January to 2 February), New Theatre, Cardiff (4 to 9 February), Cambridge Arts Theatre (11 to 18 February), Theatre Royal, Newcastle (25 February to 2 March), Theatre Royal, Bath (4 to 9 March) and Rose Theatre, Kingston (12 to 16 March). Ron Donachie took over the role of Rebus from Lawson, having previously played the character for many years in the BBC Radio adaptations of the novels.

== Cast and characters ==
Character	2018 premiere	2019 tour
John Rebus	Charles Lawson	Ron Donachie
Siobhan Clarke	Cathy Tyson	Cathy Tyson
Cafferty	John Stahl	John Stahl
Mordaunt / Andy / Barman / Charlie / Technician	Neil McKinven	Neil McKinven
Angela	Dani Heron	Dani Heron
Heather / Maggie	Eleanor House	Eleanor House
