= Westwind (novel) =

Novel by Ian Rankin

- First edition
- Author: Ian Rankin
- Language: English
- Genre: Thriller
- Publisher: Barrie & Jenkins
- Publication date: 1990
- Publication place: Scotland
- Media type: Print (hardcover)
- Pages: 224 pp
- ISBN: 0-7126-3626-9

Westwind is a 1990 thriller novel written by Ian Rankin. It is one of the author's earliest works.

== Background ==
Rankin has spoken of his early disillusionment with Westwind, saying that he had been asked to rework it so often that by the end he no longer felt like his work at all. Of this period he says: "I decided it would rest in a dark corner of my consciousness, never to see the light of day again." However, after re-reading the novel following praise from a fan, he decided to re-release it in 2019, with some small editing changes.

== Plot summary ==
The Zephyr computer system monitors the progress of the United Kingdom's only spy satellite. When this system briefly goes offline, the book's main characters Hepton and Dreyfuss (the sole survivor of a space shuttle crash) have the only key to the enigma that must be solved if both men are to stay alive.

== Release details ==
- 1991, UK, Ulverscroft Large Print Books Ltd; large print edition (September 1991) (ISBN 0708925057, ISBN 978-0-7089-2505-8); hardback (first edition); hardcover: 480 pages

The book was reissued, with slight modifications, in November 2019.

== Reception ==
The 2019 reissue of the novel was largely well-received, with reviewers commenting on the prescient theme. Kirkus Reviews called it: "A fast-paced blast from the past...and (who knows?) maybe the immediate future as well," although Publishers Weekly was less complimentary, considering it "strictly for Rankin completists."

== Bibliography ==
- Rankin, Ian (1990). Westwind. Ulverscroft. ISBN 0-7089-2505-7.
