= Quick Reads Initiative =

British book initiative/charity

Quick Reads are short books by bestselling authors and celebrities, delivered by UK charity The Reading Agency. With no more than 200 pages, they are designed to encourage adults who do not read often or find reading difficult to discover the joy of books.

Quick Reads are used as a resource for adult literacy teaching and have been used in Skills for Life and ESOL classes in colleges, community centres, libraries, prisons and workplaces. They have also been used in hospitals, stroke recovery units, dyslexia centres, care homes, family learning groups, pre-schools, organisations working with homeless people and traveller communities, and Army and RAF bases. Quick Reads provide a route into reading that prioritises great story telling and adult-focused content while ensuring the books are written in an accessible and easy to read style.

In 2018, the program was due to end because of a lack of funding. Jojo Moyes offered the group an additional three years of funding.

== History ==
Quick Reads were launched in the UK and Ireland by the then Prime Minister Tony Blair on World Book Day 2006. Quick Reads has collaborated with over 30 publishers and produced over 140 titles since 2006, with over 5 million copies distributed, and over 6 million library loans.

Featured authors have included Graham Norton, Jojo Moyes, Dr Alex George, Anne Cleeves, Ian Rankin, Benjamin Zephaniah, Gordon Ramsay, Chris Ryan, Danny Wallace, Andy McNab, Ricky Tomlinson, John Simpson, Colin Jackson, Scott Quinnell, Adele Parks, Kerry Katona, Minette Walters, Joanna Trollope, Alvin Hall, and Rolf Harris. The initiative also features seven books based on the popular Doctor Who series. Information on recent titles can be found on The Reading Agency's website.

== Sale ==
Quick Reads are available from supermarkets, bookshops and online retailers for £1. They can also be ordered direct from publishers and wholesalers.

In 2025, charities, social enterprises, prisons, food banks, hospital libraries, workplaces and other community-based organisations were able to pre-order the Quick Reads books with a 30% discount at the Quick Reads shop.

== World Book Night ==
In 2025, Quick Reads were gifted as part of World Book Night, The Reading Agency’s annual drive to create a nation of readers, on 23 April 2025.

World Book Night gifting in 2025 took place via partnerships between local organisations and public libraries. Thousands of Quick Reads were handed out through public libraries to community organisations across the UK, including food banks, homeless shelters, prisons, and workplaces.

In April 2024, The Reading Agency organised a mass "read-in" in Bradford ahead of World Book Night, during which one thousand Quick Reads books were distributed to the public free of charge. The event took place at The Wool Exchange Waterstones and was supported by Bradford 2025 UK City of Culture. Members of the public were encouraged to take time during the lunch hour to read their free books. Author Matt Cain, one of the 2024 Quick Reads contributors, attended the event, reading from his work and signing copies for attendees.
