= Ian Rankin =

Scottish crime writer (born 1960)

Sir Ian Rankin OBE DL FRSE FRSL FRIAS
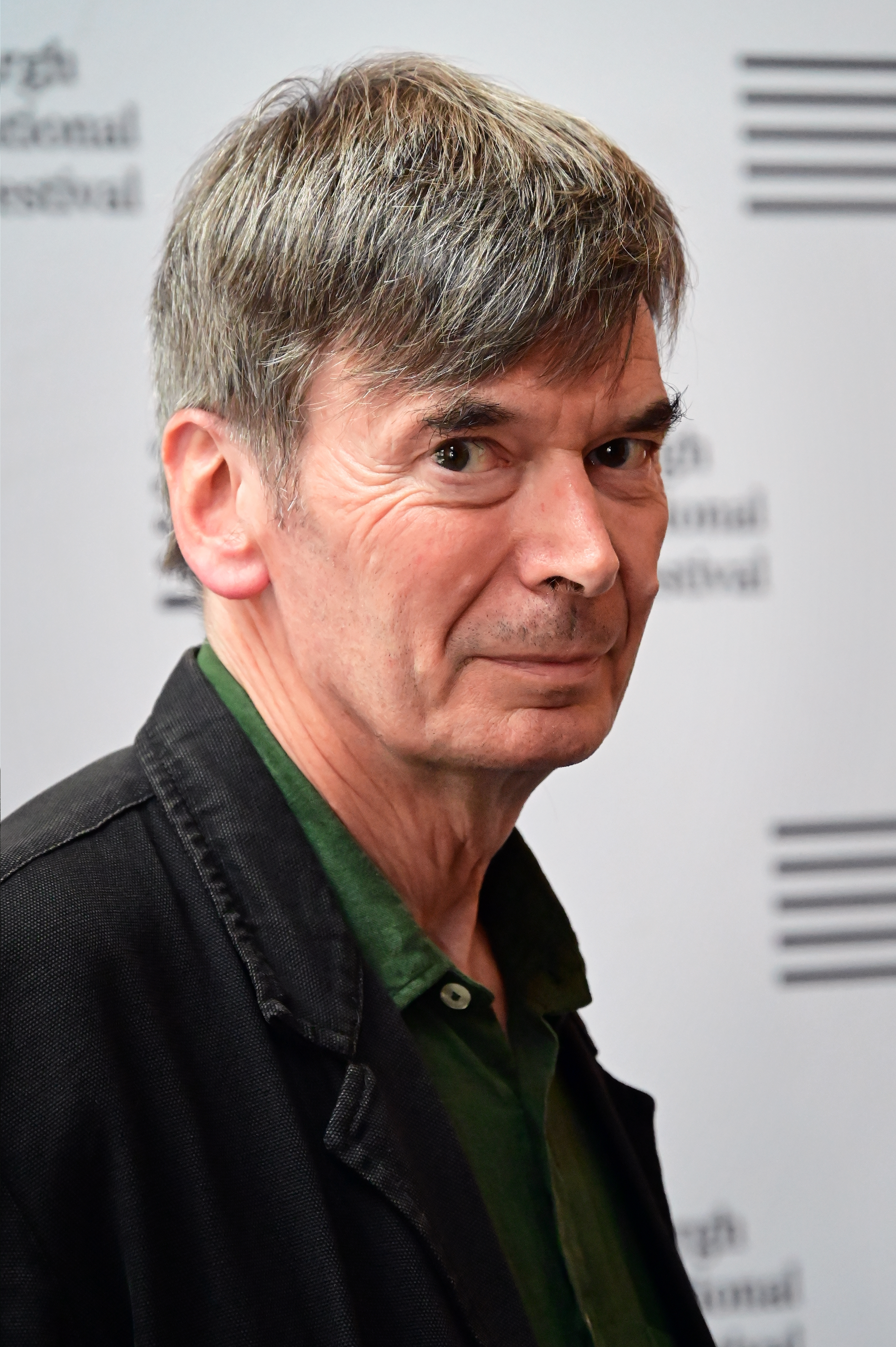
- Rankin in 2026
- Born: Ian James Rankin; 28 April 1960 (age 66); Cardenden, Fife, Scotland
- Education: University of Edinburgh
- Occupations: Crime writer; philanthropist
- Spouse: Miranda Harvey (m. 1986)
- Children: 2
- Writing career
- Pen name: Jack Harvey
- Period: 1984–present
- Genre: Crime fiction
- Notable works: DI John Rebus novels Malcolm Fox novels Dark Entries
- Sir Ian Rankin's voice from the BBC programme Desert Island Discs, 6 November 2011.
- Website: ianrankin.net

Sir Ian James Rankin OBE DL FRSE FRSL FRIAS (born 28 April 1960) is a Scottish crime writer and philanthropist, best known for his Inspector Rebus novels.

Born in Fife, Rankin was the first of his family to attend university, and he worked in a number of different jobs before becoming a writer. Rankin's crime novels form a major contribution to the tartan noir genre, and have won numerous domestic and international awards. His Rebus books have sold over 35 million copies; the first entry, Knots and Crosses (1987) was named the eighth-best Scottish novel of all time in a 2016 poll. (Note: The poll was conducted by BBC Scotland in partnership with the Scottish Book Trust and the Scottish Library and Information Council.)

== Early life ==
Rankin was born in Cardenden, Fife. His father, James, owned a grocery shop, and his mother, Isobel, worked in a school canteen. He was educated at Beath High School, Cowdenbeath. Neither of his parents was a great reader, but Rankin enjoyed comics such as the Beano, the Dandy, Superman and Batman, later progressing to books borrowed from the library.

Rankin was the first of his family to go to university. His parents were horrified when he chose to study literature, as they had expected him to study for a trade. Encouraged by his English teacher, he persisted and graduated in 1982 from the University of Edinburgh. There he also worked on a doctorate on Muriel Spark but did not complete it.

He has taught at the university and retains an involvement with the James Tait Black Memorial Prize. He lived in Tottenham, London, for four years and then rural France for six while he developed his career as a novelist.

Before becoming a full-time novelist, he worked as a grape picker, swineherd, taxman, alcohol researcher, hi-fi journalist, college secretary and punk musician in a band called the Dancing Pigs.

== Career ==
Rankin did not set out to be a crime writer. He thought his first novels, Knots and Crosses and Hide and Seek, were mainstream books, more in keeping with the Scottish traditions of Robert Louis Stevenson and even Muriel Spark. He was disconcerted by their classification as genre fiction. The Scottish novelist Allan Massie, who tutored Rankin while Massie was writer-in-residence at the University of Edinburgh, reassured him by saying, "Do you think John Buchan ever worried about whether he was writing literature or not?"

Rankin's Inspector Rebus novels are set mainly in Edinburgh. They are considered major contributions to the tartan noir genre. Thirteen of the novels—plus one short story—were adapted as a television series on ITV, starring John Hannah as Rebus in series 1 and 2 (4 episodes) and Ken Stott in that role in series 3–5 (10 episodes). Rankin has stated that the name of John Rebus was chosen partly in homage to fictional detective John Shaft, and because "rebus" is a kind of puzzle.

Rankin has spoken in interview of how the death of his mother led to his writing his Rebus novels. He says:

...you are looking at the human condition, you're trying to answer some very big questions about how the way the world is and the way human beings are so it is possible that my mum dying got me thinking in those terms.

In 2009, Rankin donated the short story "Fieldwork" to Oxfam's Ox-Tales project, four collections of UK stories written by 38 authors. Rankin's story was published in the Earth collection.

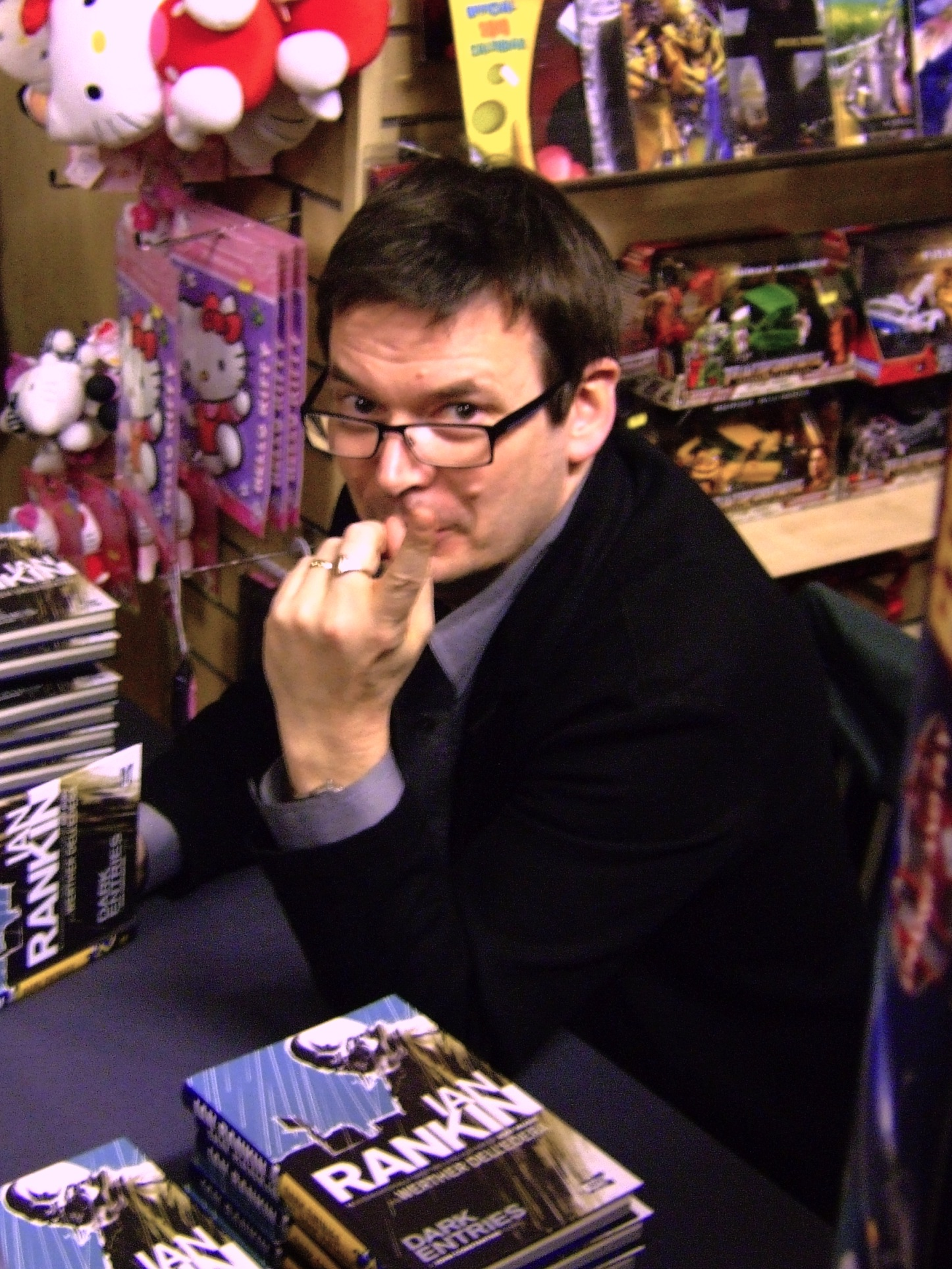
Rankin signing copies of his debut graphic novel, Dark Entries, in the Edinburgh Forbidden Planet International store in December 2009

In 2009 Rankin stated on BBC Radio 5 Live that he would start work on a five- or six-issue run on the comic book Hellblazer, although he may turn the story into a stand-alone graphic novel instead. The Vertigo Comics panel at WonderCon 2009 confirmed that the story would be published as a graphic novel, Dark Entries, the second release from the company's Vertigo Crime imprint.

In 2013, Rankin co-wrote the play Dark Road with Mark Thomson, the artistic director of the Royal Lyceum Theatre. The play, which marked Rankin's play-writing debut, premiered at the Lyceum Theatre, Edinburgh, in September 2013.

In 2005, Rankin became the tenth best-selling writer in Britain, accounting for 10% of all crime fiction sold. His Rebus books have sold over 35 million copies.

He also wrote three non-Rebus crime novels in 1993-95 under the pseudonym Jack Harvey.

In 2021, Rankin helped finish a draft by William McIlvanney, a prequel telling the story of an early case of McIlvanney's fictional detective Jack Laidlaw. McIlvanney, whom Rankin admires, had died in 2015 leaving the manuscript unfinished. It was published under the name The Dark Remains.

In 2022, Rankin signed a deal with publisher Orion to write two new John Rebus novels. Later that year, he received a knighthood from HM Queen Elizabeth II for services to literature and charity as part of her Birthday Honours List.

In August 2025, Rankin was a guest on the Off the Shelf podcast as part of a feature on the McIlvanney Prize.

Rankin is scheduled to interview John Grisham as part of the 2026 Edinburgh International Book Festival; this will be Grisham's first appearance at the Festival.

== Documentaries ==
Rankin is a regular contributor to the BBC Two arts programme Newsnight Review. His three-part documentary series on the subject of evil was broadcast on Channel 4 in December 2002. In 2005 he presented a 30-minute documentary on BBC Four called Rankin on the Staircase, in which he investigated the relationship between real-life cases and crime fiction. It was loosely based on the Michael Peterson murder case, as covered in Jean-Xavier Lestrade's documentary series Death on the Staircase. The same year, Rankin collaborated with folk musician Jackie Leven on the album Jackie Leven Said.

In 2007, Rankin appeared in programmes for BBC Four exploring the origins of his alter-ego character, John Rebus. In these, titled "Ian Rankin's Hidden Edinburgh" and "Ian Rankin Investigates Dr Jekyll and Mr Hyde," Rankin looks at the origins of the character and the events that led to his creation.

In the TV show Anthony Bourdain: No Reservations, he takes a trip through Edinburgh with writer/cook Anthony Bourdain.

He appeared in The Amber Light, a 2019 documentary film about Scotch whisky.

== Music ==
Rankin has a deep interest in music, and has used references to songs and album titles in many of his novels and chapter headings.

Rankin is the singer in the six-piece band Best Picture, formed by journalists Kenny Farquharson (The Times) and Euan McColl (The Scotsman) in 2017, and featuring Bobby Bluebell on guitar. They released the single "Isabelle" on Oriel Records in October 2017. They made their live debut at the Kendal Calling music festival on 28 July 2018. In an interview with The Guardian, Rankin says: "I am, of course, a frustrated rock star – I'd much rather be a rock star than a writer. Or own a record shop."

== Personal life ==
Rankin lives in Edinburgh with his wife, Miranda (née Harvey), whom he met at university and married in 1986, and their two sons: Jack and Kit. He has acknowledged the assistance the family gets from Forward Vision in Edinburgh in looking after Kit and other young adults with special needs.

The family lived for a number of years in the Merchiston area, near the authors J. K. Rowling, Alexander McCall Smith and Kate Atkinson, before moving to a penthouse flat in the former Edinburgh Royal Infirmary building in Quartermile in Lauriston in 2019. The couple also own a house in Cromarty in the Scottish Highlands.

Rankin appears as a character in McCall Smith's 2004 novel, 44 Scotland Street.

In 2011, a group of ten book sculptures were deposited around Edinburgh as gifts to cultural institutions and the people of the city. Many of the sculptures made reference to the work of Rankin, and an eleventh sculpture was a personal gift to him.

In 2019, Rankin donated his personal archives to the National Library of Scotland after moving to his flat in the Quartermile. The Library planned an exhibition for 2021 of highlights from the archive, which includes research notes, newspaper clippings and manuscripts.

Rankin has donated a considerable portion of his earnings to charity. In 2007, he and his wife set up a trust to support charities in the fields of health, art and education. In 2020, it was reported that he had donated around £1 million to the trust in the previous five years, with £200,000 being donated in 2019. In 2022, he donated rare first editions of three of his early works, valued at a total of £1,850, to a book sale in aid of Christian Aid.

== Honours and awards ==
Rankin was appointed Officer of the Order of the British Empire (OBE) in 2002 for services to literature and knighted in the 2022 Birthday Honours for services to literature and charity.

- 1988 Elected Hawthornden Fellow
- 1991 Chandler-Fulbright Award
- 1994 CWA Short Story Dagger for A Deep Hole
- 1996 CWA Short Story Dagger for Herbert in Motion in Perfectly Criminal
- 1997 CWA Gold Dagger for Fiction for Black and Blue
- 1997 Edgar Award for best novel, shortlist, Black and Blue
- 1998 Inducted into the prestigious Detection Club
- 1999 University of Abertay Dundee honorary doctorate
- 2000 University of St Andrews honorary doctorate
- 2000 Palle Rosencrantz Prize (Denmark)
- 2003 University of Edinburgh honorary doctorate
- 2003 Whodunnit Prize (Finland)
- 2003 Grand Prix du Roman Noir (France)
- 2004 Edgar Award for Resurrection Men
- 2005 CWA Lifetime Achievement Award (Cartier Diamond Dagger)
- 2005 Open University honorary doctorate
- 2005 Grand Prix de Littérature Policière (France) for Set in Darkness
- 2005 Deutsche Krimi Prize (Germany), for Resurrection Men
- 2006 University of Hull honorary doctorate
- 2007 The Edinburgh Award
- 2008 ITV3 Crime Thriller Award for Author of the Year, for Exit Music.
- 2009 Theakston's Old Peculier Crime Novel of the Year Award, shortlisted Exit Music
- 2012 Specsavers National Book Award, Outstanding Achievement
- 2015 Elected a Fellow of the Royal Society of Edinburgh
- 2016 UNESCO City of Literature Visiting Professor at University of East Anglia
- 2016 RBA Prize for Crime Writing for Even Dogs in the Wild, the world's most lucrative crime fiction prize, at €125,000
- 2016 Elected a Fellow of the Royal Society of Literature
- 2025 Venice Noir Award

== Works ==
As of 2024, Rankin has published 25 novels, two short-story collections, one original graphic novel, one novella, and a non-fiction book. He has also written a Quick Reads title.

Year	Novel	Rebus	Fox	Notes
1986	The Flood			Rankin's 1st novel
1987	Knots and Crosses	1		First Inspector Rebus novel
1988	Watchman			
1990	Westwind			
1990	Hide and Seek	2		
1992	Tooth and Nail	3		
1992	Strip Jack	4		
1992	A Good Hanging and Other Stories			Short stories
1993	Witch Hunt			Writing as Jack Harvey
1993	The Black Book	5		
1994	Bleeding Hearts			Writing as Jack Harvey
1994	Mortal Causes	6		
1995	Blood Hunt			Writing as Jack Harvey
1995	Let it Bleed	7		
1997	Black and Blue	8		Won Macallan Gold Dagger for Fiction
1997	Herbert in Motion & Other Stories			Limited edition chapbook with 4 stories, 2 original to this collection
1998	The Hanging Garden	9		
1999	Dead Souls	10		
2000	Set in Darkness	11		
2001	The Falls	12		
2002	Resurrection Men	13		Won The Edgar Award
2002	Beggars Banquet			Short stories
2003	A Question of Blood	14		
2004	Fleshmarket Close	15		
2005	Rebus's Scotland: A Personal Journey			Non-fiction — Awarded CWA Cartier Diamond Dagger
2005	The Complete Short Stories			Short stories; omnibus including the contents of A Good Hanging & Other Stories and Beggar's Banquet plus one new story, "Atonement"
2006	The Naming of the Dead	16		
2007	Exit Music	17		Won ITV3 Crime Thriller Award
2008	Doors Open			
2009	A Cool Head			Quick Reads 2009
2009	The Complaints		1	First Malcolm Fox novel
2009	Dark Entries			Vertigo Crime featuring John Constantine
2011	The Impossible Dead		2	
2012	Standing in Another Man's Grave	18	3	First novel with both Inspector Rebus and Malcolm Fox
2013	Saints of the Shadow Bible	19	4	
2014	Dark Road			Stage play, with Mark Thomson
2014	The Beat Goes On: The Complete Rebus Stories			Short stories
2015	Even Dogs in the Wild	20	5	
2016	The Travelling Companion			Limited edition bibliomystery; No 26 in a series of short stories by crime writers, Death Sentences
2016	Rather Be the Devil	21	6	
2018	Rebus: Long Shadows			Stage play, with Rona Munro (part of the Inspector Rebus series)
2018	In a House of Lies	22	7	
2020	A Song for the Dark Times	23	8	
2022	A Heart Full of Headstones	24	9	
2024	Midnight and Blue	25	10	
2026	The Heights			A non-Rebus novel set in London

== Other publications ==
Edited anthology

- Criminal Minded (2000) (edited and with an introduction by Rankin)

Recordings

- Jackie Leven Said (Cooking vinyl, 2005), with Jackie Leven
- The Sixth Stone (CD, 2007), with Aidan Moffat, on Ballads of the Book
- This Has Been the Death of Us (7th Realm Of Teenage Heaven, 2009), with Saint Jude's Infirmary
- The Third Gentleman (BBC Broadcast, 25 October 1997. 87mins). Black comedy set in 1790s Edinburgh.
- The Deathwatch Journal (Audiobook / BBC Broadcast, 2017. 75mins). Read by Jimmy Chisholm.

Graphic novels

- Dark Entries (September 2009) with art by Werther Dell'Edera. Published by Vertigo Crime and starring John Constantine of Hellblazer.

Graphic novella

- The Lie Factory, illustrated by Tim Truman. Published as part of a CD package, Kickback City, featuring Rory Gallagher songs fictionalized in the novella and with narration by Aidan Quinn.

Opera

- Gesualdo, with Craig Armstrong (2008)

Short stories

- "Summer Rites" (1984) (published in Cencrastus, No. 18 - actually a section of Rankin's first novel)
- "An Afternoon" (1984) (published in New Writing Scotland No. 2) (slightly revised version published in OxCrimes, 2014)
- "Voyeurism" (1985) (published in New Writing Scotland No. 3)
- "Colony" (1986) (published in New Writing Scotland No. 4)
- "Scarab" (1986) (published in Scottish Short Stories 1986)
- "Territory" (1987) (published in Scottish Short Stories 1987)
- "Remembrance" (1988) (published in Cencrastus, Spring)
- "Playback" (1990) (Rebus; published in Winter's Crime 22; reprinted in A Good Hanging & Other Stories, 1992)
- "Talk Show" (1991) (Rebus; published in Winter's Crimes 23)
- "The Dean Curse" (1992) (Rebus; published in A Good Hanging & Other Stories)
- "Being Frank" (1992) (Rebus; published in A Good Hanging & Other Stories)
- "Concrete Evidence" (1992) (Rebus; published in A Good Hanging & Other Stories)
- "Seeing Things" (1992) (Rebus; published in A Good Hanging & Other Stories)
- "A Good Hanging" (1992) (Rebus; published in A Good Hanging & Other Stories)
- "Tit for Tat" (1992) (Rebus; published in A Good Hanging & Other Stories)
- "Not Provan" (1992) (Rebus; published in A Good Hanging & Other Stories)
- "Sunday" (1992) (Rebus; published in A Good Hanging & Other Stories)
- "Auld Lang Syne" (1992) (Rebus; published in A Good Hanging & Other Stories)
- "The Gentlemen's Club" (1992) (Rebus; published in A Good Hanging & Other Stories)
- "Monstrous Trumpet" (1992) (Rebus; published in A Good Hanging & Other Stories)
- "In the Frame" (1992) (Rebus; published in Winter's Crimes 24)
- "Trip Trap" (1992) (Rebus; published in 1st Culprit)
- "Marked for Death" (1992) (published in Constable New Crimes 1)
- "Well Shot" (1993) (Rebus; published in 2nd Culprit; not included in the UK and US editions of The Beat Goes On: The Complete Rebus Stories)
- "Video, Nasty" (1993) (published in Constable New Crimes 2)
- "Castle Dangerous" (1993) (Rebus; published in Ellery Queen's Mystery Magazine, EQMM, October)
- "Someone Got to Eddie" (1994) (published in 3rd Culprit)
- "Facing the Music" (1994) (Rebus; published in Midwinter Mysteries 4)
- "A Deep Hole" (1994) (published in London Noir)
- "The Serpent's Back" (1995) (published in Midwinter Mysteries 5)
- "Adventures in Babysitting" (1995) (published in No Alibi and in Master's Choice Two)
- "Principles of Accounts" (1995) (published in EQMM, August)
- "Window of Opportunity" (1995) (Rebus, published in EQMM, December)
- "Natural Selection" (1996) (published in Fresh Blood)
- "Herbert in Motion" (1996) (published in Perfectly Criminal)
- “Playback and talk show: new Edinburgh crimes by Ian Rankin edited with exercises and notes by Yozo Muroya and Paul Hullah” (1996) (published in Japan by University Education Press)
- "The Wider Scheme" (1996) (published in EQMM, August)
- "My Shopping Day" (1997) (Rebus; published in Herbert in Motion & Other Stories [limited edition chapbook of 200 copies]; not included in the UK edition of The Beat Goes On: The Complete Rebus Stories, but included in the U.S. edition)
- "No. 79" (1997) (published in Herbert in Motion & Other Stories)
- "Glimmer" (1998) (published in Blue Lightning)
- "Unknown Pleasures" (1998) (published in Mean Time)
- "Detective Novels: The Pact Between Authors and Readers" (1998) (article; published in The Writer, December)
- "Death is Not the End" (1998) (novella later expanded into Dead Souls)
- "The Missing" (1999) (published in Crime Wave, March)
- "Get Shortie" (1999) (Rebus; published in Crime Wave 2, Deepest Red, June; not included in the UK and US editions of The Beat Goes On: The Complete Rebus Stories)
- "The Acid Test" (1999) (Rebus; published in EQMM, August; not included in the UK and US editions of The Beat Goes On: The Complete Rebus Stories)
- "The Hanged Man" (1999) (published in Something Wicked (UK) and EQMM, September/October)
- "The Only True Comedian" (2000) (published in EQMM, February)
- "Unlucky in Love, Unlucky at Cards" (2000) (published in EQMM, March)
- "The Confession" (2000) (published in EQMM, June)
- "The Slab Boys" (2000) (published in Scenes of Crime)
- "No Sanity Clause" (2000) (Rebus; originally titled "Father Christmas's Revenge", published in The Daily Telegraph, December)
- "Tell Me Who to Kill" (2003) (Rebus; published in Mysterious Pleasures)
- "Saint Nicked" (2003/2004) (Rebus; published in The Radio Times, 21 December 2003 & 4 January 2004)
- "Soft Spot" (2005) (published in Dangerous Women)
- "Showtime" (2005) (published in One City)
- "Not Just another Saturday" (August 2005) (Rebus; written for SNIP, a charity organisation; people in attendance of the event were provided with a "typescript" of the story)
- "Atonement" (2005) (Rebus; written for the anthology Complete Short Stories, which combined the contents of A Good Hanging & Other Stories and Beggar's Banquet, but was far from "Complete")
- "Sinner: justified" (2006) (published in Superhumanatural)
- "Graduation Day" (2006) (published in Murder in the Rough)
- "Fieldwork" (2009) (published in Ox-Tales)
- "Penalty Clause" (2010) (Rebus; published in Mail on Sunday, December)
- "The Very Last Drop" (2013) (Rebus; written to read aloud at an Edinburgh charity event to help the work of Royal Blind; published in the US and UK editions of The Beat Goes On: The Complete Rebus Stories)
- "Dead and Buried" (2013) (Rebus; published with Saints of the Shadow Bible)
- "In the Nick of Time" (2014) (Rebus; published in Face Off)
- "The Passenger" (2014) (Rebus; published in the UK and US editions of The Beat Goes On: The Complete Rebus Stories)
- "A Three-Pint Problem" (2014) (Rebus; published in the UK and US editions of The Beat Goes On: The Complete Rebus Stories)
- "Cinders" (2015) (Rebus; published in the US edition of The Beat Goes On: The Complete Rebus Stories)
- "The Travelling Companion" (2015) (novella, published by the Mysterious Bookshop, NYC; signed, lettered limited cloth edition of 26 copies and 100 numbered copies; softcover edition of 1,000 copies; published in the UK in 2016 by Head of Zeus Ltd, London)
- "Meet & Greet" (2015) (published in The Strand XLVI)
- "The Kill Fee" (2015) (published in The New Statesman 18 December 2015—8 January 2016)
- "Cafferty's Day" (2016) (Rebus; published with Rather be the Devil)
- "Charades" (2017) (Rebus; published in Country Life December 13/20)
- "The Rise" (2023) (published by Amazon Original Stories)

Other

- "Oxford Bar" (2007) (Essay published in the anthology How I Write: The Secret Lives of Authors)
- "John Rebus" (2007) (Mysterious Profile #8, a chapbook published by The Mysterious Bookshop in NYC in a signed limited hardcover edition of 100 copies and 1,000 softcover copies; reprinted in the UK edition of The Beat Goes On: The Complete Rebus Stories as "Rankin on Rebus")
- Ian Rankin interviews Arthur Conan Doyle (2013), published in Dead Interviews
- William McIlvanney's final novel, The Dark Remains, based on a manuscript McIlvanney left when he died in 2015, was completed by Ian Rankin and released in September 2021.

== Criticism ==
- Alegre, Sara Martin, "Aging in F(r)iendship: 'Big Ger' Cafferty and John Rebus," in Clues: A Journal of Detection 29.2 (2011): 73–82.
- Horsley, Lee, The Noir Thriller (Houndmills & New York: Palgrave, 2001).
- Lanchester, John, "Rebusworld", in London Review of Books 22.9 (27 April 2000), pp. 18–20.
- Lennard, John, "Ian Rankin", in Jay Parini, ed., British Writers Supplement X (New York & London: Charles Scribner's Sons, 2004), pp. 243–60
- MacDonald, Erin E., "Ghosts and Skeletons: Metaphors of Guilty History in Ian Rankin's Rebus Series", in Clues: A Journal of Detection 30.2 (2012): 67–75.
- MacDonald, Erin E., Ian Rankin: A Companion to the Mystery Fiction (Jefferson, NC: McFarland, 2020).
- Mandel, Ernest, Delightful Murder: A Social History of the Crime Story (Leichhardt, NSW, & London: Pluto Press, 1984).
- Marshall, Rodney, Blurred Boundaries: Rankin's Rebus (Amazon, 2012)
- Nicol, Christopher, "Ian Rankin's 'Black & Blue'", Scotnote No.24 (Glasgow: ASLS Publications, 2008)
- Ogle, Tina, "Crime on Screen", in The Observer (London), 16 April 2000, Screen p. 8.
- Plain, Gill, Ian Rankin’s Black and Blue (London & New York: Continuum, 2002)
- Plain, Gillian, "Ian Rankin: A Bibliography", in Crime Time 28 (2002), pp. 16–20.
- Robinson, David, "Mystery Man: In Search of the real Ian Rankin", in The Scotsman 10 March 2001, S2Weekend, pp. 1–4.
- Rowland, Susan, "Gothic Crimes: A Literature of Terror and Horror", in From Agatha Christie to Ruth Rendell (Houndmills & New York: Palgrave, 2001), pp. 110–34.
