= Jessica Brown Findlay =

English actress (born 1987)

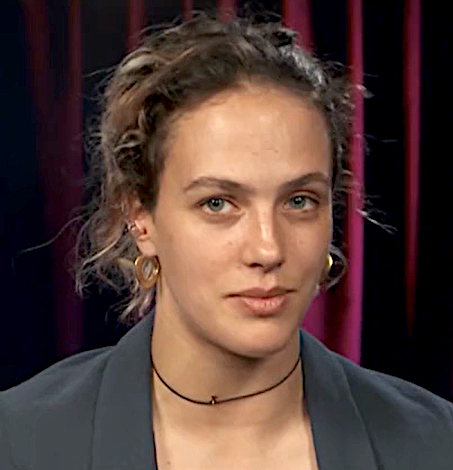
- Brown Findlay in 2017
- Born: Jessica Rose Brown-Findlay; 14 September 1987 (age 39)
- Education: Central Saint Martin's College of Art and Design
- Occupation: Actress
- Years active: 2009–present
- Spouse: Ziggy Heath (m. 2020)
- Children: 2

Jessica Rose Brown-Findlay (born 14 September 1987), known professionally as Jessica Brown Findlay, is an English actress. She played Lady Sybil Crawley (2010–2012) in the ITV television period drama series Downton Abbey and Emelia Conan Doyle in the 2011 British comedy-drama feature film Albatross.

In 2014, she appeared as Beverly Penn in the film adaptation of the Mark Helprin novel Winter's Tale. In 2015, she co-starred in Paul McGuigan's Victor Frankenstein as Lorelei, the Esmeralda-like acrobat. In 2016, she joined the cast of the biopic feature film England Is Mine, about the early life and career of English singer Morrissey, who co-founded the indie rock band The Smiths. Brown Findlay portrayed Charlotte Wells, a brothel madam's daughter, and a sex worker, in the three-series run of Harlots (2017–2019), a period drama television series initially screening on ITV Encore in the UK and on Hulu Plus in the US. In 2020, she was in the main cast of the series Brave New World. In 2026, Brown Findlay played Charlotte Keene, an F-35 pilot in the Apple TV show Silo (2026–present).

== Early life and education ==
Brown Findlay grew up in Cookham, Berkshire. Her father is a financial adviser and her mother is a teaching assistant. She told Vanity Fair in 2012, "I grew up there, as did my Mum. My Nan and Granddad are around the corner. It is a very familiar place and incredibly dear to my heart. It's sort of quiet, but wonderfully so."

She trained with the National Youth Ballet and the Associates of the Royal Ballet, and at age 15 was invited to dance with the Mariinsky Ballet at the Royal Opera House for a summer season. She attended Furze Platt Senior School in Maidenhead. At the end of her GCSEs, she was accepted to a number of ballet schools, but chose to attend the Arts Educational School in London. In her second year there, she had three operations on her ankles, the last of which went wrong, preventing her from continuing as a dancer. After encouragement from an art teacher, she finished her education at Arts Educational School, Tring Park, then moved on to a fine-art course at Central Saint Martin's College of Art and Design. In a 2012 interview with Vanity Fair, she said, "Growing up, I was completely in love and infatuated with ballet. Ballet was my life completely." She attended university in London, where she discovered the stage. She said, "Acting was the element from ballet that I actually loved and missed the most."

== Career ==
Brown Findlay was cast in the lead role of 17-year-old Emilia Conan Doyle for Albatross, a 2011 British coming-of-age comedy drama film directed by Niall MacCormick, co-starring Julia Ormond, Felicity Jones and Sebastian Koch. The film's premise is of a teenaged aspiring writer entering the lives of a dysfunctional family on the south coast of England, with bookish young women meeting up with a peer who lacks any boundaries or inhibitions. She was next cast in two episodes of the British science fiction comedy-drama television show Misfits, where she appeared in the first-season finale as a wholesome religious girl whose superpower is convincing everyone to abandon their delinquent behaviour in favour of celibacy.

Almost immediately after her work in Albatross, Brown Findlay was cast in the ITV period drama television series Downton Abbey as Lady Sybil Crawley, the youngest and most forward-thinking of the Grantham daughters. In a 2012 interview with Vanity Fair, she said, "I thought this character of Sybil was fascinating, and I liked her modern attitude to life." She was the first major cast member to leave the series when her character died from eclampsia after giving birth in the third series. During a 2015 interview, Downton Abbey creator Julian Fellowes discussed the plot twist: "Jessica [Brown Findlay, who played Sybil,] had said she was going to leave right from the beginning. She said, 'I'm doing three years, then I'm leaving.' So that was all worked out."

She next appeared as Abi in the Black Mirror episode "Fifteen Million Merits" with English actor Daniel Kaluuya. The episode imagined a dystopian future where people earn merits on exercise bikes and the only way to escape their slave-like existence is to audition for reality TV judges. She performed Anyone Who Knows What Love Is, a song that subsequently became the series' signature track.

In 2012, Brown Findlay became the face of the Dominic Jones jewellery line. She was cast in Not Another Happy Ending by John McKay, and in the miniseries Labyrinth, based on the novel of the same name by Kate Mosse, portraying Alaïs Pelletier. In 2012 she was cast as Beverly Penn in the film adaptation of the novel Winter's Tale (2014) with Colin Farrell and Russell Crowe. In July 2015, she played emotionally conflicted stepmother Alice Aldridge in The Outcast, the BBC's two-part television adaptation of Sadie Jones' novel. In May 2015, Brown Findlay made her professional theatre debut at the Almeida Theatre, London, as Electra in a new adaptation of the Oresteia, to positive reviews. The production subsequently moved to the Trafalgar Theatre in London's West End. Writer/director Robert Icke cast Brown Findlay in his production of Uncle Vanya at the same venue in February the following year.

In September 2016, it was announced that Brown Findlay would play Ophelia in a new production of Hamlet at the Almeida Theatre in London. The production was critically acclaimed and also later moved to the West End, where it ran until September 2017 with award-winning Sherlock and Fleabag actor Andrew Scott as Hamlet. In 2016 Brown Findlay joined the cast of a biopic feature film initially entitled Steven, about the early life and career of English singer Morrissey, who co-founded the indie rock band The Smiths. The film, renamed England Is Mine, premiered at the Edinburgh Film Festival in 2017, with Dunkirk actor Jack Lowden in the lead role. Brown Findlay starred as Bella Brown in This Beautiful Fantastic, a 2016 British romantic drama film directed and written by Simon Aboud, as a repressed foundling who forms a new life through her relationships with a curmudgeonly neighbour (Tom Wilkinson), a gifted cook (Andrew Scott) and an eccentric inventor (Jeremy Irvine).

In 2017 Brown Findlay portrayed Charlotte Wells, a brothel owner's daughter and famed courtesan, in Harlots, a period drama television series created by Alison Newman and Moira Buffini, and inspired by The Covent Garden Ladies by Hallie Rubenhold. It premiered on 27 March 2017 on ITV Encore in the UK and on 29 March 2017 on Hulu Plus in the US. It focuses on Margaret Wells, who runs a brothel in 18th century England and struggles to raise her daughters in a chaotic household. Also in 2017, Brown Findlay voiced the character of Fay in the animated film Monster Family.

In 2018, she starred as Elizabeth McKenna in The Guernsey Literary and Potato Peel Pie Society. In May 2019, it was announced that she would star as Lenina Crowne in the NBCUniversal series Brave New World, based on the classic 1932 novel by Aldous Huxley. It was subsequently moved to the Peacock network.

In 2021 she starred as Pamela Legat in the Netflix film Munich – The Edge of War, describing events in Britain and Germany prior to the start of World War II. In 2026 she played Charlotte Keene, an American fighter pilot and sister of a US Congressman in the Apple TV show Silo (based on the science fiction book series by Hugh Howey) that finds herself central to the use of memory suppressing drugs in the storyline.

== Personal life ==
Brown Findlay was reportedly the victim of a hacker in 2014 who stole intimate pictures and videos. She began dating actor Ziggy Heath in late 2016. They married on 12 September 2020. On 5 November 2022, their twin sons were born.

== Acting credits ==
Key
†	Denotes projects that have not yet been released

=== Film ===
Year	Title	Role	Notes	Ref.
2011	Albatross	Emelia Conan Doyle		
2014	Winter's Tale	Beverly Penn		
2014	Lullaby	Karen Lowenstein		
2014	The Riot Club	Rachel		
2015	Victor Frankenstein	Lorelei		
2016	This Beautiful Fantastic	Bella Brown		
2017	England Is Mine	Linder Sterling		
2017	Monster Family	Fay Wishbone	Voice role	
2018	Hamlet	Ophelia	Television film	
2018	The Guernsey Literary and Potato Peel Pie Society	Elizabeth McKenna		
2020	The Banishing	Marianne Forster		
2021	Munich: The Edge of War	Pamela Legat		
2021	Monster Family 2	Fay Wishbone	Voice role	
2022	Iris Warriors	Miss Shaw		
2022	The Hanging Sun	Lea		
2025	Downton Abbey: The Grand Finale	Lady Sybil Branson (née Crawley)	Archival footage only	
2026	Mother Mary	Tessa		
TBA	An Unsuitable Game †	Mabel	Pre-production	

=== Television ===
Year	Title	Role	Notes	Ref.
2009, 2011	Misfits	Rachel Leyton	Recurring role; 2 episodes	
2010–2012	Downton Abbey	Lady Sybil Branson (née Crawley)	Series regular; 21 episodes	
2011	Black Mirror	Abi Khan	Episode: "Fifteen Million Merits"	
2012	Labyrinth	Alaïs Pelletier du Mas	Miniseries; 2 episodes	
2014	Jamaica Inn	Mary Yellan	Miniseries; 3 episodes	
2015	The Outcast	Alice Aldridge	Miniseries; 2 episodes	
2017–2019	Harlots	Charlotte Wells	Series regular; 20 episodes	
2020	Brave New World	Lenina Crowne	Miniseries; 9 episodes	
2020–2021	Castlevania	Lenore	Series regular; 20 episodes	
2022	Life After Life	Izzie	Miniseries; 3 episodes	
2022	The Flatshare	Tiffany Moore	Miniseries; 6 episodes	
2023–2025	Isadora Moon	Cordelia Moon	Series regular; 23 episodes	
2025	Playing Nice	Lucy Lambert	Miniseries; 4 episodes	
2026–present	Silo	Charlotte "Charles" Keene	Series regular; 5 episodes	
TBA	Untitled Peaky Blinders Sequel †	TBA	Filming	

=== Theatre ===
Year	Title	Role	Venue
2015	Oresteia	Electra	Almeida Theatre
2015	Oresteia	Electra	Trafalgar Studios
2016	Uncle Vanya	Sonya	Almeida Theatre
2017	Hamlet	Ophelia	Almeida Theatre
2017	Hamlet	Ophelia	Harold Pinter Theatre
2024	An Enemy of the People	Katharina Stockmann	Duke of York's Theatre

== Awards and nominations ==
Year	Award	Category	Work	Result	Ref.
2011	British Independent Film Awards	Most Promising Newcomer	Albatross	Nominated	
2012	Evening Standard British Film Awards	Most Promising Newcomer	Albatross	Nominated	
2015	Ian Charleson Awards	Special Commendation	Oresteia	Nominated	
2016	Ian Charleson Awards	Second Prize	Uncle Vanya	Won	
