= The Winter Ghosts =

Novel by Kate Mosse

- First edition
- Author: Kate Mosse
- Illustrator: Brian Gallagher
- Language: English
- Publisher: Orion
- Publication date: Oct 2009
- Publication place: United Kingdom
- Media type: Print
- Pages: 272
- ISBN: 1-4091-1227-6

The Winter Ghosts is a 2009 historical fiction novel by English author Kate Mosse based on The Cave, a novella she wrote earlier that year as part of the Quick Reads initiative.

== Plot introduction ==
In 1933 Toulouse, Freddie Watson takes a letter written in medieval Occitan to an antiquarian bookseller for translation. Questioned by the proprietor Freddie tells how, five years earlier in 1928 at the age of 27 he had travelled by car to Ariège ostensibly to help recover from a bout of influenza, but also to try and shake off the grief of his brother George's death as a member of the Royal Sussex Regiment in the Battle of the Boar's Head.

On a cold winter morning he drives south from Tarascon-sur-Ariège towards Vicdessos but he gets lost, and then caught in a blizzard drives off the road. He is uninjured but the car is damaged and he sets off on foot through the woods and eventually reaches a village where he finds a boarding house. He is told that that night is the annual feast and he is invited to attend, where he meets the captivating Fabrissa and spend the night 'talking of love and loss and war', both his own and also those of the village itself which some 700 years earlier had its Cathar faith destroyed by the Catholic church.

But next morning Fabrissa is gone...

== Inspirations/Themes ==
In an afterword to the 2010 Orion paperback edition the author explains that 'four specific inspirations or themes underpin the narrative pace and characterization:

- The beauty and hidden mystery of the landscape of the Southwest of France which provides the setting for the story.
- The nature of war, past and present, the author passes a monument every day to the men of Sussex who died in the First World War, in some villages none of the men who enlisted with the Royal Sussex Regiment survived. Such monuments are also present throughout France - "war even when long over, leaves a shadow, a scar on the landscape. This to, I wished to work in to the novel"
- The persecution of the Cathars, first explored in Labyrinth, specifically "the entombment and mass execution of the last Cathars in Languedoc in 1328.
- Male grief and male suffering, the demonstration of which was suppressed after the First World War. The consequences of this on an entire generation haunted the author, "I wanted, therefore, to write a gentle and good but vulnerable man, unable to cope with modern life".

In conclusion the author describes how she has written both a love-story and a ghost story.

== Reception ==
- Natalie Young in The Times compared it with Mosse's earlier novels Layrinth and Sepulchre set in the same area: "The Winter Ghosts is a more temperate book than the historical blockbusters preceding it. Its spirit is more contemporary; inquiry rests on the plight of a solitary man trying to make sense of his grief, and Mosse’s descriptive writing has been scaled back so that what remains on the surface is light and clear...Mosse has made much of her identification with the Cathars, who were brutally hunted down for heresy. Despite her motivation to expose persecution and examine the weight of loss on a generation, the convolutions of historical conflict are kept beneath the surface of a novel about a man and his grief that is readable, affecting and nicely done."
- Helen Brown in The Telegraph is impressed, "As Mosse presses the slices of her story together – one medieval and the other 20th century – her readers can enjoy the familiar skin-deep frisson of being spooked, while deeper emotions are being subtly stirred beneath. She plays a very simple, formulaic trick to bring the lives and remotely terrible deaths of ancient Pyrenean people very close to 21st-century English folk. And one is left feeling genuinely haunted – as though one of Mosse’s 13th-century peasants might at any moment pass through your house and casually remind you you’ve left the lid off the pickle."
- Emma Lee-Potter in the Daily Express is also very positive, "Mosse excels at transporting her readers into another time and another world. You can almost hear the guns and screams of George’s final hours and feel Freddie’s painful realisation at his 21st birthday lunch at Fortnum & Mason that with his brother gone he and his parents are “strangers with nothing to say”. While Freddie’s “cracked heart” and struggle to make sense of his loss are by far the most touching parts of the book, Mosse’s depiction of life in southern France between the wars is utterly convincing. Not only that, the book itself is a work of art – with stunning illustrations by artist Brian Gallagher and copies of vintage French maps as endpapers."
- Emma Hagestadt has reservations: "The Winter Ghosts, which began life as a novella for the Quick Reads campaign to encourage adult literacy, sees Mosse engaged in a more succinct mode of storytelling. This works particularly well in the opening chapters, when the taut narrative suggests unspecified depths. It's only when Mosse's interest in spirits, rather than spirituality, takes the upper hand that the link between the fallen of the Somme and long-ago heretics starts to feel a little far-fetched.
