= Rennes-les-Bains =

Commune in Occitanie, France

- Commune
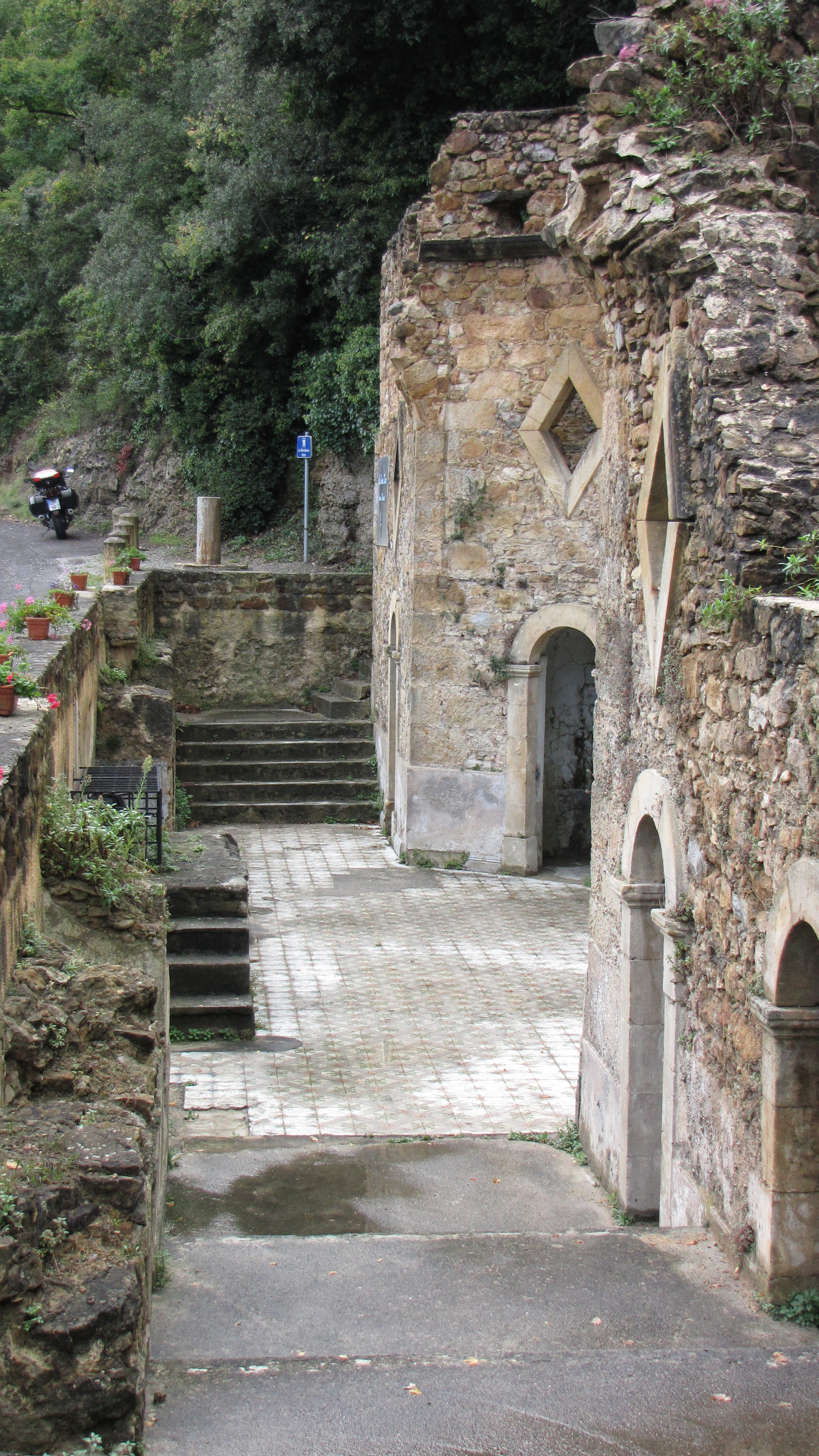
- The baths

- Coat of arms
- Location of Rennes-les-Bains
- Location within France Location within Occitanie
- Coordinates: 42°55′11″N 2°19′11″E
- Country: France
- Region: Occitania
- Department: Aude
- Arrondissement: Limoux
- Canton: La Haute-Vallée de l'Aude

Government
  - Mayor (2023–2026): Olivier Buscail
- Area^{1}: 18.77 km^{2} (7.25 sq mi)
- Elevation: 310 m (1,020 ft)
- Highest elevation: 822 m (2,697 ft)
- Lowest elevation: 254 m (833 ft)
- Population (2023): 238
  - Density: 12.7/km^{2} (32.8/sq mi)
- Time zone: UTC+01:00 (CET)
  - Summer (DST): UTC+02:00 (CEST)
- INSEE/Postal code: 11310 /11190
- ^{1} French Land Register data, which excludes lakes, ponds, glaciers > 1 km^{2} (0.386 sq mi or 247 acres) and river estuaries.

Rennes-les-Bains (French pronunciation: [ʁɛn le bɛ̃]; Occitan: Los Banhs de Rènnas) is a commune in the Aude department in southern France.

Bathers have enjoyed the natural hot spring waters for thousands of years - they are still used today as a cure for rheumatism and certain skin problems. Today, it is a modern thermal spa with the latest equipment. Due to a microbe found in the piping of the old baths they have been closed and a new hospital built which gets its water from another source. Due to its enormous popularity the 'Bains Forts', an old 'lavoir' where young people have bathed for the last 40 years, have been cemented in and closed indefinitely. This event has led some to rename Rennes-les-Bains, Rennes-sans-Bains.

== Geography ==
Rennes-les-Bains is located in the valley of the River Sals, 48 km (30 mi) from Carcassonne, 20 km (12 mi) from Limoux, and 3 km (1.9 mi) from Rennes-le-Château.

== History ==
The origins of Rennes-les-Bains go back to Antiquity. Archaeological artifacts indicate that the spa was at one time popular with the Roman colony in Colonia Narbo Martius (Narbonne).

Traditionally the serving doctor of the village is also the historian.

== Population ==
Historical population
Year	Pop.	±% p.a.
1968	192	—
1975	192	+0.00%
1982	194	+0.15%
1990	221	+1.64%
1999	159	−3.59%
2007	172	+0.99%
2012	258	+8.45%
2017	205	−4.49%
2023	238	+2.52%
Source: INSEE

== Miscellaneous ==
Rennes-les-Bains is known for another reason, however: it is mentioned numerous times in many books about Rennes-le-Chateau, famous now also because of Dan Brown's novel The Da Vinci Code. Subsequently, the author Kate Mosse set the larger part of her 2007 novel Sepulchre in the immediate vicinity.

Abbé Henri Boudet was the parish priest of Rennes-les-Bains at the same time that Bérenger Saunière was the incumbent of Rennes-le-Château. Boudet's strange book, La vraie langue celtique et le cromleck de Rennes-les-Bains (1886) argued that all languages were derived from the English tongue whereby the Abbé tried to establish his theory through the use of puns.

In 1832 a book by Auguste de Labouïsse-Rochefort entitled Voyages à Rennes-les-Bains first referred to a treasure located at Mont Blanchefort, whereby a story was told about a wizard who nearly succeeded in taking the purse-strings of the Devil, but failed because the local villagers did not help him at the crucial moment - Auguste de Labouïsse-Rochefort had married a daughter of a millionaire that had lost his fortune.

In Les Amours, A Éléonore, recueil D’élégies divisé en Trois Livres (1817), Auguste de Labouïsse-Rochefort had the motto "Et in Arcadia ego" placed on its title page; this was a reference to the Academy of Arcadia that was formed in Italy in 1690 - Labouïsse-Rochefort later became a member of the Academy in 1832.

Since July 1985 the village has been twinned with the city of Rennes in Brittany.

== See also ==
- Corbières Massif
- Communes of the Aude department
- Shadowland (film)

== Bibliography ==
- CATEL, Guillaume, Memoires sur l'Histoire du Languedoc, 1633
- DELMAS, Abbé : Antiquités des bains de Montferrand communément appelés les bains de Rennes, 1709. (Manuscript)
- JULIA (J.S.E.) : Dissertation sur les eaux thermales connues sous le nom des Bains de Rennes, 1814. (Reprinted 1984, Schrauben) - (Mentions Delmas)
- LIGNON, Dr : Journal des Bains de Montferrand, 1819.
- LABOUISSE-ROCHEFORT : Voyage à Rennes-les-Bains, Paris, 1832.
- CAZAINTRE, Dr : Analyse des eaux thermo-minérale de Rennes (Aude), 1853.
- CAZAINTRE, Dr : Observations médicales relatives à l'emploi de l'eau salée de la rivière de Salz à Rennes-les-Bains (Aude), 1858.
- CAZAINTRE, Dr : Notice sur les eaux thermo-minérales de Rennes-les-Bains, 1862
- GOURDON, Dr Jean : Stations thermales de l'Aude - Rennes-les-Bains. Cote BN:8°TE163/155, 1874.
- BOUDET, Henri : La Vrai Langue Celtique et le Cromleck de Rennes-les-Bains, 1886. (Reprinted 1984 by Belisane)
- VAYSSE, Dr L. : Eaux Thermo-minérales de Rennes-les-Bains, 1886.
- COURRENT, Dr Paul : Etude générale sur Rennes-les-Bains, 1928.
- COURRENT, Dr Paul : Rennes-les-Bains (Aude) – Ses Sources et Leurs Indications, 1932. Editions du "Languedoc Medical".
- COURRENT Dr Paul : Notice historique sur les bains de Rennes connus anciennement des Bains de Montferrand - Leur origine gallo-romaine et leur évolution jusqu'à la fin du XVIIIe siècle. Carcassonne, 1934.
- COURRENT, Dr Paul : Station hydrominérale de Rennes-les-Bains - Thermes romains (ancien Bain Fort), 1934.
- COURRENT, Dr Paul : Rennes-les-Bains (Aude) : Monographie historique, scientifique, médico-thermale et touristique, 1942.
- COURRENT, Dr Paul : Découverte d'une mosaïque à Rennes-les-Bains. Bulletin de la société d'études scientifiques de l'Aude. Tome XLIX, 1948.
- COURRENT, Dr Paul : Un morceau de mosaïque provenant de Rennes-les-Bains. Bulletin de la société d'études scientifiques de l'Aude. Tome XLIX, 1948.
- GIBERT, Urbain et RANCOULE : Rennes-les-Bains : Notes sur une tête sculptée. Bulletin de la société d'études scientifiques de l'Aude. Tome LXIX, 1969.
- GIBERT, Urbain : Notes Historiques sur les Bains de Montferrand devenus les Bains de Rennes, actuellement Rennes-les-Bains. Bulletin de la société d'études scientifiques de l'Aude. Tome LXXIII, 1973.
- MONTS (Abbé Bruno de) : Rennes-le-Château et Rennes-les-Bains. 32 pages, 1984.
- ALESSANDRI, Patrice : Rennes-les-Bains (Aude) - vestiges antiques du site thermal au Parc de la Reine. Etudes Roussillonnaies, Tome XVII, 1999.
- WOOD, David : Genesis The First Book of Revelations ISBN 0-85936-180-2 Baton Press Ltd 1985.
