= Electrathon =

Electric vehicle endurance racing competition

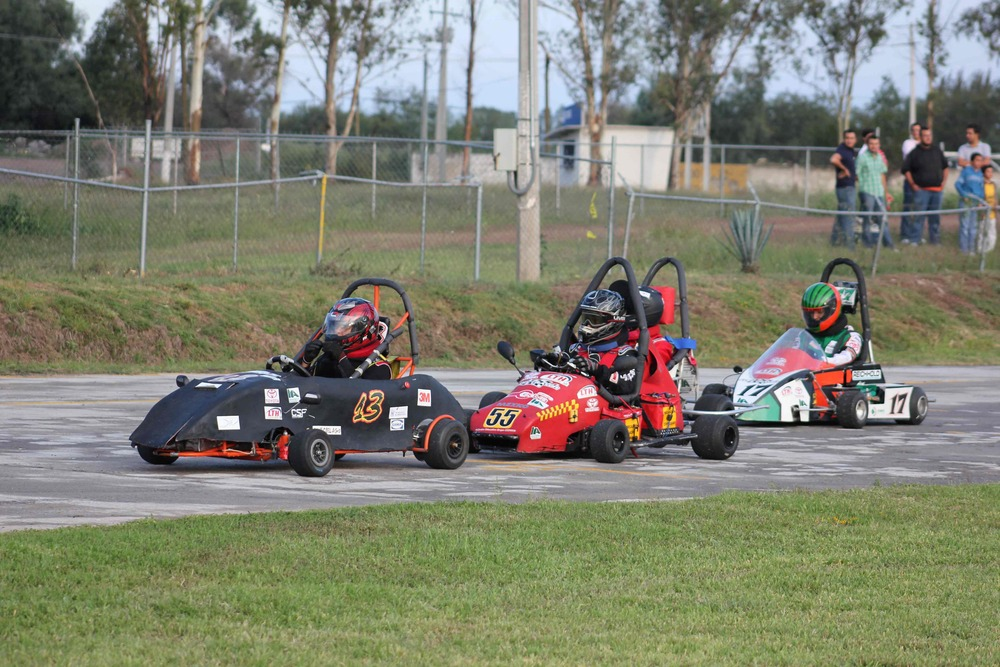
Electrathons in action

Electrathon is an electric vehicle endurance racing competition. The winner is determined by who traveled the farthest in two 1-hour races on 1kwh of battery power in each race. The cars are generally 3 wheeled, hand built vehicles although some kit-built cars have been available in the past. Cars are similar in size to a go-kart and frequently have an aerodynamic body. Unlike a go-kart, they are powered by electric motors and rechargeable batteries, industrially produced. The battery is limited to 1kwh of capacity. This equates to approximately 73lbs of lead-acid battery. Other battery chemistries are allowed but the weights are restricted accordingly to maintain the 1kwh capacity limit. This type of lightweight car appeared in Australia in the late 1970s and was warmly embraced and introduced into American culture as early as 1980.

The current official record is 62.05 miles (99.86 km) as of February 2011.

Electrathon class vehicles are principally defined and constrained by length and width (12 feet long and 4 feet wide or 3.6 m × 1.2 m maximum) and by battery weight and chemistry (73 pounds or 33 kilograms, sealed lead acid). Discharged for one hour, this amounts to just under one kilowatt (1.3 hp). Driver's weight is ballasted to 180 lb (82 kg) for fairness. Safety regulations require features such as braking systems, roll bars, and electrical disconnects.

The cost to build an electrathon racer varies but has been shown to be as little as US$1300 for a complete car with batteries.

== Electrathon racing ==
Electrathon racing started in England, spread to Australia, and arrived in the United States in 1990. The basic format is to determine which car can travel the furthest in one hour within the limitations of battery weight and other factors mentioned above. Design teams must compromise speed in order to gain distance. Success requires efficiency of both the machine and driving technique.

The relatively low cost of the electrathon racing has made the sport a popular activity for high school age students worldwide who learn skills related to design, problem-solving, teamwork, mathematics, physics, and electricity. Prizes are awarded for high school, college and open divisions, and there are separate classes for solar and advanced battery vehicles, but all generally race together under the same rules.

Races are held on parking lots, road courses, and oval speedways, but size is a major factor, as cornering friction decreases efficiency. At present, the world record for distance travelled in one hour is 62.05 miles (99.86 km), set in July 2009 on the 5-mile (8.0 km) oval at the Ford Michigan Proving Ground, by C. Michael Lewis. Using the USDOE conversion factors, this would be the equivalent of 2,370 miles per US gallon (1,010 km/L). A significant number of electrathons in the USA are built with body-parts from Blue Sky Design LLC, which sells aerodynamic body-parts specialized for electrathons.

== Land speed record ==
In 2007, the Utah Salt Flats Racing Association invited several Electrathon Competitors after adding an Electrathon class. It used the same vehicle design rules, but instead of a 60-minute endurance event, it's a straight line top speed event on a one-mile course. Speed was/is measured using a 30-foot trap at the end of the 1 mile distance. The first record was set by Kirk Swaney, driving a carbon fiber streamliner designed & built by SHIFT Electric Vehicles LLC (1.6 km). The current record is 110.258 mph (177.443 km/h) set by Shannon Cloud in 2008, driving a streamliner designed & built by Dave Cloud.

== Changes ==
Before the 2010 season, the Electrathon America battery weight limit was 67 pounds (30 kg).

== See also ==
- Battery electric vehicle
- Electric vehicle battery
- Greenpower
