= Albatross (2011 film) =

- Film poster
- Directed by: Niall MacCormick
- Screenplay by: Tamzin Rafn
- Produced by: Adrian Sturges; Steve Christian; Marc Samuelson
- Starring: Jessica Brown Findlay; Sebastian Koch; Julia Ormond; Felicity Jones
- Cinematography: Jan Jonaeus
- Edited by: Mark Eckersley
- Music by: Jack C. Arnold
- Production companies: CinemaNX; Isle of Man Film
- Distributed by: CinemaNX; WestEnd Films; IFC Films
- Release dates: 21 June 2011 (EIFF); 14 October 2011 (United Kingdom)
- Running time: 88 minutes
- Country: United Kingdom
- Language: English

Albatross is a 2011 British coming-of-age drama film directed by Niall MacCormick, written by Tamzin Rafn and starring Sebastian Koch, Julia Ormond, Felicity Jones and Jessica Brown Findlay. The film revolves around the premise of an aspiring teenage writer entering the lives of a dysfunctional family living on the south coast of England. "Albatross" is a metaphor used to describe a constant and inescapable burden.

The film was shot entirely on the Isle of Man with the support of the island's government. It is MacCormick's feature film debut, he having previously made his name in television. Also making her debut was screenwriter Tamzin Rafn. Rafn based the script on her own experiences as a rebellious teenager.

Albatross premiered at the Edinburgh International Film Festival in June 2011. It was released in the United Kingdom on 14 October 2011 garnering mixed reviews, although Brown Findlay has received praise for her performance.

== Plot ==
The rebellious teenage dropout, Emelia Conan Doyle, believes herself to be a descendant of Arthur Conan Doyle. She takes on a job as a cleaner in a seaside hotel owned by Jonathan Fischer. Jonathan is a writer from Germany who has struggled with writer's block since his successful first novel, The Cliff House, was published 21 years before. He lives in the hotel with his wife Joa and two daughters, Beth, 17, and Posy, 6. Jonathan is constantly sequestered in the attic working ineffectually on his writing, leaving the hotel to be run by Joa. Their marriage is stormy, as Joa is unhappy about Jonathan's lack of success in his profession and his disconnected parenting. Meanwhile, Emelia has lived with her grandparents since her mother committed suicide.

On her first day of work, Emelia catches Jonathan masturbating in the attic. She meets Beth, who is applying to study medicine at the University of Oxford. Beth invites Emilia to dinner with the family, during which Emelia reveals that she is writing a novel but is struggling to live up to the Conan Doyle name. Later, Jonathan offers Emilia creative writing lessons. They conduct their lessons secretly in the attic. One day, Jonathan drives Emelia to the grave of Arthur Conan Doyle. The two eventually begin a sexual relationship. Meanwhile, Emelia teaches Beth to explore her rebellious side and the two become best friends.

Emelia accompanies Beth to Oxford for her entrance interview. On the first night they go out for a drink and end up partying with other students. Beth has casual sex with one of the men. They return to her accommodation the next morning to find out that the interview has been moved up to that day. Beth exits the interview feeling nervous, but receives encouragement from Emelia.

After returning from Oxford, Emelia begins feeling guilty about her affair with Jonathan and starts distancing herself from him. She also deals with the death of her grandmother. Days after the funeral, Beth falls ill, which Emelia suspects to be morning sickness. Emelia gets her a pregnancy test kit. As she drops off the test kit in Beth's room, Jonathan calls her to the attic. Emelia tells Jonathan she has given up trying to write a novel and admonishes him for not living a single day since writing The Cliff House. Meanwhile, Joa catches Beth with the completed pregnancy test, which indicates she is not pregnant. Emelia returns to Beth's room while Joa angrily informs Jonathan about Beth's sexual activity, and chastises his parenting again. A disheartened Jonathan admits his affair with Emelia. Enraged, Joa yells "... you have been fucking our daughter's best friend?", which is overheard by Beth. Joa kicks Jonathan out of the house.

The following day at school, Emelia tries to reconcile with Beth, but Beth rejects her overtures, and tells her she is not a Conan Doyle. That night, Emelia questions her grandfather about this, and he reveals that her mother lied to her about being a descendant of Arthur Conan Doyle. However, he encourages her to pursue her dream of writing, explaining that the Conan Doyle name was an albatross around her neck which has now been lifted.

Jonathan gives Emelia his laptop and encourages her to continue writing. She begins writing her novel using the laptop. One day, while having her work printed at a copy shop, she sees Beth (who is being driven to Oxford by Jonathan) wearing Emelia's "I Put Out" top. Emelia smiles and waves, but Beth only looks back coldly and quickly gets back into the car. In the car, Beth looks at her shirt and smiles. Emelia rides off on her bicycle with the printed draft of her novel titled "Albatross".

== Cast ==
The cast includes:

- Jessica Brown Findlay as Emelia
- Sebastian Koch as Jonathan Fischer
- Julia Ormond as Joa Fischer
- Felicity Jones as Beth Fischer
- Peter Vaughan as Grandpa

== Production ==
Albatross is BAFTA-nominated director Niall MacCormick's debut feature film and the first screenplay by Tamzin Rafn. According to Rafn, the script was optioned by producer Marc Samuelson and CinemaNX about three weeks after her agent sent it out. It was then sent out to directors, some of whom Rafn met. She said MacCormick was one of her favourites and was "really glad" when the script was offered to him.

=== Writing ===
Tamzin Rafn wrote the screenplay of Albatross on weekends over the course of three months while working full-time during the weekdays.

The film's recurring theme, one's desire to escape from something holding one back, is derived from Rafn's personal experiences. Rafn grew up in the town of Worthing on the south coast of England and spent her teenage years wanting to leave. According to her, "pushing the boundaries came as a result of that being an actuality in my teens. It just so turns out that being a nightmare comes naturally to me. And writing Emilia was like writing a version of myself but adding characteristics to make it filmic and that meant giving her some tragedy and heart to explain her behaviour."

Rafn credited Diablo Cody as inspiration for her to write about her own experiences. Cody began her foray into writing by penning a memoir about her career as a stripper. She later won an Academy Award for Best Original Screenplay for the film Juno. Rafn said, "What I did know about though was naughty girls in seaside towns. I knew that because I’d been one and I always loved movies about people who misbehaved... So I sat down and I thought about everything I loved in movies. That list ran to: naughty girls, seaside towns, writers and scandalous behaviour. I then watched every movie that fitted that for me – The Wonder Boys, The Squid and the Whale, Wish You Were Here, The Door in the Floor, Thirteen."

=== Casting ===
Casting director Shaheen Baig reportedly resisted pressure to include major stars.

The film marked Jessica Brown Findlay's first starring role in a major production. She was reportedly cast before she began filming in the successful television series Downton Abbey. While auditioning for Alice in Wonderland, Brown Findlay found an agent who led her to the script of Albatross. MacCormick wanted "a girl who could tell someone to f*** off and die and for the audience to still feel they were actually quite charming" for the film's central role, Emelia. Brown Findlay said she adored the role and "decided to be Emelia both inside and outside the audition room." MacCormick was shocked to find out that she was actually nothing like the character when the cast began filming in 2009. Brown Findlay said Emelia and Lady Sybil, her role in Downton Abbey, are "both going to grow into strong women. They're finding out who they are and what they're going to be." She admitted the characters are "very different," and that Emelia has "got that same guts that Sybil has - just in a much more overtly obvious way, she's ballsy. She doesn't have a filter system - if she thinks something, she says it. She doesn't have that restraint that Sybil has."

Brown Findlay is close friends with co-star Felicity Jones, whom she met at auditions. Jones was cast as the introverted Beth. "I should probably say I was very different to her aged 17. I would sound a lot cooler. But I like the way Beth is an observer," she said.

Sebastian Koch's part as Jonathan was only the second English-speaking role of the German actor's career, which spans more than two decades. Of Brown Findlay, Koch said "She started with this film, and did it wonderfully – just to see these first steps was wonderful for me, and perhaps to help and support her a bit. She’s really brilliant in the film; she’s Emelia, exactly what the script wanted."

=== Filming ===
Albatross was filmed entirely on the Isle of Man, which was used to portray the film's setting in a fictional small coastal town in southern England. Among the locations used in the film were historic house Ravencliffe near Douglas Head and Peel harbour. Other venues included: the quay by Castle Rushen in Castletown, the west coast at Niarbyl, the graveyard at St Marks, and the lighthouse at the Point of Ayre. The interview episode at an Oxford college was filmed in the quadrangle and refectory of King William's College.

The Isle of Man's Minister for Economic Development Allan Bell said the film showcases "the beauty and diversity of locations that the Island has to offer film-makers... One of the many considerations that come into play when we are considering involvement in a film project is how well the script fits the natural locations of the Island and in how many ways the Island can benefit from any possible collaboration. Albatross ticked all the boxes and we are thrilled to be associated with a film of such quality and appeal."

The film was shot in 2009 and took six weeks to complete.

== Promotion and release ==
Albatross premiered at the 2011 Edinburgh International Film Festival in June 2011. The trailer debuted on guardian.co.uk's film section on 2 August 2011. The film was released in the United Kingdom on 14 October 2011. In the United States, the film was distributed by IFC Films and released on 13 January 2012.

== Reception ==
=== Critical response ===
Albatross has received mixed critical reviews. As of October 2021, the film holds a 54% approval rating on aggregator Rotten Tomatoes, based on 26 reviews with an average rating of 5.3/10. The film also holds a score of 42 based on 10 reviews at Metacritic, indicating "mixed or average reviews".

It was well received by critics at the Edinburgh International Film Festival. Ross Miller said the film was "cute without being schmaltzy, sweet without being sickly, insightful without being preachy" and "destined to be one of the most talked about and beloved British films of the year." Variety's Charles Gant praised the performances of Brown Findlay, Koch and Ormond and described director MacCormick's debut effort as "amiable."

Upon release in the UK, the film received less enthusiastic reviews. The Guardian's Peter Bradshaw gave the film 2/5 stars; he praised Brown Findlay's star-power, but called the film's premise "sentimental and unreal." Philip French said, "Heavy-handed and unconvincing, it's Fawlty Towers without the jokes." The Independent's Anthony Quinn criticised the film's lack of believability, saying it "has a puppyish eagerness that doesn't quite deliver." It was given 3/5 stars by Empire, with a verdict: "A startling performance from Findlay doesn't quite make up for a disappointing third act."

In the United States, Jeanette Catsoulis of The New York Times said the film "offsets slack plotting with creative casting and sensitive performances." Adam Markowitz of Entertainment Weekly gave it a C−, saying: "Trite lessons are learned. Plotlines play out in familiar arcs. A few blips of sex and drug use aim to make the movie feel more grown-up. Instead, they make it off-limits to the only age group likely to find any charm in its smug Britcom cutesiness."

=== Awards ===
Albatross received two nominations at the 2011 British Independent Film Awards—Felicity Jones and Jessica Brown Findlay for Best Supporting Actress and Most Promising Newcomer respectively. Brown Findlay also received a Promising Newcomer nomination at the Evening Standard British Film Awards for 2011.

Award	Date of ceremony	Category	Recipients and nominees	Result
British Independent Film Awards	4 December 2011	Best Supporting Actress	Felicity Jones	Nominated
British Independent Film Awards	4 December 2011	Most Promising Newcomer	Jessica Brown Findlay	Nominated
Evening Standard British Film Awards	6 February 2012	Most Promising Newcomer	Jessica Brown Findlay	Nominated
