= Kate Mosse =

English writer (born 1961)

Kate Mosse CBE
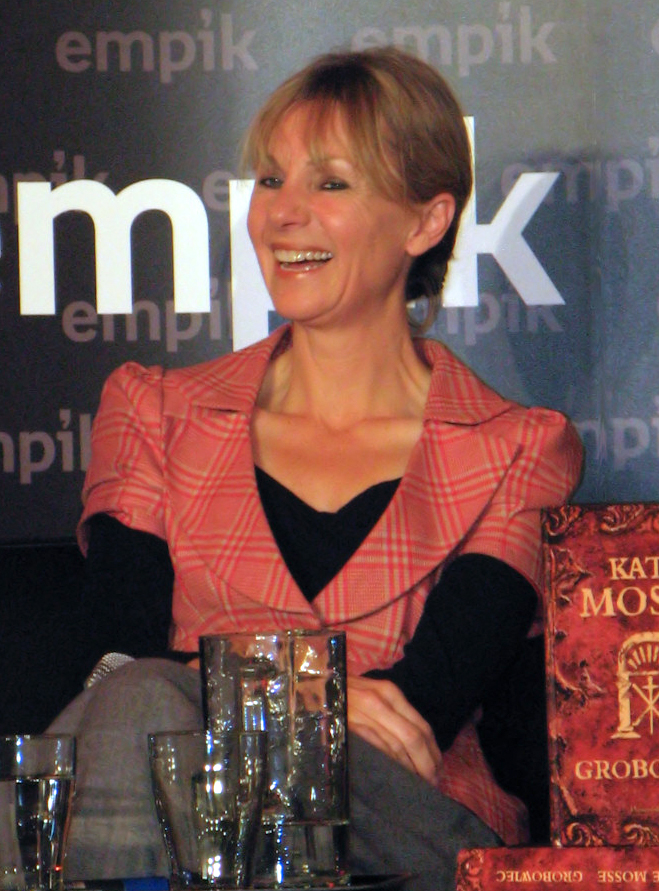
- Mosse in 2008
- Born: Katharine Mosse; 1961 (age 64–65); Chichester, West Sussex, England
- Education: University of Oxford (BA)
- Occupation: Writer
- Spouse: Greg Mosse
- Children: 2
- Writing career
- Genres: Historical fiction, non-fiction, supernatural, gothic
- Notable work: Labyrinth (2005)
- Website: katemosse.co.uk

Katherine Louise Mosse CBE (born 1961) is a British novelist, non-fiction and short story writer and broadcaster. She is best known for her 2005 novel Labyrinth, which has been translated into more than 37 languages. She co-founded in 1996 the annual award for best UK-published English-language novel by a woman that is now known as the Women's Prize for Fiction, and since 2024 has a sister award, The Women's Prize for Nonfiction.

== Early life and career ==
Mosse was born in Chichester, and raised in Fishbourne, West Sussex, the eldest of three sisters born to a solicitor, Richard (1920–2011) and Barbara (1931–). Mosse's aunt was involved in the campaign for the ordination of women and her grandfather was a vicar. She was educated at Chichester High School for Girls and New College, Oxford, from where she graduated in 1984 with a BA (Hons) in English. After leaving university, she spent seven years working in publishing in London for Hodder & Stoughton, then Century, and finally as an editorial director at Hutchinson, part of the Random House group. She was a member of the National Union of Journalists (NUJ) and Women in Publishing.

She left publishing in 1992, for a writing career beginning with the non-fiction, Becoming a Mother.

== Career ==
=== Early writing and the Languedoc Trilogy ===
Although best known for her adventure and ghost fiction, inspired by real history, Mosse's first two works were non-fiction. Becoming A Mother (in its seventh edition) was published by Virago in 1993, followed in 1995 by The House: Behind the Scenes at the Royal Opera House, Covent Garden, published by BBC Books to accompany the BBC2 series, The House. She then wrote two contemporary novels. Eskimo Kissing, about a young, adopted woman searching for her background, was well received when it was published in 1996. This was followed in 1998 by the biotech thriller, Crucifix Lane.

The first of the Languedoc Trilogy, Labyrinth, appeared in 2005. A number one bestseller internationally, it has sold millions of copies and was the bestselling title in the UK for 2006. It also won the Richard & Judy Best Book at the British Book Awards 2006 and was named as one of Waterstones Top 25 books of the past 25 years. A Labyrinth miniseries was broadcast in 2013.

In October 2007, the second novel in the trilogy, Sepulchre, was published. A tale of haunting and Tarot set in fin-de-siècle and 20th-century France, it was also a number one bestseller in the UK and an international bestseller. While Mosse was researching the third and final novel in the trilogy, she released her novel The Winter Ghosts in 2009, based on a novella she previously contributed to the Quick Reads Initiative. Film rights have been sold to Ruby Films. Citadel, the third novel in the trilogy, came out in 2012 and was also an international bestseller. Inspired by the real history of the resistance in Carcassonne during World War II, it tells the story of an imagined all-female resistance unit.

In October 2013, Mosse's collection of short stories, The Mistletoe Bride & Other Haunting Tales, was published – a collection of ghost stories inspired by traditional folk tales and country legends from England and France, throughout Sussex, Brittany and the Languedoc.

In September 2014, Mosse published her gothic thriller The Taxidermist's Daughter, set in 1912 in Fishbourne and Chichester.

In June 2019, Mosse released The Burning Chambers, the first of a series of novels, beginning in the French Wars of Religion, spanning 300 years from 1562 in Carcassonne, via Amsterdam to 1862 in Franschhoek, Western Cape, South Africa. The second in the series, The City of Tears, was published in 2020.

=== Other writing and plays ===
Mosse has also contributed a number of essays and stories to anthologies and collections, including Modern Delight (a book inspired by J. B. Priestley's 1949 book Delight) published by Waterstone's to raise money for Dyslexia Action and the London Library; Little Black Dress (edited by Susie Maguire); Midsummer Nights (edited by Jeanette Winterson), a collection to celebrate the 75th anniversary of Glyndebourne opera house in East Sussex; The Best Little Book Club in Town and The Coffee Shop Book Club in aid of Breast Cancer Care and Why Willows Weep (edited by Tracy Chevalier) in aid of the Woodland Trust (2011), Write (Guardian Books), Virago at 40 (edited by Lennie Goodings), Fifty Shades of Feminism (edited by Lisa Appignanesi, Rachel Holmes and Susie Orbach), Writing Historical Fiction (edited by Celia Brayfield and Duncan Sprott) and Anthology of World War I Literature for Children (edited by Michael Morpurgo) in 2014, in aid of the Royal British Legion and SSAFA.

Mosse has also written introductions to reissues of a number of works of fiction and non-fiction including Writers' & Artists Yearbook 2009, Captain Blood by Rafael Sabatini, We Need to Talk About Kevin by Lionel Shriver, Treasure Island by Robert Louis Stevenson, Goldfinger by Ian Fleming, Night Falls on the City by Sarah Gainham, A Chichester Miscellany by Phil Hewitt, Chichester Harbour: England's Coastal Gem by Liz Sagues, One Hundred Great Plays by Women by Lucy Kerbel.

In 2012, she published an anniversary book to celebrate 50 years of the Chichester Festival Theatre. Chichester Festival Theatre at Fifty is published by the crowd-funding publishing company Unbound.

Her first play, Syrinx, was part of the SkyArts Theatre Live project, devised by Sandi Toksvig. First performed in July 2009, it won a broadcasting press publicity award that same year. Mosse's second play Endpapers was part of the Bush Theatre's 2011 project Sixty-Six Books. Her monologue was inspired by the Book of Revelation, the final book in the Bible.

In September 2020, Mosse's own adaptation of her 2014 gothic thriller The Taxidermist's Daughter, set in 1912 in Fishbourne and Chichester, will première at Chichester Festival Theatre.

=== Journalism and broadcasting ===
Mosse writes for various newspapers and magazines, including The Times, Telegraph, Guardian and The Sunday Times and from 2008 to 2011 she wrote a regular column for the book trade magazine, The Bookseller. A regular guest on UK radio and television, she presented the BBC Four literary chat show Readers' and Writers' Roadshow and appears on the BBC Breakfast News and BBC2's The Review Show. She is a guest presenter for A Good Read on BBC Radio 4.

Mosse was the captain of the winning team of alumni from New College, Oxford, on Christmas Celebrity University Challenge in 2012. The team included the novelists Rachel Johnson and Patrick Gale. In January 2021, Kate Mosse launched #WomanInHistory, a global campaign of celebration inviting people to nominate a woman from history they thought should be better known.

== Honours and awards ==
Mosse was appointed Officer of the Order of the British Empire (OBE) in the 2013 Birthday Honours for services to literature and Commander of the Order of the British Empire (CBE) in the 2024 New Year Honours for services to literature, women and charity.

In 2000, she was named European Woman of Achievement for her contribution to the arts. In 2006, she was nominated for a Quill Award and won the British Book Awards Best Read of the Year for Labyrinth. She holds an Honorary MA from the University of Chichester. She was also the 2012 winner of "The Spirit of Everywoman Award", awarded by NatWest. In 2013, she was named as one of publishing Top 100 most influential people by the Bookseller and has appeared in every list since. She was named one of London's 1000 most influential people in the arts in 2013 by the Evening Standard.

In 2019, she was appointed visiting professor of Contemporary Literature and Creative Writing at the University of Chichester. She was elected a Fellow of the Royal Society of Literature in 2020.

== Personal life ==
She is married to playwright Greg Mosse and has two adult children.

In 1989, she and her husband bought a small house in Carcassonne in the Languedoc region of southwest France, the inspiration for her bestselling trilogy of historical timeslip novels. She moved back to her home town of Chichester in 1998 when she became the first female executive director of Chichester Festival Theatre. Her book An Extra Pair of Hands movingly describes the role of the carer, based on her experience caring for her parents and mother-in-law who all came to live with her in their final years.

== Media ==
In June 2023 Mosse was the invited guest on BBC Radio 4's long running radio series Desert Island Discs hosted by Lauren Laverne.

== Bibliography ==
=== Fiction ===
- Eskimo Kissing (1996)
- Crucifix Lane (1998)
- The Cave (Quick Reads Initiative novella, 2009)
- The Winter Ghosts (2009)
- The Mistletoe Bride & Other Haunting Tales (short stories, 2013)
- The Taxidermist's Daughter (2014)
- Marple: Twelve New Stories (2022) (contributed the short story "The Mystery of the Acid Soil")

==== Languedoc trilogy ====
1. Labyrinth (2005)
2. Sepulchre (2007)
3. Citadel (2012)

==== The Burning Chambers series ====
1. The Burning Chambers (2018)
2. The City of Tears (2020)
3. The Ghost Ship (2023)
4. The Map of Bones (2024)

=== Non-fiction ===
- Becoming a Mother (1993)
- The House: Behind the Scenes at the Royal Opera House, Covent Garden (1995)
- Chichester Festival Theatre at Fifty (2012)
- An Extra Pair of Hands (2021)
- Warrior Queens & Quiet Revolutionaries: How Women (Also) Built the World (2022)

=== Plays ===
- Syrinx (2009)
- Endpapers (2011)
- The Taxidermist's Daughter – adaptation (2020)
