= Labyrinth (miniseries) =

Based on Kate Mosse writings

- DVD cover
- Genre: Historical
- Based on: Labyrinth by Kate Mosse
- Screenplay by: Adrian Hodges
- Directed by: Christopher Smith
- Starring: Tom Felton; Jessica Brown Findlay; Vanessa Kirby; Tony Curran; Sebastian Stan; Katie McGrath; Emun Elliott; John Hurt
- Theme music composer: Trevor Jones
- Countries of origin: Germany; South Africa
- Original language: English
- No. of episodes: 2

Production
- Executive producers: Tim Halkin; Liza Marshall; Rola Bauer; Jonas Bauer; Adrian Hodges
- Producers: Moritz Polter; Christopher Hall
- Running time: 180 min
- Production companies: Tandem Communications; Scott Free
- Budget: $20 million

Original release
- Network: Sat.1
- Release: 2012

Labyrinth is a historical television miniseries based on the 2005 novel of the same name by Kate Mosse. The setting jumps between modern and medieval France and follows two women (played by Vanessa Kirby and Jessica Brown Findlay) who are searching for the Holy Grail. Other cast members include Katie McGrath, Tom Felton, Sebastian Stan, Emun Elliott, Tony Curran, and John Hurt. Adrian Hodges adapted the novel for the series, which was directed by Christopher Smith.

A German-South African co-production, the two-part series was filmed on location in the medieval town of Carcassonne in southwest France and Cape Town, South Africa. The executive producers were Tim Halkin, Liza Marshall, Ridley Scott, Tony Scott, Rola Bauer, Jonas Bauer, and Hodges.

The series aired in Canada, Korea, Poland and Portugal in autumn 2012, in Sweden in December 2012, the UK in March 2013, the U.S. in May 2014, and was set to air in Austria and Germany early 2013. The running time was originally announced, and is still stated on the official website, as being "four hours". However, the broadcast version only runs for three hours.

== Overview ==
The series follows two women—medieval Alaïs Pelletier du Mas (Jessica Brown Findlay), who lives through the Crusades and Cathar massacres in medieval France, and modern-day Alice Tanner (Vanessa Kirby)—in their quest to find the Holy Grail. Alice, a volunteer at a French archaeological excavation, discovers the skeletal remains of two people in a cave, as well as a labyrinth-engraved ring, which attracts the attention of unscrupulous individuals. In 1209, newly married Alaïs is living in Carcassonne, a stronghold of Cathars who have been declared heretical by the Catholic Church. Alaïs and her father are protecting three sacred books, which reveal the secret of the Holy Grail, from the Crusaders.

== Plot ==
=== Episode 1 ===
Alice Tanner is working at an excavation in France when she finds something. As she does, an earthquake is present. Upon hearing voices, seemingly whispering her name, she is drawn into a cave. She finds the remains of two skeletons. On one of the skeletons she finds a labyrinth-engraved ring which she takes. As she slips it on her finger, she is taken back as if she was drunk. She starts calling out as if someone is with her whispering until she is seemingly attacked in her abdomen, her shirt stained with blood. When she exits the cave, she is not in her own world. She walks along as people in white, the Catholics, are burning people alive. One woman notices her and holds out a brown journal of sorts. Before Alice can grasp it, the scene changes.

It is now Alaïs Pelletier, who we now know was the woman holding the book out to Alice, lying in a bed with her husband beside her. She thinks she has left him asleep as she leaves, but he is awake. Alaïs then gets ready to go to a river, and it is revealed that at the moment, the event takes place in Carcassonne, Southern France, in 1209.

Alaïs arrives at a shallow riverbank, and as she retrieves something in the riverbank, she sees a hand with a missing thumb floating not too far from where she is. The scene then shifts to Alice, who is back in the modern world, getting carried out of the cave on a stretcher. Disoriented, Alice asks her friend what happened. Her friend explains that she fainted in the cave. Alice then inquires about the mysterious ring, leaving her friend confused. While Alice is stretchered away, her friend goes back into the cave to look for the ring.

At the medic tent, Alice explains to the attendant that she had been stabbed in her abdomen and that it was vivid, as she saw blood, people getting burned, and a woman whom she thinks is familiar. The attendant dismisses her, stating that she's hallucinating and that she needs to see a doctor when she gets home. Her friend arrives shortly after, admonishing Alice for her reckless actions. Her friend then asks Alice where exactly she had dropped the ring, to no avail as Alice struggles to recall. Disgruntled, her friend storms out of the tent, leaving Alice who struggles to process what had happened. Then Alice reaches into her pocket and pulls out the bracelet she discovered earlier.

Back in Carcassonne, Alaïs catches up to her father, Bertrand, telling him that there is a body in the river, seemingly of noble descent, and that the thumb of his hand had been severed. Upon inspection, the victim and Bertrand were acquaintances.

== Cast and characters ==
- Tom Felton as Viscount Trencavel
- Vanessa Kirby as Alice Tanner
- Jessica Brown Findlay as Alaïs Pelletier du Mas, Guilhem's wife and Oriane's younger half-sister.
- Sebastian Stan as Will Franklyn, an author and Marie-Cecile's boyfriend.
- Emun Elliott as Guilhem du Mas, Alaïs' husband and Oriane's lover.
- Tony Curran as Guy d'Évreux
- John Hurt as Audric Baillard
- Katie McGrath as Oriane Congost, Alaïs' widowed older half-sister and Guilhem's lover.
- John Lynch as Simon de Montfort
- Bernhard Schir as Paul Authie
- Matthew Beard as Sajhe
- Claudia Gerini as Marie-Cecile de l'Oradore
- Danny Keogh as Bertrand Pelletier, Alaïs and Oriane's father
- Janet Suzman as Esclarmonde
- Lena Dörrie as Rixende
- Isabella-Rose Tsinonis as Bertrande, Alais' daughter.

== Production ==
=== Background ===
The novel Labyrinth was written by English author Kate Mosse and published in 2005. It was the best-selling fiction title in 2006 in the United Kingdom and reached The New York Times bestseller list. The novel has also been translated and published in 38 languages worldwide.

=== Development ===
Variety reported in March 2011 that Ridley Scott was developing a television adaptation of Labyrinth. The production is a collaboration between Scott's Scott Free production company, Tandem Communications (Germany), and Film Afrika Worldwide (South Africa), and in association with Universal Production Partners (Czech Republic). It is considered a German-South African co-production. Scott Free and Tandem previously collaborated on the miniseries The Pillars of the Earth. The screenplay was adapted by Adrian Hodges. Christopher Smith was signed on to direct.

Filming began October 10, 2011, in the medieval town of Carcassonne in southwest France, before moving to Cape Town, South Africa in December. Production designer Tom Hannam recreated parts of Carcassonne at Cape Town Film Studios. The set created for the series has been kept as a permanent structure at the studio. The cinematographer is Australian Robert Humphreys

The series has a total running time of 180 minutes and is split in two parts.

== Broadcast ==
In the fall of 2012, the series aired on Showcase in Canada, AXN in Korea, TVCine in Portugal, and Canal + Film in Poland. It aired on Sat.1 in Germany, Channel 4 in the United Kingdom, 6ter in France, Telecinco in Spain, on SOHO in Australia and ORF in Austria during 2013, in Denmark on the DR1 TV station on 25/26 March 2013, and aired in the United States as a two-night event on The CW on May 22/23, 2014. It came back to U.S. television as a four-hour-long mini-series on SyFy on Wednesday, December 23, 2015. Labyrinth is distributed worldwide by Tandem.

== Reception ==
Reviewing Labyrinth for The New York Times, Mike Hale gave it a negative assessment. Hale stated "Always wanted to know more about Catharism and the Albigensian Crusade? After watching Labyrinth, you may actually know less." Hale added "Labyrinth is too plodding and literal to rise to the level of camp, which could have saved it. Some of the modern scenes have the advantage of location filming in Carcassonne, which helps distract you from the mostly indifferent performances."

Reviewing Labyrinth for The Philadelphia Inquirer, David Hiltbrand praised the show. Hiltbrand said, "Labyrinth is a challenging viewing proposition, demanding close attention and patience." Hiltbrand also said, "There are excellent siege and battle scenes (particularly by TV standards). And the cast, which includes Tom Felton, Sebastian Stan, Katie McGrath, Tony Curran, John Lynch, and others, is large and appealing."
