= Rotary Racer =

Rotary Racer is a Greenpower team which began in 2005 as an initiative within Chipping Sodbury School to try to get 'Lads and Dads' working together on a project to build and race their own electric racing cars. The team has grown, with 9 different cars being built in the past 9 years. The team is made up of both girls and boys, ranging between the ages of 11 and 18.

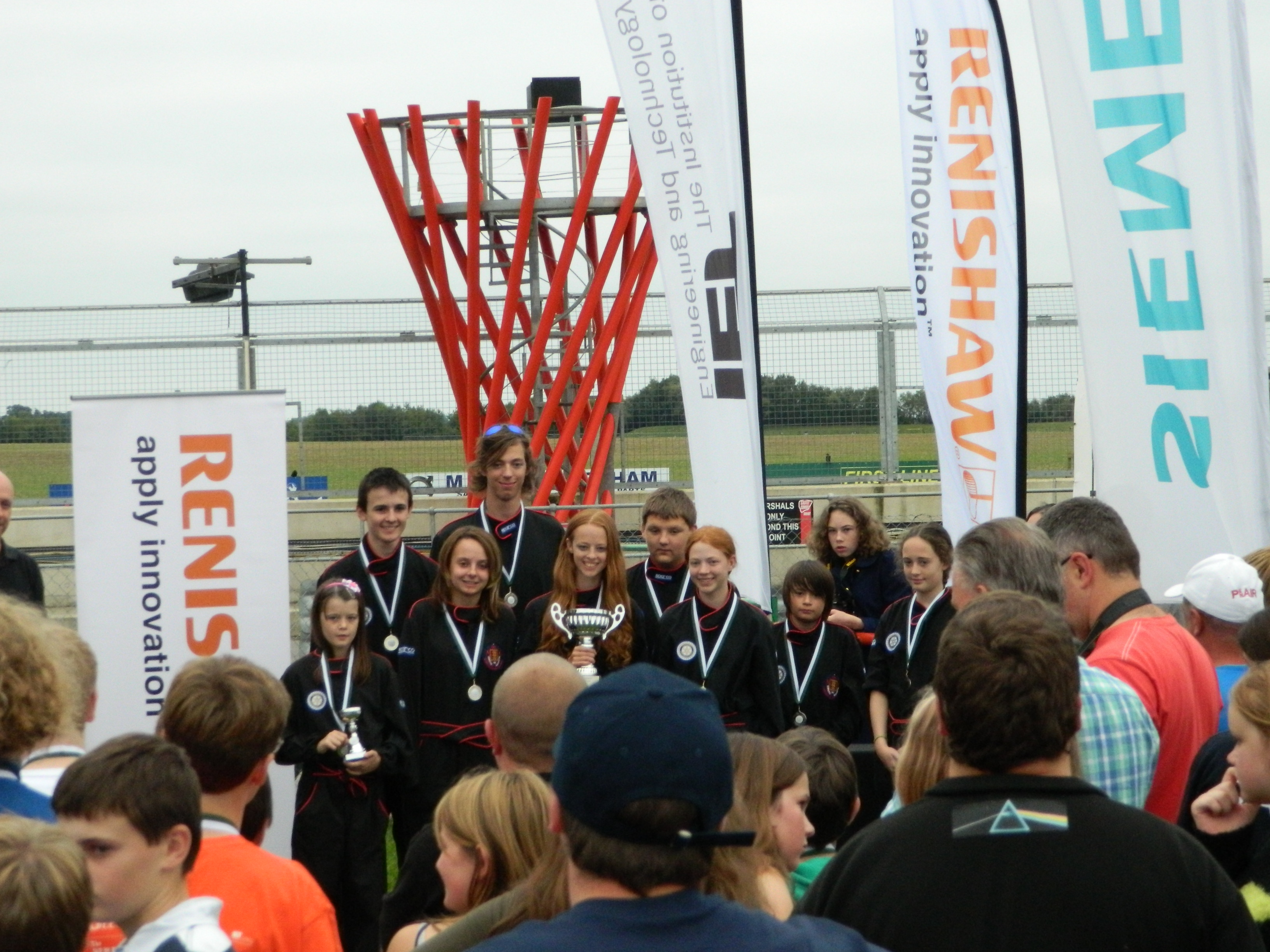
Rotary Racer wins Castle Combe 2013 Greenpower

The name Rotary Racer came from the team's first sponsor, Rotary International of Chipping Sodbury. This charity provided the funding needed to start the car from scratch and have continued to sponsor the team each season. Over the years, additional sponsors have enabled the team to continue racing as well as improve the car. The sponsors include:

- St Gobain Performance Plastics
- Towns Land Trust, Chipping Sodbury
- FairDiesel
- Wates
- CTEK Chargers
- BLD Group
- RAF
- Schwalble
- Beam Ltd
- Apec Ltd

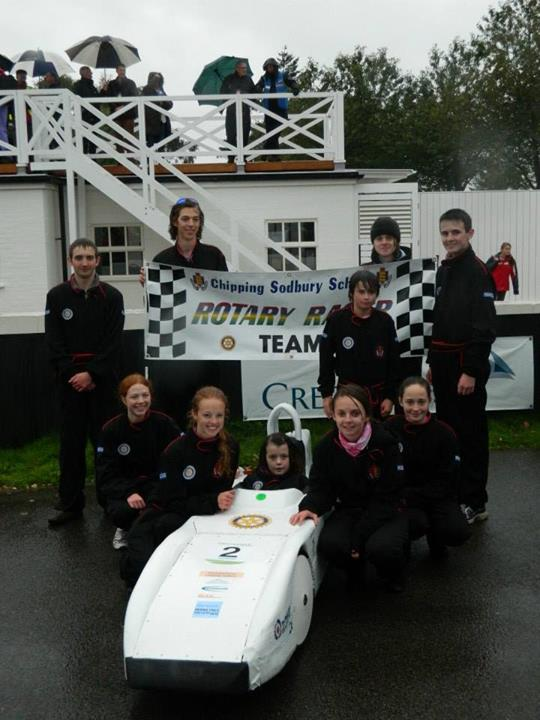
Winning at the 2013 National Greenpower Finals

Since 2005, the team has won the national championship (held at Goodwood Circuit or Rockingham Motor Speedway) five times out of the eight years.

- 2008 2nd in the Country
- 2009 National Champions
- 2010 3rd in the Country
- 2011 National Champions
- 2012 National Champions
- 2013 National Champions
- 2014 2nd Internationally
- 2015 International Champions
- 2016 5th Internationally
- 2017 5th Internationally

Rotary Racer takes part in the two 1-hour endurance races (F24) and the F24+ race (for sixth formers).

Are they still Active?

The team is no longer active anymore and no longer participate in Greenpower events.
