= Furze Platt Senior School =

Location
- Furze Platt Road; Maidenhead, Berkshire, SL6 7NQ; England; 51.536192°N 0.740762°W

Information
- Type: Academy
- Motto: ACHIEVE
- Religious affiliation: None
- Established: 23 April 1963
- Local authority: Royal Borough of Windsor and Maidenhead
- Department for Education URN: 137740 Tables
- Ofsted: Reports
- Chair of governors: Katie Mair
- Headteacher: Andrew Morrison
- Staff: 230 (approx.)
- Gender: Mixed
- Age: 11 to 18
- Enrolment: 1500
- Houses: Eagle, Falcon, Hawk, Osprey
- Colours: Navy blue and amber
- Website: Official website

Furze Platt Senior School is a mixed comprehensive secondary school with academy status in Maidenhead. The school draws pupils from across Maidenhead, Berkshire and Buckinghamshire.

The school's latest OFSTED inspection which was conducted on 10 March 2026 scored the school under the new Ofsted grading system as meeting the "Expected standard" on all other accounts while meeting a "Strong standard" in personal development and wellbeing.

== Extracurricular activities ==
Furze Platt Senior School offers a range of extracurricular activities, including clubs for art, music, sport, drama, debating, engineering and gardening as well as many academic clinics to support students in exam years. These activities operate either throughout the academic year or on a termly basis and are intended to complement pupils' academic studies and personal interests.

The school regularly stages music and theatrical productions and supports a variety of musical ensembles and sports teams.

The school also participates in the Duke of Edinburgh's Award programme and offers opportunities for pupils to complete the Bronze, Silver and Gold awards.

== Greenpower ==
According to school records Furze Platt first competed in Greenpower in 2001. The team won the Greenpower International Finals in 2004 and 2005 with a car named "Turbo Tortoise". Furze Platt Senior School still participates in the Greenpower Challenge, a national initiative run by the Greenpower Educational Trust where students design, build, and race electric cars across circuits in the UK.

== Notable former pupils ==
- Andy King – footballer
- Jessica Brown Findlay – actress
- Rob Williams – Olympic rower
- Georgie Singleton (now Bevan) – Olympic judo athlete
