= Duncan Sprott =

British novelist (born 1952)

Duncan Sprott is a novelist living in Ireland.

== Life ==
Sprott was born in 1952. He attended the University of St Andrews where he read Theology, and was awarded the G. W. Anderson Prize for Hebrew. He then attended the Heatherley School of Fine Art and ended up teaching English, Greek and Drama for 13 years. He has been a full-time writer since 1990, his novels having been translated into many languages and which are mostly set within a historical backdrop. He was awarded an Arts Council Literature Bursary in 1995 and his journalism has appeared in most of the major national newspapers. He currently resides in Ireland.

== Writing ==
=== Novels ===
==== Independent novels ====
- The Clopton Hercules (1991)
- The Rise of Mr. Warde (1992)
- Our Lady of the Potatoes (1995)

===== Ptolemies Quartet (ongoing) =====
- The House of the Eagle (2004)
- Daughter of the Crocodile (2006)

=== Nonfiction ===
- 1784 (1984)
- Sprottichronicon: A Millennium Cracker (2000)
- Writing Historical Fiction: A Writers' and Artists' Companion (with Celia Brayfield (2014)
