= Pic de Soularac =

Mountain in France

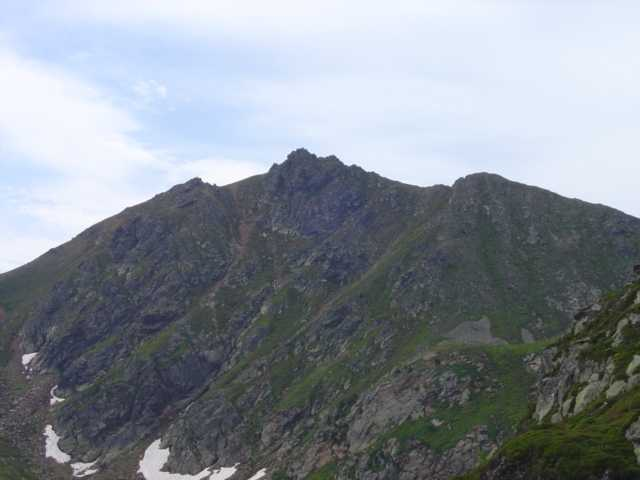

Highest point
- Elevation: 2,368 m (7,769 ft)
- Prominence: 1,007 m (3,304 ft)
- Listing: Ribu
- Coordinates: 42°49′04″N 1°46′54″E

Geography
- Location within Pyrenees
- Location: Midi-Pyrénées, France
- Parent range: Pyrenees

The Soularac is a summit in the French Pyrenees, culminating at a height of 2,368 m (7,769 ft) in the Tabe Massif. It has a prominence of 1007 m (3,304 ft) and its nearest highest neighbour is the Pic de Noé.
