= Greenpower Education Trust =

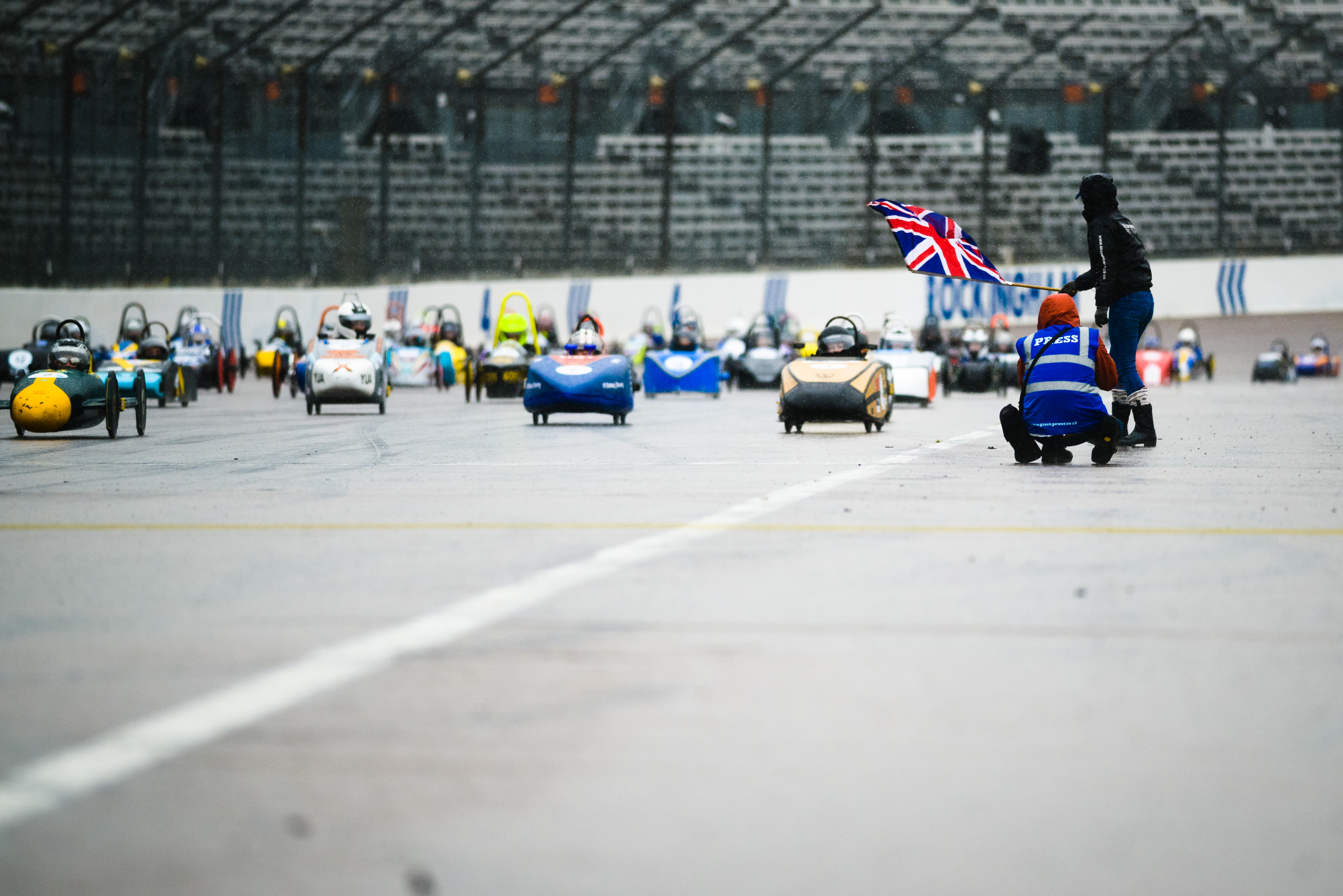
Grid of the IET F24 Final 2018 at Rockingham Motor Speedway.

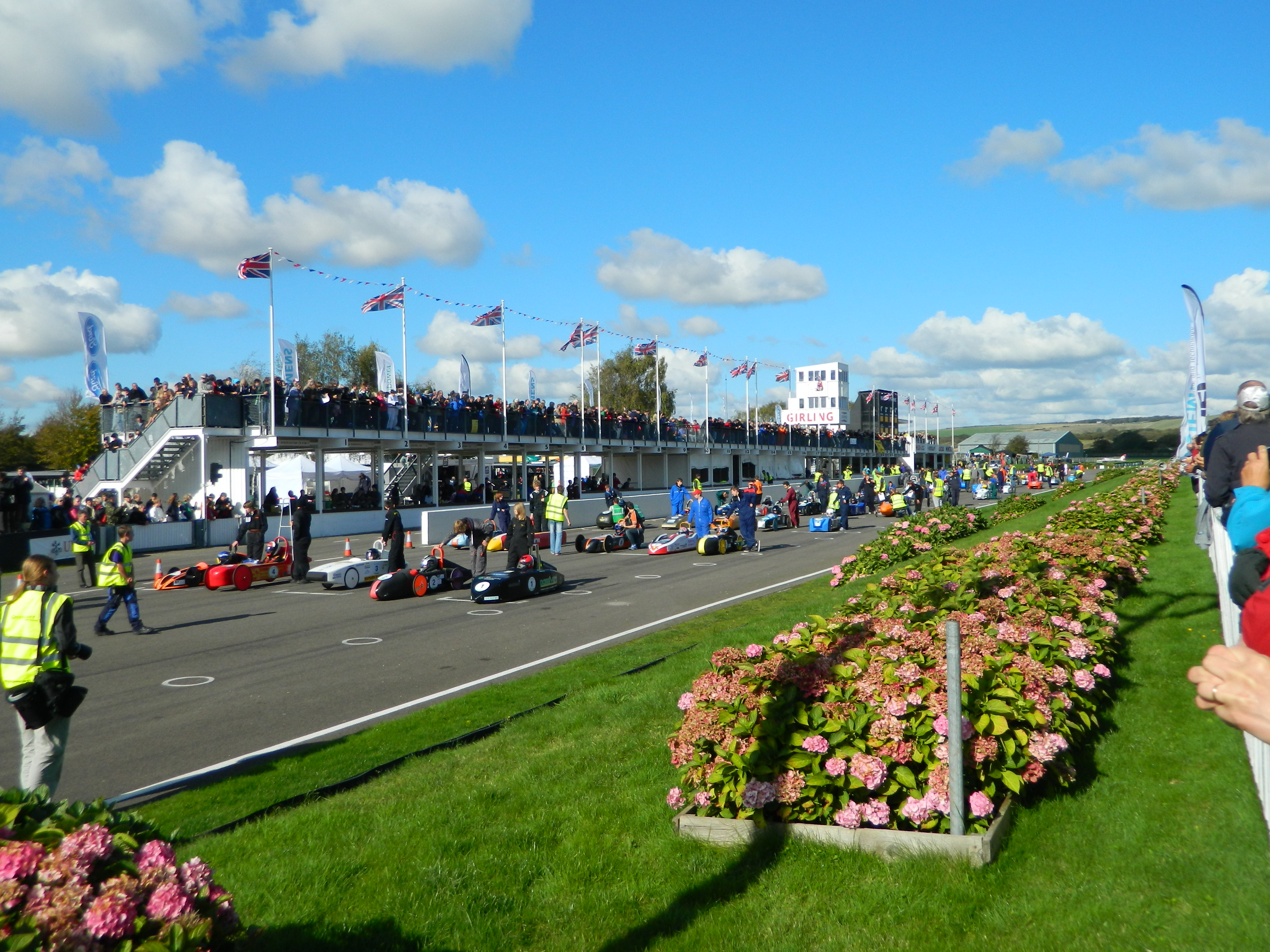
Goodwood Final Line up 2013 Greenpower.

The Greenpower Education Trust is a charitable organization, whose objective is to inspire more young people to become engineers by presenting the engineering industry as an interesting and relevant career choice which could help to solve problems relating to the personal, social and emotional development (known in Britain as PSED) of individuals and societies. The main idea is for teams of students between the ages of 9 and 25 to design, build, and race their own electric powered race cars on top racing circuits such as Goodwood.

== History ==
The trust originated from a study by Sussex Chamber of Commerce in 1998 which considered the needs of engineering companies in that region. The investigation revealed low levels of interest in science, technology, engineering and mathematics (the so-called STEM school subjects).

The Greenpower project started in 1999 to encourage students to design, build and race their own electric race cars within professionally drafted specifications and only a small helping hand from experienced adults. Events are organized for weekends at major motor circuits around the UK to facilitate attendance from the general public. Circuits include Goodwood, Castle Combe and Dunsfold (the Top Gear test track).

Greenpower claims that it now works with 500 schools providing events around the UK. Its headquarters are at Fontwell in Southern England and Greenpower national events were run at the nearby Goodwood Motor Circuit whose owner is a Patron of Greenpower. Between 2015 and 2018, the International Final was held at Rockingham Motor Speedway in the middle of October as a two-day event. The final attracts some 170 cars from all over the UK and Ireland with a small number of entries from international teams in America, Poland and South Africa. The Corporate Challenge attracts entries from large companies and universities as far away as Poland, up to 2012 this had been held at Goodwood or Silverstone but in 2013 was amalgamated with the Final of the F24 championship.

On 30 June 2014, Greenpower announced a partnership with the FIA's Formula e racing series, running a support race for schools during the formula e race weekend.

== Categories ==
All Greenpower classes use a 24V, 240W Framco motor and pairs of 12V REC36-12 or YPC33-12 AGM batteries. These batteries are selected to be reasonably easy to lift, leak-proof and their discharge characteristics determine how fast the cars can go. The motor and batteries are sealed and cannot be modified.

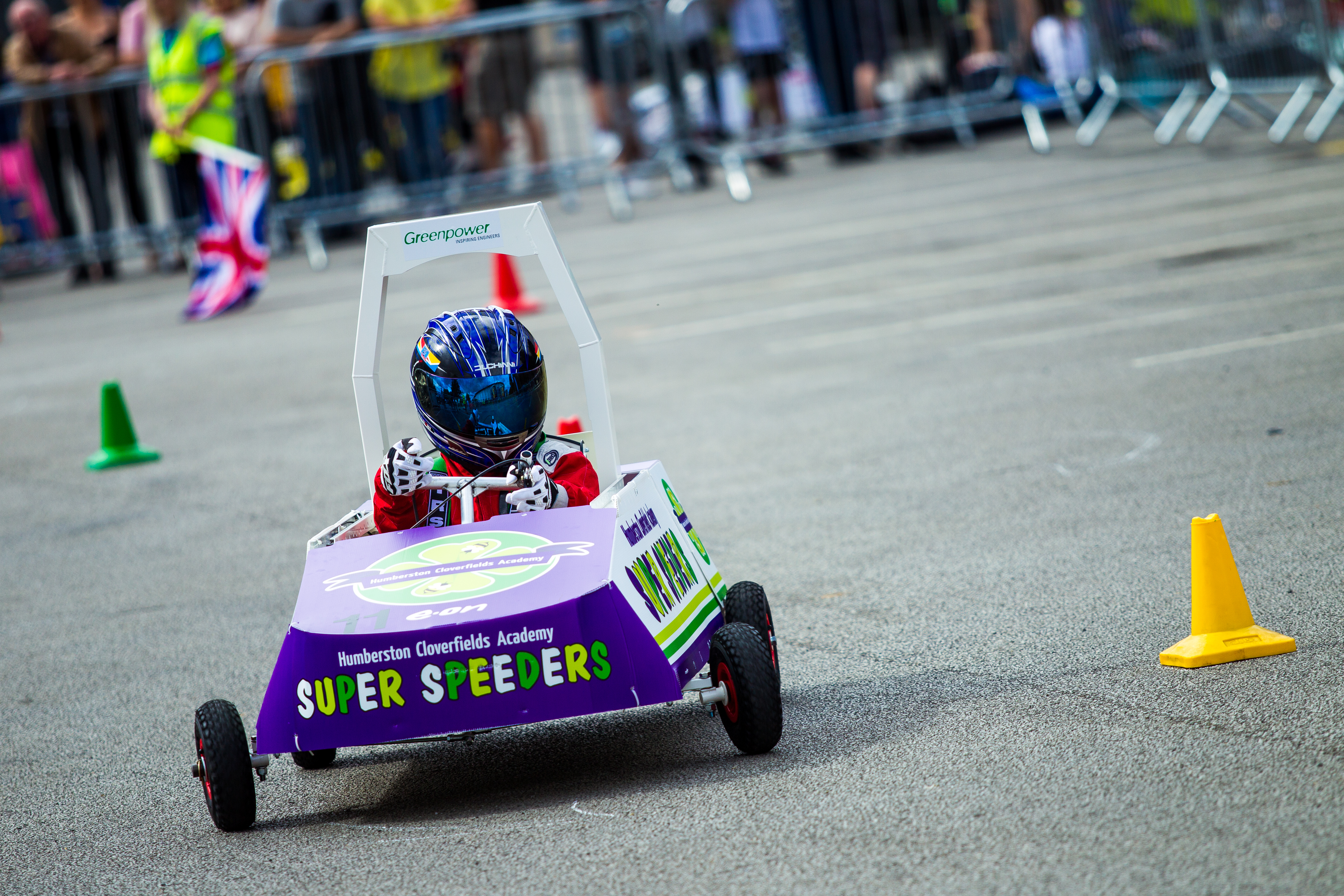
A Formula Goblin G2 kit car.

=== Formula Goblin ===
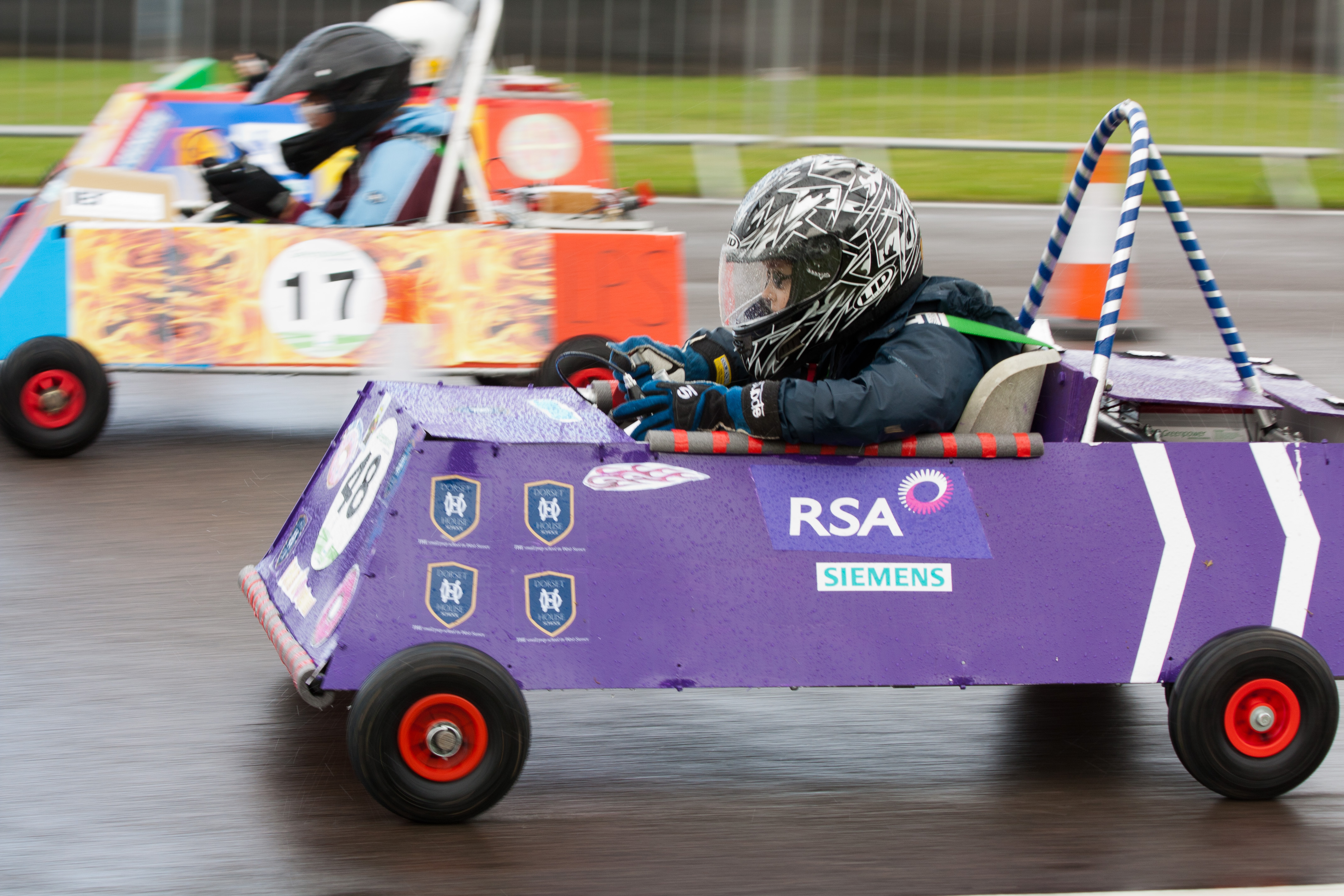
The Gathering of Goblins, at Goodwood Circuit

The Goblin Kit Car is offered by as a suitable platform for primary school children aged 9–11. The rules state only this kit may be used which ensures safety for all those competing. The kit includes all parts and components required to build a complete car - except for the bodywork which is left to the creativity of the team.

The motor and battery, together with comprehensive instructions are included. Only basic hand tools are required to assemble the kit, which can be dismantled at the end of the season and reused by another group.

Race days consist of many events, including that of a sprint race.

The new G2 chassis was released in the late 2010s by Greenpower to replace the old G1 'tubular-style' cars.

The kit is purchased from Greenpower and costs (2019) £1350.

=== Formula 24 ===
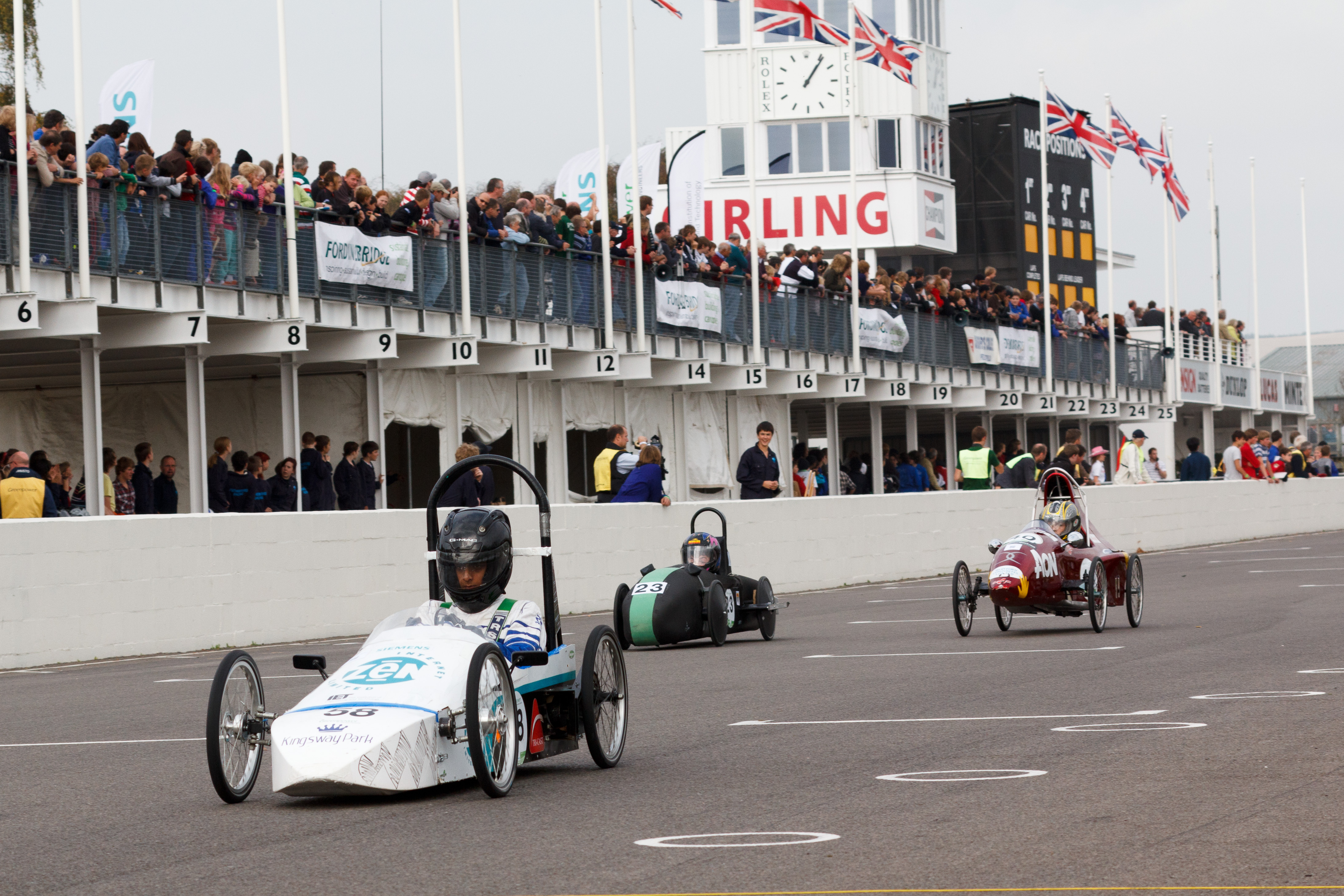
Greenpower Formula 24 Cars at the 2011 National Final, Goodwood

IET Formula 24 (F24) is the main racing category - 258 cars completed at least one competitive lap in 2018. It is open to 11- to 16-year-olds. Since then, the competition has grown to involve over 500 different schools, each hoping to race their way into the final.

The rules are built around the standard batteries and motor along with some safety-based rules. These are designed to be relatively open-ended and with room for innovation, leading to a huge variation in how the cars look. There is a kit car available to allow a simplified entry.

Up to 2013, F24 races consisted of a 4-hour endurance race, and teams could use six batteries in that time (80 minutes per pair of batteries). A minimum of five drivers were required to drive for a maximum of 90 minutes each. Typical average speeds were around 20-30 mph.

However, the rules were modified for the 2014 season to change the F24 race into a sprint style event. Teams are only allowed to use one pair of batteries per 90 minute race, with two races during the day. There must be a minimum of three drivers per race.

Prices cover a wide range as different teams use different designs, materials and techniques. The highest costing car doesn't necessarily give the best results. Top cars have ranged from the price of £1200 (excluding batteries and motor) up to approximately £9000. The motor and six batteries cost a total of £404 + VAT, while the kit car is £2750 + VAT (October 2018, includes motor, batteries, team registration and entry to the first race)

The technology and attention to detail evident in a top level F24/F24+ car should not be under-estimated, equivalent energy consumption of >3000mpge is commonplace, as such they can be regarded as being the most efficient racing cars anywhere in the world by a considerable margin.

=== Formula 24-Kit Car ===
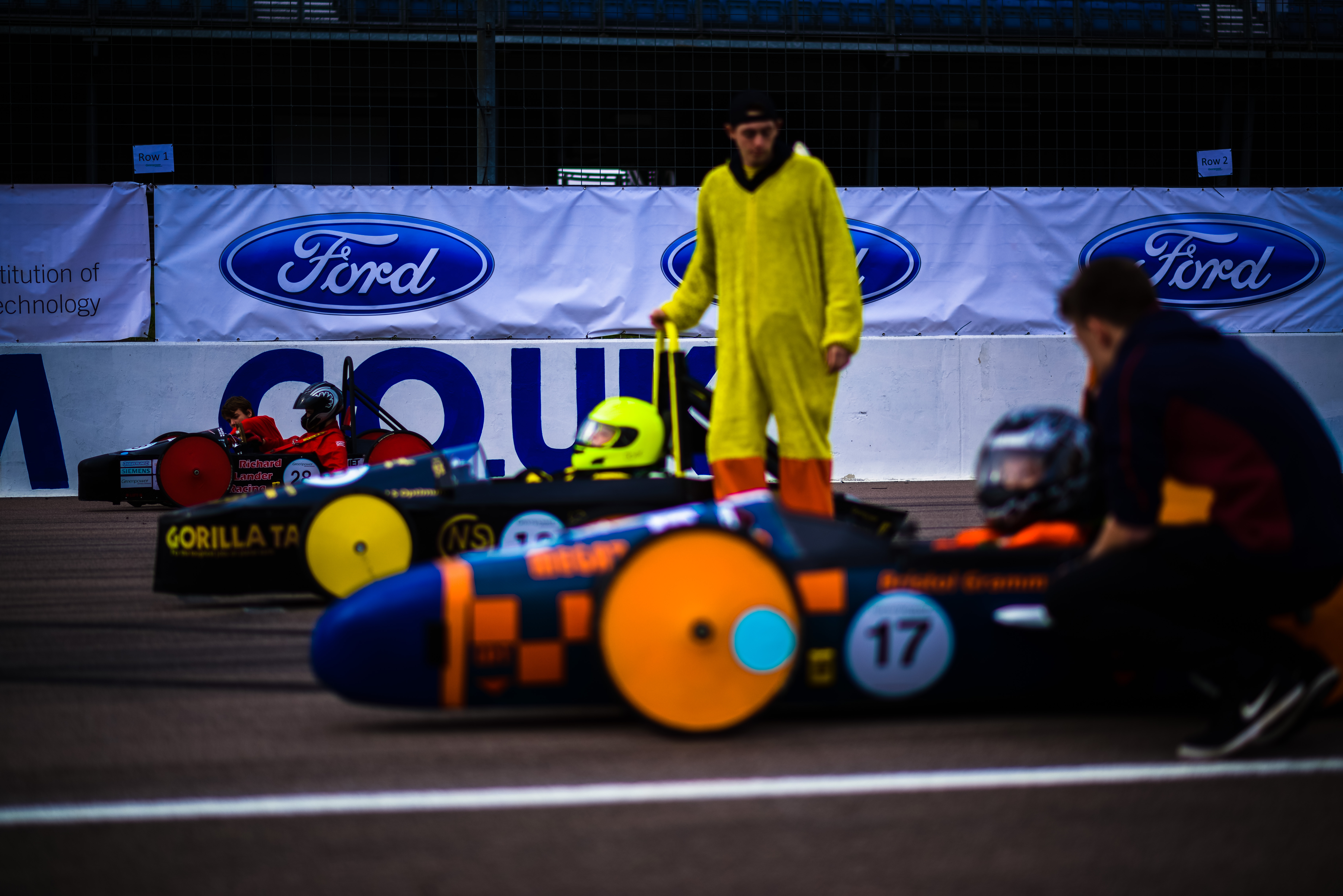
Megazord R2 - Bristol Grammar School, and The Chicken - Bromsgrove School line up on the front row of the 2018 IET F24 Kit Car Final.

Starting in 2014 an additional award has been given to the best kit car, this is unlike the main F24 championship in that the best result is taken from either of the two races per event as opposed to individual awards for each race. The inaugural kit car international championship was won by Megazord from Bristol Grammar School, with the chassis number 002 it is the first kit car ever sold.

=== Formula 24+ ===
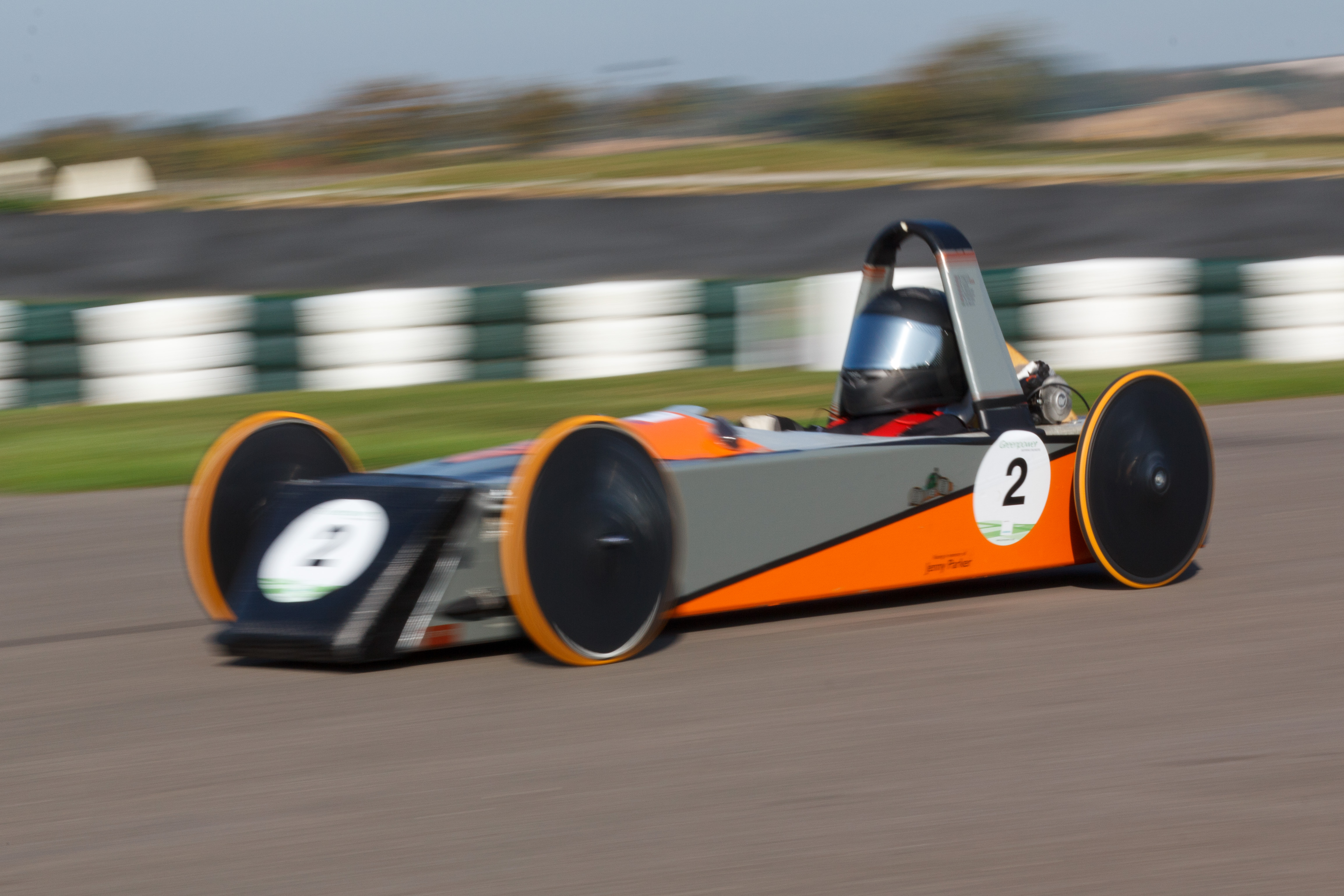
A Greenpower F24+ car, "Fireblade" driven by Ross competing at Goodwood in the final round of the 2011 Formula 24+ championship.

IET Formula 24+ is for young people aged 16 – 25 and is all about designing and building an electric car with technical regulations that are much the same as those for IET F24. Since 2013, the race has been incorporated with the Corporate Challenge (at some events where companies join the students racing).

Up to 2013, 24+ races lasted 90 minutes while using four batteries (45 minute per pair of batteries) leading to significantly higher speeds than F24. Average speeds range from 25 mph to nearly 40 mph (depending on the car and driver). Most teams only used one driver, but some would change during the battery pit stop.

The new rules in 2014 shortened this race to 60 minutes, with each race using only one pair of batteries. A minimum of one driver is required.

=== Participation ===
Any group of young people that fall into the age category can enter the Greenpower competition as a team (including units sponsored by private companies or public organizations such as primary schools and colleges, Institutes of secondary education, and also older people in youth groups, and universities etc.).

=== Greenpower USA Foundation ===
A variant of Greenpower also exists in the United States. The Greenpower USA Foundation started as a pilot program in 2011 and officially started in 2014. They are located in Huntsville, Alabama. Like the Greenpower Education Trust, Greenpower USA has a Goblin, F24, and F24+ category. Greenpower USA has its own national championship every year at the Talladega Superspeedway.

== Races ==
The F24 season has events held at race tracks around the UK, including Goodwood Circuit, Mallory Park and Dunsfold. The races last 90 minutes each (two in one day), and the distance completed in this time is submitted to a table of results. The car's greatest distance of the season ranks it in this table, with the top cars qualifying for the International Final, held in October.

The F24+ season consists of similar races, but a smaller number of events are held, in between the two F24 races. These races last 60 minutes, with points being awarded for position at the end of the race to the first 10 cars in the standard 1st = 25pts, 10th = 1pt system. Each cars best 2 regular season results, plus the result from the final round of the championship at the International Finals contribute to the points table.

Each race sees a number of awards being presented for engineering, innovation, presentation, best new team and the "Spirit of Greenpower".

Goblin events are run separately and each is slightly different depending on space and team numbers. At most events there are 3 events that take place: a slalom, a drag and a sprint. The slalom is against the clock, as is the drag race. Each is completed six times which allows for a large group of students to all get the thrill of driving, with the lowest time from each team used. The sprint is a short race (typically three laps) with a few cars on track, run as heats followed by finals as necessary. Points are awarded for each test (1st place = 1 point, 2nd place = 2 points etc.). There are also awards at Goblin events and these carry negative points, helping to reduce a team's score. The lowest overall score wins the event.

== International Finals ==
In 1999, the only race held was at Goodwood Motor Circuit, and, as such, is considered the National Final, despite there having been no qualification events in that year. Greenpower regulations have changed to reduce speeds of cars over the years, meaning the 2006 final still has the greatest recorded distance and the greatest average speed of any final (and any race other than the 2006 Race of Champions). Until 2006, cars could be fully enclosed, but for the 2007 season this was banned, followed by the wholesale ban on windscreens the next year, meaning all cars after this point have been fully open-cockpit. The 2006 season was also the last to feature 6 hour races. In 2011, the batteries supplied were changed, with a large reduction in available energy, reducing speeds. In 2014 the finals were restyled as the 'Greenpower International Finals', due to participation from teams from multiple countries, such as Silesian University of Technology. In December 2014, it was announced that due to space requirements, the 2015 International Final was to be held at Rockingham. Following Rockinghams closure shortly after the 2018 finals it was announced that the 2019 final would take place at Silverstone on 17 October in order to mark 20 years to the day since the first Greenpower event in 1999. In 2021 the finals returned to Goodwood Motor Circuit with a new 4 race format, due to restrictions from the COVID-19 pandemic which had also caused the 2020 event to be cancelled.

Year	Car	Team	Distance (miles)	Average Speed (mph)
1999	Dan Ger	Eastbourne College	85	14.2
2000	Eagle	St. Bede's School	118	19.7
2001	EB6	Equipe Bigenor	158.4	26.4
2002	The Boys R Back	St. Philip Howard R C School	147.9	24.65
2003	The Boys R Back	St. Philip Howard R C School	160.8	26.8
2004	Turbo Tortoise	Furze Platt Senior School	170.4	28.4
2005	Turbo Tortoise	Furze Platt Senior School	182.4	30.4
2006	The Slippery Trug	The Weald School	201.6	33.6
2007	The Phoenix	Seaford College	129.6	32.4
2008	Zebedee	Sandbach High School	115.2	28.8
2009	Rotary Racer	Chipping Sodbury School	120	30
2010	Zebedee	Sandbach High School	127.2	31.8
2011	Rotary Racer	Chipping Sodbury School	120	30
2012	Rotary Racer	Chipping Sodbury School	122	30.1
2013	Rotary Racer	Chipping Sodbury School	118	29.1
2014	The Black Bullet	The Weald School	91.2	30.2
2015	Rotary Racer	Chipping Sodbury School	43.65	29.1
2016	Dylan	Sandbach High School	44.87	29.9
2017	RLR 3	Richard Lander School	45.60	30.4
2018	RLR 3	Richard Lander School	41.99	28.0
2019	RLR 3	Richard Lander School	44.70	29.8
2021	BlueBird	The Weald School	43.62	32.7
2022	RLR 4	Richard Lander School	48.00	31.58
2023	RLR 3	Richard Lander School	52.35	34.89
2024	Apex	Southleigh Racing	46.74	31.16
2025	RLR 3	Richard Lander School	48.81	32.54

== Patrons and Partners ==
The Patrons of Greenpower are:

- The Earl of March, owner of Goodwood Motor Circuit and the Goodwood Festival of Speed
- David Richards CBE, chairman of Prodrive and Aston Martin
- Allan Cooke CBE, former Chairman of Atkins and SEMTA

The current complete list of partners is published by Greenpower. In 2014 those listed included:

- Siemens
- EDF Energy
- Institution of Engineering and Technology
- Newcastle University
- Royal Commission for the Exhibition of 1851
- Pearson
- Silverline
- Unipro
- Fordingbridge PLC
- Ford Motor Company
- Hogan Lovells
- Lockheed Martin
- The Institution of Mechanical Engineers
- Liverpool Motor Club
- Renishaw
- The Cornwall College Group
- Cummins
- The Cleveland Scientific Institution
- Staffordshire STEM Centre
- Dunsfold Park
- Aintree
- Prodrive
- Newquay Airport
- GoMotorsport
- The Insurance Partnership
- MotorSport Vision
- Sevcon
- Autosport International
