= Labyrinth (novel) =

2005 novel by Kate Mosse

- Author: Kate Mosse
- Series: Languedoc Trilogy
- Genre: Historical fiction
- Publisher: Orion
- Publication date: 2005
- Pages: 531
- ISBN: 978-0-7528-6053-4
- OCLC: 59353616
- Followed by: Sepulchre

Labyrinth is an archaeological mystery English-language novel written by Kate Mosse set both in the Middle Ages and present-day France. It was published in 2005.

It divides into two main storylines that follow two protagonists, Alaïs (from the year 1209) and Alice (in the year 2005). The two stories occur in a shared geography and intertwine. The novel relies heavily on historical events such as the massacre at Béziers and the Crusade against the Cathars in Occitania, now the South of France, from around 1200. The text itself features many Occitan and French quotes. Ultimately the story becomes a quest for the Holy Grail.

In the 2006 British Book Awards, Labyrinth was awarded Best Read of the Year. According to The Sunday Times, it was the second best selling book in the United Kingdom in 2006, after The Da Vinci Code, selling about 865,400 copies in paperback. The Guardian ranked it the number one bestseller for 2006. An extract from the novel was used in the Scottish Qualifications Authority's 2009 Standard Grade English General close reading paper.

== Plot ==
When Dr Alice Tanner, who works as a volunteer at the archaeological site of Pic de Soularac, in France, discovers two skeletons in a long-hidden cave in the hillside, she unearths a link with a horrific and brutal past. However, it is not just the sight of the shattered bones that makes her uneasy; there is an overwhelming sense of evil in the tomb that Alice finds hard to shake off, even in the bright French sunshine. Puzzled by the words carved inside the chamber and the representation of a labyrinth, she finds an exact representation of it on the underside of the ring she found in the cave.

Alice has an uneasy feeling that she has disturbed something that was meant to remain hidden. She finds a connection to the nightmares she had been having since childhood and discovers that the cave was related to her past.

Eight hundred years ago, on the night before a brutal civil war ripped apart Languedoc, three books were entrusted to Alaïs, a young herbalist and healer, the daughter of the steward of Carcassona. Although she cannot understand the symbols and diagrams the books contain, Alaïs knows her destiny lies in protecting their secret at all costs. The books contain the secrets to the Holy Grail. Alice later discovers that she is Alaïs's descendant.

== Television adaptation ==
A television adaptation of the novel adapted by Adrian Hodges and directed by Christopher Smith was released in 2012.
