= Sepulchre (novel) =

2007 book by Kate Mosse

- First edition
- Author: Kate Mosse
- Series: Languedoc Trilogy
- Genre: Historical fiction
- Publisher: Orion Books
- Publication date: 2007
- Preceded by: Labyrinth
- Followed by: Citadel

Sepulchre is a novel by the English author Kate Mosse. The story is based in two time periods, 1891 and present day (2007), and follows two female protagonists. It was published in 2007.

== Plot summary ==
In 1891, Léonie Vernier is a young girl living in Paris until an invitation from her uncle's widow Isolde prompts a journey to the Carcassonne region with her brother, Anatole. Unknown to Léonie, her brother had been having an affair with Isolde and is being pursued by her jealous former lover, Victor Constant. For a while, they live an idyllic lifestyle in the country. However, Constant discovers where they are staying and sets out to exact his revenge.

In the present day, an American, Meredith Martin, is in France to research the life of Claude Debussy for a biography she is writing. She is also trying to find out more about her biological mother. During the visit, she uncovers information that links her lineage to that of Léonie Vernier and discovers the truth about the events in Carcassonne during that period in history.

Most of the action takes place in the Domaine de la Cade, a stately home in Rennes-les-Bains, which in 1891 is owned by Léonie's deceased uncle Jules and his wife Isolde, whom Anatole later marries. The house in Meredith's timeline has been repurposed as an upmarket hotel.

There are also parts of the book that are situated in Paris at the same time, as well as parts in towns and villages neighbouring Carcassonne.

The story features heavy reference to the occult and tarot readings, and the stories of Léonie and Meredith are brought together by a series of visions that are related to the tarot and a small church, known as a Sepulchre, in the grounds of the Domaine de la Cade.

Several of the major characters in Mosse's novel Labyrinth make cameo appearances in Sepulchre. Film rights are under negotiation.
