= Celia Brayfield =

English author, journalist and cultural commentator

Celia Brayfield (born 1945) is an English author, academic and cultural commentator.

== Biography ==
Brayfield was born in the north London suburb of Wembley Park. She won a place at St Paul's Girls' School in Hammersmith, West London, and spent a year as a foreign student in France, at the Universitaire de Grenoble, studying French language and literature.

She was a journalist for several years and published her first book in 1985.

In 2023, she is a lecturer at Bath Spa University. Between 1988 and 2003 she was a trustee of Gingerbread. From 2013 to 2016 she was a trustee of the Friends of Watlington Library.

She has one daughter and lives in Dorset.

== Career ==
During her first career as a journalist, she specialized in media issues, with columns in the Evening Standard and The Times as well as contributions to many other newspapers and magazines.

Following her childhood role model, Robert Louis Stevenson, Brayfield decided to begin her writing career as a journalist and joined Nova magazine as a trainee sub-editor. She progressed to The Observer as assistant to the women's editor and moved to the Evening Standard. She was hired as a media columnist by Simon Jenkins in 1974 and moved to The Times as a television critic in 1982.

After the birth of her daughter Chloe in 1980, Brayfield decided to write a novel. Her Fleet Street experience of celebrity culture led to her first book as sole author of Glitter: The Truth About Fame, a non-fiction study commissioned by feminist editor Carmen Callil at Chatto & Windus. Shortly afterward, Callil commissioned Brayfield's first novel, Pearls. Her novels have been optioned by film producers including Cruise-Wagner/Paramount. After the success of her first novel she focused on contemporary social comedies set in millennial London and its suburbs.

She has taught at the Arvon Foundation and Tŷ Newydd and founded W4W, a writers' workshop in West London. Until 2003 she was co-founder and co-director of the National Academy of Writing, which was subsequently linked to the University of Central England.

In 2005, she joined the staff of Brunel University London to set up the creative writing program, becoming a reader in 2006 and an associate reader in 2015. She is also a senior lecturer at Bath Spa University and a member of the Higher Education Committee of the National Association of Writers in Education.

Brayfield developed a growing interesting in how writers learn to write while doing the rounds of promotion tours and literary festivals. Audience questions led to a series of lectures which were the foundation for Bestseller: Secrets of Successful Writing commissioned by Victoria Barnsley at Fourth Estate.

Brayfield has judged several national literary awards, including the Betty Trask Award, the Macmillan Silver Pen Award and the Authors Club First Novel Prize. She served on the committee of management of The Society of Authors from 1995 to 1998.

== Publications ==
Fiction

- Wild Weekend, Time Warner Books, 2004
- Mister Fabulous and Friends, Time Warner Books, 2003
- Heartswap Little, Brown, 2000, Time Warner Books 2001
- Sunset, Little, Brown, 1999, Warner Books 2000.
- Getting Home Little, Brown & Warner Books
- Harvest Viking 1995, Penguin 1996, Warner Books 1996
- White Ice Viking 1993, Penguin 1994
- The Princess Fanfare 1992
- The Prince Chatto & Windus 1990, Penguin, 1991
- Pearls Chatto & Windus 1987, Penguin 1986, Warner Books 1997

Non-fiction

- Writing Black Beauty Pegasus Books 2023
- Rebel Writers: The Accidental Feminists Bloomsbury Caravel 2021
- Writing Historical Fiction with Duncan Sprott, Bloomsbury Academic 2014
- Arts Reviews Kamera Books, 2008
- Deep France Pan Macmillan, 2004
- Bestseller: Secrets of Successful Writing Fourth Estate, 1996
- Glitter: The Truth About Fame Chatto & Windus, 1985

Academic

- New Writing international peer-reviewed journal of Creative Writing, Special Edition, Routledge, 2010 Celia co-edited, with Professor Graeme Harper and Dr Andrew Green, a special edition of New Writing, a leading international peer-reviewed journal for Creative Writing, dedicated to staff and students of the Brunel Creative Writing Program. Her own papers included in the edition: Creative Writing: the FAQ and Babelfish Babylon.

Journalism

- Fancy food is enough to turn your stomach The Times, 23 December 2009
- The Times Christmas Books: Travel the Times, 28 November 2009
- Bombay Sapphires: The Immortals by Amit Chaudhuri The Times, Saturday 14 March 2009
- The Last Supper: A Summer in Italy by Rachel Cusk The Times, 30 January 2009
- In Search of a Feeling for Snow: The Times Christmas Books 2008: Travel The Times, 28 November 2008
- Horticultural Who's Who: Abderrazak Benchaabane BBC Gardens Illustrated July 2008
- It's not hard to say goodbye (to the hardback book) The Times, 21 November 2007
- A Faraway Look in their Eyes (travel writing) The Times, 6 December 2007
- Rhett Butler's People by Donald McCaig The Times, 2 November 2007
- Farewell to Harry (and the bean-counters) The Times, 21 July 2007
- Get your kicks on Route 312 The Times, 30 June 2007
- It is a truth universally.... oh give it a rest, will you (Austen adaptations) The Times, 12 March 2007
- Roll up, roll up and watch the Mona Lisa weep The Times, 19 February 2007
- Taking On Goliath: L'Oréal Took My Home by Monica Waitzfelder The New Statesman, 19 February 2007
- Required Reading: Shadow of the Silk Road Colin Thubron The Times, 9 September 2006
- The Lion, the Witch and the Inklings The Times, 22 November 2005
- I’m a Different Person Now: Serious Head Injury (interview), The Times, 9 July 2005.
- Far Far Better Things The Times, 2 July 2005
- So Your Cat Died (exam marking) The Times, 9 May 2005
- The Discerning Woman Isn't Easy to Please (launch of Easy Living magazine) The Times, T2 cover story, 2 March 2005.
- Brits tame the wild frontiers: one in three wants to emigrate, but the expats will still write home for marmalade The New Statesman 14 June 2004
