= Niall MacCormick =

Scottish director

Niall MacCormick is a Scottish film and television director. His credits include the feature-length comedy-drama The Long Walk to Finchley, Firewall (the second feature-length episode of Wallander) and The Song of Lunch (starring Alan Rickman and Emma Thompson). All of these were created for BBC Television. He directed The Game in 2013, and won a BAFTA in 2014 for the Channel 4 film Complicit. In 2019, he directed the acclaimed BBC mini-series The Victim. In 2023, he directed the BBC series Rebus (Eleventh Hour Films/Viaplay).
