= William Ireland (Jesuit) =

English Jesuit and martyr (1636–1679)

Blessed William Ireland SJ
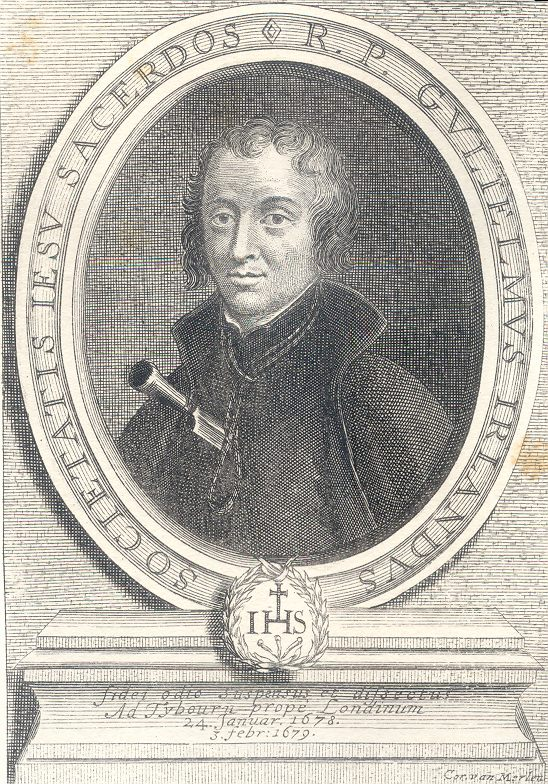

Martyr
- Born: c.1636 Lincolnshire, England
- Died: 24 January 1679 (aged 42–43); Tyburn, London, England
- Honored in: Roman Catholic Church
- Beatified: 15 December 1929, Rome by Pope Pius XI
- Feast: 24 January

William Ireland (1636 – 24 January 1679) was an English Jesuit and martyr from Lincolnshire. He was falsely accused of conspiring to murder King Charles II during the Popish Plot hysteria, and was executed on 24 January 1679. He was beatified in 1929 by Pope Pius XI and his feast day is celebrated on 24 January, the day of his death.

== Early life ==
Ireland was the eldest son of William Ireland of Crofton Hall, Yorkshire, by Barbara, a daughter of Ralph Eure, 3rd Baron Eure of Washingborough, Lincolnshire, by his first wife Mary Dawnay. William was born in Lincolnshire in 1636. He had several sisters, to whom he remained close, and who worked tirelessly to prove his innocence during the Plot. Ireland was educated at the English College at St. Omer; admitted to the Society of Jesus at age 19 at Watten in 1655; studied theology in Liege and was ordained a priest in 1667. For several years he was a confessor to the Poor Clares at Gravelines.

== Popish Plot ==
In 1677, Ireland was sent on the English Mission and appointed procurator of the province. On the night of 28 September 1678, he was arrested by constables led by Titus Oates, the inventor of the Plot and taken before the Privy Council. Among those who shared his fate was John Grove, a layman and the nominal occupier of that part of Wild House, London, occupied by the Jesuits and the Spanish Embassy; also Thomas Jenison and John Fenwick. Together with Thomas Pickering, Ireland and Grove were said to have planned on 19 August, in the rooms of the Jesuit William Harcourt, to assassinate King Charles II at Newmarket, and William Bedloe swore that Grove was to have £1500 for the job and Pickering 30,000 Masses. The sworn testimony of Oates and Bedloe impressed the jury, despite their unsavoury reputation, and Chief Justice William Scroggs summed up against Ireland. Despite Ireland's impressive alibi, which was later to gravely embarrass the Crown, and much evidence of his accusers' bad reputation, produced by his sisters, he was found guilty.

After being confined in Newgate Prison, Ireland was sentenced to death on 17 December. Ireland wrote a journal in Newgate, which accounted for virtually every day of his absence from London between 3 August and 14 September. It has been said that this account, which was supported by several credible witnesses such as Mrs. Jane Harwell of Wolverhampton, in whose house he had stayed during the crucial period, gave the judges more trouble than any other single piece of evidence produced for the accused during the Plot Trials. The King having heard Ireland's alibi said that "he had no manner of satisfaction in the truth of the evidence (i.e. the evidence against Ireland), but rather of its falsehood". However, a servant girl called Sarah Paine (of whom very little is known) swore that she saw Ireland in Fetter Lane on 20 August, and the judges ruled that this in itself disproved Ireland's alibi.

Blessed John Grove
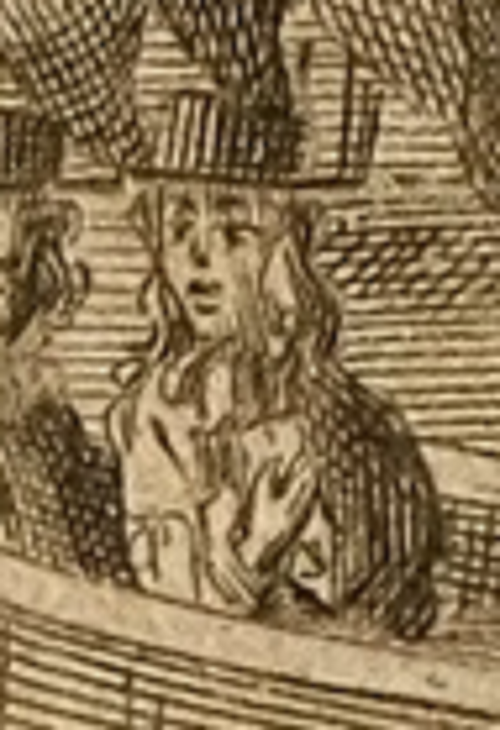
- Detail of a Popish Plot card drawn by Francis Barlow

Martyr
- Died: 24 January 1679; Tyburn, London, England
- Beatified: 15 December 1929 by Pope Pius XI
- Feast: 24 January

== Execution ==
After two reprieves, during which the King and Privy Council examined Ireland's alibi at great length, Ireland and Grove were executed together at Tyburn, Grove saying: "We are innocent, we lose our lives wrongfully, we pray God to forgive them that are the causes of it." The King, who had already stated privately that they were innocent, as a special act of clemency ordered that they be allowed to hang until they were dead, thus sparing them the usual horrors of drawing and quartering.

== Aftermath ==
A deposition against Ireland's alibi was subsequently published by Robert Jenison, (brother of the Jesuit Thomas Jenison, who died in prison as a result of his brother's testimony) and further charges were brought against Ireland in John Smith's Narrative containing a further Discovery of the Popish Plot of 1679. On the other hand, Oates's false evidence against Ireland was later considered to be of such importance as to form a separate indictment at his trial for perjury in 1685. This unusual step may reflect the strongly expressed private view of King Charles II (who died a few days before the trial started) that Ireland was innocent. The Crown may well have had an uneasy conscience about the decision to reject Ireland's cast-iron alibi, which had troubled them enough to have it debated twice before the Privy Council, and which was conclusive at Oates's trial, when he failed to produce his crucial countervailing witness, the elusive servant girl Sarah Paine.
