= John Fenwick (Jesuit) =

English Roman Catholic priest and martyr

Blessed John Fenwick SJ
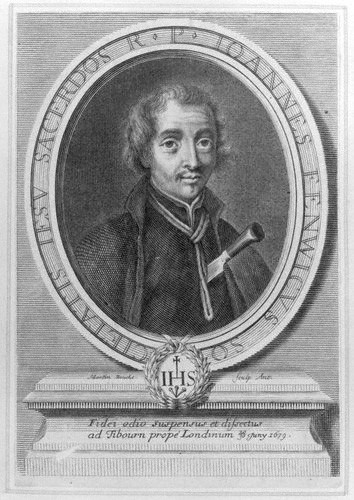
- Engraving of John Fenwick by Martin Bouche, 1683, National Portrait Gallery

Martyr
- Born: c.1628 Durham, England
- Died: 20 June 1679 (aged 50–51); Tyburn, London, England
- Honored in: Roman Catholic Church
- Beatified: 15 December 1929, Rome by Pope Pius XI
- Feast: 20 June

John Fenwick (1628 – 20 June 1679), real surname Caldwell, was an English Jesuit, executed at the time of the fabricated Popish Plot. He is a Catholic martyr, beatified in 1929 by Pope Pius XI.

== Life ==
He was born in county Durham, of Protestant parents belonged to the established religion (Anglican) who disowned him when he became a Roman Catholic convert. He took his course in humanities at the College of St. Omer, was sent to Liège to study theology, and entered the Society of Jesus at Watten on 28 September 1660. Having completed his studies, he was ordained a priest, and spent several years, from 1662, as procurator or agent at the College of St. Omer. He was made a professed father in 1676, and was sent to England the same year.

== Popish Plot ==
He resided in London as procurator of St. Omer's College, and was also one of the missionary fathers there. In 1678, on the information of Titus Oates, he was summoned to appear before the Privy Council, and committed to Newgate Prison. He was put in chains and suffered great pain as a result: one of his legs became so infected that amputation was proposed. His correspondence was seized, but to the Crown's disappointment it turned out to be completely innocuous: as he forcefully pointed out at his second trial, among at least a thousand letters taken from him there was not one which could be construed as treasonable. He was tried for high treason with William Ireland, in that they had conspired to kill King Charles II, a charge fabricated by Oates and later embellished by other informers. Oates claimed that he had overheard some incriminating remarks they made at a meeting of senior Jesuits in late April 1678 in the White Horse Tavern on the Strand: they could truthfully deny this, although they had at the time been at a meeting of senior Jesuits in the Palace of Whitehall. As the evidence of treason was insufficient, since the Crown lacked the requisite two witnesses, he was remanded back to prison.

However, in the political climate of the time, it was unthinkable that so prominent a Jesuit should be allowed to escape with his life: accordingly, he was arraigned a second time at the Old Bailey on 13 June 1679, before all the High Court judges. He was tried together with four other Jesuit fathers (John Gavan, William Harcourt, Thomas Whitebread and Anthony Turner}. Oates and two other notorious informers, William Bedloe and Stephen Dugdale, were the main witnesses against them, and in accordance with the direction of Lord Chief Justice William Scroggs, the jury found the prisoners guilty, despite their spirited defence. At the end of the prosecution case Fenwick made a vigorous protest:

"I have had a thousand letters taken from me: not any of these letters had anything of treason in them. All the evidence comes but to this: there is but saying and swearing."

== Execution ==
The five Jesuits suffered death at Tyburn on 20 June 1679. As an act of clemency, the King, who was well aware that they were innocent, but realised that it would be politically unthinkable to grant a royal pardon or reprieve, ordered that they be allowed to hang until they were dead, and be spared the indignity of drawing and quartering. In a sign that public sympathy was turning against the plot, the large crowd heard their final speeches from the scaffold in respectful silence, as each maintained his innocence. Fenwick's remains were buried in the churchyard of St. Giles-in-the-Fields.

An account of the trial and condemnation of the five Jesuits for High Treason, in conspiring the Death of the King, the Subversion of the Government and Protestant Religion was published by authority at London, 1679.
