= Stephen Dugdale =

Stephen Dugdale (1640?-1683) was an English informer, and self-proclaimed discoverer of parts of the Popish Plot (which was in reality the fabrication of his fellow informer Titus Oates). He perjured himself on numerous occasions, giving false testimony which led to the conviction and execution of numerous innocent men, notably the Catholic nobleman Lord Stafford, the Jesuit Provincial Thomas Whitbread, and the prominent barrister Richard Langhorne.

== Life ==
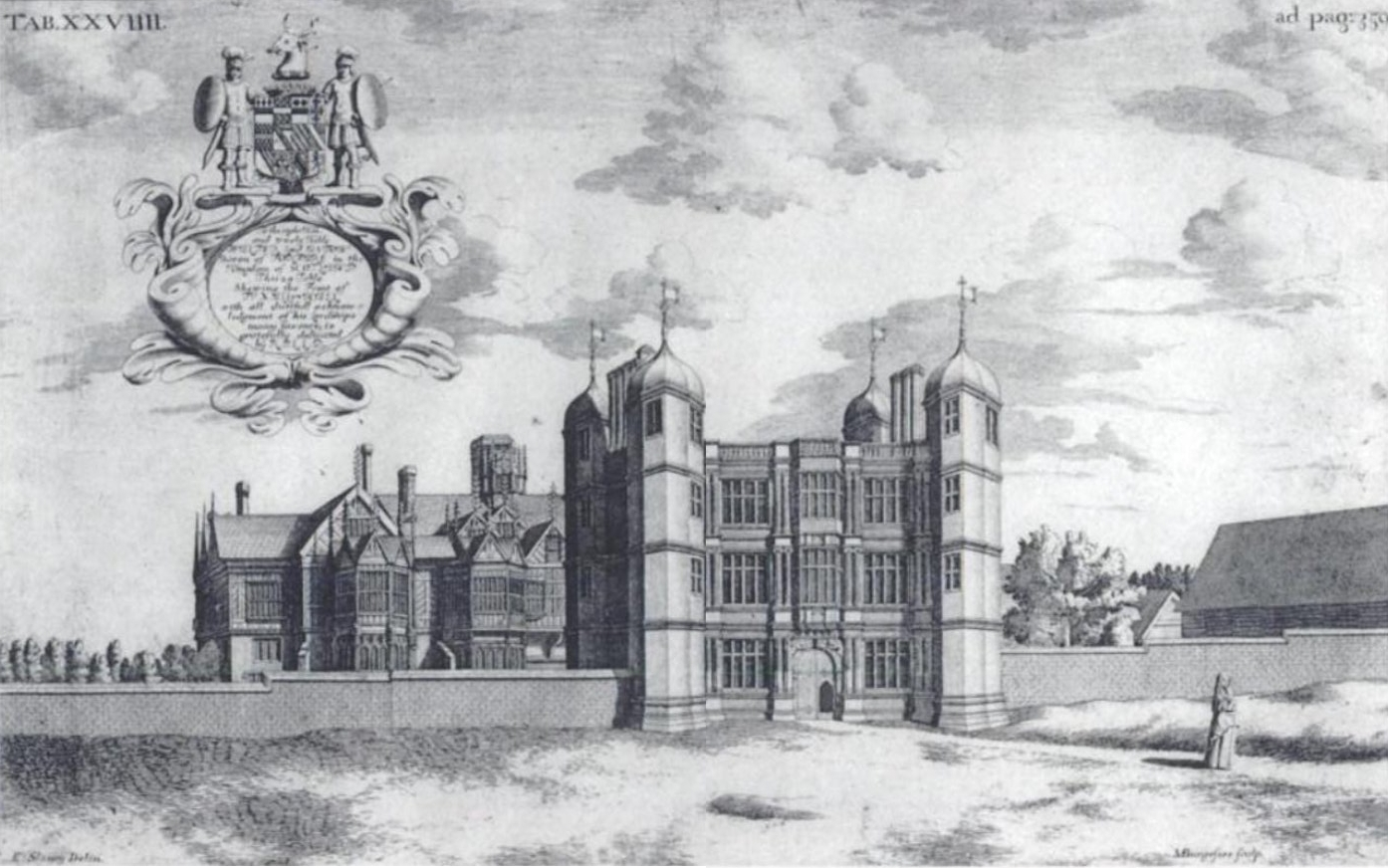
Tixall House and Gatehouse (c. 1686) by R. Plot. Tixall was the family seat of the Lords Aston of Forfar, Dugdale's employers

Dugdale's early life is obscure, but he was probably a native of Staffordshire, and is said to have belonged to a family of minor gentry, although little is known about his parents. The favourable impression he made on the authorities during the Plot indicates that he was well educated and of good social standing. He became a Roman Catholic convert in 1657 or 1658 (being at that date about eighteen years of age). About the same time, he met Francis Evers (or Eure), a leading Jesuit, in Staffordshire: Evers later figured in his fabricated story as one of the masterminds of the Popish Plot, although he was never caught.

In 1677 Dugdale was steward to the wealthy Catholic nobleman Walter Aston, 2nd Lord Aston of Forfar, at his principal residence Tixall, Staffordshire, where Dugdale cheated the workmen of their wages. In July or August, according to Dugdale, letters arrived at Tixall connected with the Popish Plot, in which the Jesuits and several Catholic lords were said to be deeply implicated. Dugdale claimed that meetings between the conspirators at Tixall followed in August and September 1678, and that the murder of Sir Edmund Berry Godfrey was discussed. By September Dugdale found himself about to be dismissed for embezzlement (he had stolen money to cover his gambling debts) and general misconduct by Walter Aston, 3rd Lord Aston of Forfar, who had just succeeded to his father's title. Dugdale turned on his employer, who in the prevailing public mood was extremely vulnerable to false charges of treason, as the Aston family were not only open Roman Catholics but the effective leaders of the Staffordshire Catholic community. The elder Lord Aston had been accused of recusancy in 1675, though the charges against him were quickly dropped.

== Popish Plot ==
Dugdale gave evidence before the justices of the peace, who issued warrants for the apprehension of George Hobson and George North. Although he professed to have broken open letters from Paris to Evers and others, he had little but hearsay evidence, and pretended to have destroyed the most dangerous documents on the eve of his departure. His evidence was further weakened by the inability of the authorities to find Francis Evers, who remained free throughout the Plot. He gave evidence against the "five popish lords" (Lord Stafford, Earl of Powis, Lord Arundell of Wardour, Lord Belasyse and Lord Petre) in October 1678. On 24 December 1678, he swore information before two magistrates, Thomas Lane and J. Vernon in Staffordshire. His initial reception by the Government was extremely favourable: he was "a man of sense and temper", intelligent, educated and well-spoken, in marked contrast to the disreputable earlier informers like Titus Oates. His testimony, in the early stages, was so plausible that even Charles II, who had previously been a complete sceptic on the subject, "began to think there was somewhat in the Plot"; while Chief Justice William Scroggs found him entirely convincing, as did many others, for "somewhat in his air disposed people to believe him". By the time his unsavoury past came to light, he had done a great deal of harm. Despite his deep grievance against Lord Aston he seemed at first rather hesitant about accusing him of complicity in the Plot, but eventually did so: Aston was accordingly sent to the Tower of London.

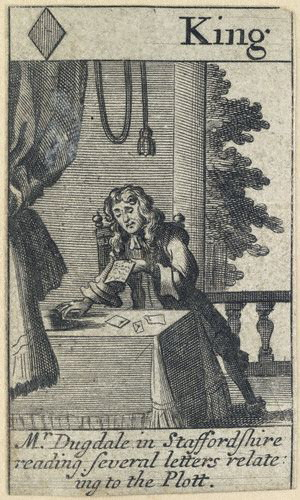
Playing card of 1679 showing Stephen Dugdale, engraving after Francis Barlow.

Dugdale charged John Tasborough and Mrs. Ann Price with soliciting him to sign a paper of recantation of his evidence, and offering him a £1,000 reward for it. In February 1679 these persons were tried and convicted at the king's bench; Price had been Dugdale's fellow-servant and sweetheart at Tixall. Afterwards, Dugdale led a shifty, vagabond life, giving evidence and writing pamphlets, at first associating chiefly with William Bedloe, Oates, and Edward Turberville, but eventually turning against Stephen College and confronting Oates.

== The Plot Trials ==
At the trial of the five Jesuits (Thomas Whitebread, William Barrow alias Harcourt, John Fenwick, John Gavan, and Anthony Turner, from 13 June 1679) Dugdale charged two of them with consulting to bring about the assassination of Charles II. He charged Whitebread with writing a letter providing for the entertainment of 'good stout fellows,' namely the four Irish 'ruffians' who were reported to have been hired for the regicide. The next day, 14 June, at the trial of the barrister Richard Langhorn, Dugdale was a chief witness for the prosecution. All six men were found guilty and executed, although they were spared the usual horrors of a traitor's death: the King (who was convinced of their innocence) as an act of clemency ordered that they not be hung drawn and quartered, but allowed to hang until they were dead.

At the trial of Sir George Wakeman, from 18 July, Dugdale gave evidence against the accused; but he was already falling into discredit (his claim that all Protestants in England were to be massacred if the Plot succeeded was too much even for Lord Chief Justice Scroggs to swallow) and an acquittal followed.

He swore, on the second day of Lord Stafford's trial, 1 December 1680, that the accused had been present at the "consults" at Tixall in September 1678, and also at Abnett's house in Stafford, where there had been talk about slaying the king, and that on the 20th or 21st Stafford offered him £500 to commit the crime. The prolonged dispute at the trial was chiefly concerning dates. But it came to light that Dugdale had tried to bribe other persons to give false evidence against Stafford and other persons. Nonetheless the evidence of Dugdale, Oates and Turberville was sufficient to secure the conviction and death of Stafford, who was beheaded on 29 December 1680.

As the public gradually became more sceptical about the reality of the plot, Lord Aston, who had accidentally launched Dugdale's career as an informer by dismissing him, was able to gain his freedom on bail. Aston never returned to prison, and never stood trial.

== After the Plot ==
Dugdale was understood to be willing to appear as a witness against the Whig leader Shaftesbury, who had undoubtedly used the Plot for his own political ends, and was seen by the King as his principal opponent. As a first step in bringing down Shaftesbury, Dugdale gave evidence against his fellow informer Stephen College at the Old Bailey, when a verdict of Ignoramus (i.e. we find no case against the accused) was returned by the grand jury, 8 July 1681. At the later trial at Oxford of College (the Crown having simply ignored the grand jury's finding that he had no case to answer), Dugdale swore against him, but came into direct conflict with his old associates like Titus Oates. In October Dugdale vainly complained to the council of Dr. Richard Lower, who stated that he had treated him for an infamous disease, Dugdale having sworn at College's trial that his previous illness had been caused solely by the Catholics having tried to poison him. Lower and the apothecary proved the case, and the council dismissed the false witness "not to trouble them any more". Dugdale then caused a Captain Clinton to be apprehended, on 28 December 1681, for defaming him, but the council set Clinton at liberty on bail.

== Death ==
Dugdale died a day or two before 26 March 1683. Secretary of State Leoline Jenkins had a report that both Edward Turberville and Dugdale had taken to drink, and in their delirium tremens imagined spectres (in particular the ghost of Lord Stafford, who had warned Turberville that he would follow him to the grave within the year), and died miserably.
