= Thomas Whitbread =

English Jesuit and martyr (1618–1679)

Blessed Thomas Whitbread SJ
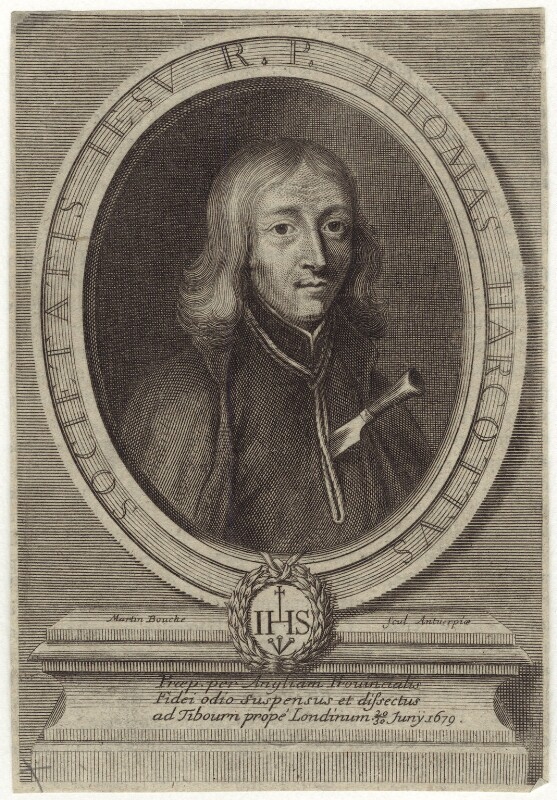
- Engraving of Thomas Whitbread (using his alias Harcourt) by Martin Bouché, 1683, National Portrait Gallery

Martyr
- Born: 1618; Essex, England
- Died: 20 June 1679 (aged 60–61); Tyburn, London
- Honored in: Roman Catholic Church
- Beatified: 15 December 1929 by Pope Pius XI
- Feast: 20 June

Thomas Whitbread (alias Harcourt) (1618–30 June 1679) was an English Jesuit missionary and martyr, wrongly convicted of conspiracy to murder Charles II of England and hanged during the Popish Plot. He was beatified in 1929 by Pope Pius XI and his feast day is celebrated on 20 June.

== Life ==
He was a native of Essex but little is known of his family or early life. He was educated at St. Omer's, and entered the novitiate of the Society of Jesus on 7 September 1635. Coming upon the English mission in 1647, he worked in England for more than thirty years, mostly in the eastern counties. On 8 December 1652, he was professed of the four vows. Twice he was superior of the Suffolk District, once of the Lincolnshire District, and finally, in 1678 he was declared Provincial. In this capacity he refused to admit Titus Oates as a member of the Society, on the grounds of his ignorance, blasphemy and sexual attraction to young boys, and expelled him forthwith from the seminary of St Omer; shortly afterwards Titus, motivated by personal spite against Whitbread, and against the Jesuits generally, fabricated the so-called "Popish Plot".

Whitbread preached a celebrated sermon at Liège, in July 1678, on the text "Can ye drink of the cup that I drink of?", in which he warned his listeners that the present time of tranquillity would not last, and that they must be willing to suffer false accusations, imprisonment, torture and martyrdom". Having completed a tour of his Flanders province, he went to England but at once fell ill with plague.

== Arrest, trial and execution ==
Whitbread was arrested in London on Michaelmas Day (i.e., 29 September) 1678, but was so ill that he could not be moved to Newgate until three months later. The house in which he and his secretary Edward Mico (who died in Newgate shortly afterwards) had been lodging was part of the Spanish Embassy in Wild Street, but for whatever reason, there was no claim of diplomatic immunity, as there was in the case of some other priests. He was first indicted at the Old Bailey, on 17 December 1678, but the evidence against him and his companions broke down. Oates testified that he had overheard Whitbread and other senior Jesuits plotting to kill the King in late April 1678 in the White Horse Tavern in the Strand. This was probably garbled second-hand information about an actual Jesuit meeting which was then going on at Whitehall Palace: but no one corroborated Oates' story, and Whitbread could in good conscience deny the assassination plot, and that he had ever been in the White Horse Tavern.

Given the state of public opinion, it was unthinkable to the Government that Whitbread, whom Oates and the other informers had identified as one of the originators of the Plot, should be allowed to escape punishment. Accordingly he was remanded and kept in prison until 13 June 1679, when he was again indicted for treason, and with four others was found guilty on the perjured evidence of Oates, William Bedloe and Stephen Dugdale. The importance of the trial is shown by the fact that it was heard by a bench of seven judges, headed by the Lord Chief Justice, Sir William Scroggs, who was a firm believer in the Plot and deeply hostile to Catholic priests. In the circumstances Whitbread could not have hoped to escape, and, although he strongly maintained his innocence, Kenyon suggests that he had resigned himself to death. Certainly the sermon he had preached at Liège the previous year suggests that he expected to suffer the death of a martyr, sooner or later.

He was sentenced to be hanged, drawn and quartered at Tyburn. The King, who knew that he and his fellow victims were innocent, ordered that they be allowed to die before being mutilated. The well-known story that they were offered a pardon on the scaffold if they would confess seems to have no substance. The crowd showed that on this occasion its sympathies were with the victims, and it listened in respectful silence as Whitbread and the others made lengthy speeches protesting their innocence. The others executed with him were John Gavan, John Fenwick, William Harcourt and Anthony Turner. After the execution, his remains, and those of his companions, were buried in St. Giles's in the Fields.

== Works ==
Whitbread wrote Devout Elevation of the Soul to God and two short poems, To Death and To His Soul, which are printed in The Remonstrance of Piety and Innocence.

Catholic Church titles
Preceded by Richard Strange	Provincial superior of the English; Province of the Society of Jesus; 14 January 1678 – 30 June 1679	Succeeded by John Warner
