= John Gavan =

English Jesuit

Blessed John Gavan SJ
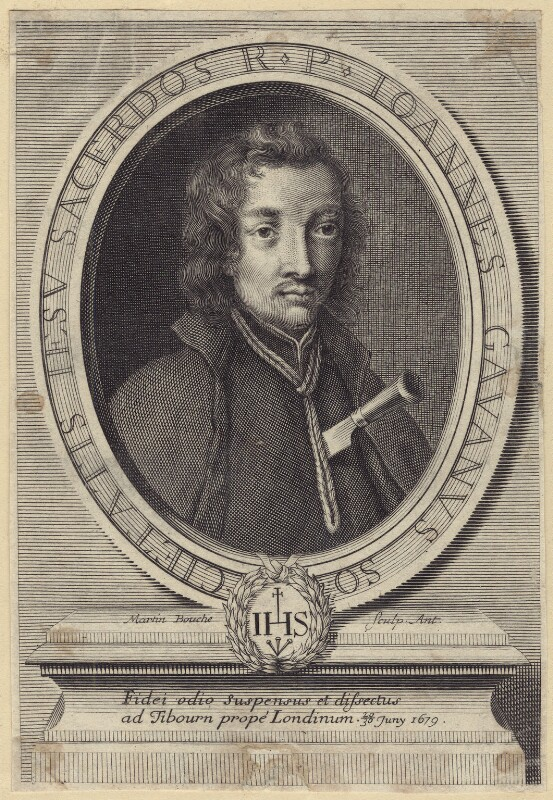
- Engraving of John Gavan, SJ by Martin Bouche in the National Portrait Gallery

Martyr
- Born: c.1640 London, England
- Died: 20 June 1679 (aged 38–39); Tyburn, London, England
- Honored in: Roman Catholic Church
- Beatified: 15 December 1929, Rome by Pope Pius XI
- Feast: 20 June

John Gavan (1640–20 June 1679) was an English Jesuit. He was a victim of the fabricated Popish Plot, and was wrongfully executed for conspiracy to murder King Charles II. He was beatified in 1929 by Pope Pius XI.

== Life ==
He was born in London in 1640, to a family which originally came from Norrington in Wiltshire: he was probably descended from John Gawen MP (died 1418), who built Norrington Manor in the 1370s. However, according to 17th-century heraldic pedigree records, he was noted as belonging to the Jevon family of Sedgley, Staffordshire. He was educated at the Jesuit College at St. Omer's and then at Liège and Watten. He began his priestly office in 1670 in Staffordshire, a county which was one of the strongholds of the Roman Catholic faith in England. He had an affectionate nickname "the Angel".

On the Feast of the Assumption, 15 August 1678, he took his final vows to the Society of Jesus at Boscobel House, the home of the Penderel family, who were famous for sheltering Charles II after he fled from his defeat at the Battle of Worcester in 1651. Among the witnesses were two other martyrs of the Popish Plot, William Ireland and Richard Gerard of Hilderstone. The ceremony was followed by dinner, and the guests then viewed the Royal Oak, the tree in which the King had hidden after fleeing from Worcester.

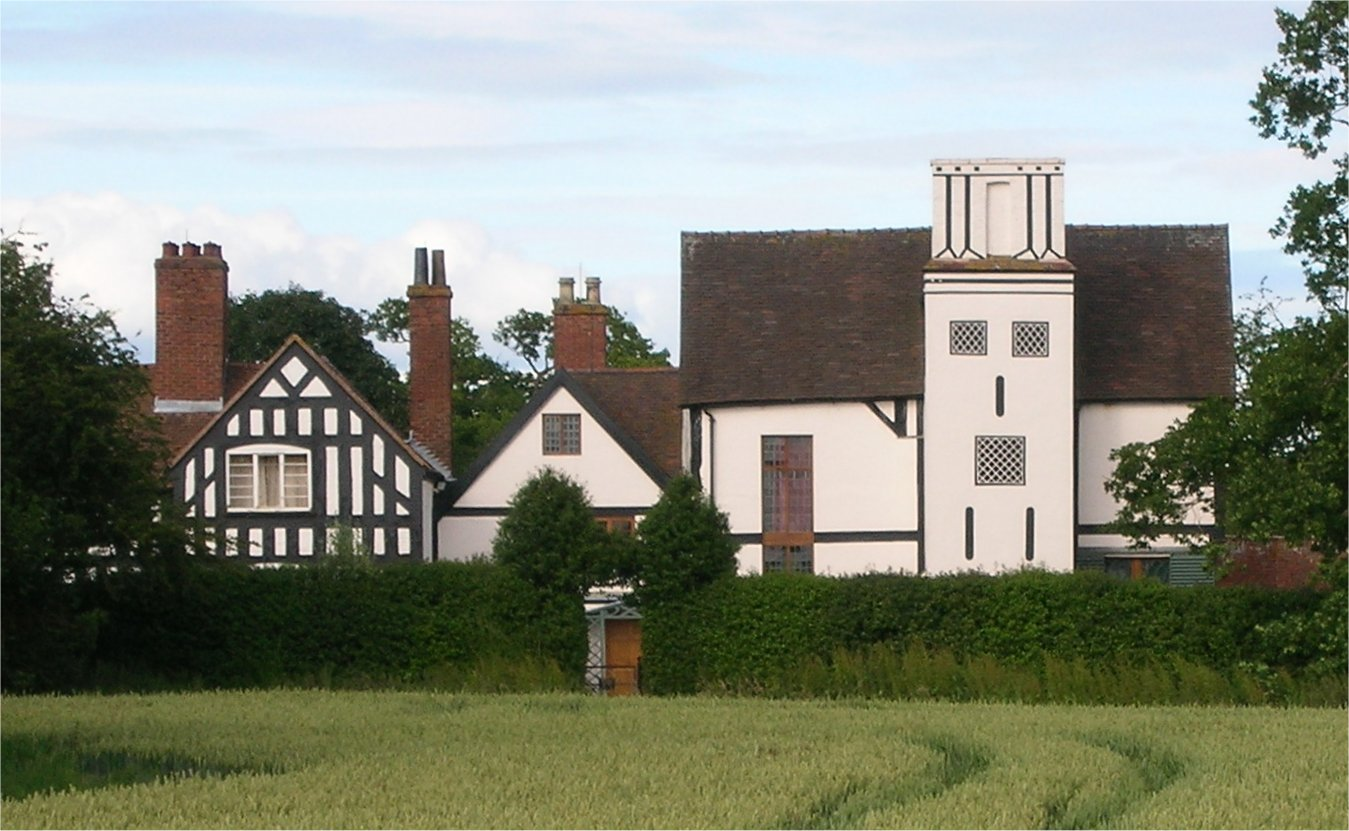
Boscobel House - Gavan's presence here in August 1678 would later have fatal consequences.

This celebration would have fatal consequences for Gavan (and also for two others who were present, William Ireland and Richard Gerard) during the Popish Plot, when Stephen Dugdale, one of the principal informers associated with the Plot, learned of it and accused the party of having gathered at Boscobel in order to plan a conspiracy to kill the King. Until January 1679, Gavan escaped arrest because Titus Oates, who had invented the plot about a month after Gavan took his vows, did not know him. On receiving Dugdale's testimony the Government issued a reward for Gavan's arrest on 15 January.

Gavan fled to London and took refuge at the Imperial Embassy. Arrangements were made to smuggle him out of England; but a spy called Schibber denounced him and he was arrested on 29 January. The ambassador did not claim diplomatic immunity for Gavan, although the embassies of the Catholic powers, taking their lead from the Spanish ambassador, did claim immunity for other priests, including George Travers. The reason for the ambassador surrendering Gavan was apparently that he was arrested in the Embassy stables, and was thus technically outside the precincts of the embassy itself when he was taken.

== Trial and execution ==
Gavan was tried on 13 June 1679 with Thomas Whitbread, John Fenwick, William Barrow and Anthony Turner. A bench of seven judges tried them, headed by the Lord Chief Justice, Sir William Scroggs, a firm believer in the Plot, and deeply hostile to Catholic priests in general. Gavan, who acted as the spokesman for all the five accused, mounted a spirited defence, which led a modern historian to call him one of the ablest priests of his generation. Attempts by Roman Catholic witnesses to prove that Titus Oates had been at St Omer's on crucial dates when he claimed to be in London failed, as the judges gave a ruling that Catholic witnesses could receive a papal dispensation to lie on oath, and were, therefore, less credible than Protestants. Gavan had far greater success exposing the inconsistencies in Oates' own testimony: in particular, Oates could not explain why he had not denounced Gavan in September 1678 when he first made his accusations against Whitbread and Fenwick. Gavan concluded his defence with a long and eloquent plea of innocence, despite constant interruption from Scroggs.

Scroggs, in his summing-up to the jury, admitted that he has already forgotten much of the evidence (judges then did not take notes, apparently because they had no desks to write on) but made it clear to the jury that he expected a guilty verdict, which the jury duly brought in after fifteen minutes. The five were sentenced to death the next day.

They were hanged at Tyburn on 20 June 1679. The behaviour of the crowd suggests strongly that public opinion was turning in favour of the victims. According to witnesses, the onlookers stood in perfect silence for at least an hour while each of the condemned men made a last speech maintaining his innocence; finally, Gavan led all five condemned men in an act of contrition. His own last words were reported to have been "I am content to undergo an ignominious death for the love of you, dear Jesus". As an act of clemency, King Charles II (who was convinced of their innocence, but believed that he could not risk inflaming public opinion by issuing a royal pardon) gave orders that they should be allowed to hang until they were dead, and thus be spared the usual horrors of drawing and quartering. They were buried in the churchyard of St. Giles in the Fields.
