= William Barrow (Jesuit) =

English Jesuit and martyr

Blessed William Barrow SJ
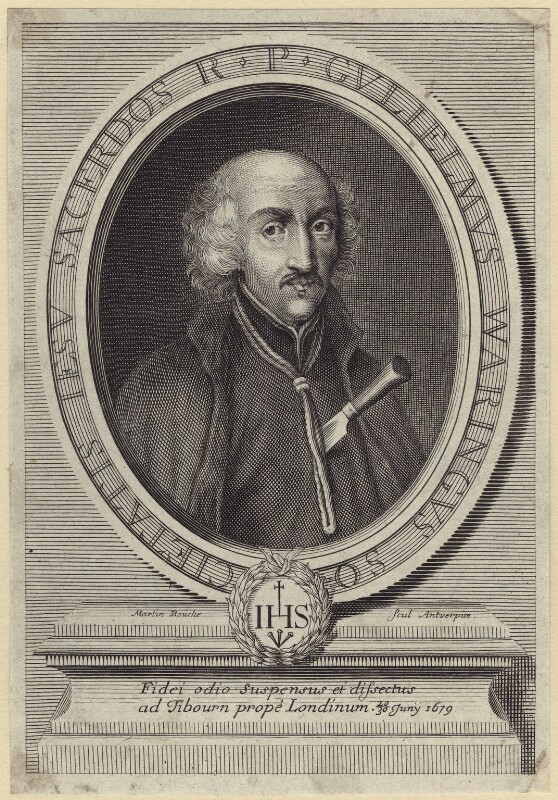
- Portrait of William Barrow, SJ by Cornelis van Merlen

Martyr
- Born: c. 1609; Lancashire, England
- Died: 20 June 1679 (aged 69 - 70); Tyburn, London, England
- Honored in: Roman Catholicism
- Beatified: 15 December 1929 by Pope Pius XI
- Feast: 20 June

William Barrow (alias Waring, alias Harcourt) (1609 – 30 June 1679) was an English Jesuit, executed as a result of the fictitious so-called Popish Plot, that between 1678 and 1681 gripped the Kingdoms of England and Scotland in anti-Catholic hysteria. Barrow is regarded as a martyr of the Roman Catholic church and was beatified in 1929.

== Life ==
Barrow was born in Lancashire. He made his studies at the Jesuit College, St. Omer's, and entered the Society of Jesus at Watten in 1632. He was sent to the English mission in 1644 and worked in the London district for thirty-five years, becoming, at the beginning of 1678, its superior.

At the outbreak of the Plot, Barrow was one of the most sought-after of the alleged plotters, although his use of the alias Harcourt caused the Government great confusion, as several other Jesuits also used it. He went into hiding in London, and for several months eluded capture. Finally, in May 1679, he was arrested and committed to Newgate on the charge of complicity in the plot brought against him by Titus Oates. The trial, in which he had as fellow-prisoners his colleagues, Thomas Whitebread, John Fenwick, John Gavan, and Anthony Turner, commenced on 13 June 1679.

Lord Chief Justice Scroggs presided, assisted by no less than six junior judges. Oates, William Bedloe, and Stephen Dugdale were the principal witnesses for the Crown. The prisoners were charged with having conspired to kill King Charles II and subvert the Protestant religion. They defended themselves by the testimony of their own witnesses and their cross-examinations of their accusers. Oates' claim that he had heard some of them plotting treason in the White Horse Tavern in London in late April 1678 was something they could in could conscience deny, although they did not feel obliged to mention that they had been at a meeting of the Jesuit chapter in Whitehall Palace at the time. John Gavan, the youngest and ablest of the five, bore the main burden of conducting his colleagues' defence as well as his own.

Scroggs in directing the jury laid down two crucial legal principles-

- as the witnesses for the prosecution had recently received the royal pardon, none of their undeniable previous misdemeanours could be legally admitted as impairing the value of their testimony; and
- that no Catholic witness was to be believed, as it was to be assumed that he had received a dispensation to lie.

Barrow and the others were found guilty, and condemned to undergo the punishment for high treason. They were executed together at Tyburn, 20 June 1679. The King, who was well aware that they were innocent, ordered as an act of grace that they be spared drawing and quartering, and given proper burial. The behaviour of the crowd, which listened in respectful silence as each man maintained his innocence, suggests that popular opinion was turning against the Plot. They were buried in St Giles in the Fields.

== Beatification ==
By a papal decree of 4 December 1886, this martyr's cause was introduced, but under the name of "William Harcourt". This is the official name of beatification.
