= Anthony Turner (martyr) =

English Roman Catholic priest and martyr

Blessed Anthony Turner SJ
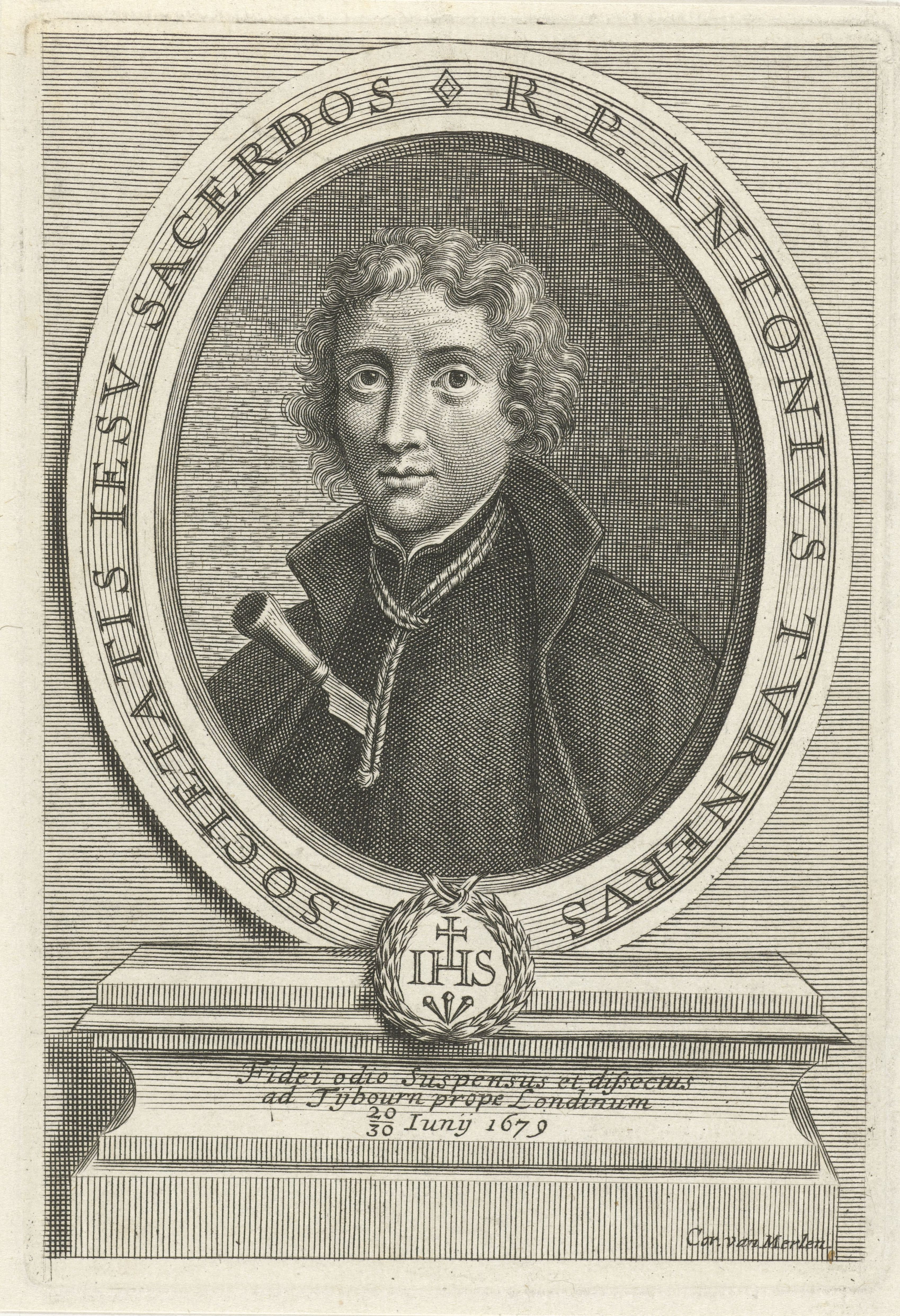
- Portrait of Anthony Turner, S.J. by Cornelis van Merlen

Martyr
- Born: 1628; Melton Mowbray, Leicestershire, England
- Died: 20 June 1679 (aged 50–51); Tyburn, London, England
- Honored in: Roman Catholic Church
- Beatified: 15 December 1929 by Pope Pius XI
- Feast: 20 June

Anthony Turner (1628–20 June 1679) was an English Jesuit priest and martyr. He was a victim of the Popish Plot, and was falsely convicted and executed for conspiracy to murder Charles II. He was beatified in 1929 by Pope Pius XI and his feast day is 20 June.

== Life ==
He was born in Melton Mowbray, Leicestershire, the son of a clergyman, Toby Turner, who was Rector of Little Dalby and Elizabeth, nee Cheseldine. He went to Uppingham School in Rutland, then studied at Peterhouse, Cambridge, where, according to tradition, he converted to Roman Catholicism.

He went to the English College, Rome in October 1650 and then to the Jesuit College, St Omer. He was ordained there on 12 April 1659.

In 1661, he was sent to run the Jesuits' Worcestershire mission, and he remained there for the rest of his ministry; in due course, he was appointed Jesuit Superior for the District (1670-78).

== Trial and execution ==
At the outbreak of the Popish Plot, the Government showed exceptional interest in apprehending Turner. Why he was considered to be of such importance is unclear, but he must have been thought well worth catching, as pursuivants searched for him in three counties.

Turner resolved to suffer for the Church but was urged to flee England by his superiors. He journeyed to London in January 1679 to take refuge in the embassy of one of the Catholic powers and to find a Jesuit who could get him out of the country; his search was unsuccessful and he gave the last of his money to a beggar and turned himself in to the authorities in February 1679.

His motives for doing this are unclear: Jesuits, though were schooled to endure martyrdom where necessary, were not expected to actively seek it, nor does his spirited defence at his trial suggest that he had any such wish. It is most likely, as J. P. Kenyon suggests, that his physical and mental suffering had caused him to suffer a short-lived nervous breakdown.

Although Turner was not on Titus Oates' list, he was moved to Newgate Prison and tried on 13 June 1679 together with Thomas Whitbread, John Fenwick, John Gavan and William Barrow. No fewer than seven judges sat on the court that tried them, headed by the Lord Chief Justice, Sir William Scroggs, who was a convinced believer in the Plot and cherished a deep hatred of Catholic priests. Turner, having recovered his mental balance, defended himself with vigour, although the four older priests allowed the young and able John Gavan to act as the principal spokesman for all five. Attempts to discredit the testimony of Titus Oates, the inventor of the Plot, by proving that he had been in St Omer for six months when he claimed to have been in London failed, as the Court ruled that the witnesses, being Catholics, could receive a dispensation to lie and were therefore not credible. Far more effective were the direct attacks on Oates himself; in particular, the accused were able to show that though Oates knew Whitbread and Fenwick personally, Gavan was a stranger to him. Oates's evidence against Gavan was so feeble that even Scroggs remarked "I perceive your memory is not good".

Despite weaknesses in the prosecution case, Scroggs summed up firmly for a conviction (while cheerfully admitting that he had already forgotten most of the evidence), and the jury delivered a guilty verdict within fifteen minutes. All five were hanged at Tyburn on 20 June 1679. The well-known story that they were offered a royal pardon on the scaffold if they would confess seems to have no foundation. Charles II was asked to show clemency, but refused, for fear of inflaming public opinion; the most he would do is order that the five be allowed to hang until they were dead, that they be spared drawing and quartering and given a proper burial.

The crowd showed that its sympathy was with the victims, and stood in respectful silence while each of the condemned men delivered a last speech maintaining his innocence. They were buried in St Giles-in-the-Fields.
