= Richard Langhorne =

English barrister and Catholic martyr

Blessed Richard Langhorne

Martyr
- Born: c. 1624; Little Wymondley, Hertfordshire, England
- Died: 14 July 1679 (aged 54–55); Tyburn, London, England
- Honored in: Roman Catholic Church
- Beatified: 15 December 1929 by Pope Pius XI
- Feast: 14 July

Richard Langhorne (c. 1624 – 14 July 1679) was an English barrister and Catholic martyr, who was executed on a false charge of treason as part of the fabricated Popish Plot. He fell under suspicion because he was a Roman Catholic and because he had acted as legal adviser to the Jesuits at a time of acute anti-Catholic hysteria.

== Background and early life ==
He was the third son of William Langhorne, a barrister, and his wife Lettice Needham, of Little Wymondley in Hertfordshire. He was admitted to the Inner Temple in May 1647 and called to the bar in November 1654. He was a Roman Catholic, and provided legal and financial advice for the Jesuits. During the wave of anti-Catholic hysteria which followed the Great Fire of London of 1666, he was briefly arrested but quickly released.

His wife, Dorothy Legatt, was a Protestant from Havering in Essex. His sons Charles and Francis were both priests. When, in October 1677, Titus Oates was expelled from the English College at St Omer "for serious moral lapses", Charles Langhorne entrusted Oates with a letter to his father. Oates returned to St Omer with a letter from Richard thanking the Jesuits for all they had done for his sons.

== Arrest ==
When Oates and Israel Tonge unleashed their entirely fictitious Popish Plot, a non-existent Catholic conspiracy to kill King Charles II, in September 1678, three Jesuits and a Benedictine were arrested. Following a detailed search of their papers (which failed to uncover any evidence of treason), Langhorne's role as legal adviser to the Jesuits was discovered almost at once: he was arrested a week after the four priests, although there was no evidence in the priests' papers that he had committed any crime. He was imprisoned at Newgate and charged with treason. Oates claimed, and was corroborated by the notorious informer and confidence trickster William Bedloe, that Langhorne's earlier correspondence dealt with the conspiracy to kill the King.

== Trial and execution ==
He was tried on 14 June 1679. He was forced to defend himself, as a person charged with treason had no right then to defence counsel (this rule was not changed until the passage of the Treason Act 1695). His main defence consisted of an attack on the character of the Crown's principal witnesses, Oates and Bedloe, but since the judges were well aware of the deplorable past lives of both men, this seems to have made little impression. He also called a number of students from St Omer to prove that Oates had been at the college on the crucial dates when he claimed to be in London, but the public mood was so hostile to Catholics that the witnesses were barely able to make themselves heard over the roar of the crowd, and some of them were assaulted as they left the Court. Ironically, some of the same witnesses appeared for the prosecution at Oates' own trial for perjury in 1685, where the crowd treated them courteously, and the jury was told to weigh their evidence with the greatest seriousness.

William Scroggs, the Lord Chief Justice, although violently prejudiced against Catholic priests, was relatively tolerant of Catholic laymen; his summing up was reasonably fair by the standards of the time, and he did warn the jury that on no account should an innocent man's life be taken away. Nonetheless, Langhorne was found guilty of High Treason.

As the result of a petition by his wife, a ‘true Protestant’, he received a month's reprieve to tidy the affairs of his clients. Kenyon suggests that the Crown was still hoping that he would confess, and it seems that he was offered a royal pardon if he did so. Langhorne was prepared, presumably with the consent of the Jesuit fathers, to give the Crown a list of all the Jesuit properties in England, (which turned out to be much less extensive than the Crown, misled by Oates's wild exaggeration of the Jesuits' wealth, had expected) but he steadily maintained his innocence. He also wrote a lengthy religious meditation in verse, which was later published. He was executed at Tyburn, London, on 14 July 1679. Public opinion was slowly turning against the Plot, and Langhorne's courageous death made a favourable impression on the watching crowd.

== Legacy ==
On 15 December 1929, he was beatified by Pope Pius XI. His feast day is 14 July, the day of his death.

There is a stained glass window of Langhorne in Our Lady of Lourdes in Harpenden, Hertfordshire.
