= Richard Strange (disambiguation) =

Richard Strange is an English writer, actor and musician.

Richard Strange may also refer to:

- Richard Strange (Jesuit) (1611–1683), English Jesuit
- Richard Strange (MP for Hereford) (fl. 1414–1421), Member of Parliament
- Richard Strange (MP for Horsham and King's Lynn) (by 1526 – ?)
