= Thomas Pickering (martyr) =

Blessed Thomas Pickering OSB
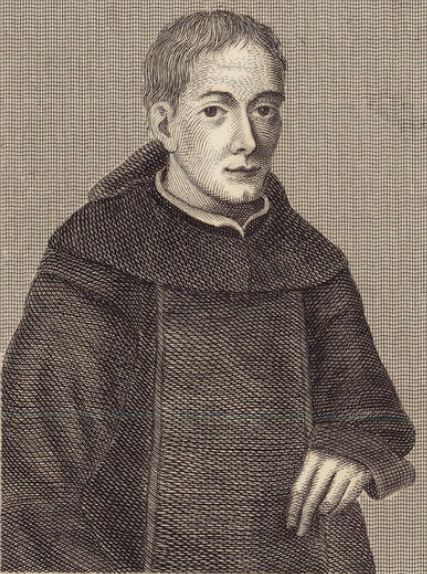

Martyr
- Born: c. 1621; Westmorland, England
- Died: 9 May 1679 (aged 57); Tyburn, London, England
- Venerated in: Roman Catholic Church
- Beatified: 15 December 1929 by Pope Pius XI
- Feast: 9 May

Thomas Pickering (c. 1621 – 9 May 1679) was a Benedictine lay brother who served in England during the time of recusancy in the late seventeenth century. He was martyred as a result of the fraudulent claims of Titus Oates that he was part of a plot to murder King Charles II.

== Life ==
Pickering was born in 1621 in Skelsmergh, near Kendal, Cumbria. His father died fighting for Charles I of England during the Civil War He entered the Benedictine Priory of St. Gregory the Great at Douai and made his vows as in 1660.

In 1665, he was sent to London to be steward for the Benedictine monks who served the chapel of Catherine of Braganza, the Catholic wife of King Charles II, first at St James's Palace, and from 1671 at Somerset House on the Strand. He became known personally to the Queen and Charles II; and when in 1675, urged by the Parliament, Charles issued a proclamation ordering the Benedictines to leave England within a fixed time, Pickering was allowed to remain, probably on the grounds that he was not a Catholic priest.

== Popish Plot ==
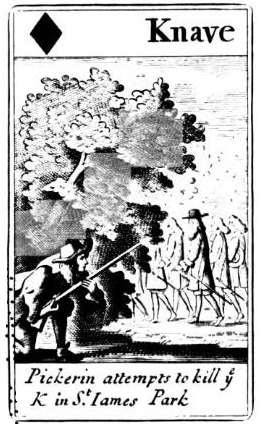
One of a set of playing cards depicting the Popish Plot by Francis Barlow, showing Pickering who allegedly attempted to kill the King in St. James Park

In 1678, Titus Oates made false claims of a Catholic plot against the King's life, and Pickering was accused of being part of this conspiracy, which is popularly known as the Popish Plot. At his trial on 17 December 1678, no evidence of treason against Pickering except Oates's mere word was produced, and Pickering's housekeeper, the formidable Ellen Rigby, later testified that Oates had only seen Pickering once in his life, when he had been begging for alms at the Benedictine's London house in the summer of 1678. She also testified that he had a personal grudge against Pickering, who, despite his habitual charity and good temper, told her not to admit him again.

Pickering's innocence was so obvious that the Queen publicly announced her belief in him. Nonetheless, the jury, under heavy pressure from William Scroggs, the Lord Chief Justice, who was a convinced believer in the Popish Plot, found him guilty, and with William Ireland and John Grove he was condemned to be hanged, drawn, and quartered.

== Execution ==
The King, who himself had Catholic leanings, was torn between his reluctance to execute three men whom he knew to be innocent (Ireland's innocence was even more obvious than Pickering's since he had a cast-iron alibi, which the prosecution never succeeded in breaking), and his fear of the popular clamour, as the public loudly demanded the death of Oates's victims. Twice within a month, the three prisoners were ordered to prepare for execution and then reprieved.

At length Charles, although only with great reluctance, ordered the execution of Ireland and Grove, hoping that this would satisfy public opinion and save Pickering from his fate. However, on 26 April 1679, the House of Commons petitioned for Pickering's execution. Charles yielded, and on 9 May 1679, Pickering was hanged, drawn and quartered at Tyburn with Ambrose Mac-Fall, George Terpitsas and the Benedictine George Gervase. Pickering was buried in St Giles in the Fields churchyard.

Pickering was one of the 107 martyrs beatified by Pope Pius XI on 15 December 1929. A man of true simplicity and innocence of life, he was described as the most charitable and sweet-tempered of men.

== Roman Martyrology ==
"In London, in 1679, Blessed Thomas Pickering, Benedictine monk and martyr. A man of true simplicity and innocence of life, he was falsely accused of plotting against King Charles II, and with a quiet heart went to the gallows at Tyburn."

== Sources ==
- Bede Camm (1931) Nine Martyr Monks, pp. 344–348.
- Kenyon, J. P. The Popish Plot, Phoenix Press reissue 2000
