= Edward Colman (martyr) =

English Catholic courtier and martyr

Blessed Edward Coleman
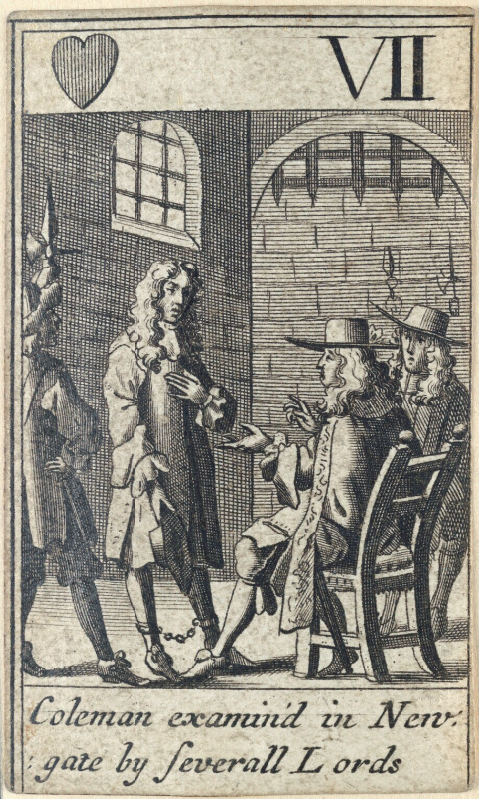
- "Coleman examined in Newgate by several Lords". Popish Plot playing card drawn by Francis Barlow

Layman
- Born: 17 May 1636; Brent Eleigh, Suffolk
- Died: 3 December 1678 (aged 42); Tyburn, London, England
- Honored in: Roman Catholic Church
- Beatified: 15 December 1929 by Pope Pius XI
- Feast: 3 December

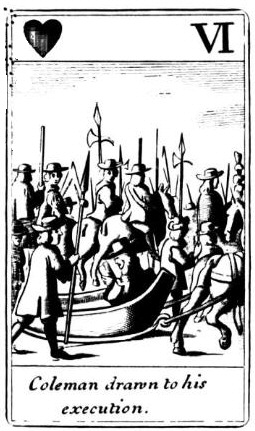
"Coleman drawn to his execution"; one of a set of playing cards depicting the Popish Plot by Francis Barlow, c. 1679

Edward Colman or Coleman (17 May 1636 – 3 December 1678) was an English Catholic courtier under Charles II of England. He was hanged, drawn and quartered on a treason charge, having been implicated by Titus Oates in his false accusations concerning a Popish Plot. He is a Catholic martyr, beatified by Pope Pius XI in 1929.

== Life ==
He was born at Brent Eleigh, Suffolk, son of the local vicar Thomas Colman and his wife Margaret Wilson; he was a cousin of the Salisbury MP, Richard Colman, who died in 1672, and through Richard's wife Anne Hyde a distant connection of Edward Hyde, 1st Earl of Clarendon. He attended Trinity College, Cambridge, receiving an MA in 1659. Colman, who had been reared as a strict Puritan, converted to Roman Catholicism in the early 1660s. He has been described as a man of considerable charm and ability, but lacking in common sense or political realism. Sir Robert Southwell, who knew him well, called him "a man who must run himself into the briars". He was married: his wife was known to be a woman of great charm, but little else seems to be recorded of her. In appearance he was strikingly pale and emaciated, due it was said to his practice of regular fasting; his white face being all the more noticeable because he always wore a black periwig.

== Career ==
In June 1661 he became a gentleman pensioner to Charles II. He was a charismatic advocate of the Catholic cause and is credited with several high-profile conversions, including possibly the future James II, although the details of that conversion are shrouded in mystery, due to the King's insistence on secrecy. It was more likely the Jesuit Emmanuel Lobb who received James into the Catholic Church. In 1673 James appointed Colman secretary to his wife, Mary of Modena, despite warnings from several quarters, including Charles II himself, that he was not a man to be trusted.

The passing of the Test Act in the same year, barring Catholics from public office, has been described as a shattering blow to his hopes of an important political career, and condemned him to a life of "backstairs intrigue", unless he could get the Act repealed. This explains his repeated efforts to obtain a dissolution of the Cavalier Parliament, although his belief that a new Parliament would be disposed to repeal the Test Act was shared by no one else. His intrigues were so ill-judged that they led to the Cavalier Parliament in its final session passing a second and more stringent Test Act, while the next Parliament, elected after Colman's death was, quite contrary to his predictions, even more hostile to Catholicism than its predecessor.

He visited Brussels in the hope of gaining support from the Papal nuncio there for a scheme for increased tolerance for English Catholics, but nothing came of it. He also visited Paris without an official pass, which was later used in evidence against him at his trial in 1678. Subsequently, he was in contact with highly placed Catholics in France. Through an English Catholic army officer stationed in Paris, Sir William Throckmorton, he passed on political information to the Jesuit Jean Ferrier who was confessor to Louis XIV. In 1675 he offered his services in favour of Catholicism to François de la Chaise, successor to Ferrier as royal confessor; in 1676 he was in communication with Father Saint-Germain, former confessor to Charles II's sister-in-law Mary of Modena, offering his assistance to prevent a rupture between England and France. These attempts failed to procure money, due mainly to the scepticism of Simon Arnauld, Marquis de Pomponne, Louis' Foreign Minister, who put no faith in Colman, Throckmorton or indeed King Charles II, whom he did not even think worth the trouble of bribing. Louis evidently shared this view: as Throckmorton admitted "he (Louis) hath so mean an opinion of King Charles and all his partners, he scarce thinks anything we do worth money". Colman succeeded later in obtaining £3500 from three successive French ambassadors, whom he supplied with information on the proceedings of Parliament.

Colman acted independently of Charles II in trying to obtain French financial assistance to reduce the King's dependence on the anti-Catholic Parliament. When money was eventually secured by Charles, it was not through any of Colman's efforts. Throckmorton had been killed in a duel in the spring of 1675: this, following Ferrier's death the previous winter, deprived Colman of his most useful contacts at the French Court. He was still in touch with Father Saint-Germain, but this connection did him nothing but harm, as Saint-Germain, who had been forced to flee from England after allegedly threatening the life of a former Catholic priest called de Luzancy, was regarded as even more unstable and fanatical than Colman himself.

Lord High Treasurer Thomas Osborne, Earl of Danby viewed Colman as a dangerous influence on James, a view shared by the King. Danby had him dismissed in 1676 after Colman was caught leaking naval intelligence in a newsletter; according to both to the Dictionary of National Biography and recent research, the dismissal was at the prompting of the Bishop of London, Henry Compton, although Antonia Fraser notes that the King himself had on several occasions urged his brother to dismiss him. Edward continued with unofficial duties for James and he may have disbursed bribes to MPs on behalf of the French ambassador. In the summer of 1678 he clashed with the vehemently anti-Catholic Welsh landowner John Arnold of Monmouthshire, who challenged him to a duel, alleging that Colman was responsible for Arnold being dismissed from his office as justice of the peace (the dismissal was in fact the result of a local feud in Monmouthshire). The duel never took place. Arnold was no doubt delighted by Colman's ruin and death, but does not seem to have played any part in his downfall.

== The Popish Plot ==
Colman was targeted by Oates when the latter presented his fantasy, the Popish Plot, before the King and the Privy Council on 28 September 1678. Oates did not know Colman personally: this caused him some awkward moments at Colman's trial, where he had great difficulty in explaining his failure to recognise him at the subsequent Council meeting of 30 September. Oates however had evidently learnt enough about Colman to realise that he was vulnerable to attack, due to his intrigues with the French Court, futile though they were. According to Oates, Colman would become secretary of state on the death of Charles. It later emerged that the magistrate, Sir Edmund Berry Godfrey, had contacted Colman, who was a friend of his, shortly after the meeting and the following day Colman's house was searched; letters covering his dealings with France were uncovered.

=== Arrest ===
The warrant for his apprehension was sent out on Sunday night, 29 September. At the suggestion of Danby, Colman's papers were to be searched for thoroughly. William Bedloe carried the warrant to apprehend Colman and search for his papers. Oates, in what seems to have been an inspired piece of guesswork, had already suggested that if Colman's letters were opened, in particular his letters to Father La Chaise, they would contain treasonable matter, "which might cost him his neck". Whether this was his own notion, or whether it was suggested to him by someone else, is unclear. Colman's papers were found, some of recent date in paper bags; incriminating letters of earlier years were in a deal box, slightly nailed down. The Government expressed its surprise that after several days warning Colman should have made so little effort to hide them properly: a new pavement had recently been laid in the house, though it is not clear if it was intended as a hiding place. Inexplicably, Colman continued to deny having written the letters for several weeks after they were discovered. It is possible, as Kenyon suggests, that after a lapse of four or five years he had actually forgotten writing them, or perhaps he did not yet realise the danger they put him in. The letters were carried off, but Colman's wife declared him to be absent, and to the Government's later embarrassment she persuaded the searchers to let her keep several bundles of letters which she claimed were personal. His sister removed a trunk full of documents from his house a week later, rousing further suspicions about what incriminating evidence her brother was concealing.

On Monday morning he came forward voluntarily, and offered himself to the Secretary of State, Sir Joseph Williamson. In the afternoon he was heard before Sir Robert Southwell, and others of the Privy Council, in the presence of Oates, who was unable to recognise him. He made so "voluble and fair a defence", urging his voluntary appearance as proof of his "innocence of these vile things", that the Council, exhausted by the long day's proceedings, decided not to order his arrest. He was only committed to the care of a messenger, and his papers were not searched carefully till a week later.

The informers seemed about to lose credit when the death of Sir Edmund Berry Godfrey revived the flagging investigation. On 16 October Colman was removed from the messenger's care and committed to Newgate Prison. Even careful scrutiny of his letters revealed nothing directly pertaining to Oates' allegations, but the Government was horrified at the manner in which a minor civil servant had undertaken on behalf of a foreign power to alter the Government of England, while they were naturally irritated by the unflattering portraits Colman had given Louis XIV of themselves. The legal advice to the Crown was that some of the letters were clearly treasonable. Kenyon argues that the King decided to make an example of Colman, in order to reassure the public that the Crown would allow the law to take its course even against Court officials, and that he was happy to sacrifice a man whom he had always distrusted. By 10 November Colman, having been shown the allegedly treasonable letters, at last admitted to having written them. The strange optimism (Kenyon attributes it to a natural levity of mind) which he had shown up to then finally deserted him: he predicted correctly to the House of Lords that "I have confessed to that which will destroy me" (although many believed that he continued to hope in vain for a pardon right up to the very end).

=== Trial ===
Parliament had reassembled on 21 October, in an atmosphere of unprecedented hysteria about the Plot. Ominously for Colman, the simple cry of "Colman's letters!" was enough to cause uproar in the House of Commons. The Government decided that to appease the public's desire for blood, it was vital that a few of the suspected plotters be sacrificed as quickly as possible. The first victim of the plot was William Staley, a young Catholic banker who had allegedly vowed to kill the King (in fact the threat seems to have been simply a foolish remark spoken in drink). Staley was executed on 26 November 1678, but clearly, the death of an unknown Catholic layman would not be enough to appease public anger: indeed at Staley's trial the prosecution had some difficulty in explaining why he, as opposed to the leading Jesuit fathers, was on trial at all. On 10 November Colman was offered a pardon if he made a full confession; he was warned that if found guilty he would suffer in its full horror the gruesome death prescribed for convicted traitors. Colman refused to confess, and preparations were made to try him as quickly as possible.

On Saturday, 23 November 1678, Colman was arraigned for high treason, and the trial took place on Wednesday, the 27th, at the King's Bench bar, before the Lord Chief Justice William Scroggs and three junior judges. Scroggs was a firm believer in the Popish Plot, and although he assured Colman that he would receive a fair trial- "we seek no man's blood, but only our own safety"- there is no doubt that he was determined to secure a conviction by any means necessary.

Colman declared that he had not continued the correspondence beyond 1674. Oates swore that he had carried a treasonable letter from Colman to the rector of St. Omer, containing a sealed answer to Father La Chaise, with thanks for the ten thousand pounds given for the propagation of the Catholic religion, and chiefly to cut off the King of England. Then followed details of the narrative according to Oates of 'consults' with the Jesuits in May 1678. Arrangements had been made to assassinate the King. 'This resolve of the Jesuits was communicated to Mr. Colman in my hearing at Wild House (i.e. the Spanish Embassy in London)' said Oates. Then Oates told of a consultation in August at the Savoy, with Colman present, arranging to poison the Duke of Ormonde and to rise in rebellion. Four Irish ruffians had been sent to Windsor, and £80 for their payment was ordered to be carried by a messenger, to whom Colman gave a guinea. Ten thousand pounds were to be offered to Sir George Wakeman, physician to Queen Catherine of Braganza, to poison the king; instructions had been seen and read by Colman, copied out by him and sent to other conspirators. Colman had been appointed a principal secretary of state by commission from Father D'Oliva (Giovanni Paolo Oliva), Superior General of the Society of Jesus, (unfortunately for Colman the Government knew that he had corresponded with Oliva as well as with the French Court). In cross-examination, Oates shuffled and excused himself. In particular, he could not explain to the Court's satisfaction why he had failed to recognise Colman at the crucial Council meeting of 30 September: the judges were not impressed with his pleas that it had been late and he was tired. Bedloe was examined concerning the packets of letters from Colman to Father La Chaise in 1675, which Colman admitted to sending, and the money which Colman had received from the French Government to bribe members of Parliament; again, Colman admitted receiving the money, but insisted that he had simply pocketed it. Bedloe, there as at later trials, made a very poor impression. Scroggs, who could never resist the urge to bully a witness, even one appearing for the Crown, gave both Oates and Bedloe a most unpleasant time in the witness box, but, mindful of the need to secure a conviction, did not go so far as to accuse them of perjury. In his summing up he referred briefly to their evidence ("you have heard it") but made no comment, one way or the other, on their veracity

To spare the Duke of York any embarrassment, the prosecution did not tell the jury that Colman had ever been in his employment, instead referring vaguely to Colman holding an unspecified public office (although they can scarcely have believed that the jury were unaware of his true position). Colman in his defence could have pleaded that he had acted throughout the exchange of correspondence on the Duke's express orders. He was clearly tempted to do so, but at the last moment he seems to have suffered from a fatal hesitation (perhaps he still hoped for a pardon), and took refuge in evasion and ambiguous remarks such as "I might possibly make use of the Duke's name; it is possible, they say I did it". Scroggs, not unreasonably, said: "you have such a swimming way of melting words that it is a troublesome thing for a man to collect matter out of them".

The finding of the letters having been certified, and the handwriting identified as Colman's, they were put in evidence, and the Attorney-General William Jones laid great stress on them; they did prove the strong desire of Colman for the dissolution of parliament. He plainly had advocated foreign bribery of the king to insure such a dissolution, and used some strong phrases as to the Catholic hopes of suppressing heresy. Kenyon argues that a case may be made for his guilt, noting similarities between Colman's case and that of Thomas Wentworth, 1st Earl of Strafford, executed for treason by act of attainder in 1640.

=== Verdict and execution ===
There was no proof of any conspiracy by Colman in a plot for the assassination of, or a rebellion against Charles II except the perjured testimony of Oates and Bedloe. Nonetheless the jury, following the unmistakable instructions from Scroggs in his summing up, found Colman guilty. Scroggs replied to his solemn declarations of innocence: 'Mr. Colman, your own papers are enough to condemn you'. The next morning a sentence of death and confiscation of property was pronounced, and on Tuesday, 3 December, he was executed, avowing his faith and declaring his innocence. Some onlookers thought that he was hoping for a reprieve, even at the very end, but it did not come.

== Ring ==
A gold signet ring, believed to be Colman's, was found on the banks of Loch Lomond in 2017 by a detectorist.
