= A Ballad upon the Popish Plot =

Song

"A Ballad upon the Popish Plot" is an early modern English broadside ballad about a fabricated conspiracy known as "The Popish Plot" that occurred between 1678 and 1681 in the kingdoms of England and Scotland, during a period of widespread social and cultural prejudice against Catholicism. The song records an indictment of the Plot—a crucial consequence of national religious conflict that arguably began with the English Reformation—in the form of the ballad, one of the most time-honored and influential styles of popular music.

== Synopsis ==
The ballad describes widespread interest in the Plot across social class and region ("From Pulpit to Pot / They talk’d of a Plot" [1.5-6]), as well as the fear invoked in the general population ("frighted with Fire-balls, their heads turned round" [1.4]), but then proposes a rational and just correction of these effects. The majority of the rest of the ballad then lists the occupational types, personal characteristics, and machinations of the participants in the plot. The first is a politician “of Body unsound,” who intends to slander the Pope and the current King, Charles II, until both are forced out of power (2.1, 8). The narrator then describes the personal circumstances that brought him to instigate the plot: financial difficulty, lack of public approval, and ultimately a bribe ("Some Whisperers fix’d him / Upon this design" [3.5-6]). The other participants include a vicious, imprisoned "Knave" (4.1) complicit with another plotter who will "[Relieve] his Invention, and [quicken] his Pace" (4.9); an imprisoned thief and murderer; a perjurer who twice lied about the occurrences of the plot, bribed with money the second time; a professional in the Court who encouraged rumors of the plot with a fellow guilty court-member; and a dull-witted, ill-dressed merchant who supports the plot by writing about it in the press. The narrator ends with a "Prayer" against the plotters and for the providence and safety of the current King, and with the hope that the participants will be executed at Tyburn, a village in Middlesex County well known for capital punishment of London criminals and martyrs.

== Authorship and historical basis ==
The ballad is one of several that describe the "Popish Plot" in England and Scotland between 1678 and 1681, and the print publication of the ballad is tentatively dated from 1678 or 1679. All versions of this ballad held at the English Broadside Ballad Archive at the University of California, Santa Barbara, which are part of the James Ludovic Lindsay Crawford collection at the National Library of Scotland, indicate in the subtitle that the author is "a lady of quality." However, the compilers of The National Union Catalog Pre-1956 Imprints have identified John Gadbury (1627–1704), an English astrologer, almanac writer, and otherwise prolific author, as the composer of several versions of the ballad held at the Bodleian Library at Oxford University. Gadbury, a High Tory and Catholic convert, had been wrongfully imprisoned at the time of the Plot. However, Yale librarian and literary cataloger Donald Wing has attributed the ballad to Elizabeth Somerset Herbert Powis (1633–1691) who, along with her husband William Herbert, first Marquess of Powis (or Powys), was one of the most influential Roman Catholics of that time. As one of the “Five Catholic Lords” falsely accused by Titus Oates of plotting in the King's assassination, her husband was imprisoned in the Tower of London for six years. Her attempts to free him in the so-called "Meal-tub Plot" very nearly led to her own conviction for treason.

== Cultural and historical significance ==
This ballad is one of a group on the Popish Plot included in the Bagford Ballad collection, whose ballads depict the last years of the Stuart reign at the end of the 17th century. As the preface to the third volume of the collection describes, the value of ballads such as these is that they allow readers to "follow [...] the varying emotions" of "the average men and women" of the early modern era -- "their joys, their griefs, their boastfulness, their anger"—as well as give a narrative of important social, political, and cultural events of the time. Thus this ballad, and the group of ballads of which it is a part, serve a valuable historical and cultural function not only as records or descriptions of significant past political events but also because they give readers access to the subjective quality of the lives of that era's common people. As Joseph Woodfall Ebsworth, the editor and annotator of the second division of the published Bagford Ballad collection, evocatively phrases it: "Here, if we choose to pay attention, are clearly written the contemporary records of how men [and women] felt and spoke during the mad excitement, the servile terror, and the ferocious hatred of the days when clamours echoed against the so-called 'Popish Plot'" (viii). By giving readers access to the inner lives of the common people, and especially that part of their inner lives that was emotionally engaged by tumultuous political events such as the Popish Plot, these ballads provide a counterweight to, or throw into relief, other ballads in the collection that merely depict the social life of the Stuart kings, thus enriching our contemporary understanding of the social and political dynamics of the era. They also serve as a relevant reminder—and warning—of the power religious bigotry can exercise over a general population when allowed to develop unchecked.
