= John Warner (Jesuit) =

English Jesuit (1628–1692)

John Warner (1628–1692) was an English Jesuit, known as a controversialist and confessor to James II.

== Life ==
He was born in Warwickshire, and was educated and ordained priest in Spain. For some years prior to 1663, when he entered the Jesuit order, he held the chair of philosophy and divinity in the English College at Douai. He was afterwards successively lecturer in divinity in the Jesuit college at Liège and prolocutor of the order at Paris, where he took the fourth vow on 2 February 1673. He was appointed rector of Liège in 1678, and on 4 December 1679 provincial of his order. He was reputed to be implicated in the Popish Plot; the 1680 pamphlet A Vindication of the English Catholics against the accusations levelled at the Jesuits in the fictitious Plot is attributed to him. Warner claimed that Titus Oates had offered to sell to the Jesuits his manuscript narrative which later became the backbone of the alleged Plot, early in August 1678. He participated in the eleventh general Jesuit congregation held in Rome from 21 June to 6 September 1682 and served as rector of St. Omer from 1683 until 1686.

On the recommendation of Edward Petre, he replaced the Capuchin Father Mansuete as confessor to James II, in 1686; according to Maurice Ashley, Warner gave James moderate advice. At the time of the Glorious Revolution in 1689 he followed James to France, though detained at Gravesend where he needed forged papers to escape. He died at Paris on 21 November 1692.

== Works ==
Warner was the author of several works, including:

- Vindiciae censurae Duacenae, seu confutatio scripti cujusdam Thomae Albii contra latum a S. facilitate theologica Duacena in 22 propositiones ejus censuram. Cui praefigitur Albianae censurae scopus, et alia quaedam ejus dogmata referuntur, published under the pseudonym Jonas Thamon, Douai, 1661. Against Thomas White
- Conclusiones ex universa theologia propugnandae in Collegio Anglicano Soc. Jesu, Liège, 1670.
- Dr. Stillingfleet still against Stillingfleet or the Examination of Dr. Stillingfleet against Dr. Stillingfleet examined, 1675.
- The history of English persecution of Catholics and the Presbyterian Plot, 1678
- Anti-Fimbria, or, An answer to the animadversions upon the last speeches of the [f]ive Jesuits executed at Tyburne, 1679
- Edition, with Some Additions:&an Answer to Two Pamphlets [one, by John Phillips,] Printed in Defence of the Narrative. Item, a Relation of Some of Bedlow's Pranks in Spain, Etc. [By John Warner.], (1681)
- Duarum Epistolarum Georgii Morlaei S. T. D. et Episcopi Wintoniensis ad Janum Ulitium Revisio. In qua de Orationibus pro Defunctis, Sanctorum Invocatione, Diis Gentilium, et Idolatria agitur, 1683, (English version entitled A Revision of Dr. George Morlei's Judgment in Matters of Religion,' &c., 1683).
- Ecclesiae Primitivae Clericus: cujus Gradus, Educatio, Tonsura, Chorus, Vita Communis, Hierarchia exponuntur, 1686
- A Defence of the Doctrine and Holy Rites of the Roman Catholic Church from the Calumnies and Cavils of Dr. Burnet's "Mystery of Iniquity Unveiled," London, 1688, 2nd edit.

Warner has also been credited with the authorship of Blakloanas Haeresis olim in Pelagio et Manichaeis damnatae nunc denuo renascentis Historia et Confutatio, an attack on Thomas White (pseudonym Thomas Blackloe). It was published at Ghent, 1675, 4to, as by M. Lominus, which was really a pseudonym for Peter Talbot.

== Notes ==
Catholic Church titles
Preceded by Thomas Whitbread	Provincial superior of the English; Province of the Society of Jesus; 4 December 1679-1 July 1683	Succeeded by John Keynes
