= Richard Strange (Jesuit) =

Richard Strange (1611–1682) was an English Jesuit, now remembered as the sponsor for Titus Oates's short period of studies under the Society of Jesus, despite Oates's lack of Latin and poor reputation.

== Life ==
He was born in Northumberland, entered the Society of Jesus in 1631, and was professed of the four vows on 21 November 1646. After teaching classics in the College of St. Omer, he was sent to Durham district in 1644, and about 1651 was moved to the London mission. In 1671 he was appointed rector of the house of tertians at Ghent. He was in 1674 declared provincial of his order in this country, and he held that office for three years. His name figured in Titus Oates's list of accused Jesuits, and also in the narrative of Father Peter Hamerton. Having escaped to the continent in 1679, he became one of the consultors of Father John Warner, the provincial, and died at St. Omer on 7 April 1682.

== Works ==
His principal work is on Thomas Cantilupe. Strange translated one of Nieremberg's works, Of Adoration in Spirit and Truth, Antwerp, 1673; and left in manuscript Tractatus de septem gladiis, seu doloribus, Beatae Virginis Mariae.

== Notes ==
Catholic Church titles
Preceded by George Gray	Provincial superior of the English; Province of the Society of Jesus; 16 September 1674-14 January 1678	Succeeded by Thomas Whitbread
