= George Wakeman =

English doctor (died 1688)

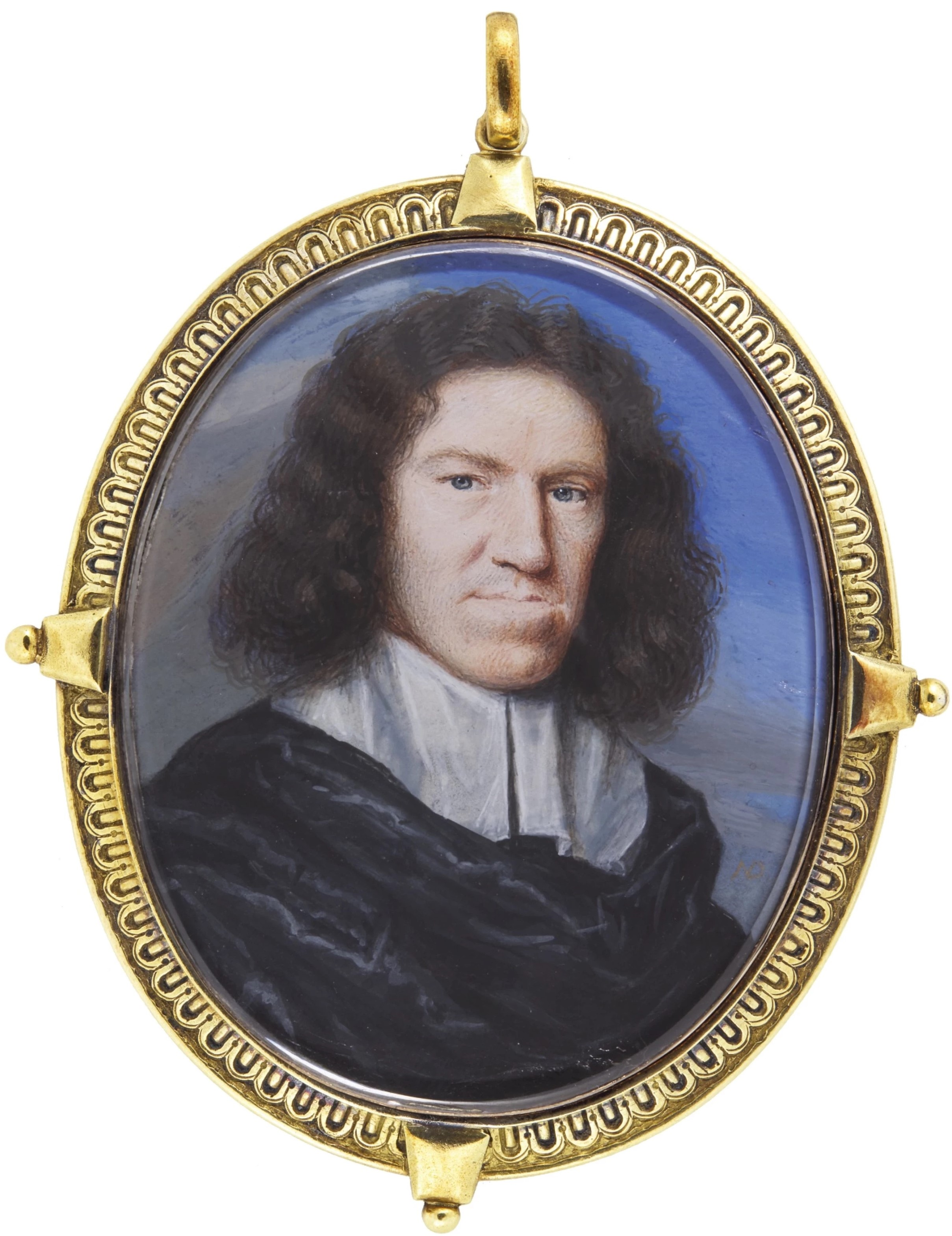
Portrait of Sir George Wakeman (by Nicholas Dixon)

Sir George Wakeman (died 1688) was an English medical doctor, who was royal physician to Catherine of Braganza, Consort of Charles II of England. In 1678, in the allegations of the fabricated Popish Plot, he was falsely accused of treason by Titus Oates, who had gained the backing of Thomas Osborne, 1st Earl of Danby, the effective head of the English government. Oates accused Wakeman of conspiring to kill the King with the help of the Jesuits, and to put his brother James, Duke of York on the throne in his place. At his trial in 1679 Wakeman was acquitted, the first sign that the public was beginning to lose faith in the reality of the Plot.

== Life ==
He was the son of Edward Wakeman (1592–1659) of the Inner Temple, by Mary (d. 1676), daughter of Richard Cotton of Warblington, Sussex. George Wakeman was raised as a Roman Catholic, and was educated abroad, probably in Paris, where he possibly graduated in medicine. Like his elder brother Richard (d. 1662), who raised a troop of horses for the king, he was a staunch royalist. On his return to England, he became involved in a plot against Oliver Cromwell, and was imprisoned until the eve of the Restoration. His record of loyalty to the Stuart dynasty was to be a crucial factor in his acquittal on charges of treason in 1679: although Charles II's gratitude to his subjects for their past services could not always be relied on, in the crisis of 1678-9 he repaid Wakeman's loyalty in full. Also, once the initial hysteria caused by the Plot died down, it became clear to most rational people that Wakeman's record of unblemished loyalty to the Crown was utterly inconsistent with the charges of treason made against him. John Evelyn, a personal friend of his, was no doubt one of many who accepted that there was a Plot of some sort but refused to believe that Wakeman, "so worthy a gentleman", had any part in it.

On 13 February 1661, as Sir George Wakeman of Beckford, he was created a baronet by Charles II, though it seems that the patent was never sealed. In August 1668 he was attending the rising statesman Sir Joseph Williamson, later Secretary of State; his appointment some two years later as physician in ordinary to Queen Catherine of Braganza is attributed to his high reputation for a Roman Catholic physician in England.

=== Popish Plot ===
In their perjured narrative of the Popish Plot, Titus Oates and Israel Tonge declared that Wakeman had been offered £10,000 to poison Charles II's posset, and that he could easily effect this through the agency of the Queen. The story went that Wakeman refused the task, and held out until £15,000 was offered to him. Then, they said, he attended the "Jesuit Consult" on 30 August 1678, received a large sum of money on account, and, the further reward of a post as physician-general in the army having been promised him, he definitely engaged to poison the king. At his first appearance before the King and his Privy Council, Wakeman defended himself with such vigour, pointing to his lifetime of loyal service to the Stuart monarchy, that the council, somewhat taken aback, did not order his arrest.

Wakeman was indicted for high treason at the Old Bailey on 18 July 1679, together with three priests, the case being tried by Lord Chief Justice William Scroggs, assisted by his fellow Chief Justice Francis North, 1st Baron Guilford and the junior King's Bench judges. Scroggs, formerly a strong believer in the Popish Plot, was on this occasion, for reasons which have never been entirely clear, firmly on the side of the accused. The chief witnesses for the prosecution were William Bedloe and Oates, who swore that he had seen the paper appointing Wakeman to the post of physician-general. It was elicited from Oates in the course of the proceedings that he was incapable at the time alluded to of identifying either Wakeman's person or his handwriting. Wakeman and his co-accused all defended themselves with great vigour (in a case of treason the accused was not entitled to counsel until the passage of the Treason Act 1695), and their witnesses received a far more courteous hearing than defence witnesses in previous trials had. In particular, Ellen Rigby, the housekeeper to the Benedictine order in London, was listened to with a respect not often accorded to a Catholic woman in that age. Scroggs in his summing up commented severely upon the character of the evidence, stressed his reluctance to shed innocent blood, (a reluctance which had certainly not been evident in previous Plot trials), and warned the jury that while he still believed in the Plot, it must not be assumed that all those accused were party to it. The jury, after asking if they might find the prisoners guilty of misprision of treason, and being told they could not, found all the prisoners not guilty.

The acquittal dealt a severe blow to the credibility of the "Plot", but there was a public backlash also. The jurors had to flee their homes for fear of the mob, and a dead dog was thrown at Scroggs. When the Portuguese Ambassador, the Marquis of Arronches, called on Scroggs in person to congratulate him on Wakeman's acquittal (historians have called the Ambassador's action one of "incredible folly"), the public, perhaps not unreasonably, assumed that the judge had been bribed. Wakeman went to Windsor Castle to see the queen and king, and left the country. In the course of evidence given at subsequent trials Oates entirely ignored the verdict, and continued to speak of the bribe offered to and accepted by the queen's physician. Wakeman was back in London by 1685, and gave evidence against Oates on 8 May 1685, in his first trial for perjury. Nothing is known of his further career.
