= William Bedloe =

English fraudster and Popish Plot informer

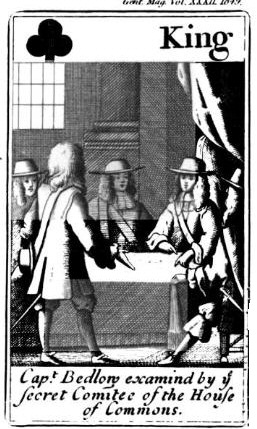
Bedloe as shown in a set of playing cards depicting the Popish Plot by Francis Barlow, c. 1679

William Bedloe (20 April 1650 – 20 August 1680) was an English fraudster and Popish Plot informer.

== Life ==
He was born at Chepstow in Monmouthshire; he was probably the son of Isaac Bedloe, himself the son of an Irish Army officer, and a cousin of William Kemys (or Kemish), who became High Sheriff of Monmouthshire in 1678. Bedloe appears to have been well educated; he was certainly clever, and after moving to London in 1670 he became acquainted with some Jesuits and was occasionally employed by them. Calling himself at one time Captain Williams, at others Lord Gerard or Lord Newport or Lord Cornwallis, he travelled from one part of Europe to another, usually accompanied by his brother James. In the 1670s he was imprisoned for fraud and became an expert in a number of criminal enterprises. The historian John Kenyon described him as "an experienced member of a London underworld of crime and vice of which we know almost nothing".

Then in 1678, following the lead of Titus Oates, he gave an account of a supposed Popish Plot to the English government, and his version of the details of the murder of Sir Edmund Berry Godfrey was rewarded with £500. Kenyon concluded that while Bedloe probably had no direct knowledge about Godfrey's murder, he had learned enough about it from his extensive contacts in the criminal underworld to tell a convincing story. His record as a confidence trickster was so notorious that he chose to dwell on it, explaining that it was his career as a criminal which enabled him to give first-hand evidence about the plotters. While some government officials, like Henry Coventry, were wary of relying on the testimony of such a notorious criminal, the general view was that he was too valuable as a corroborative witness to Oates to be disregarded. However, his testimony was usually of little value, apart from during the trial of Berry, Green and Hill for Godfrey's murder, of which he may have had some personal knowledge: as a witness, he was rambling and incoherent, and had a habit of dragging in irrelevant grievances and private feuds. At most of the Popish Plot trials, like that of Edward Colman, his evidence was so weak that the Court disregarded it.

Emboldened by his success he denounced various Roman Catholics, married an Irish woman named Anna Purefoy, and having become very popular lived in luxurious fashion. Afterwards his fortunes waned, and he died at Bristol on 20 August 1680. His dying depositions, which were taken by Sir Francis North, Chief Justice of the Common Pleas, revealed nothing of importance. Bedloe wrote a Narrative and impartial discovery of the horrid Popish Plot (1679), but all his statements are considered untrustworthy.

Lady Worcester, whose husband was an indirect target of Bedloe's accusations called him "a man whose whole life has been pageantry and villainy and whose word would not have been taken at sixpence". John Jeffreys, MP for Brecon and later Master of the Royal Hospital Kilmainham, who knew Bedloe personally, also denounced him as a villain. At Oates's trial for perjury, some years after Bedloe's death, Lord Chief Justice Jeffreys, who had condemned innocent men on Bedloe's evidence, called him the "infamous Bedloe".

== Sources ==
- Pollock, John. The Popish Plot, 1903.
- Kenyon, J.P. The Popish Plot, Phoenix Press Reissues, 2000
- Ebsworth, Joseph Woodfall (1885). "Bedloe, William" . In Stephen, Leslie (ed.). Dictionary of National Biography. Vol. 4. London: Smith, Elder & Co.
