= Popish Plot =

1678–1681 English anti-Catholic hysteria

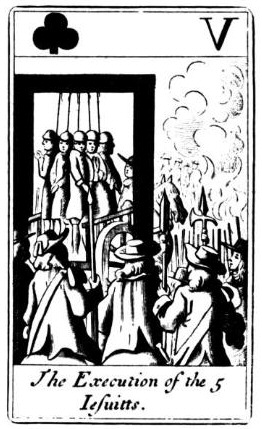
The execution of the five Jesuits

The Popish Plot was a fictitious conspiracy invented by Titus Oates that between 1678 and 1681 gripped the kingdoms of England and Scotland in anti-Catholic hysteria. Oates alleged that there was an extensive Catholic conspiracy to assassinate Charles II, accusations that led to the show trials and executions of at least 22 men and precipitated the Exclusion Bill Crisis. During this tumultuous period, Oates wove an intricate web of accusations, fuelling public fears and paranoia. However, as time went on, the lack of substantial evidence and inconsistencies in Oates's testimony began to unravel the plot. Eventually, Oates himself was arrested and convicted for perjury, exposing the fabricated nature of the conspiracy.

== Background ==
=== Development of English anti-Catholicism ===
The fictitious Popish Plot must be understood against the background of the English Reformation and the subsequent development of a strong anti-Catholic nationalist sentiment among the mostly Protestant population of England.

The English Reformation began in 1533, when King Henry VIII (1509–1547) sought an annulment of his marriage to Catherine of Aragon to marry Anne Boleyn. As the pope would not grant this, Henry broke away from Rome and took control of the Church in England. Later, he had the monasteries dissolved, causing opposition in the still largely Catholic nation. Under Henry's son Edward VI (1547–1553), the Church of England was transformed into a strictly Protestant body, with many remnants of Catholicism suppressed. Edward was succeeded by his half-sister Mary I (1553–1558), daughter of Henry VIII and Catherine. She was a Catholic and returned the Church in England to union with the Holy See. Mary tainted her policy with two unpopular actions: she married her cousin King Philip II of Spain, where the Inquisition continued, and had 300 Protestants burned at the stake, causing many Englishmen to associate Catholicism with the involvement of foreign powers and religious persecution.

Mary was succeeded by her Protestant half-sister, Elizabeth I (1558–1603), who again broke away from Rome and suppressed Catholicism. Elizabeth and later Protestant monarchs caused hundreds of Catholic priests and laymen to be hanged and mutilated. This, and her dubious legitimacy – she was the daughter of Henry VIII and Anne Boleyn – led to Catholic powers not recognising her as queen and favouring her next relative, the Catholic Mary, Queen of Scots. Elizabeth's reign saw Catholic rebellions like the Rising of the North (1569) as well as intrigues like the Ridolfi Plot (1571) and the Babington Plot (1586), both intending to kill Elizabeth and replace her with Mary under a Spanish invasion. Three popes issued bulls judging Elizabeth, giving grounds to suspect English Catholics' loyalty. Following the Babington Plot, Mary was beheaded in 1587. This – and Elizabeth's support of the Dutch Revolt in the Spanish Netherlands – triggered Philip II of Spain's attempted invasion with the Spanish Armada (1588). This reinforced English resentment of Catholics, while the Armada's failure convinced many Englishmen that God was on the Protestant side.

Anti-Catholic sentiment reached new heights in 1605 after the failed Gunpowder Plot. Catholic conspirators attempted to topple the Protestant reign of King James I by exploding a bomb during the King's opening of parliament. The plot was thwarted when Guy Fawkes, who was in charge of the explosives, was discovered the night before. The magnitude of the plot, meant to kill the leading government figures in one stroke, convinced many Englishmen that Catholics were murderous conspirators who would stop at nothing to have their way, laying the groundwork for future allegations.

=== Anti-Catholicism in the 17th century ===
Anti-Catholic sentiment was a constant factor in how England perceived the events of the following decades: the Thirty Years War (1618–1648) was seen as an attempt by the Catholic Habsburgs to exterminate German Protestantism. Under the early Stuart Kings, fears of Catholic conspiracies were rampant and the policies of Charles I – especially his church policies, which had a decidedly high church bent – were seen as pro-Catholic and likely induced by a Catholic conspiracy headed by Charles' Catholic queen, Henrietta Maria of France. This, together with accounts of Catholic atrocities in Ireland in 1641, helped trigger the English Civil War (1642–1649), which led to the abolition of the monarchy and a decade of Puritan rule tolerating most forms of Protestantism, but not Catholicism. The restoration of the monarchy in 1660 under King Charles II brought a reaction against all religious dissenters outside the established Church of England. Catholics still suffered under popular hostility and legal discrimination.

Anti-Catholic hysteria flared up lightly during the reign of Charles II, which saw disasters such as the Great Plague of London (1665) and the Great Fire of London (1666). Vague rumours blamed the fire on arson by Catholics and especially Jesuits. Kenyon remarks, "At Coventry, the townspeople were possessed by the idea that the papists were about to rise and cut their throats ... A nationwide panic seemed likely, and as homeless refugees poured out from London into the countryside, they took with them stories of a kind which were to be familiar enough in 1678 and 1679."

Anti-Catholicism was fuelled by doubts about the religious allegiance of the King, who had been supported by the Catholic powers during his exile, and had married a Portuguese Catholic princess, Catherine of Braganza. Charles formed an alliance with the leading Catholic power France against the Protestant Netherlands. Furthermore, Charles' brother and heir presumptive, James, Duke of York, had embraced Catholicism, although his brother forbade him to make any public avowal. In 1672, Charles issued the Royal Declaration of Indulgence, in which he suspended all penal laws against Catholics and other religious dissenters. This fuelled Protestant fears of increasing Catholic influence in England, and led to conflict with parliament during the 1670s. In December 1677 an anonymous pamphlet (possibly by Andrew Marvell) spread alarm in London by accusing the Pope of plotting to overthrow the lawful government of England.

== Events ==
=== Beginnings ===
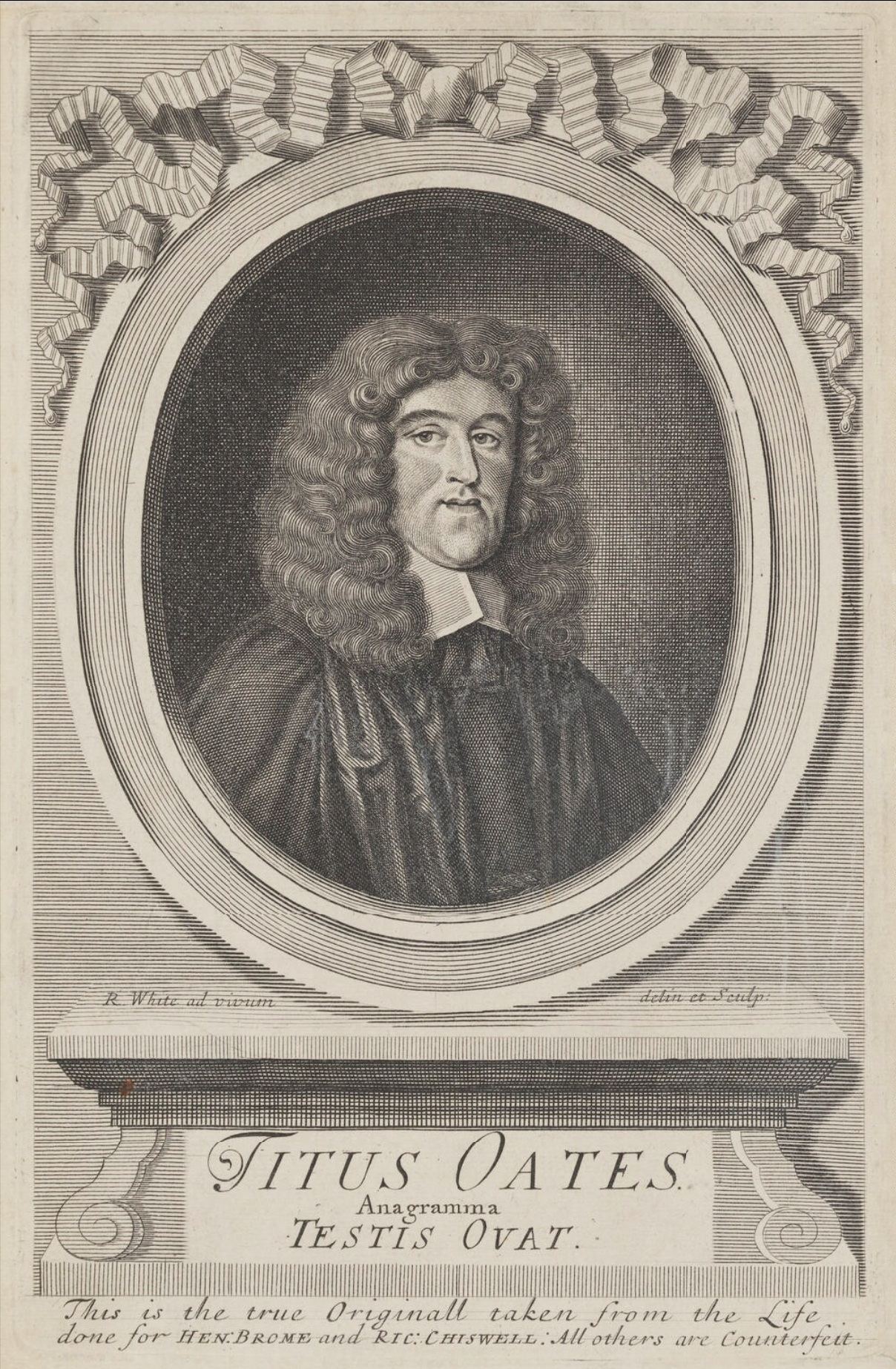
Titus Oates, perpetrator of the "Popish Plot"

The fictitious Popish Plot unfolded in a very peculiar fashion. Titus Oates and Israel Tonge, two anti-Catholic clergymen, wrote a large manuscript that accused the Catholic Church authorities of approving the assassination of Charles II. The Jesuits in England were to carry out the task. The manuscript also named nearly 100 Jesuits and their supporters who were supposedly involved in this assassination plot; nothing in the document was ever proven to be true.

Oates slipped a copy of the manuscript into the wainscot of a gallery in the house of the physician Sir Richard Barker, with whom Tonge was living. The following day Tonge claimed to find the manuscript and showed it to an acquaintance, Christopher Kirkby, who was shocked and decided to inform the King. Kirkby was a chemist and a former assistant in Charles' scientific experiments, and Charles prided himself on being approachable to the general public. On 13 August 1678, whilst Charles was out walking in St. James's Park, the chemist informed him of the plot. Charles was dismissive but Kirkby stated that he knew the names of assassins who planned to shoot the King and, if that failed, the Queen's physician, Sir George Wakeman, would poison him. When the King demanded proof, the chemist offered to bring Tonge who knew of these matters personally. The King did agree to see both Kirkby and Tonge that evening, when he gave them a short audience. At this stage, he was already sceptical, but he was apparently not ready to rule out the possibility that there might be a plot of some sort (otherwise, Kenyon argues, he would not have given these two very obscure men a private audience). Charles told Kirkby to present Tonge to Thomas Osborne, Lord Danby, Lord High Treasurer, then the most influential of the King's ministers. Tonge then lied to Danby, saying that he had found the manuscript but did not know the author.

=== Investigations ===
As Kenyon points out, the government took seriously even the remotest hint of a threat to the King's life or well-being – in the previous spring a Newcastle housewife had been investigated by the Secretary of State simply for saying that "the King gets the curse of many good and faithful wives such as myself for his bad example". Danby, who seems to have believed in the Plot, advised the King to order an investigation. Charles II denied the request, maintaining that the entire affair was absurd. He told Danby to keep the events secret so as not to put the idea of regicide into people's minds. However, word of the manuscript spread to the Duke of York, who publicly called for an investigation into the matter. Even Charles admitted that given the sheer number of allegations, he could not say positively that none of them was true, and reluctantly agreed. During the investigation, Oates' name arose. From the first, the King was convinced that Oates was a liar, and Oates did not help his case by claiming to have met the regent of Spain, John of Austria. Questioned by the King, who had met John in Brussels in 1656, it became obvious that Oates had no idea what he looked like. The King had a long and frank talk with Paul Barillon, the French ambassador, in which he made it clear that he did not believe that there was a word of truth in the plot, and that Oates was "a wicked man"; but that by now he had come round to the view that there must be an investigation, particularly with Parliament about to reassemble.

On 6 September Oates was summoned before the magistrate Sir Edmund Berry Godfrey to swear an oath prior to his testimony before the King. Oates claimed he had been at a Jesuit meeting held at the White Horse Tavern in the Strand, London, on April 24, 1678. According to Oates, the purpose of that meeting was to discuss the assassination of Charles II. The meeting discussed a variety of methods which included: stabbing by Irish ruffians, shooting by two Jesuit soldiers, or poisoning by the Queen's physician, Sir George Wakeman.

Oates and Tonge were brought before the Privy Council later that month, and the Council interrogated Oates for several hours; Tonge, who was generally believed to be mad, was simply laughed at, but Oates made a much better impression on the council. On 28 September Oates made 43 allegations against various members of Catholic religious orders – including 541 Jesuits – and numerous Catholic nobles. He accused Sir George Wakeman and Edward Colman, the secretary to Mary of Modena Duchess of York, of planning the assassination. Colman was found to have corresponded with the French Jesuit Fr Ferrier, confessor to Louis XIV, outlining his grandiose schemes for obtaining a dissolution of the present Parliament, in the hope of its replacement by a new and pro-French Parliament; in the wake of this revelation he was condemned to death for treason. Wakeman was later acquitted. Despite Oates' unsavoury reputation, the councillors were impressed by his confidence, his grasp of detail and his remarkable memory. A turning point came when he was shown five letters, supposedly written by well-known priests and giving details of the plot, which he was suspected of forging: Oates "at a single glance" named each of the alleged authors. At this the council were "amazed" and began to give much greater credence to the plot; apparently it did not occur to them that Oates' ability to recognise the letters made it more likely, rather than less, that he had forged them.

Others Oates accused included Dr. William Fogarty, Archbishop Peter Talbot of Dublin, Samuel Pepys and John Belasyse, 1st Baron Belasyse. The list grew to 81 accusations. Oates was given a squad of soldiers and he began to round up Jesuits.

=== Godfrey's murder ===
The allegations gained little credence until the murder of Sir Edmund Berry Godfrey, a magistrate and strong supporter of Protestantism, to whom Oates had made his first depositions. His disappearance on 12 October 1678, the finding of his mutilated body on 17 October, and the subsequent failure to solve his murder sent the Protestant population into an uproar. He had been strangled and run through with his own sword. Many of his supporters blamed the murder on Catholics. As Kenyon commented, "Next day, the 18th, James wrote to William of Orange that Godfrey's death was already 'laid against the Catholics', and even he, never the most realistic of men, feared that 'all these things happening together will cause a great flame in the Parliament'." The Lords asked King Charles to banish all Catholics from a radius of 20 miles (32 km) around London, which Charles granted on 30 October 1678, but it was too late because London was already in a panic, which was long remembered as "Godfrey's autumn".

Oates seized on Godfrey's murder as proof that the plot was true. The murder of Godfrey and the discovery of Edward Coleman's letters provided a solid basis of facts for the lies of Oates and the other informers who followed him. Oates was called to testify before the House of Lords and the House of Commons on 23 October 1678. He testified that he had seen a number of contracts signed by the Superior General of the Jesuits. The contracts appointed officers that would command an army of Catholic supporters to kill Charles II and establish a Catholic monarch. To this day, no one is certain who killed Sir Edmund Godfrey, and most historians regard the mystery as insoluble. Oates' associate William Bedloe denounced the silversmith Miles Prance, who in turn named three working men, Berry, Green and Hill, who were tried, convicted and executed in February 1679; but it rapidly became clear that they were completely innocent, and that Prance, who had been subjected to torture, named them simply to gain his freedom (Kenyon suggests that he may have chosen men against whom he had a personal grudge, or he may simply have chosen them because they were the first Catholic acquaintances of his who came to mind).

=== The Plot before Parliament ===
King Charles, aware of the unrest, returned to London and summoned Parliament. He remained unconvinced by Oates' accusations, but Parliament and public opinion forced him to order an investigation. Parliament truly believed that this plot was real, declaring, "This House is of opinion that there hath been and still is a damnable and hellish plot contrived and carried out by the popish recusants for assigning and murdering the King." Tonge was called to testify on 25 October 1678 where he gave evidence on the Great Fire and, later, rumours of another similar plot. On 1 November, both Houses ordered an investigation in which a Frenchman, Choqueux, was discovered to be storing gunpowder in a house nearby. This caused a panic, until it was discovered that he was simply the King's firework maker.

=== Trial of the Five Catholic Lords ===
Oates became more daring and accused five Catholic lords (William Herbert, 1st Marquess of Powis, William Howard, 1st Viscount Stafford, Henry Arundell, 3rd Baron Arundell of Wardour, William Petre, 4th Baron Petre and John Belasyse, 1st Baron Belasyse) of involvement in the plot. The King dismissed the accusations as absurd, pointing out that Belasyse was so afflicted with gout that he could hardly stand, while Arundell and Stafford, who had not been on speaking terms for 25 years, were most unlikely to be intriguing together; but Anthony Ashley Cooper, 1st Earl of Shaftesbury had the lords arrested and sent to the Tower on 25 October 1678. Seizing upon the anti-Catholic tide, Shaftesbury publicly demanded that the King's brother, James, be excluded from the royal succession, prompting the Exclusion crisis. On 5 November 1678, people burned effigies of the Pope instead of those of Guy Fawkes. At the end of the year, the parliament passed a bill, a second Test Act, excluding Catholics from membership of both Houses (a law not repealed until 1829).

On 1 November 1678, the House of Commons resolved to proceed by impeachment against "the five popish lords". On 23 November all Arundell's papers were seized and examined by the Lords' committee; on 3 December the five peers were arraigned for high treason; and on 5 December the Commons announced the impeachment of Arundell. A month later Parliament was dissolved, and the proceedings were interrupted. In March 1679, it was resolved by both houses that the dissolution had not invalidated the motions for the impeachment. On 10 April 1679 Arundell and three of his companions (Belasyse was too ill to attend) were brought to the House of Lords to put in pleas against the articles of impeachment. Arundell complained of the uncertainty of the charges, and implored the peers to have them "reduced to competent certainty" but on 24 April this plea was voted irregular, and on 26 April the prisoners were again brought to the House of Lords and ordered to amend their pleas. Arundell replied by briefly declaring himself not guilty.

The impeachment trial was fixed for 13 May, but a quarrel between the two houses as to points of procedure, and the legality of admitting the bishops as judges in a capital trial, followed by a dissolution, delayed its commencement until 30 November 1680. On that day it was decided to proceed first against Lord Stafford, who was condemned to death on 7 December and beheaded on 29 December. His trial, compared to the other Plot trials, was reasonably fair, but as in all cases of alleged treason at that date the absence of defence counsel was a fatal handicap (this was finally remedied in 1695), and while Oates' credit had been seriously damaged, the evidence of the principal prosecution witnesses, Turberville and Dugdale, struck even fair-minded observers like John Evelyn as being credible enough. Stafford, denied the services of counsel, failed to exploit several inconsistencies in Tuberville's testimony, which a good lawyer might have turned to his client's advantage.

On 30 December, the evidence against Arundell and his three fellow prisoners was ordered to be in readiness, but their public proceedings stopped. In fact, the death of William Bedloe left the prosecution in serious difficulties, since one protection for a person accused of treason, that there must be two eyewitnesses to an overt act of treason, was observed scrupulously, and only Oates claimed to have any hard evidence against the remaining Lords. Lord Petre died in the Tower in 1683. His companions remained there until 12 February 1684 when an appeal to the Court of King's Bench to release them on bail was successful. On 21 May 1685 Arundell, Powis, and Belasyse came to the House of Lords to present petitions for the annulling of the charges and on the following day the petitions were granted. On 1 June 1685, their liberty was formally assured on the ground that the witnesses against them had perjured themselves, and on 4 June the bill of attainder against Stafford was reversed.

=== Height of the hysteria ===
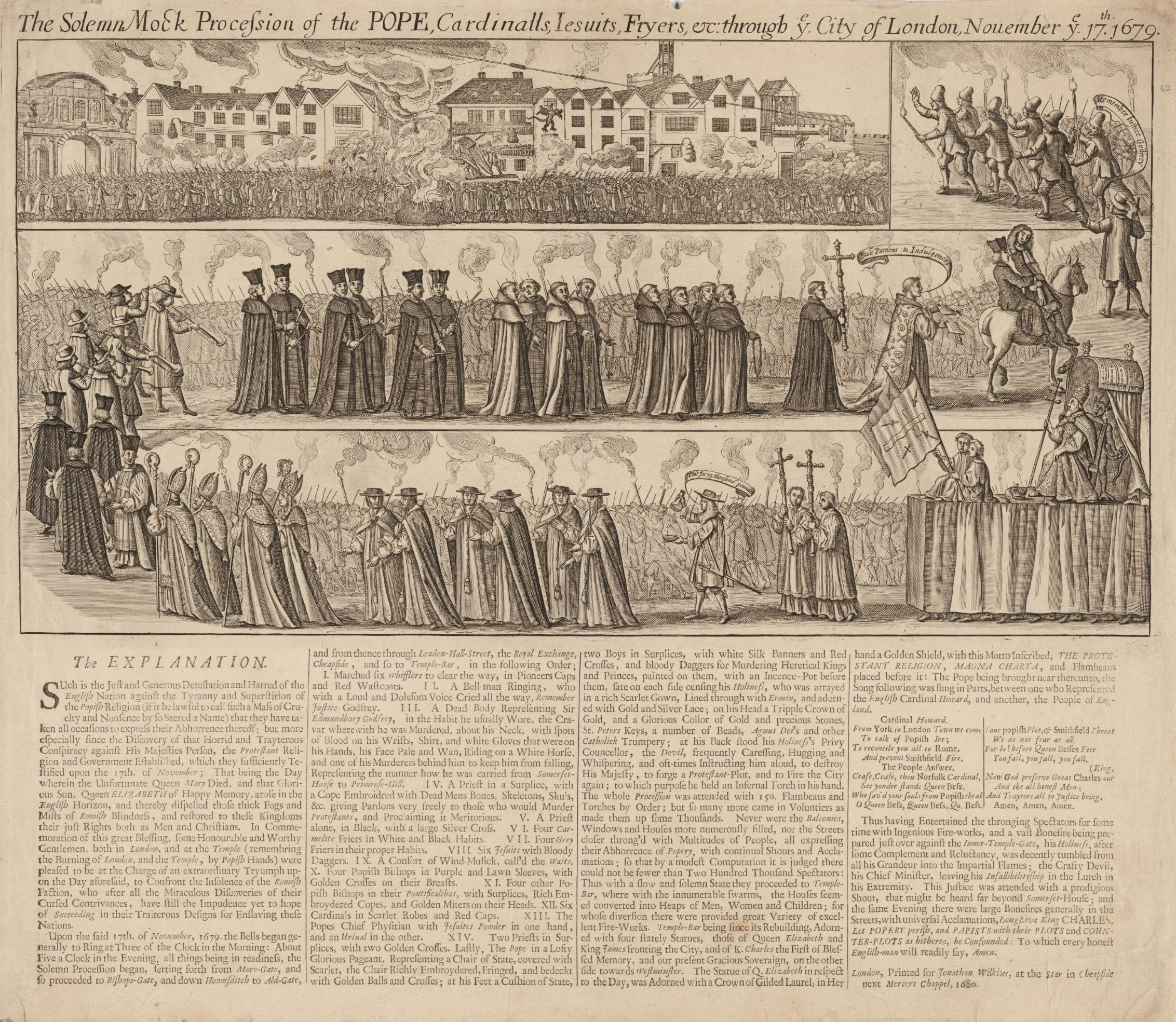
Broadside, "The Solemn Mock Procession of the POPE, Cardinalls, Iesuits, Fryers etc: through y^{e} City of London, November y^{e} 17th. 1679."

On 24 November 1678, Oates claimed the Queen was working with the King's physician to poison him and enlisted the aid of "Captain" William Bedloe, a notorious member of the London underworld. The King personally interrogated Oates, caught him out in a number of inaccuracies and lies, and ordered his arrest. However, a few days later, with the threat of constitutional crisis, Parliament forced the release of Oates.

Hysteria continued: Roger North wrote that it was as though "the very Cabinet of Hell has been opened". Noblewomen carried firearms if they had to venture outdoors at night. Houses were searched for hidden guns, mostly without any significant result. Some Catholic widows tried to ensure their safety by marrying Anglican widowers. The House of Commons was searched – without result – in the expectation of a second Gunpowder Plot.

Anyone even suspected of being Catholic was driven out of London and forbidden to be within ten miles (16 km) of the city. William Staley, a young Catholic banker, made a drunken threat against the King; within 10 days he was tried, convicted of plotting treason and executed. In calmer times, Staley's offence would probably have resulted in him being bound over, a mild punishment. Oates, for his part, received a state apartment in Whitehall and an annual allowance. He soon presented new allegations, claiming assassins intended to shoot the King with silver bullets so the wound would not heal. The public invented their own stories, including a tale that the sound of digging had been heard near the House of Commons and rumours of a French invasion on the Isle of Purbeck. The evidence of Oates and Bedloe was supplemented by other informers; some like Thomas Dangerfield, were notorious criminals, but others like Stephen Dugdale, Robert Jenison and Edward Turberville were men of good social standing who from motives of greed or revenge denounced innocent victims, and by their apparently plausible evidence made the Plot seem more credible. Dugdale in particular made such a good initial impression that even the King for the first time "began to think that there might be somewhat in the Plot".

=== Waning of the hysteria ===
However, public opinion began to turn against Oates. As Kenyon points out, the steady protestations of innocence by all of those who were executed eventually took hold in the public mind. Outside London, the priests who died were almost all venerable and popular members of the community, and there was widespread public horror at their executions. Modern historians generally agree that Shaftesbury did not sincerely believe the Popish Plot allegations but used the crisis to weaken the position of the Catholic Duke of York and to promote the Exclusion Bill. Although he later expressed concern about the excesses of the prosecutions, there is no evidence that he intervened to secure the release of imprisoned priests or played any direct role in judicial decisions related to the Plot Accusations of plotting in Yorkshire (the "Barnbow Plot"), where prominent local Catholics like Sir Thomas Gascoigne, 2nd Baronet were accused of signing "the Bloody Oath of Secrecy", were unsuccessful because their Protestant neighbours (who sat on the juries) refused to convict them. A grand jury at Westminster rejected the plotting charge against Sir John Fitzgerald, 2nd Baronet in 1681. Judges gradually began to take a more impartial line, ruling that it was not treason for a Catholic to advocate the conversion of England to the old faith, nor to give financial support to religious houses (the latter was a criminal offence, just not treason). The supposed plot gained some credence in Ireland, where the two Catholic Archbishops, Plunkett and Talbot, were the principal victims, but not in Scotland.

Having had at least twenty-two innocent men executed (the last being Oliver Plunkett, the Catholic Archbishop of Armagh on 1 July 1681), Chief Justice William Scroggs began to declare people innocent and the King began to devise countermeasures. The King, who was notably tolerant of religious differences and generally inclined to clemency, was embittered at the number of innocent men he had been forced to condemn; possibly thinking of the Indemnity and Oblivion Act 1660 (12 Cha. 2. c. 11), under which he had pardoned many of his former opponents in 1660, he remarked that his people had never previously had cause to complain of his mercy. At the trial of Sir George Wakeman, and several priests who were tried with him, Scroggs virtually ordered the jury to acquit all of them, and despite public uproar, the King made it clear that he approved of Scroggs' conduct. On 31 August 1681, Oates was told to leave his apartments in Whitehall, but remained undeterred and even denounced the King and the Duke of York. He was arrested for sedition, sentenced to a fine of £100,000 and thrown into prison.

When James II acceded to the throne in 1685 he had Oates tried on two charges of perjury. The Bench which tried him was presided over by the formidable George Jeffreys, 1st Baron Jeffreys, who conducted the trial in such a manner that Oates had no hope of acquittal, and the jury brought in the expected guilty verdict. The death penalty was not available for perjury and Oates was sentenced to be stripped of clerical dress, whipped through London twice, and imprisoned for life and pilloried every year (the penalties were so severe that it has been argued that Jeffreys was trying to kill Oates by ill-treatment). Oates spent the next three years in prison. At the accession of William of Orange and Mary in 1689, he was pardoned and granted a pension of £260 a year, but his reputation did not recover. The pension was suspended, but in 1698 was restored and increased to £300 a year. Oates died on 12 or 13 July 1705, quite forgotten by the public which had once called him a hero.

Of the other informers, James II was content merely to fine Miles Prance for his perjury, on the grounds that he was a Catholic and had been coerced by threats of torture into informing. Thomas Dangerfield was subjected to the same savage penalties as Oates; on returning from his first session in the pillory, Dangerfield died of an eye injury after a scuffle with the barrister Robert Francis, who was hanged for his murder. Bedloe, Turbervile and Dugdale had all died of natural causes while the Plot was still officially regarded as true.

== Long-term effects ==
The Society of Jesus suffered the most between 1678 and 1681. During this period, nine Jesuits were executed and twelve died in prison. Three other deaths were attributable to the hysteria. They also lost Combe in Herefordshire, which was the Jesuit headquarters for south Wales. A quote from French Jesuit Claude de la Colombière highlights the plight of the Jesuits during this time period. He comments, "The name of the Jesuit is hated above all else, even by priests both secular and regular, and by the Catholic laity as well, because it is said that the Jesuits have caused this raging storm, which is likely to overthrow the whole Catholic religion".

Other Catholic religious orders such as the Carmelites, Franciscans, and the Benedictines were also affected by the hysteria. They were no longer permitted to have more than a certain number of members or missions within England. John Kenyon points out that European religious orders throughout the Continent were affected since many of them depended on the alms of the English Catholic community for their existence. Many Catholic priests were arrested and tried because the Privy Council wanted to make sure to catch all of those who might possess information about the supposed plot.

The hysteria had serious consequences for ordinary British Catholics as well as priests. On 30 October 1678, a proclamation was made that required all Catholics who were not tradesmen or property owners to leave London and Westminster. They were not to enter a twelve-mile (c.19 km) radius of the city without special permission. Throughout this period Catholics were subject to fines, harassment and imprisonment. It was not until the early 19th century that most of the anti-Catholic legislation was removed by the Roman Catholic Relief Act 1829; anti-Catholic sentiment remained even longer among politicians and the general populace, although the Gordon Riots of 1780 made it clear to sensible observers that Catholics were far more likely to be the victims of violence than its perpetrators.

== Gallery of playing cards ==
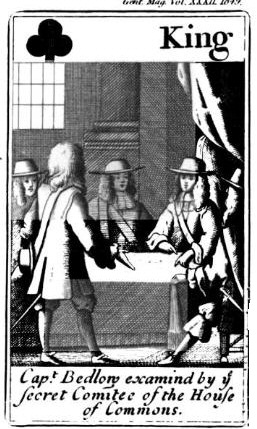
Informer William Bedloe

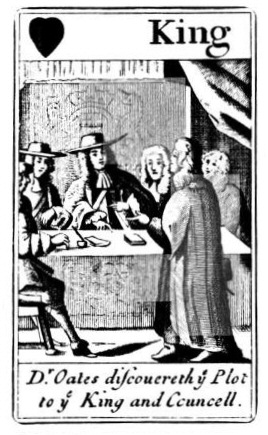
Titus Oates uncovers the supposed plot

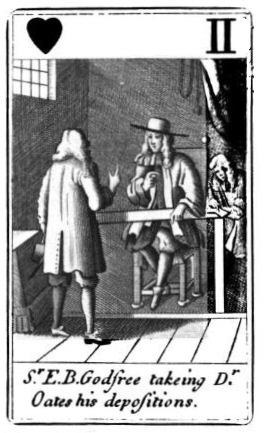
Magistrate Edmund Berry Godfrey with Oates

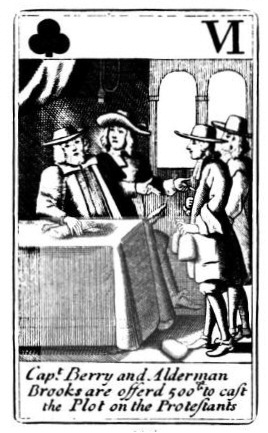
William Brooks, Alderman of Dublin

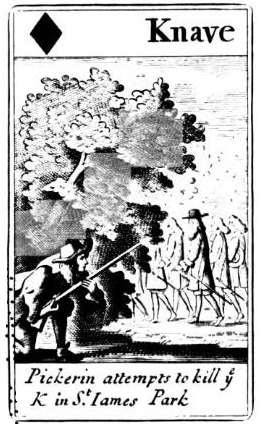
Thomas Pickering, Benedictine monk

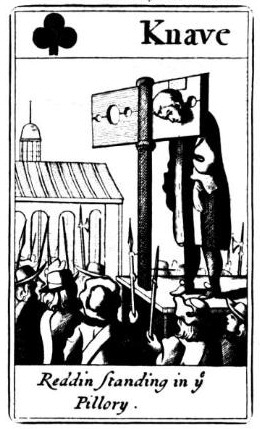
Nathaniel Reading in Pillory

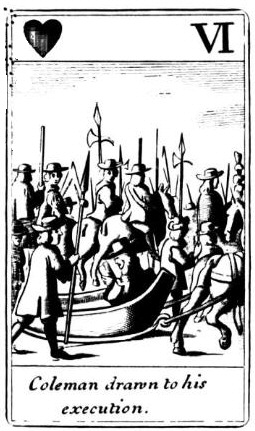
Edward Colman

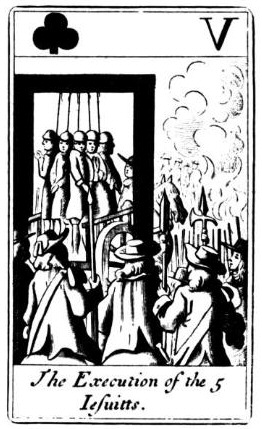
The execution of the five Jesuits

== See also ==
- A Ballad upon the Popish Plot
- "A True Narrative of the Horrid Hellish Popish Plot"
- Anti-Catholicism
- Crypto-papism
