= John Scott (1639–1695) =

English clergyman

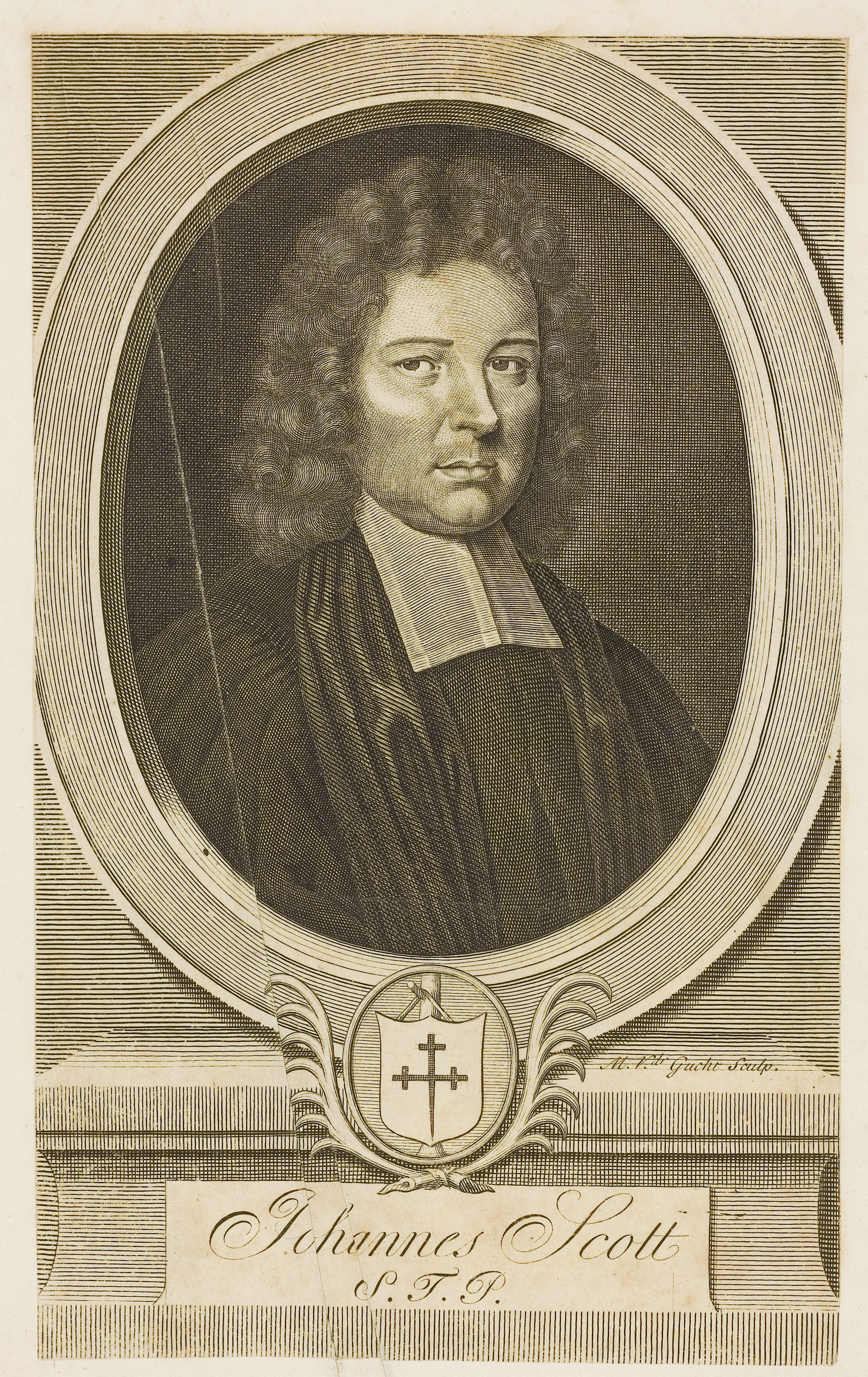
John Scott (by Michael Vandergucht)

John Scott (1639–1695) was an English clergyman, known as a devotional writer, and a defender of Anglican orthodoxy in his preaching.

== Life ==
He was son of Thomas Scott, a grazier of Chippenham, Wiltshire, and served as a youth a three years' apprenticeship in London. Then, changing his course of life, he matriculated at New Inn Hall, Oxford, 13 December 1658. He took no degree at the time, but later in life proceeded B.D. and D.D. (9 July 1685). He became successively minister of St Thomas, Southwark, perpetual curate of Trinity in the Minories, rector of St Peter-le-Poor, 1 February 1678 (resigned before August 1691), and rector of St Giles-in-the-Fields, being presented to the last benefice by the king, 7 August 1691. He was buried on 15 March 1694/5 (Old Style) in the rector's vault in St. Giles-in-the-Fields Church. He held a canonry of St Paul's Cathedral from 1685 till his death.

== Works ==
Besides sermons published separately and preached on public occasions, Scott wrote:

- The Christian Life from its beginning to its Consummation in Glory … with directions for private devotion and forms of prayer fitted to the several states of Christians, pts. i. and ii. The work ultimately extended to five volumes.
- Certain Cases of Conscience concerning the Lawfulness of Joyning with Forms of Prayer in Publick Worship. In reply to this appeared An Answer to Dr. Scot's Case against Dissenters concerning Forms of Prayer and the Fallacy of the Story of Common plainly discovered, 1700.
- The Eighth Note of the Church Examined, viz. Sanctity of Doctrine
- The texts examined which papists cite out of the Bible for the proof of their doctrine and for prayers in an unknown tongue.
- Practical Discourses upon Several Subjects,

Scott wrote a preface for the second edition of John March's sermons, 1699, and his Works, with the funeral sermon preached at his death by Zacheus Isham, were collected in 1718. In the Devout Christian's Companion, (1708; 1722) are "private devotions by J. S[cott]", and some quotations from his book are given in Philipp van Limborch's Book of Divinity and other devotional works.

== Notes ==
Attribution

This article incorporates text from a publication now in the public domain: "Scott, John (1639-1695)". Dictionary of National Biography. London: Smith, Elder & Co. 1885–1900.
