= Robert Boreman =

Robert Boreman or Bourman (died 1675) D.D, was a Church of England clergyman who supported the Royalist cause in the English Civil War.

== Biography ==
Boreman was a member of a family which came originally from the Isle of Wight, and brother of Sir William Bourman, clerk of the green cloth to King Charles II. He received his education at Westminster School, whence he was elected in 1627 to a scholarship at Trinity College, Cambridge. He graduated B.A. in 1631; was admitted a minor fellow of his college on 4 October 1633, and a major fellow on 10 March 1634; and proceeded to the degree of M.A. in 1635.

Like other royalists, Boreman was deprived of his fellowship, but was restored to it in 1660. He was also created D.D. by virtue of letters mandatory from King Charles II dated 9 Aug. 1660. On 15 October in the same year he was admitted by the Archbishop of Canterbury—the see of Peterborough being then vacant—to the church of Blisworth, in Northamptonshire. and it seems that on 31 July 1662 he was formally admitted to that rectory by Dr. Lant, bishop of Peterborough. He was admitted on 18 November 1663 to the rectory of St. Giles's-in-the-Fields, on the presentation of the king, and on 19 December 1667 he was installed as a prebendary of Westminster. He died a bachelor at Greenwich on 15 November 1675, and was buried there.

== Character ==
Boreman bore the character of a pious and learned divine. However, party feeling led him to make an utterly unfounded attack on the celebrated Richard Baxter, whom he charged in an anonymous work with being a "man of blood", for, addressing him, he wrote: "I must tell you in your ear what I have heard, and is commonly reported, that in the late wars you slew a man with your own hand in cold blood". Baxter was highly indignant at this false charge, and began to write an answer to Boreman's pamphlet, which he abandoned. He later answered Boreman in his True History of Councils (1682).

== Works ==
Boreman's works are:

- The Countrymans Catechisme, or the Churches Plea for Tithes. Wherein is plainly discovered the Duty and Dignity of Christs Ministers, and the Peoples Duty to them, London 1652, 4to.
- Paiedeiai thriambos. The Trivmph of Learning over Ignorance, and of Truth over Falsehood. Being an Answer to foure Quæries. Whether there be any need of Universities? Who is to be accounted an Hæretick? Whether it be lawfull to use Conventicles? Whether a Lay man may preach? Which were lately proposed by a Zelot, in the Parish Church at Swacie [Swavesey] neere Cambridge, London 1653, 4to. Reprinted in the Harleian Miscellany (1744), vol. i.
- The Triumph of Faith over Death. Or the Just Man's Memoriall; compris'd in a Panegyrick and Sermon, at the Funerall of the Religious, most Learned Dr. Combar, late Master of Trinity Colledge in Cambridge, and Deane of Carlile. Delivered in Trinity Colledge Chappell on 29 March 1653, London, 1654, 4to. Dedicated to William, earl of Portland.
- A Mirrovr of Mercy and Iudgement. Or an Exact true Narrative of the Life and Death of Freeman Sonds, Esquier, Sonne to Sir George Sonds of Lees Court in Shelwich in Kent. Who being about the age of 19, for Murthering his Elder Brother on Tuesday the 7th of August, was arraigned and condemned at Maidstone. Executed there on Tuesday the 21. of the same Moneth, 1655, London, 1655, 4to. Reprinted in ‘Authentic Memorials of Remarkable Occurrences and Affecting Calamities in the family of Sir George Sondes, Bart.’ Evesham [1790?], 12mo; also in the Harleian Miscellany, x. 23 (London 1813).
- An Antidote against Swearing. With an Appendix concerning our Academical Oaths, London 1662, 8vo.
- Autokatakritos: or Hypocrisie unvail'd, and Jesuitisme unmaskt. In a Letter to Mr. R. Baxter, by one that is a lover of Unity, Peace, and Concord, and his Well-wisher, London 1662, 4to.
- The Patern of Christianity: or the Picture of a true Christian. Presented at Northampton in a Sermon at a Visitation, May 12, 1663, London 1663, 4to.
- A Mirrour of Christianity, and a Miracle of Charity; or a true and exact Narrative of the Life and Death of the most virtuous Lady Alice Dutchess Duddeley, London 1669, 4to. Dedicated to Lady Katherine Leveson, relict of Sir Richard Leveson, bart., and only surviving daughter of the duchess.

Boreman published and dedicated to Edward Hyde, Earl of Clarendon 'The True Catholicks Tenure' (Cambridge, 1662), written by his friend Dr. Edward Hyde. Several specimens of his poetry are met with among the loyal effusions of the university of Cambridge before the troubled times of the English Civil Wars.
