= West Street Chapel =

Coordinates: 51°30′47″N 0°7′42″W

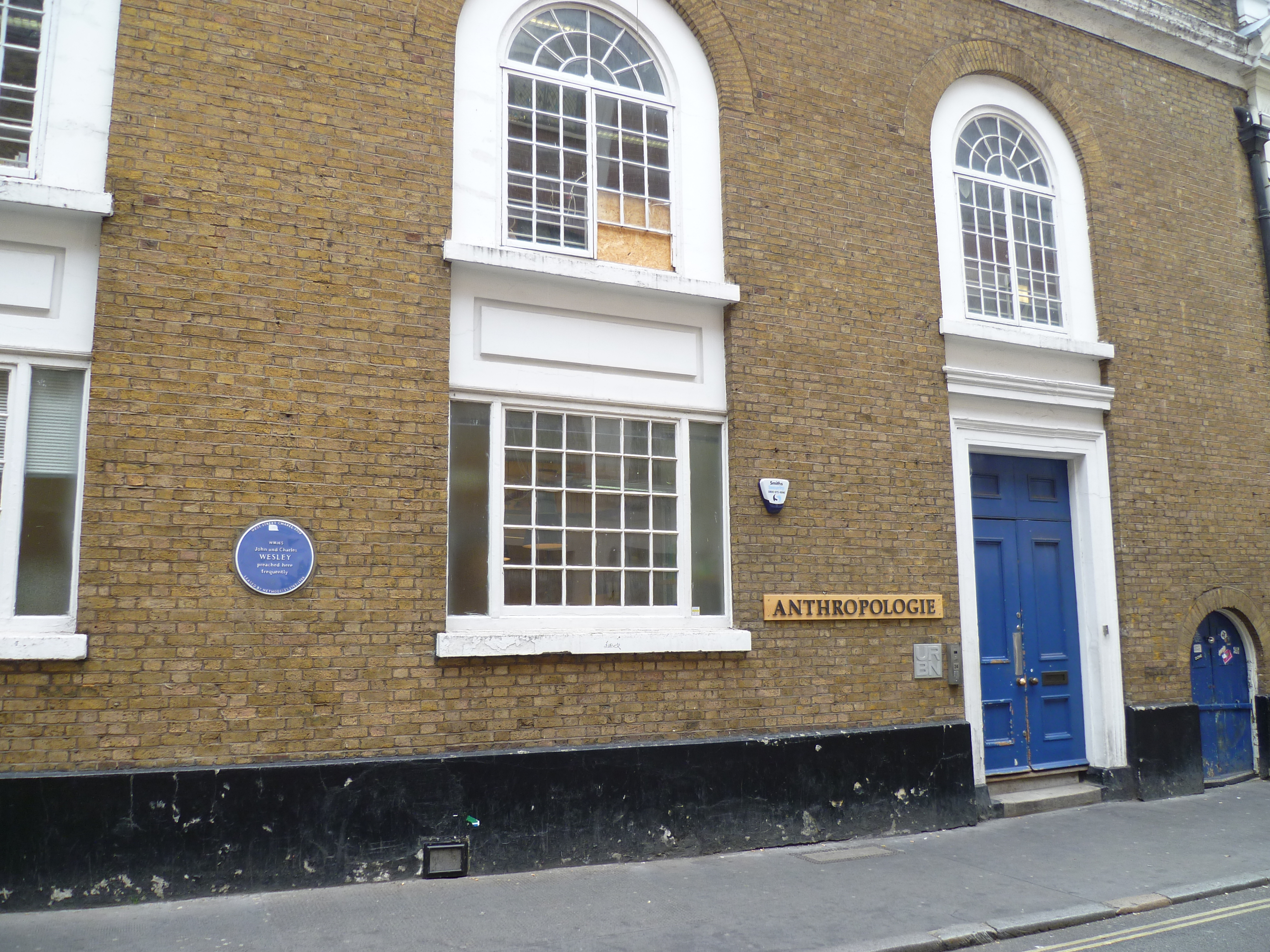
- West Street Chapel
- Location: 26 West Street, London WC2
- Country: England
- Denomination: Anglican
- Previous denomination: Methodist

History
- Status: closed

Architecture
- Years built: 1700

The West Street Chapel is a former chapel at 24 West Street, London WC2. It was John Wesley’s first Methodist chapel in London's West End.

== History ==
The chapel was built for a Huguenot congregation who has previously worshipped in Newport Market. They took possession of the building in 1700 and continued to use the chapel until 1743, when John Wesley took out a lease on the building. On Trinity Sunday of that year Wesley recorded in his Journal

I began officiating at the chapel in West Street, near the Seven Dials, of which, by a strange chain of providences, we have a lease for seven years. I preached on the Gospel for the day, part of the third chapter of St John; and afterwards administered the Lord's supper to some hundreds of communicants. I was a little afraid at first that my strength would not suffice for the business of the day, when a service of five hours (for it lasted from ten to three) was added to my usual employment. But God looked to that.

He was often assisted at the chapel by George Whitfield, and John William Fletcher preached his first sermon there in 1751.

From the beginning of the 19th century the chapel was used for Anglican worship. It is no longer used as a church but Wesley's association with the building is commemorated by a plaque. Its pulpit, used by John and Charles Wesley between 1741 and 1793, is now in the nearby church of St Giles in the Fields.

The former chapel has been listed Grade II on the National Heritage List for England since 1951.

== Sources ==
- Dibdin, R. W. (1862). The History of West Street Episcopal Chapel, London. James Nisbet and Co.
