= William Heywood =

William Heywood or Haywood (1599/1600–1663) was a Church of England clergyman who supported the Royalist cause in the English Civil War. He later became domestic chaplain to Archbishop William Laud, chaplain in ordinary to King Charles I, prebendary at St Paul's Cathedral and Rector of St Giles in the Fields church in London.

== Biography ==
=== Early life and education ===
Heywood was born in Bristol in 1600 to Mr William Heywood, a cooper. His brothers were Edmund, Thomas and Henry and his sister was named Mary.

Educated at Oxford he appears to have enjoyed early and easy success in the Church of England becoming successively domestic chaplain to Archbishop William Laud, chaplain in ordinary to Charles I and a prebendary at St Paul's Cathedral before being appointed by Laud to the rectory of St Giles in the Fields in London.

=== Rector of St Giles in the Fields and Civil War ===
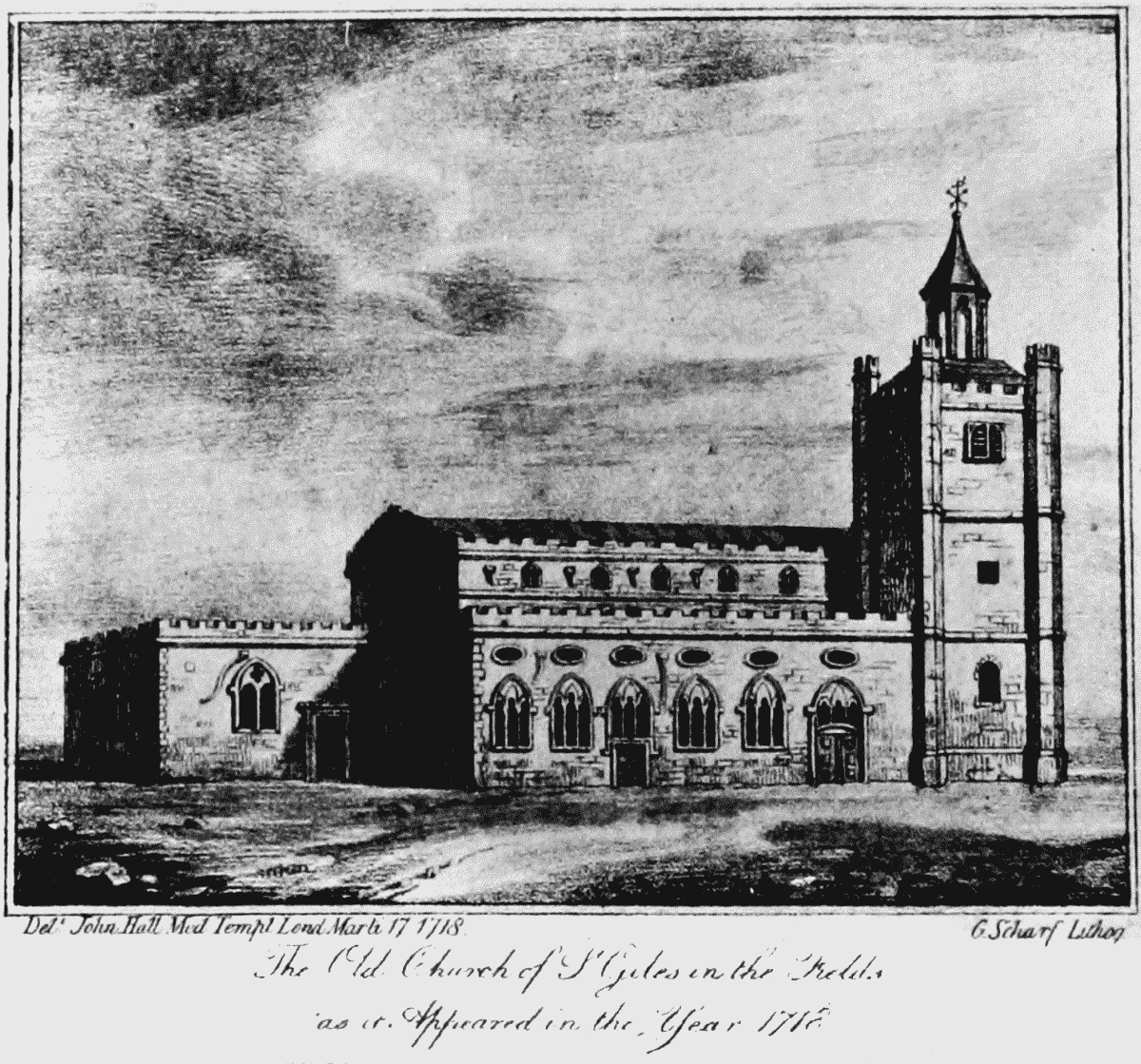
St Giles in The Fields Church

During his time at St Giles Heywood became intractably embroiled in the religious controversy over ritualism that was emerging in the Church of England.

Heywood, under Laud's patronage, began to ornament and decorate St Giles in the High Church (Laudian) fashion and to alter the ceremonial of the sacraments. This provoked a faction of the Protestant parishioners of St Giles to present Parliament with a petition listing and enumerating the 'popish reliques' with which Heywood had introduced 'at needless expense to the parish' as well as the 'Superstitious and Idolatrous manner of administration of the Sacrament of the Lords Supper'. The offending ceremonial was closely described by the parishioners in their complaint to parliament:

They [the Clergy] enter into the Sanctum Sanctorum in which place they reade their second Service, and it is divided into three parts, which is acted by them all three, with change of place, and many duckings before the Altar, with divers Tones in their Voyces, high and low, with many strange actions by their hands, now up then downe, This being ended, the Doctor takes the Cups from the Altar and delivers them to one of the Subdeacons who placeth' them upon a side Table, Then the Doctor kneeleth to the Altar, but what he doth we know not, nor what hee meaneth by it. . .

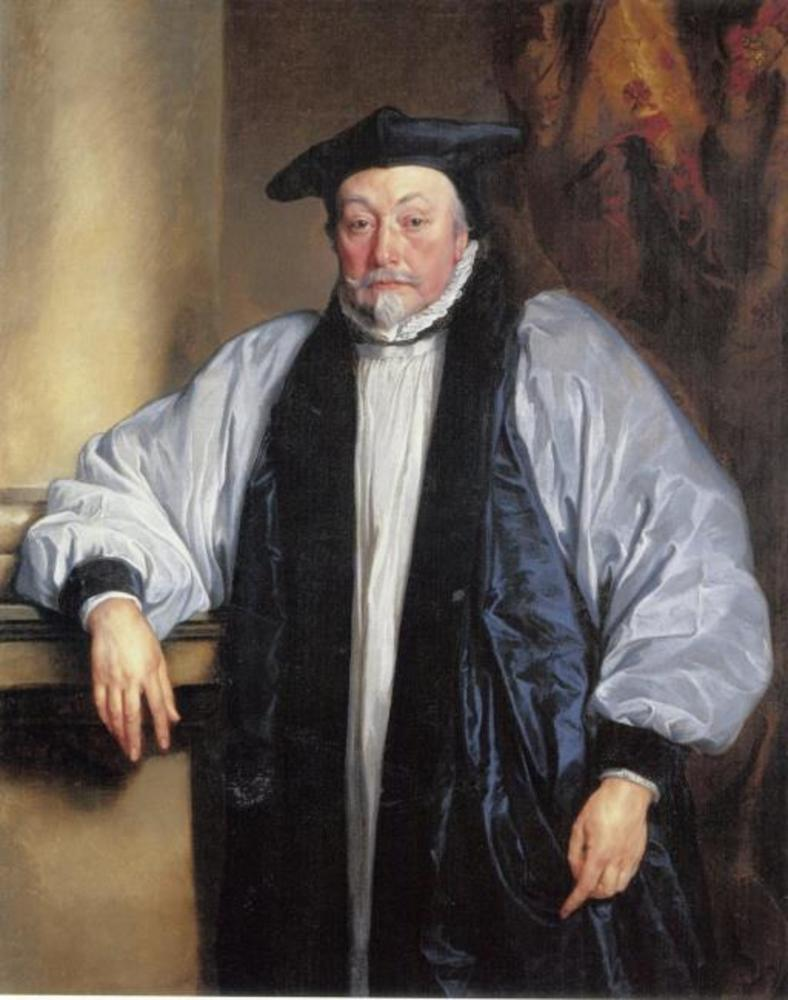
Archbishop William Laud, Heywood's ecclesiastical patron

At this time the interior of the church was overhauled by Heywood and provided with numerous ornaments including an elaborate screen of carved oak. This, as described in the petition to Parliament in 1640, was "in the figure of a beautiful gate, in which is carved two large pillars, and three large statues: on the one side is Paul, with his sword; on the other Barnabas, with his book; and over them Peter with his keyes. They are all set above with winged cherubims, and beneath supported by lions". Elaborate and expensive altar rails were installed to separate the altar from congregation, extending the full width of the chancel, while the altar stood close up to the east wall and was paved with marble.

The result of the parishioners angry petition to Parliament was that most of the ornaments were stripped and sold in 1643.

Dr Heywood remained the incumbent of St Giles at the time of the outbreak of the Great Rebellion in 1642. His association with Archbishop Laud (later executed on the 10 January 1645) marked him out for special attention and after the murder of the King and the establishment of the Commonwealth he was imprisoned and suffered many hardships. Heywood was eventually forced to flee London, residing in Wiltshire until the Restoration of the monarchy in 1660 when he was finally re-instated to the living of St Giles.

=== Restoration and death and burial ===
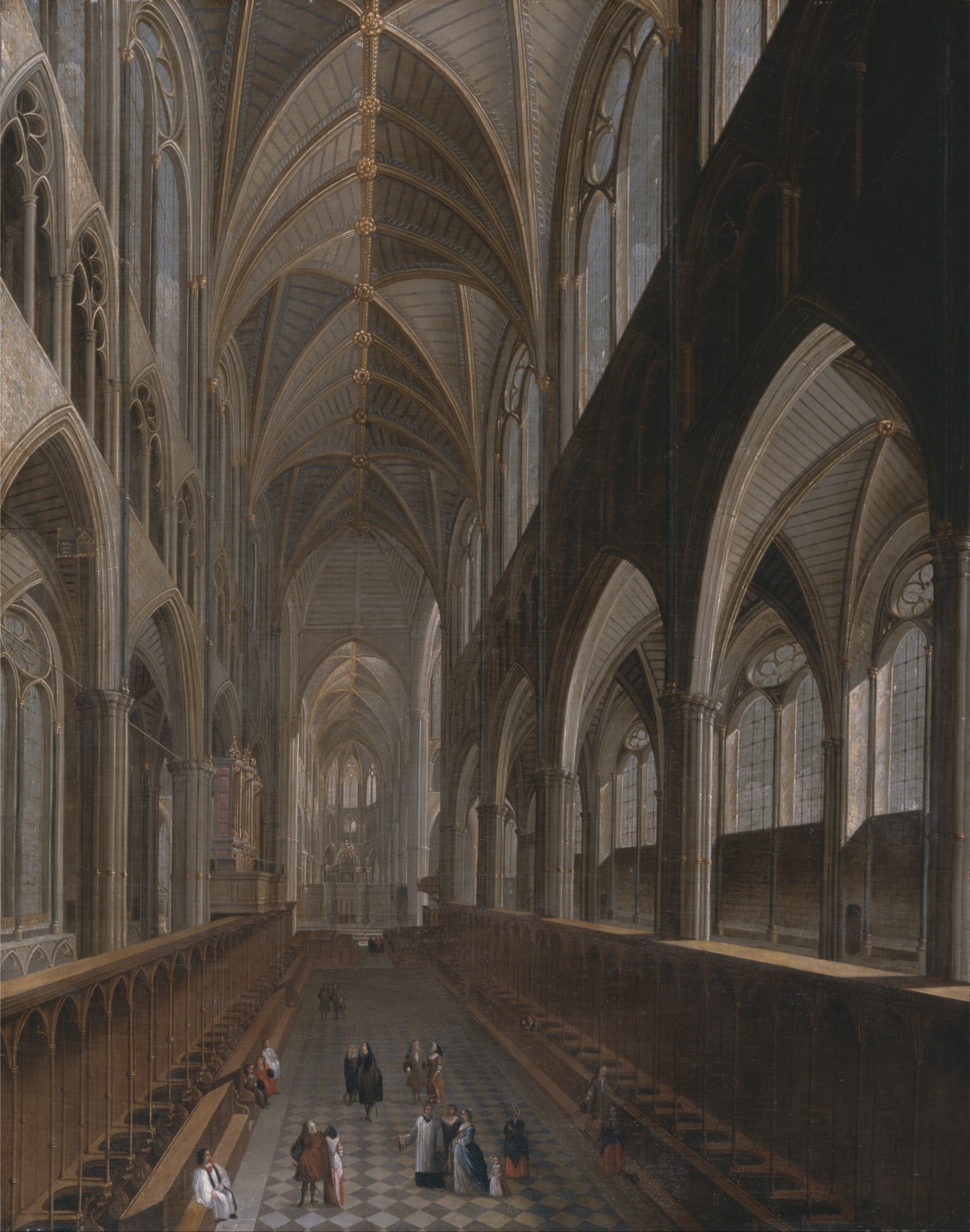
Westminster Abbey Nave

Heywood lived just long enough to enjoy the return of his own and his Sovereign's fortunes. After the Restoration of the monarchy in 1660 Heywood was re-instated at Westminster and returned to the Rectory of St Giles. He lived three more years, succumbing in 1663, and was buried at the foot of the pulpit in Westminster Abbey on 17 July 1663.

His wife Alice (Manning) was buried with him on 10 November 1675. Their son John was baptised at St Giles in 1639 died and was buried not long after his father on 2 March 1664.
