= St Giles in the Fields =

London church

St Giles-in-the-Fields
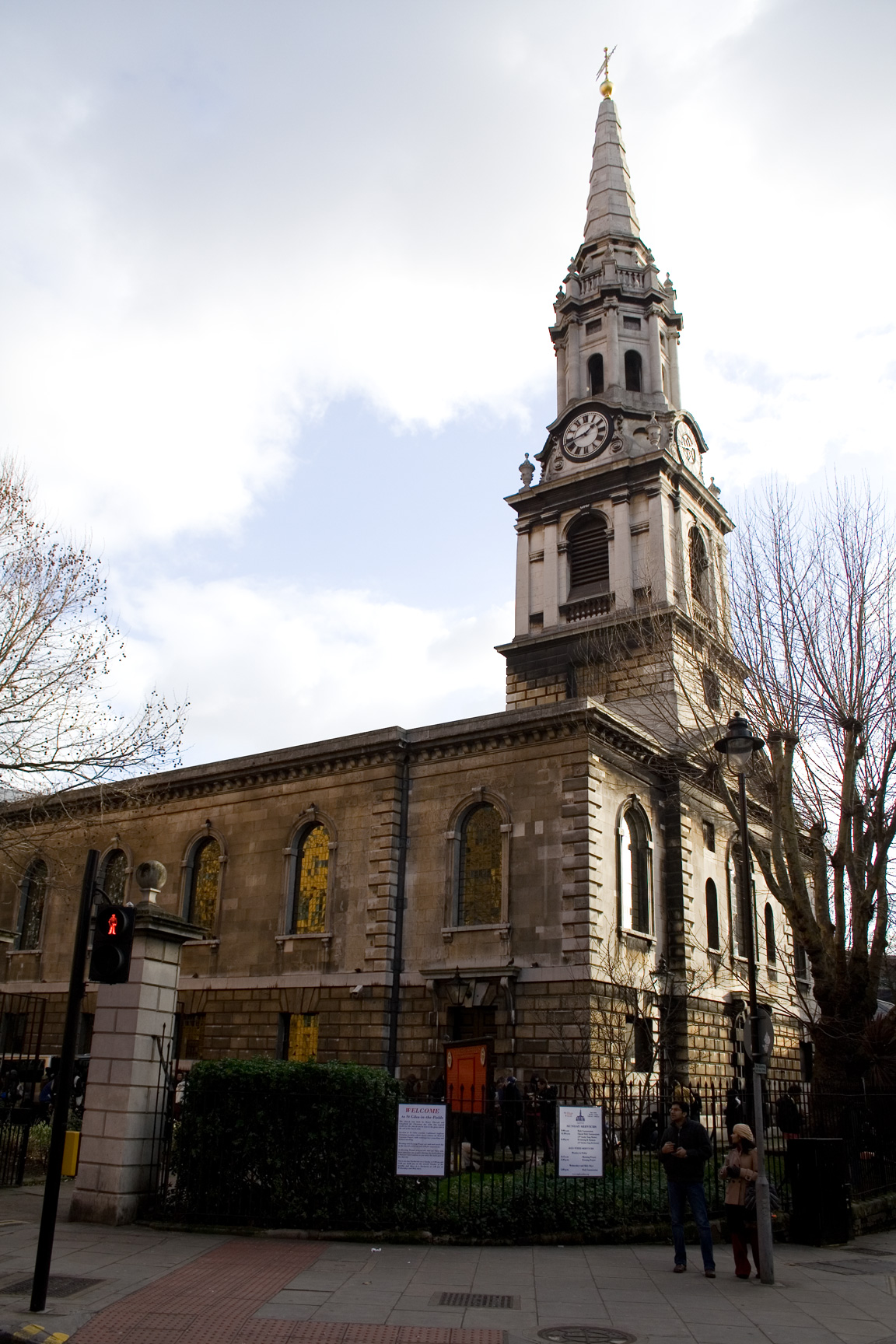
- Church of St Giles-in-the-Fields, London
- St Giles-in-the-Fields
- 51°30′55.12″N 00°07′43.08″W
- OS grid reference: TQ 29963 81260
- Location: St Giles High Street, London, WC2H 8LG
- Country: England
- Denomination: Church of England
- Churchmanship: Traditional Anglican; Book of Common Prayer
- Website: www.stgilesonline.org

History
- Founded: 1101

Architecture
- Heritage designation: Grade I
- Architect: Henry Flitcroft
- Style: Palladian
- Years built: 1731–1733

Administration
- Diocese: Diocese of London
- Archdeaconry: Charing Cross
- Deanery: Westminster St Margaret

Clergy
- Rector: Reverend Thomas Sander

St Giles-in-the-Fields is the Anglican parish church of the St Giles district of London. The parish stands within the London Borough of Camden and forms part of the Diocese of London. The church, named for St Giles the Hermit, began as the chapel of a 12th-century monastery and leper hospital in the fields between Westminster and the City of London and now gives its name to the surrounding urban district of St Giles in the West End of London, situated between Seven Dials, Bloomsbury, Holborn and Soho. The present church is the third on the site since 1101 and was rebuilt most recently in 1731–1733 in Palladian style to designs by the architect Henry Flitcroft.

== History ==
=== 12th–16th centuries ===
==== Hospital and chapel ====
The first recorded church on the site was a chapel of the Parish of Holborn attached to a monastery and leper hospital founded by Matilda of Scotland, "Good Queen Maud", consort of Henry I between the years 1101 and 1109. The foundation would later become attached as a "cell," or subordinate house, to the larger Hospital of the Lazar Brothers at Burton Lazars, in Leicestershire. At the time of its founding it stood well outside the City of London and distant from the Royal Palace of Westminster, on the main road to Tyburn and Oxford. Between 1169 and 1189, on Michaelmas, Henry II granted the Hospital the lands, gifts and privileges that were to secure its future. For this he has been credited as a 'second founder'.

The chapel probably began to function as the church of a hamlet that grew up round the hospital. Although there is no record of any presentation to the living before the hospital was suppressed in 1539, the fact that the parish of St. Giles was in existence at least as early as 1222 means that the church was at least partially used for parochial purposes from that time.

The Precinct of the Hospital probably included the whole of the island site now bounded by High Street, Charing Cross Road and Shaftesbury Avenue. As well as the Hospital church which stood on the site of the present St Giles there would have been other buildings connected to the hospital including the Master's House (subsequently called the Mansion House) to the west of the church, and the 'Spittle Houses', dwellings attached to the hospital on the eastern end of the present churchyard including the Angel Inn, which remains on the same site.

St Giles's position halfway between the ancient cities of Westminster and London is perhaps no coincidence. As George Walter Thornbury noted in London Old & New "it is remarkable that in almost every ancient town in England, the church of St. Giles stands either outside the walls, or, at all events, near its outlying parts, in allusion, doubtless, to the arrangements of the Israelites of old, who placed their lepers outside the camp."

==== Under the Lazar brothers ====
During the 13th century a Papal Bull confirmed the hospital's privileges and granted it special protection under the See of Rome. The Papal Bull reveals that the lepers were trying to live as a religious community and that the Hospital precinct included gardens and eight acres of land adjoining the hospital to the north and south. The hospital was supported by the Crown and administered by the City of London for its first 200 years, being known as a Royal Peculiar.

In 1299, Edward I assigned it to Hospital of Burton Lazars in Leicestershire, a house of the order of St. Lazarus of Jerusalem, a chivalric order from the era of the Crusades. The 14th century was turbulent for the hospital, with frequent accusations of corruption and mismanagement from the City and Crown authorities and suggestions that members of the Order of Saint Lazarus (known as Lazar brothers) put the affairs of the monastery ahead of caring for the lepers. In 1348 The Citizens contended to the King that since the Master and brothers of Burton Lazars had taken over St. Giles's the friars had ousted the lepers and replaced them by brothers and sisters of the Order of St. Lazarus, who were not diseased and ought not to associate with those who were. The Hospital appears to have been governed by a Warden, who was subordinate to the Master of Burton Lazars. The King intervened on several occasions and appointed a new head of the hospital.

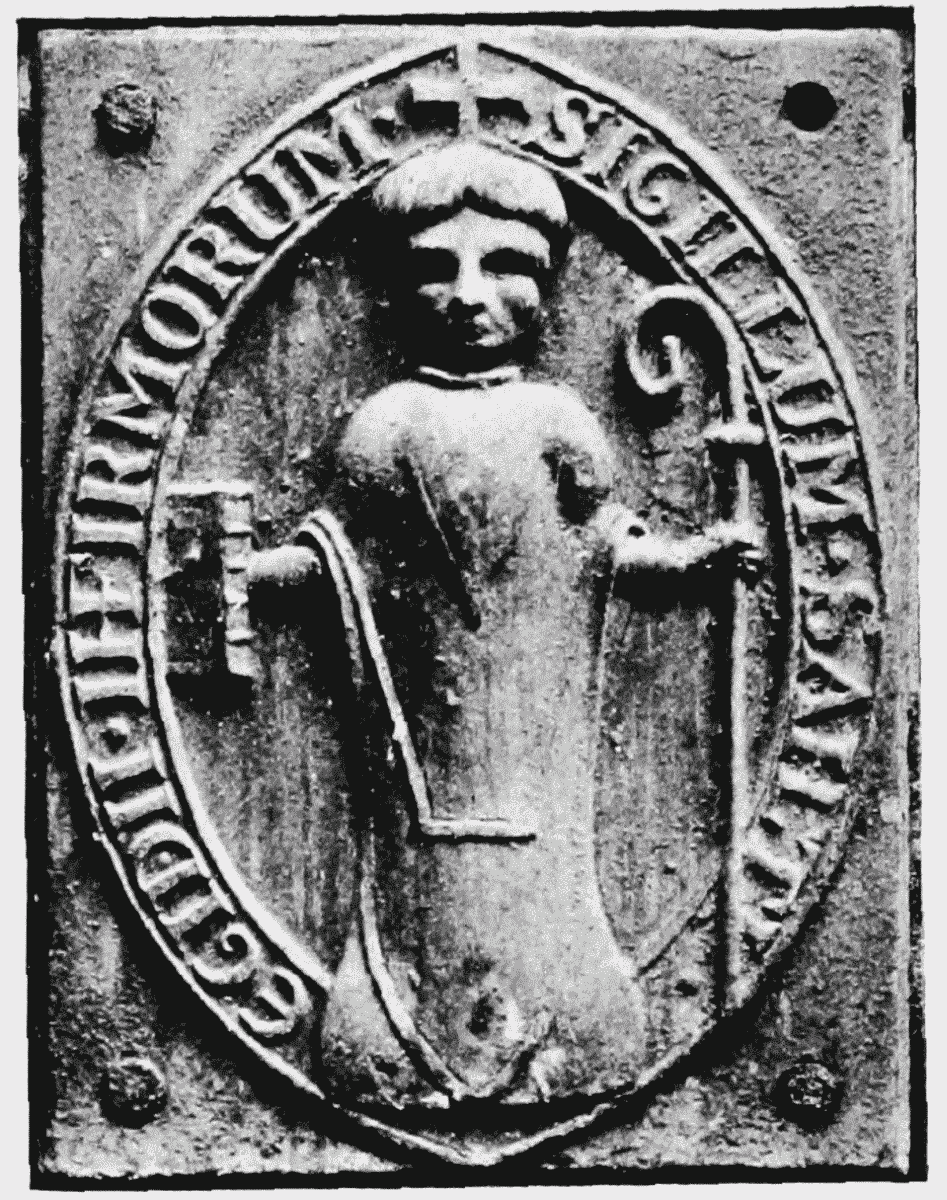
The seal of the Monastery and Hospital of St Giles.

Eventually, in 1391, Richard II sold the hospital, chapel and lands to the Cistercian abbey of St Mary de Graces by the Tower of London. This was opposed by the Lazars and their new Master, Walter Lynton, who responded by leading a group of armed men to St Giles, recapturing it by force and by the City of London, which withheld rent money in protest. During this occupation the Order of St Lazarus opposed with armed force a visitation by the Archbishop of Canterbury and many important documents and records were lost or destroyed. The dispute was finally settled peacefully in court with the King claiming he had been misled about the ownership of St Giles and recognising Lynton as legal 'Master of St Giles Hospital' and the Hospital of Burton Lazarus with the Cistercian sale being formally revoked in 1402 and the property returned to the Lazar Brothers.

The property at the time included 8 acres (32,000 m^{2}) of farmland and a survey-enumerated eight horses, twelve oxen, two cows, 156 pigs, 60 geese and 186 domestic fowl. Lepers were cared for there until the mid-16th century, when the disease abated and the monastery took to caring for indigents instead.

The Precinct of the Hospital probably included the whole of the site now bounded by St Giles High Street, Charing Cross Road and Shaftesbury Avenue; it was entered by a Gatehouse in St Giles High Street.

==== Lollardy and Oldcastle's Rising ====
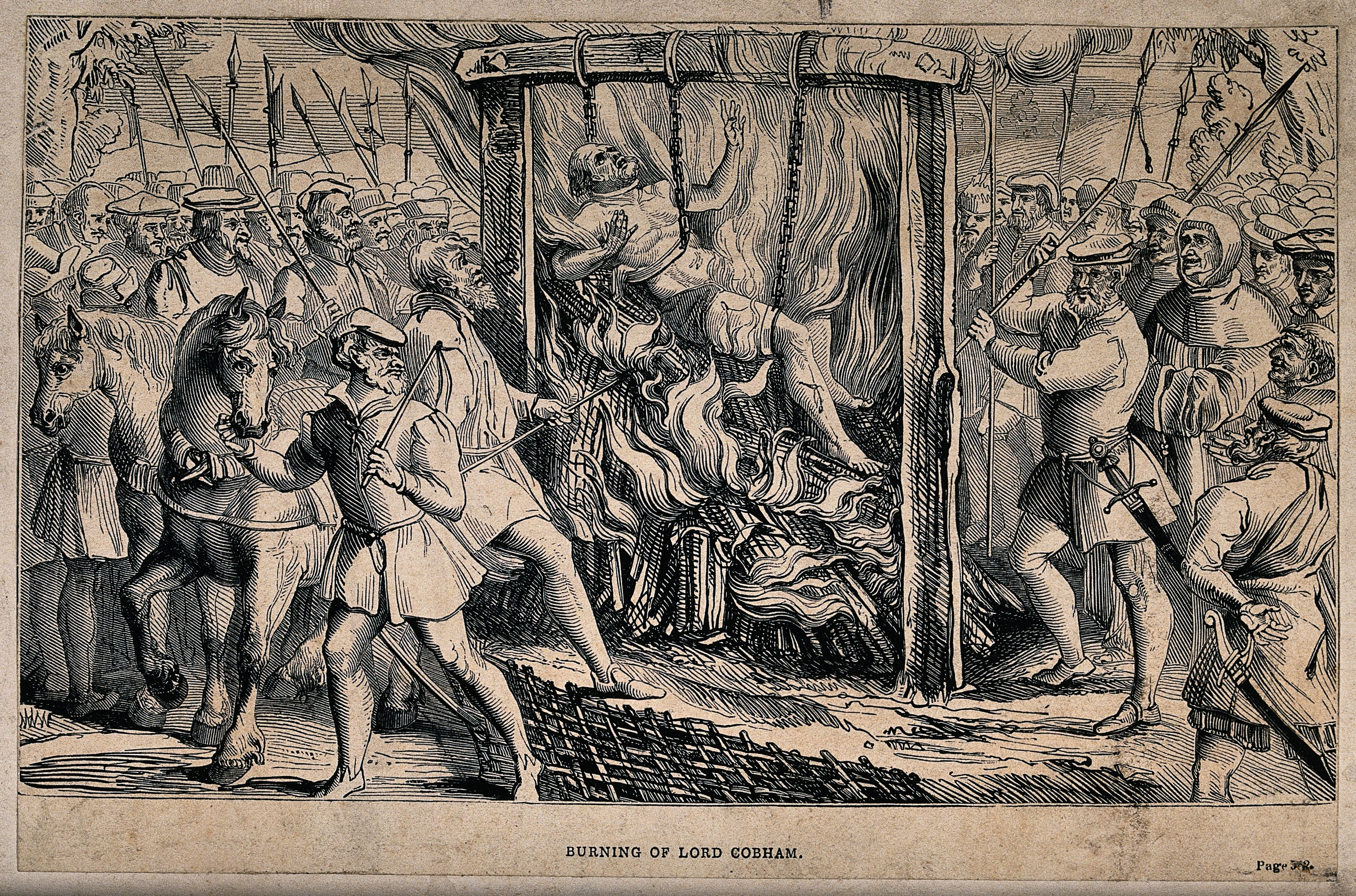
The burning of Sir John Oldcastle in St Giles Fields 1417.

In 1414, St Giles Fields served as the centre of Sir John Oldcastle's abortive proto-Protestant Lollard uprising directed against the Catholic Church and the English king Henry V. In anticipation of Protestantism, Lollard beliefs were outlined in the 1395 The Twelve Conclusions of the Lollards which dealt with, among other things, their opposition to capital punishment, rejection of religious celibacy and belief that members of the clergy should be held accountable to civil laws. Rebel Lollards answered a summons to assemble among the 'dark thickets' by St. Giles's Fields on the night of Jan. 9, 1414. The King, however, was forewarned by his agents and the small group of Lollards in assembly were captured or dispersed. The rebellion brought severe reprisals and marked the end of the Lollards' overt political influence after many of the captured rebels were brutally executed. Of their number, 38 were dragged on hurdles through the streets from Newgate to St Giles on January 12 and hanged side by side in batches of four while the bodies of the seven who had been formally condemned as heretics by the Catholic Church were burned afterwards. Four more were hanged a week later. Finally, on 14 December 1417 Sir John Oldcastle himself was hanged in chains and burnt 'gallows and all' in St Giles Fields.

The famous scene of the meeting of the Lollards at St Giles Fields was later memorialised by Lord Tennyson in his poem Sir John Oldcastle, Lord Cobham:

What did he say,
My frighted Wiclif-preacher whom I crost
In flying hither? that one night a crowd
Throng'd the waste field about the city gates:
The king was on them suddenly with a host.
Why there? they came to hear their preacher.

=== 16th century dissolution and decay. ===
==== Dissolution of the Hospital of St Giles and the first parish church ====
Under the reign Henry VIII, in 1536, the hospital's ownership of certain parcels of land was disputed by the King's commissioners and as a result it was stripped of almost all the lands gifted by parishioners and benefactors since its foundation. This included over 45 acres of St Giles Parish itself and the avowdson of the ancient parish of St Dunstan's Feltham, which was among the earliest gifts to the Hospital which were all handed over to the Crown. All this, however, merely anticipated the momentous events of 1544 when the entire hospital, along with the Hospital of Burton St Lazar, was finally dissolved with all the Hospital lands, rights and privileges, excluding the chapel, being granted to the king John Dudley, Lord Lisle in 1548. The chapel survived as the local parish church, the first Rector of St Giles being appointed in 1547 when the phrase "in the fields" was first added to the name to distinguish it from St Giles Cripplegate.

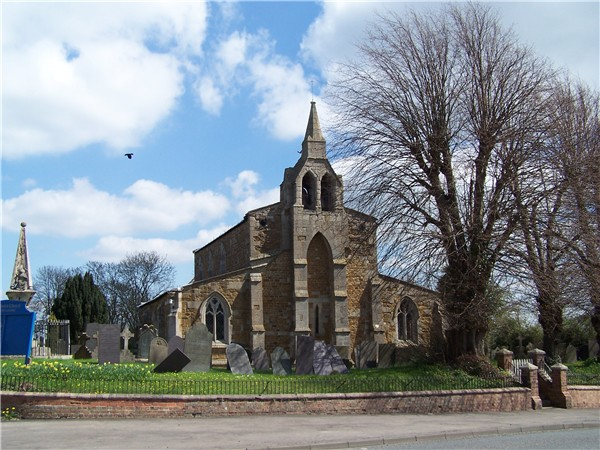
St James's Church, Burton Lazars

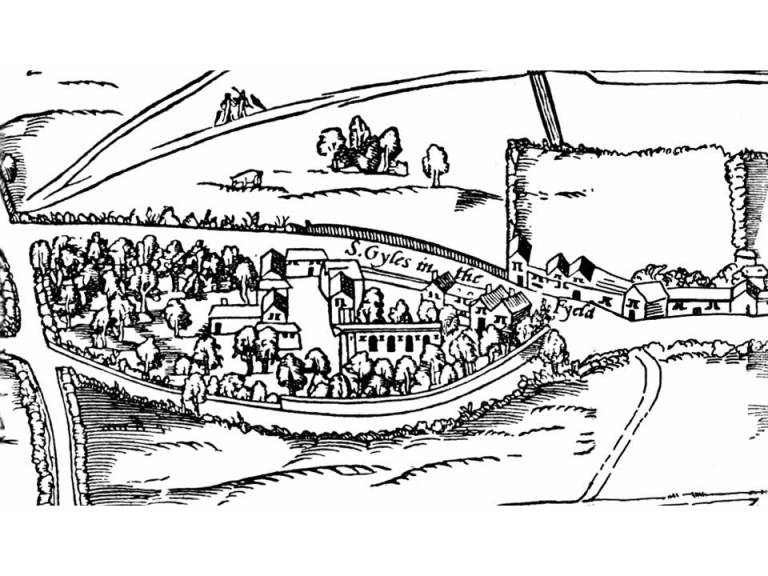
A reconstructed image of St Giles church in its late medieval setting

Perhaps nothing remains of the medieval church of St Giles however we can reconstruct something of its appearance from the historical record.

According to an order of the Vestry of 8 August 1623, the medieval parish church stood 153 feet by 65 feet and consisted of a nave and a chancel, both with pillars and clerestory walls above and with aisles on either side. in the 46th year of Henry III or 1262 there is a record of a bequest by Robert of Portpool to the Hospital chapel providing for the maintenance of a chaplain "to celebrate perpetually divine service in the chapel of St. Michael within the hospital church of S. Giles.". Thus we may surmise that the church building was of a tripartite structure likely consisting of side aisles supported on rounded Norman arches and lit by clerestory windows above, leading to separate chapels dedicated to St Michael and St Giles on either side of the central nave which lead to a chancel separated from the body of the church by a rood screen.

There is a further indication, in the Vestry minutes of 21 April 1617, that there was a sort of round tower, spirelet or conical bell turret at the western end of the structure.

Intriguingly, the other remaining medieval relic of the order of St. Lazarus of Jerusalem in England, the 12th-century Church of St James, which now serves as the parish church of Burton Lazars, Leicestershire, appears quite closely to resemble the description of what St Giles may have looked like in its medieval state.

==== The Babington Plot ====
140 years after Oldcastle's rising, St Giles was the scene of another act of public treason when it played host to the Babington Plot.

The issuance of the papal bull Regnans in Excelsis by Pope Pius V on 25 February 1570 had granted English Catholics licence to overthrow the Protestant English queen and in 1585 a cell of recusants, crypto-Catholics and Jesuit priests hatched a plan in the precincts of St Giles to murder Queen Elizabeth I and invite a Spanish invasion of England with the purpose of replacing her with Catholic Queen Mary.

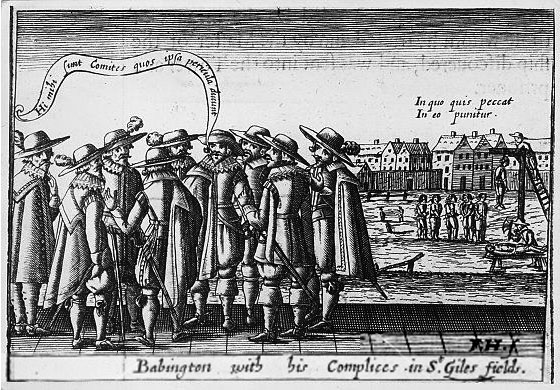
Babington with his accomplices in St Giles's Fields

The chief conspirators in the plot were Anthony Babington and John Ballard. Babington, a young gentleman of Derbyshire, was recruited by Ballard, a Jesuit priest and Roman Catholic missionary who hoped to do away with the 'heretic' Queen Elizabeth and rescue the Scottish Queen Mary from her imprisonment at Fotheringhay Castle.

The plot was quickly uncovered by Queen Elizabeth's spymaster Francis Walsingham and used by him as a means to entrap Mary. The plan was conceived in talks in held at St Giles's Fields and the taverns of the parish and thus, when the plot was finally exposed, the conspirators were returned to St Giles churchyard to be hanged, drawn, and quartered.

Ballard and Babington were executed on 20 September 1586 along with the other men who had been tried with them. Such was the public outcry at the horror of their execution that Elizabeth changed the order for the second group to be allowed to hang until "quite dead" before disembowelling and quartering.

The fact that Babington had solicited a letter from Mary Queen of Scots expressing tacit approval for the plot led to her execution on 8 February 1587.

The exposure of the plot and the role of the Catholic church in fomenting rebellion was to stoke anti-Catholic reaction in the century to come.

=== 17th century, Civil War, Restoration and Plague. ===
==== Duchess Dudley's church ====
By the second decade of the 17th century, the medieval church had suffered a series of collapses, and the parishioners decided to erect a new church, which was begun 1623 and completed in 1630. It was consecrated on 26 January 1630. mostly paid for by the Duchess of Dudley, wife of Sir Robert Dudley. The 'poor players of The Cockpit theatre' were also said to have contributed a sum of £20 towards the new church building. The new church was handsomely appointed and sumptuously furnished. 123 feet long and the breadth 57 wide with a steeple in rubbed brick, galleries adorning the north and south aisles with a great east window of coloured and painted glass.

The new building was consecrated by William Laud, Bishop of London. An illuminated list of subscribers to the rebuilding is still kept in the church.

==== Civil War and sectarian conflict ====
The ruptures in church and state which would eventually lead to the Civil War were felt early in St Giles Parish. In 1628 the first rector of the newly consecrated church, Roger Maynwaring was fined and deprived of his clerical functions by order of Parliament after two sermons, given on 4 May, which were considered to have impugned the rights of Parliament and advocated for the Divine Right of the Stuart Kings.

The controversy would be continued into the 1630s when Archbishop Laud's former chaplain, William Heywood, was installed as Rector. It was Heywood, under Laud's patronage, who began to ornament and decorate St Giles in the High Church, Laudian fashion and to alter the ceremonial of the sacraments. This provoked the Protestant (particularly Puritan) parishioners of St Giles to present Parliament with a petition listing and enumerating the 'popish reliques' with which Heywood had set up 'at needless expense to the parish' as well as the 'Superstitious and Idolatrous manner of administration of the Sacrament of the Lords Supper'. The offending ceremonial was closely described by the parishioners in their complaint to parliament:

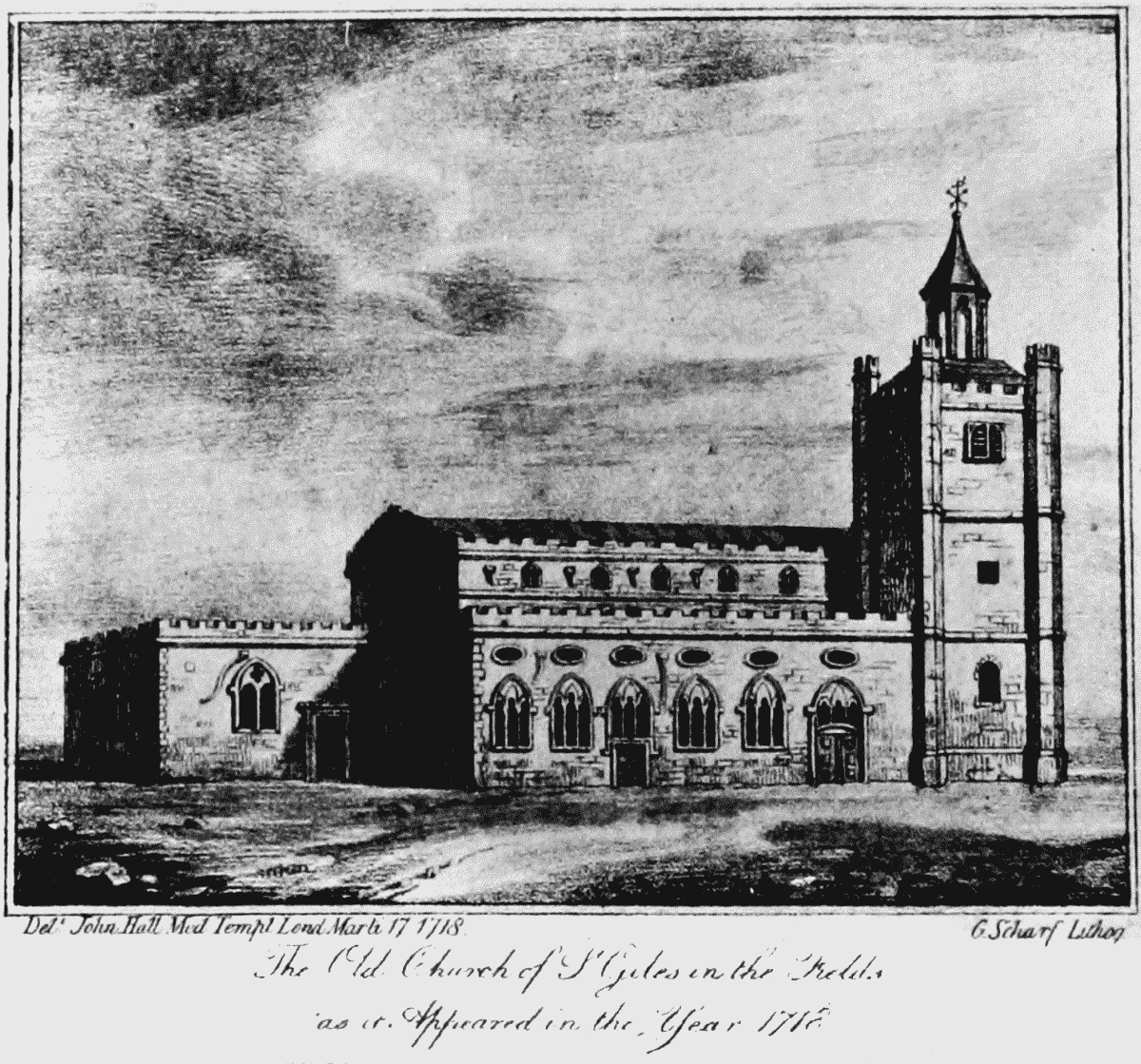
St Giles in the Fields Church in the 17th century

"They [the Clergy] enter into the Sanctum Sanctorum in which place they reade their second Service, and it is divided into three parts, which is acted by them all three, with change of place, and many duckings before the Altar, with divers Tones in their Voyces, high and low, with many strange actions by their hands, now up then downe, This being ended, the Doctor takes the Cups from the Altar and delivers them to one of the Subdeacons who placeth' them upon a side Table, Then the Doctor kneeleth to the Altar, but what he doth we know not, nor what hee meaneth by it. . .

At this time the interior was heavily furnished by Heywood and provided with numerous ornaments, many of which were the gift of Alice Dudley, Duchess of Dudley. Chief among them was an elaborate screen of carved oak placed where one had formerly stood in the medieval church. This, as described in the petition to Parliament in 1640, was "in the figure of a beautiful gate, in which is carved two large pillars, and three large statues: on the one side is Paul, with his sword; on the other Barnabas, with his book; and over them Peter with his keyes. They are all set above with winged cherubims, and beneath supported by lions."Elaborate and expensive altar rails would have separated the altar from congregation. This ornamental balustrade extended the full width of the chancel and stood 7 or 8 feet east of the screen at the top of three steps while the altar stood close up to the east wall paved with marble.

The result of the parishioners' petition to Parliament was that most of the ornaments were stripped and sold in 1643, while Lady Dudley was still alive.

Dr Heywood was still the incumbent at the time of the outbreak of the English Civil War in 1642. As well as Rector of St Giles he had, of course, been a domestic chaplain to Archbishop Laud, chaplain in ordinary to King Charles I and prebendary at St Paul's Cathedral. All this marked him out for special attention after the execution of the King and during the Commonwealth period he was imprisoned and suffered many hardships. Heywood was forced to flee London, residing in Wiltshire until the Restoration of the monarchy in 1660 when he was finally re-instated to the living of St Giles.

In 1645 the parish notes record the erection of a copy of the Solemn League and Covenant in the nave of the church and in 1650, a year after the execution of the King, with the fall of the monarchy seemingly irreversibly settled, an order was given for the 'taking down of the Kings Arms' in the church and the clear-glazing of the windows in the nave.

Following the interregnum, in 1660, Charles II was rapturously received back into London and the bells of St Giles were pealed for three days. Royalism was at its highest pitch. William Heywood was reinstated to his living at St Giles for a short period before being succeeded by the Dr Robert Boreman, previously Clerk of the Green Cloth to Charles I and a fellow deprived Royalist. Revd. Boreman is remembered best for his bitter exchange with Richard Baxter the Nonconformist leader and occasional parishioner of St Giles.

==== Revd. John Sharp and the Glorious Revolution ====
In 1675 Dr. John Sharp was appointed to the position of Rector by the influence and patronage of Heneage Finch, 1st Earl of Nottingham and Lord Keeper of the Great Seal. Sharp's father had been a prominent Bradfordian puritan who enjoyed the favour of Thomas Fairfax and inculcated him in Calvinist, Low Church, doctrines, while his mother, being strong Royalist, instructed him in the liturgy of the Book of Common Prayer. Thus he could be seen as bridging the divide within the reformed religion in England.

Sharp became deeply committed to his ministry at St Giles and indeed later declined the more profitable benefice of St Martin in the Fields so as to continue ministering to the poor and turbulent parish of St Giles.

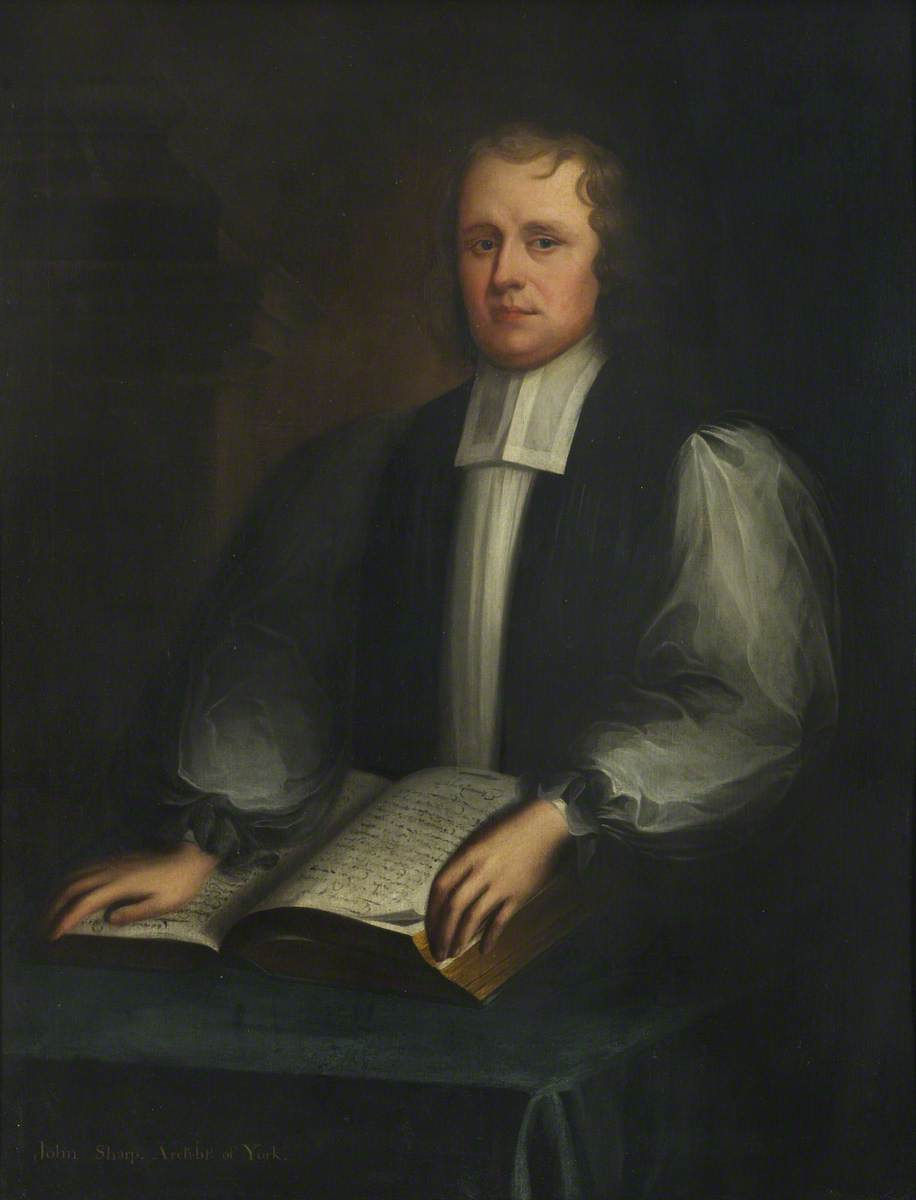
Revd. (later Archbishop) John Sharp. Rector during the Glorious Revolution

The Rector would spend the next sixteen years reforming and reconstituting the parish from the disorder of the post-civil-war period. He preached regularly (at least twice every Sunday at St Giles as well as weekly in other city churches) and with "much fluency, piety [and] gravity", becoming, according to Bishop Burnet "one of the most popular preachers of the age". Sharp completely re-ordered the system of worship at St Giles around the Established Liturgy of the Book Of Common Prayer, a liturgy he considered "almost perfectly designed". He instituted, perhaps for the first time, a weekly Holy Communion and restored the Daily Offices in the church. Sharp also insisted upon communicants kneeling to receive communion.

In the wider parish he was constant in his catechising of young people and in performing visitations of the sick, often at the hazard of his own life. Somehow he avoided serious illness despite "bear[ing] his share of duty among the cellars and the garrets" of a district already synonymous with plague and sickness. Indeed, his solicitude for his parishioners left him at risk in many ways. He once survived an attempted assassination by Jacobite agents constructed around the pretense of luring him to visit a dying parishioner. He attended with an armed servant and the "parishioner" staged an "instant recovery".

In 1685 Sharp was tasked by the Lord Mayor with drawing up for the Grand Jury of London their address of congratulations on the accession of James II and on 20 April 1686 he became chaplain in ordinary to the King. However, provoked by the subversion of his parishioners' faith by Jesuit priests and Jacobite agents, Sharp preached two sermons at St. Giles on 2 and 9 May, which were held to reflect adversely on the King's religious policy. As a result, Henry Compton, bishop of London, was ordered by the Lord President of the Council, to summarily suspend Sharp from his position at St Giles. Compton refused, but in an interview at Doctors' Commons on 18 May privately advised Sharp to "forbear the pulpit" for the present. On 1 July, by the advice of Judge Jeffreys, he left London for Norwich; but when he returned to London in December his petition, revised by Jeffreys, was received, and in January 1687 he was reinstated.

In August 1688 Sharp was again in trouble. After refusing to read the declaration of indulgence he summoned before the ecclesiastical commission of James II. He argued that though obedience was due to the king in preference to the archbishop, yet that obedience went no further than what was legal and honest. After the Glorious Revolution he visited the imprisoned 'Bloody' Jeffreys in the Tower of London and attempted to bring him to penitence and consolation for his crimes.

Soon after the Revolution Sharp preached before the Prince of Orange (soon to be King William III) and three days later before the Convention Parliament. On each occasion he included prayers for King James II on the ground that the lords had not yet concurred in the abdication. On 7 September 1689 he was named dean of Canterbury succeeding John Tillotson. He was installed as Archbishopric of York in 1691.

==== The Great Plague in St Giles ====
The Bubonic Plague or Black Death had first appeared in London in 1348 and persisted recurrently for the next 318 years with the outbreaks of 1362, 1369, 1471, 1479 proving particularly severe.

St.Giles's parish enjoys the unfortunate distinction of having originated last and most severe instance of the plague in London, between 1665 and 1666, a period that has become known as the Great Plague of London. Daniel Defoe records that the first persons to catch the disease were members of a family living at the top of Drury Lane, 350 yards from the St Giles church. Two Frenchmen staying with a local family caught ill of the plague there and quickly died:

...the latter end of November or the beginning of December 1664 when two men, said to be Frenchmen, died of the plague in Long Acre, or rather at the upper end of Drury Lane

By 7 June 1665 the diarist Samuel Pepys noticed in the parish of St Giles, for the first time, the dreaded scarlet Plague Cross painted on the doors of the dead and dying:

I did in Drury-lane see two or three houses marked with a red cross upon the doors, and "Lord have mercy upon us" writ there - which was a sad sight to me, being the first of that kind that to my remembrance I ever saw.

By September 1665, 8,000 people were dying a week in London and by the end of the plague year it had claimed an estimated 100,000 people—almost a quarter of London's population, in 18 months.

By the end of the plague there had been a total 3,216 listed plague deaths in a St Giles parish which had fewer than 2,000 listed households. This is almost certainly an underestimate, however, as the non-reporting of deaths to avoid quarantine measures was widespread. By the end of 1666 the mortal remains of over 1000 parishioners had been deposited in the plague pit in St Giles churchyard with many other corpses being sent to pits at Golden Square and a site which is now at the corner of Marshall Street and Beak Street in Soho.

=== 18th–19th centuries, rebuilding and urban expansion ===
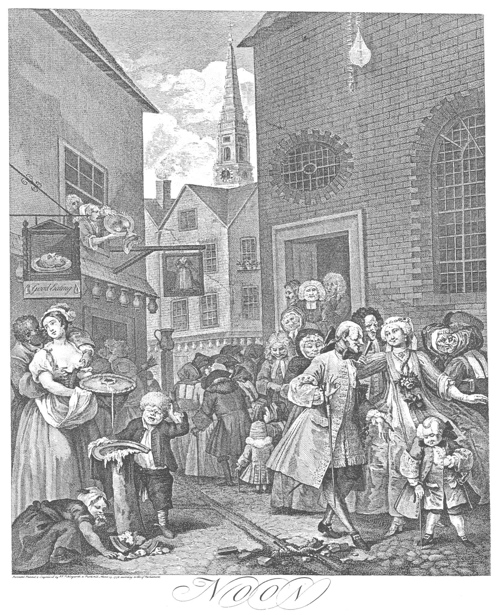
Hogarth's Noon from Four Times of the Day, a 1738 engraving showing the church in the background

==== The Henry Flitcroft church ====
Saint Giles in the Fields Rebuilding Act 1717
- Act of Parliament
- Parliament of Great Britain
- Long title: An act to impower the commissioners appointed to put in execution the acts of the ninth and tenth years of her late Majesty's reign, for building fifty new churches in and about the cities of London and Westminfter, and suburbs thereof, to direct the parish church of St. Giles in the Fields in the county of Middlesex to be rebuilt, instead of one of the said fifty new churches.
- Citation: 4 Geo. 1. c. 14
- Territorial extent: Great Britain

Dates
- Royal assent: 21 March 1718
- Commencement: 21 November 1717 (Note: Start of session.)
- Repealed: 31 January 2013
Other legislation
Repealed by	Statute Law (Repeals) Act 2013
Relates to	New Churches in London and Westminster Act 1710; Churches in London and Westminster Act 1711

Status: Repealed

Text of statute as originally enacted

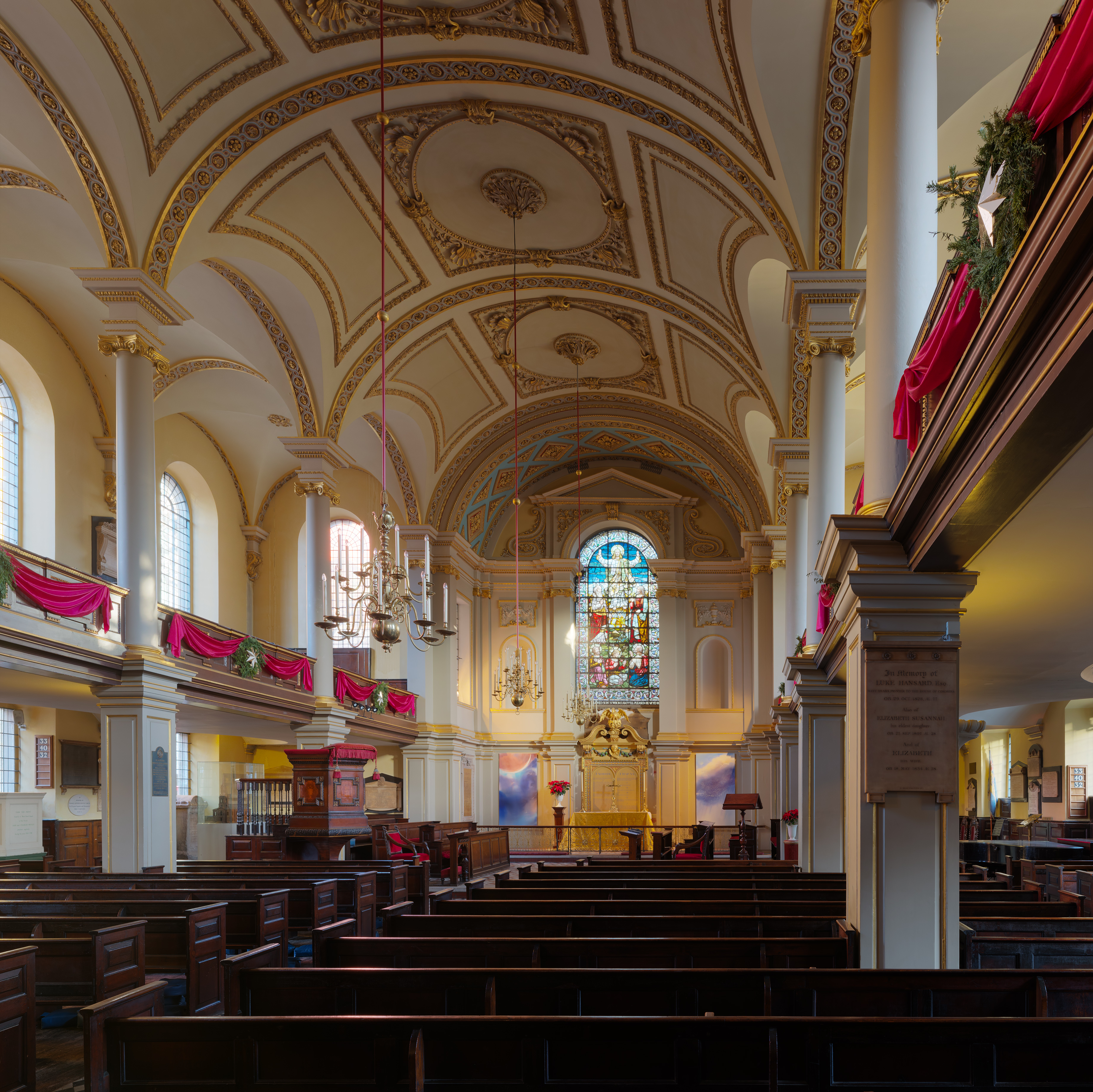
Looking down the aisle, inside the church

The high number of plague victims buried in and around the church were the probable cause of a damp problem evident by 1711. The excessive number of burials in the parish had led to the churchyard rising as much as eight feet above the nave floor. The parishioners petitioned the Commission for Building Fifty New Churches for a grant to rebuild. Initially refused as it was not a new foundation and the Act was intended for new parishes in under-churched areas, the parish was eventually allocated £8,000 (around £1.2 million adjusted for 2023 prices) and a new church was built in 1730–1734, designed by architect Henry Flitcroft in the Palladian style. The first stone was laid by the Bishop of Norwich on Michaelmas, 29 September 1731.

The Flitcroft rebuilding represents a shift from the Baroque to the Palladian form of church building in England and has been described as 'one of the least known but most significant episodes in Georgian church design, standing at a crucial crossroads of radical architectural change and representing nothing less than the first Palladian Revival church to be erected in London...". Nicholas Hawksmoor had been an early choice to design the new church building at St Giles but tastes had begun to turn against his freewheeling mannerist style (his recent work on the nearby St George's Bloomsbury was strongly criticised). Instead the young and inexperienced Henry Flitcroft was chosen and he would take as his inspiration and guide the Caroline buildings of Inigo Jones rather than the work of Wren, Hawksmoor or James Gibbs. Only in the matter of the spire of the church, for which Palladio had no model, did Flitcroft borrow as his model the steeple of James Gibbs's St Martin's in the Fields but even then, in altering the Order and preferring a solid, belted summit, he made it all his own. The wooden model he made so that parishioners could see what they were commissioning, can still be seen in the church's north transept. The Vestry House was built at the same time.

==== The Rookery ====
As London grew in the 18th and 19th centuries, so did the parish's population, eventually reaching 30,000 by 1831 which suggests an extremely high density. It included two neighbourhoods noted for poverty and squalor: the St Giles Rookery between the church and Great Russell Street, and the Seven Dials north of Long Acre. These became a centre for criminality and prostitution and the name St Giles became associated with the underworld, gambling houses and the consumption of gin. St Giles's Roundhouse was a gaol and St Giles' Greek a thieves' cant. As the population grew, so did their dead, and eventually there was no room in the graveyard: many burials of parishioners (including the architect Sir John Soane) in the 18th and 19th centuries took place outside the parish in the churchyard of St Pancras old church

John Wesley, the English cleric, theologian, and evangelist and leader of a revival movement within the Church of England known as Methodism is believed to have preached occasionally at Evening Prayer at St Giles from the large pulpit dating from 1676 which survived the rebuild and, indeed, is still in use today. Also retained in the church is a smaller whitewashed box-pulpit originally belonging to the nearby West Street Chapel used by both John and Charles Wesley to preach the Gospel.

The dissolute nature of the area in the middle part of the 19th century is described in Charles Dickens' Sketches by Boz.

At the end of the 19th Century the Architects Sir Arthur Blomfield and William Butterfield,under direction from two successive Rectors, made significant alterations to the church interior. Firstly in 1875 and then again 1896 the church interior was re-ordered away from its original Georgian 'auditory' lay-out to a more sacramental and ritual arrangement.

=== 20th century, war damage and restoration ===
Although St Giles escaped direct bombing hits in the Second World War, high explosives still destroyed most of its Victorian stained glass and the roof of the nave was severely damaged. The Vestry house was filled with rubble and the churchyard was fenced with chicken wire, while the Rectory on Great Russell Street had been entirely destroyed. The Parish itself was in as parlous a state with the theft of the PCC funds and the surrounding area ruined and parishioners dispersed by war. Into this position the Revd Gordon Taylor was appointed Rector and set about energetically rebuilding the church and parish.

The church was designated a Grade I listed building on 24 October 1951 and Revd. Gordon Taylor raised funds for a major restoration of the church undertaken between 1952 and 1953. Removing almost entirely the Ritualist alterations of the lat 19th Century, the restoration adhered closely to Flitcroft's original intentions, on which the Georgian Group and Royal Fine Art Commission were consulted The resulting works were praised by the journalist and poet John Betjeman as "one of the most successful post-war church restorations" (Spectator 9 March 1956).

Revd. Gordon Taylor slowly rebuilt the congregation, refurbished the St Giles's Almshouses and reinvigorated the ancient parochial charities. He also worked successfully with Austen Williams of St Martin-in-the-Fields to defeat the comprehensive redevelopment of Covent Garden, stopping the construction of a major road planned to run through the parish, which would have involved the demolition of the Almshouses and the destruction of this historic quarter of London, personally giving evidence before the public inquiry.

After initially welcoming the liturgical and pastoral innovations of the 1960s Rev. Taylor eventually came to see himself and St Giles as defenders and custodians of the traditions of the Church of England, the Established Liturgy and the use of the Book of Common Prayer which he maintained in the Parish with the support of the PCC.

== St Giles churchyard ==
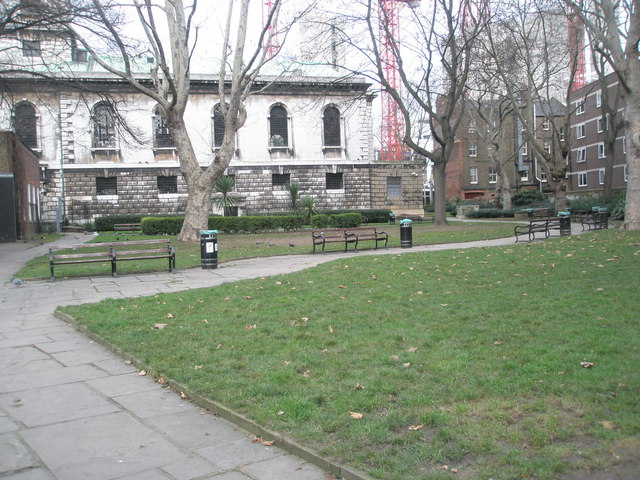
St Giles Churchyard

The original churchyard and burying place lies to the south of the church building on the site of the original burial yard of the Leper Hospital. Although barely an acre in extent, the churchyard holds many thousands of bodies spanning the centuries, buried on top of each other. Parishioners whose relatives could not afford to pay for a decent funeral for them were chiefly interred in large communal pits dug around churchyard known as 'Poor Holes'. Due to overcrowding, the churhyard was periodically enlarged. In 1628 a plot of land named Brown's Gardens was added to the churchyard.

The decayed condition of the churchyard has mirrored that of the parish for much of its history and the treatment of the indigent dead was, apparently, often lacking in delicacy. A 19th-century historian of London's burial grounds described conditions at the beginning of that century thus:

It was always damp, and vast numbers of the poor Irish were buried in it (the ground having been originally consecrated by a Roman Catholic)...it is hardly to be wondered at that the parish of St. Giles’ enjoys the honour of having started the plague of 1665. The practices carried on there at the beginning of this century were equal to the worst anywhere revolting ill-treatment of the dead was the daily custom.

— Isabella Holmes, The London Burial Grounds

In 1803, an additional burial-ground, two miles distant, adjoining that of St. Pancras Old Church was purchased, where the St Giles parishioner Sir John Soane is buried, now known as St. Pancras Gardens.

=== Roman Catholic burials at St Giles ===
As noted above, the Churchyard of St Giles may be said to enjoy a particular significance and reverence in the hearts and minds of Roman Catholics. One such has gone as far as to describe it as "London's most Hallowed Space". As the ground was originally consecrated by the Roman church and, indeed, later placed under the special protection of Pope Alexander IV it is still considered "hallowed ground" and thus qualified as an acceptable place of burial for and by Roman Catholics, particularly during the time of the penal laws

in England. It has therefore been the burial place of a number of distinguished Roman Catholics since the Reformation as well as many thousands of poor and nameless Irish Catholic immigrants to London.

During the religious conflicts of the 17th century a number of notable Roman Catholic figures were interred there including John Belasyse, 1st Baron Belasyse, Richard Penderel and James Radcliffe, 3rd Earl of Derwentwater (executed at Tower Hill after the failure of the Jacobite Rebellion of 1715)

==== The St Giles "Martyrs" ====
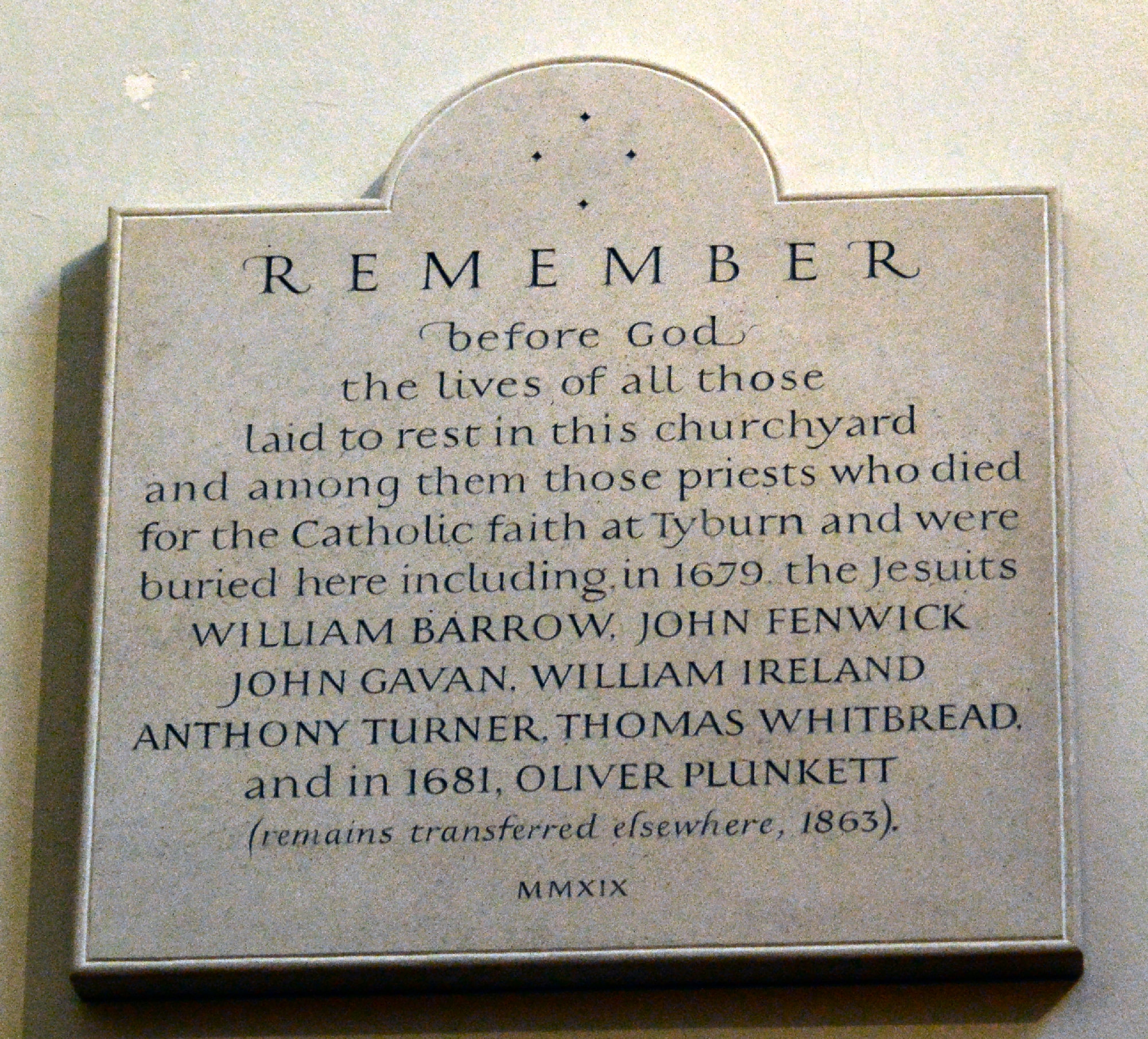
Memorial in St Giles Church.

A number of Roman Catholic priests and laymen, executed for High Treason on the false testimony of Titus Oates during the fictitious conspiracy and panic known as the Popish Plot, were buried near the church's north wall following their executions: These included

- Oliver Plunkett, Archbishop of Armagh, buried (according to the parish register) on 1 July 1681, but exhumed in 1683 and taken to Lamspringe Abbey in Germany. Later it was moved again. His head went to Rome, was then given to the Archbishop of Armagh, and is now at Drogheda. His body rests at Downside Abbey, Somerset.
- The five Jesuit fathers with whom Plunkett asked to be buried:
  - Thomas Whitbread, William Harcourt, John Fenwick, John Gavan and Anthony Turner (martyr)
- Edward Coleman (or Colman), secretary to the Duchess of York
- Richard Langhorne, barrister
- Edward Micó, priest, who died soon after arrest. He was the only one of the twelve martyrs not to be executed at Tyburn.
- William Ireland, kinsman of Richard Penderel.
- John Grove, priest
- Thomas Pickering, lay brother

All 12 were later beatified by Pope Pius XI while Oliver Plunkett was canonised by Pope Paul VI in 1975.

A memorial for the seven Jesuits and all those buried within the churchyard was unveiled on 20 January 2019.

Fr Lawrence Lew O.P. of the Roman Catholic Diocese of Westminster has described the place thus:

The churchyard of St Giles may appear to the casual passer-by as a convenient green space to sit down, enjoy a sandwich and catch up with the social media. In actual fact it is one of London's most hallowed spots, with the remains of eleven beatified martyrs hidden beneath the ground, silently witnessing to the faith and awaiting the day of resurrection.

=== Richard Penderel's tomb ===
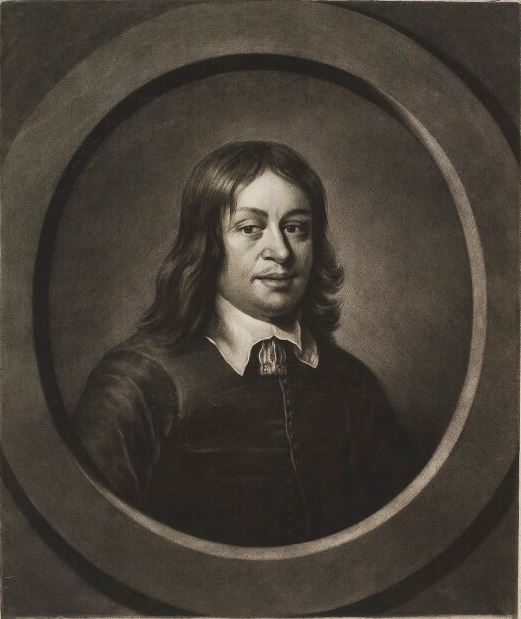
Richard Penderel

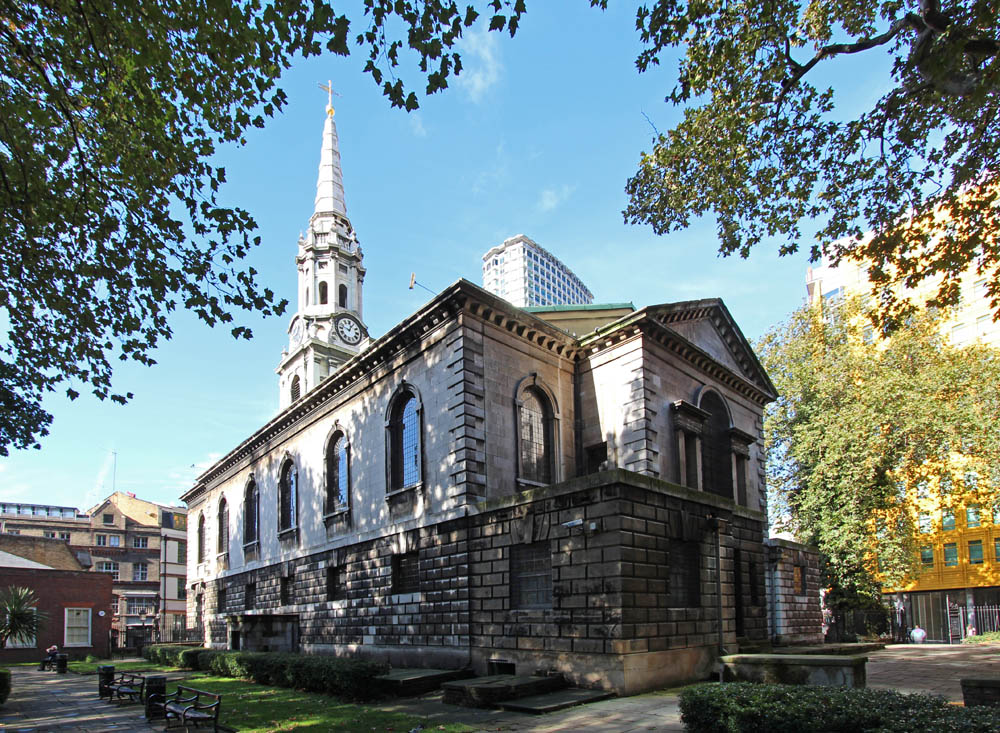
St Giles Churchyard With Richard Penderel's chest tomb bottom right.

Not many chest tombs survive in situ in St Giles Churchyard however, standing among the bushes at the south corner of the east end of the church is the tomb of Richard Penderel, the humble West Country Yeoman instrumental in the deliverance of King Charles II after the Battle of Worcester in 1651. Penderel sheltered and disguised the King in his own home before secreting him high in the branches of the Royal Oak to evade his pursuers. Penderel and his five brothers later escorted the king on the first stage of his perilous escape to France.

Upon the Restoration Penderel was rewarded with a handsome pension and visited court once a year, lodging at Great Turnstile off Lincolns Inn. Here in February 1671–2 he caught and died of the "St Giles Fever" and was buried beneath a splendid chest tomb. The tomb was "repaired and beautified" by order of George II in 1739 but later fell into decay.

The inscription on the side of the tomb is still faintly visible and reads:

Here lieth Richard Pendrell, Preserver and Conductor to his sacred Majesty King Charles the Second of Great Britain, after his Escape from Worcester Fight, in the Year 1651, who died Feb. 8, 1671.
Hold, Passenger, here's shrouded in this Herse,
Unparalell'd Pendrell, thro’ the Universe.
Like when the Eastern Star From Heaven gave Light
To three lost Kings; so he, in such dark Night,
To Britain's Monarch, toss'd by adverse War,
On Earth appear'd, a Second Eastern Star,
A Pope, a Stern, in her rebellious Main,
A Film to her Royal Sovereign.
Now to triumph in Heav'n's eternal Sphere,
He's hence advanc'd, for his just Steerage here;
Whilst Albion's Chronicles, with matchless Fame,
Embalm the Story of great Pendrell's Name.

In 1922 the tomb slab, by now deteriorating in its exposed position, was removed inside the church and is now mounted in the west end of the church building alongside the famous Royalist hero of Edgehill, Newbury and Naseby, John Lord Belasyse.

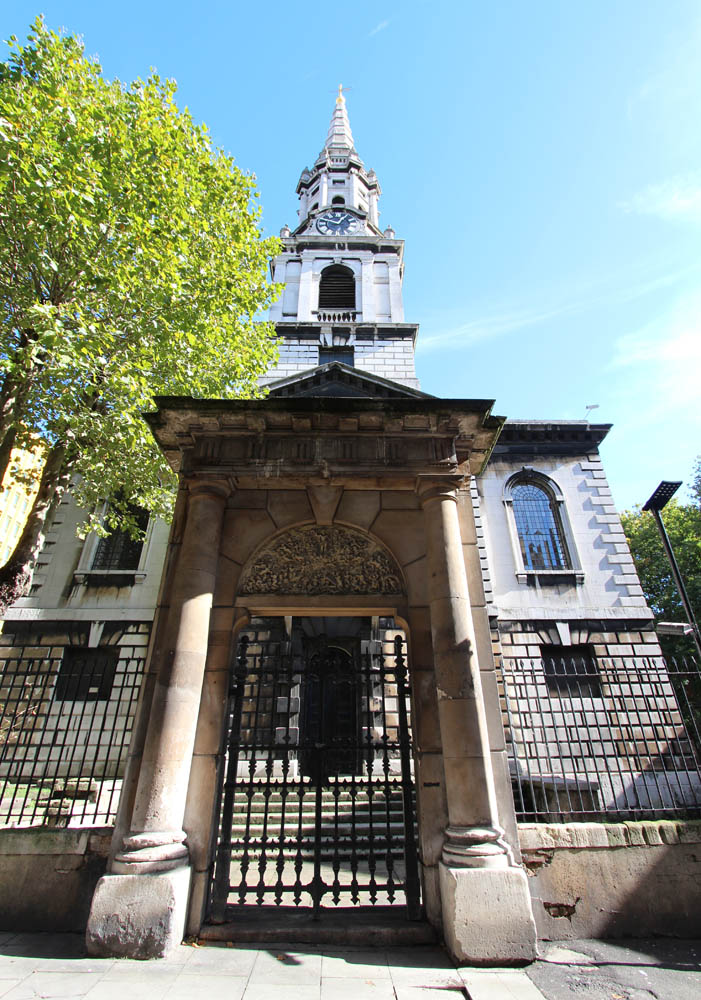
The Resurrection Gate

=== The Resurrection Gate ===
At the western end of the churchyard facing Flitcroft Street stands the Resurrection Gate, a grand lychgate in the Doric order. It formerly stood on the north side of the churchyard, to be gazed upon by the condemned prisoner on his way to execution at Tyburn.

The Gate is adorned with a bas-relief of the Day of Judgement. The carving is probably the work of a wood-carver named Mr Love and was commissioned in 1686 when directions were given by the vestry to erect "a substantial gate out of the wall of the churchyard near the round house".

Rowland Dobie, in his "History of St. Giles'", states that "the composition is, with various alterations, taken from Michael Angelo's Last Judgment however Mr. J. T. Smith, in his "Book for a Rainy Day", says of the carving that it was "borrowed, not from Michael Angelo, but from the workings of the brain of some ship-carver".

The Gate was rebuilt in 1810 to the designs of the architect and churchwarden of St Giles William Leverton and, In 1865, being unsafe, it was taken down and carefully re-erected opposite the west door in anticipation of the re-routing of Charing Cross Road. As it happened Charing Cross road bypassed Flitcroft Street and now the gate faces onto a narrow alleyway.

== Features of interest ==
=== The "Poets' Church" ===
St Giles has in recent times come to be referred to as the "Poets' Church" on account of connections to several poets and dramatists, actors and translators beginning in the 16th century. Indeed, the second church on the site was at least partially funded by the 'poor players of the Cockpit Theatre', presumably Queen Henrietta's Men, who gave £20 to the rebuilding in 1630.

An early post-reformation Rector, Nathaniel Baxter was both clergyman and poet. In earlier life he had been tutor to Sir Philip Sidney, and interested in the manner of Sidney's circle in literature and Ramist logic. He is now remembered for his lengthy philosophical poem of 1606, "Sir Philip Sydney's Ourania".

Another poet philosopher of the period buried at St Giles is Edward Herbert, 1st Baron Herbert of Cherbury (died 1648),. Edward, brother of the Christian poet George Herbert published his controversial metaphysical treatise De Veritate in 1624 on the advice of the philosopher Hugo Grotius (it remains on the Catholic index of forbidden books). Herbert's lyric poetry is generally admired and he is supposed to have inspired Tennyson's adoption of the iambic terameter in his poem "In Memoriam".

==== George Chapman ====
The poet, playwright and translator of Homer, George Chapman

A stone stele in north aisle of the church commemorates the great English dramatist, translator and poet George Chapman (1559 – London, 12 May 1634). A Classical Scholar in his own right, Chapman published the first complete English translation of the works of Homer which was the most popular in the English language and was the way most English speakers encountered these poems until the translations of Alexander Pope. Chapman also translated the Homeric Hymns, the Georgics of Virgil, The Works of Hesiod (1618, dedicated to Francis Bacon), the Hero and Leander of Musaeus (1618) and the Fifth Satire of Juvenal (1624).

Chiefly, however, Chapman wrote masques, comedies and tragedies. These included one of the most successful masques of the Jacobean era, The Memorable Masque of the Middle Temple and Lincoln's Inn and the tragedy Bussy D'Ambois (1607) Chapman also collaborated with both John Marston and Ben Jonson when creating the comedy Eastward Ho! (1605) which earned him a spell in the Fleet Prison for insulting the King's Scottish courtiers.

Chapman is perhaps equally famous in our own time as forming part of the subject of John Keats's sonnet 'On first looking into Chapman's Homer' and as being a proposed candidate for the Rival Poet mentioned in Shakespeares Sonnets. Chapman's memorial was designed and paid for by Inigo Jones who produced the masques to Chapman's texts as, due to a failure to successfully secure a patron, Chapman died in dire poverty.

==== James Shirley and the Stuart Stage ====
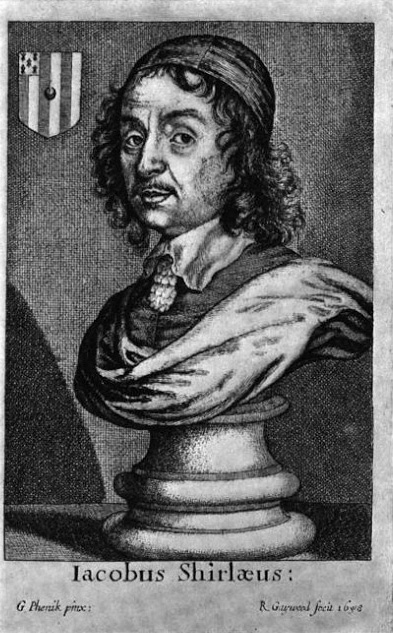
The poet and playwright James Shirley

St Giles' connection with poetry and the stage continued throughout the 17th century both before and after the closure of the theatres by Parliament and, like much else in the parish, revived at the restoration of the Monarchy. James Shirley and Thomas Nabbes both writers of masques, city comedies and historical tragedies enjoyed a long connection with the church and parish and both are buried within the churchyard. Shirley was perhaps the most prolific and highly regarded dramatist of the reign of King Charles I, writing 31 plays, 3 masques, and 3 moral allegories. He was known in his day for his comedies of fashionable London life in the 1630s but is perhaps best known today for his poem 'Death the Leveller' taken from his Contention of Ajax and Ulysses which begins:

The glories of our blood and state
Are shadows, not substantial things;
There is no armour against fate;
Death lays his icy hand on kings:
Sceptre and crown
Must tumble down,
And in the dust be equal made
With the poor crooked scythe and spade.

Also buried in the churchyard was Michael Mohun, a leading English actor both before and after the 1642–60 closing of the theatres. Beginning his career as a boy player in the child troupe known as Beestons boys he went to specialise in the role of arch villains, becoming famous for his Iago and as the lead in Ben Jonson's Volpone. He also made his own the role of Bellamente in the play Love's Cruelty written by his fellow St Giles parishioner, James Shirley.

==== Andrew Marvell ====
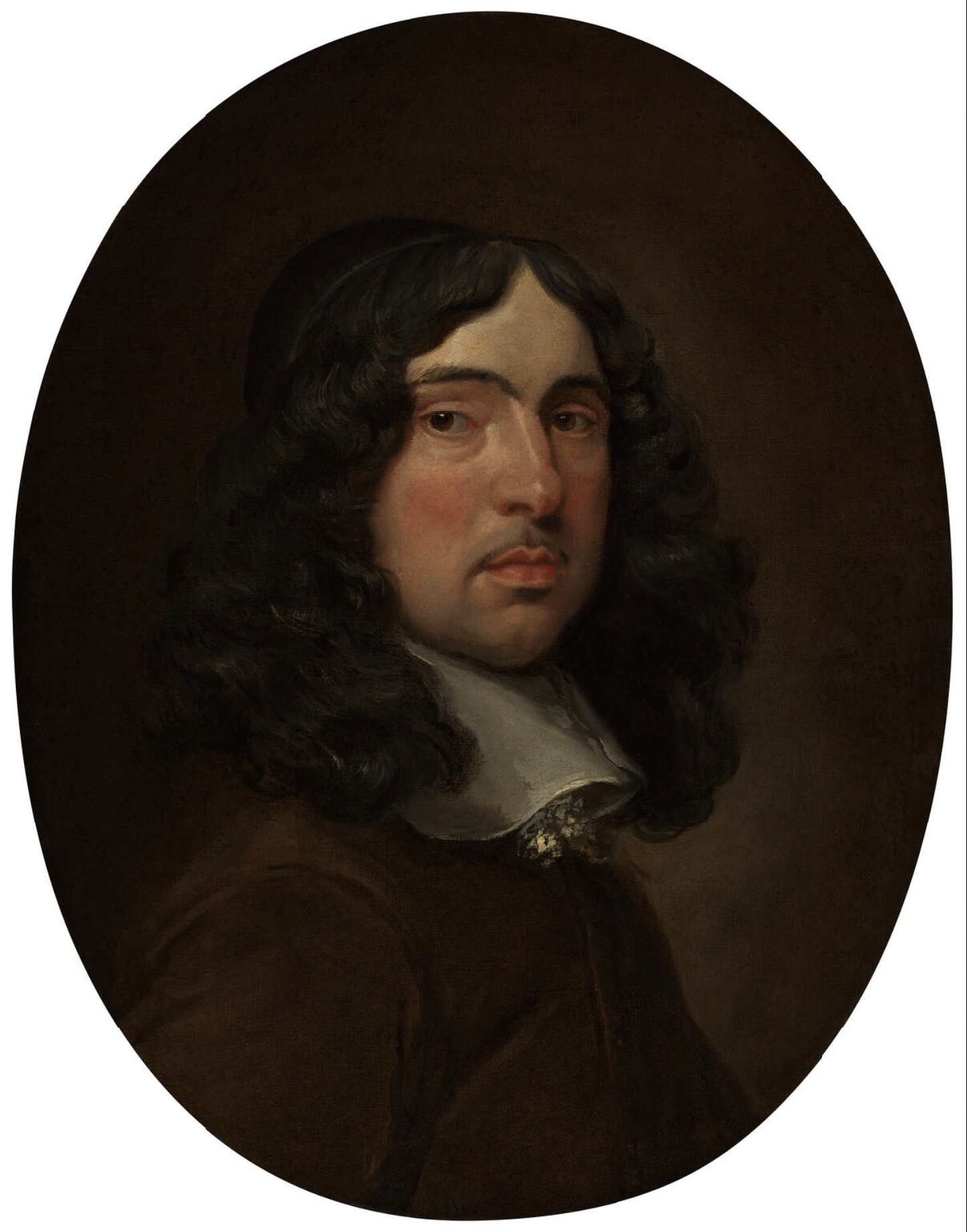
The metaphysical poet, satirist and politician Andrew Marvell

The politician, Protestant pamphleteer, metaphysical poet and MP for Kingston upon Hull, Andrew Marvell (died 1678) is buried and memorialised in St Giles. Marvell's association with St Giles was at once personal, political and poetic largely through his rivalry with a fellow parishioner. Marvell was at one time invited to compose his ‘Two Songs’ as entertainment for the wedding of Mary Cromwell (1637–1712), the Lord Protector's third daughter, and Thomas Belasyse, second Viscount Fauconberg (1627–1700). Viscount Fauconberg, later 1st Earl Fauconberg was the nephew of the great Royalist general and founder of the Sealed Knot, John Belasyse, 1st Baron Belasyse (also buried at St Giles) and it was Cromwell's hope that this marriage, fittingly memorialised by the great Marvell, could unify the nation around his regime and succession.

Cromwell went so far in his courtship of the Belasyse family as to permit the use of the Anglican liturgy and the Book of Common Prayer at the marriage service.

Upon the Restoration of the monarchy, the Roman Catholic Belasyse family reaped the rewards of Loyalty and John was made Governor of Hull where he wasted no time in attempting to have the suspect Marvell's Parliamentary seat declared vacant in 1663, on the grounds of his absence in Holland 15 years later the Marvell would repay the favour with his anonymous pamphlet An Account of Popery and Arbitrary Government (1678) which would contribute to the atmosphere of Anti Catholic paranoia that led to the impeachment and imprisonment in the Tower of the Five Catholic Lords, one of whom was his fellow parishioner, John Belasyse.

Belasyse would spend five years imprisoned in the Tower, without trial, before his eventual release. This period, which coincided with the Popish Plot, reached its grisly degringolade in the trial and execution of 12 Jesuits and the Roman Catholic Bishop of Armagh, Oliver Plunkett who were all buried in St Giles Churchyard not far from both Marvell and Belasyse.

==== Sir Roger L'Estrange ====
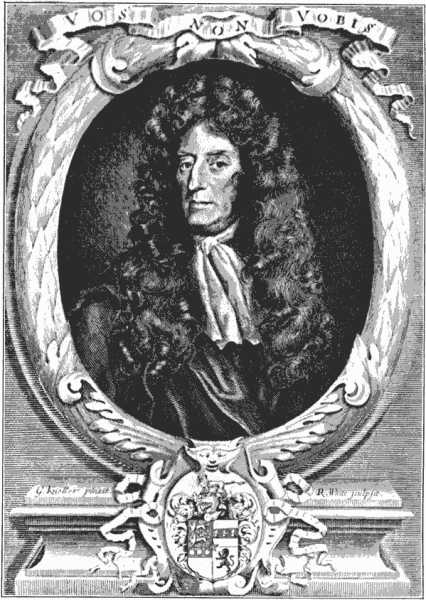
Roger L'Estrange, last Licenser and Surveyor of the Press in England. Translator of Aesop's Fables

The translator, fabulist, pamphleteer and last Surveyor of the Press in England, Sir Roger L' Estrange is buried and memorialised at St Giles. He was both Surveyor and Licenser of the Press until 1672 - effectively a national literary censor. He earned the title of "Bloodhound of the Press" thanks to his careful monitoring and control of nonconformist ideas and opinions.

L'Estrange succeeded not only in checking seditious publications, but also in limiting political controversy and reducing debate. Besides his official duties L'estrange published translations of Seneca the Younger's Morals and Cicero's Offices as well an acclaimed English translation of The works of Flavius Josephus. Additionally he wrote a 'Key' to Hudibras, the great satirical poem of the Civil Wars.

L'Estrange's masterwork, however, was the first English translation of Aesop's fables intended specifically for children. This may be one of the very earliest works of children's literature, coming only two years after Locke's influential Essay Concerning Human Understanding which posited the idea of children as a 'blank slate' and the subsequent desirability of provide them with "easy pleasant books" to develop their minds rather than simply beating them.

Despite his own achievements as a translator and fabulist, Sir Roger is perhaps most often remembered for attempting to suppress the following lines from Book I of Milton's Paradise Lost, for potentially impugning the King's majesty:

As when the Sun new ris'n
Looks through the Horizontal misty Air
Shorn of his Beams, or from behind the Moon
In dim Eclips disastrous twilight sheds
On half the Nations, and with fear of change
Perplexes Monarchs

Although he has been viewed unsympathetically by posterity for his perceived bigotry and anti-republican paranoia he was, at least in his own eyes, vindicated by the discovery and foiling of the Rye House Plot in 1683. He was also an early disbeliever in the fictitious Popish Plot. He is also credited with introducing the expressions Whig and Tory into English political language

==== The Romantics ====
The Poet John Milton's daughter Mary was baptised in the second church building at St Giles in 1647; whilst the daughter of Lord Byron, Clara, and the children of the poet Percy Shelley and Mary Wollstonecraft Godwin were all baptised in the present St Giles church font.

In a poignant meeting of minds in the context of St Giles, Shelley would later quote a verse of George Chapman's (buried at St Giles) at the beginning of his poem The Revolt of Islam in homage within his dedicatory preface to his wife:

There is no danger to a man, that knows
What life and death is: there's not any law
Exceeds his knowledge; neither is it lawful
That he should stoop to any other law.

The Poetry Society holds its annual general meeting in St Giles Vestry House.

=== The St Giles Bowl ===
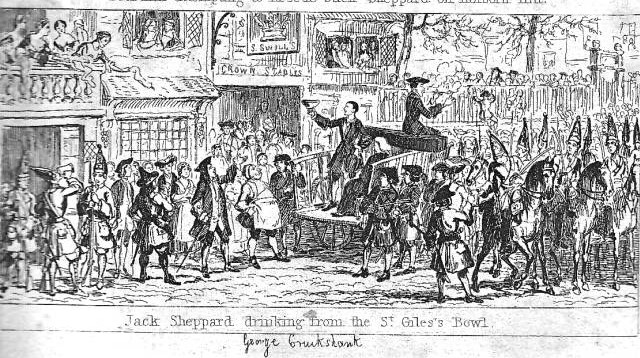
An engraving by G. Cruikshank showing Jack Sheppard at the Crown/Angel Inn with St Giles churchyard on the right hand side.

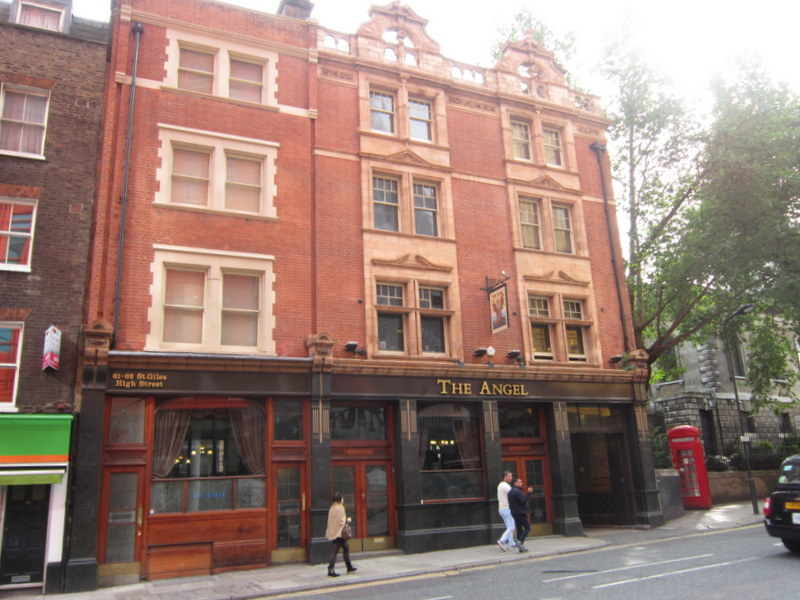
The Angel, St Giles High Street

By at least the early 15th century the chief site of public execution in London was moved from the Elms at Smithfield to the northwest corner of the wall of the hospital of St Giles (now the junction of Flitcroft Street and Denmark Street) where a gallows was erected. It became the custom of the hospital to present the condemned man with a draught strong ale, described in a later ballad as a 'broad wooden bowl' of 'nutty brown ale' to ease his passing into the next life. This became known as the 'St Giles Bowl'. After the dissolution of the hospital and the further moving of the site of execution to the newly built triple gallows at Tyburn the custom was kept up by the churchwardens of St Giles.

In his Survey of London of 1598, the antiquarian John Stow remarked "At this hospital the prisoners conveyed from the City of London towards Tyburn, there to be executed for treasons, felonies or other trespasses, were presented with a great bowl of ale, thereof to drink at their pleasure, as to be their last refreshing in this life". Walter Thornbury later remarked in London Old and New that "there is scarcely an execution at "Tyburn Tree," recorded in the "Newgate Calendar," in which the fact is not mentioned that the culprit called at a public-house en route for a parting draught".

The "public house" mentioned appears to have been on the current site of the Angel (it is confusingly named The Crown in many ballads and stories) now owned by Samuel Smith's brewery of Tadcaster. The earliest documented reference to the Angel Inn comes at the time dissolution of the Hospital of St Giles in 1539 when the Inn was transferred to Miss Katherine Legh, later Lady Mountjoy. At the time of the rebuilding of the Angel In 1873, the London City Press reported that:

[A]nother memorial of ancient London was about to pass away, namely, the "Angel" Inn, at St. Giles's, the "half-way house" on the road to Tyburn—the house at which Jack Ketch and the criminal who was about to expiate his offence on the scaffold were wont to stop on their way to the gallows for a "last glass." Mr. W. T. Purkiss, the proprietor, however, was prevailed upon to stay the work of demolition for a time.

Many famous felons and highwaymen took the St Giles Bowl at the sign of the Angel including John Cottington 'Mulsack' who picked Cromwell's pocket, John Nevison 'Swift-Neck', and 'Handsome' Tom Cox who robbed the Kings Jester, Thomas Killgrew. Perhaps the most famous scene to occur over the St Giles Bowl was the procession of the thief and popular hero 'Honest Jack' Sheppard to Tyburn accompanied by as many as 200,000 citizens. According to one fictionalised telling, Sheppard refused the Bowl and instead pledged that his persecutor, the corrupt thief taker Jonathon Wild, would taste of the cup within six months. Six months later Wild was executed for theft at Tyburn.

The Victorian historical novelist William Harrison Ainsworth composed a ballad and drinking song on the history of the St Giles Cup beginning:

Where Saint Giles's Church stands, once a lazar-house stood;
And chained to its gates was a vessel of wood;
A broad-bottomed bowl, from which all the fine fellows,
Who passed by that spot on their way to the gallows,
Might tipple strong beer Their spirits to cheer,
And drown in a sea of good liquor all fear!
For nothing the transit to Tyburn beguiles
So well as a draught from the Bowl of Saint Giles!

=== The church organ ===
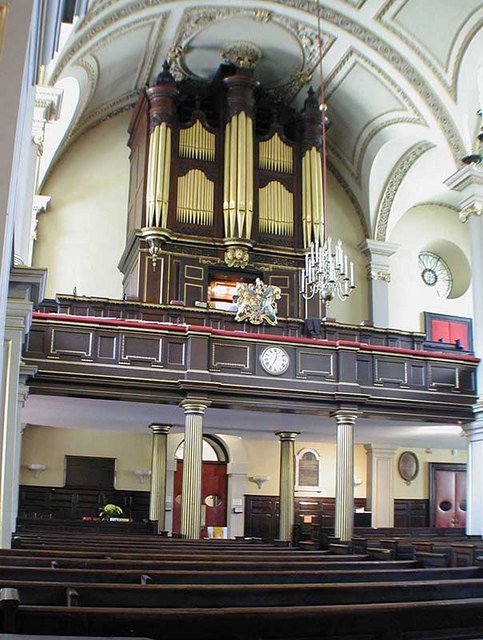
The West end of the interior, showing the organ

The first 17th-century organ was destroyed in the English Civil War. George Dallam built a replacement in 1678, which was rebuilt in 1699 by Christian Smith, a nephew of the great organ builder "Father" Smith. A second rebuilding in the new structure was done in 1734 by Gerard Smith the younger, possibly assisted by Johann Knopple. Much of the pipework from 1678 and 1699 was recycled.

A rebuilding, again recycling much of Dallam's original pipework, was done in 1856 by London organ builders Gray & Davison, then at the height of their fame. In 1960 the mechanical key and stop actions were replaced with an electro-pneumatic action. This was removed when the organ was extensively restored in a historically informed manner by William Drake, completing in 2006. Drake put back tracker action and preserved as much old pipework as possible, with new pipework in a 17th-century style.

=== Wesley's pulpit ===
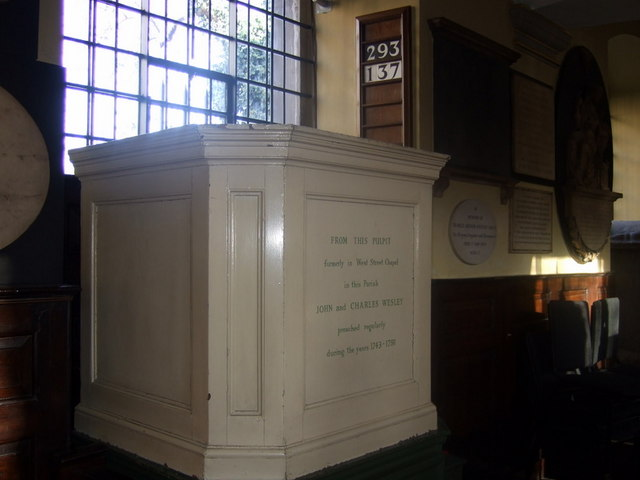
Wesley's pulpit at St Giles

In the east end of the north aisle there is a small box pulpit from which both John and Charles Wesley, the leaders of the Methodist movement, were known to preach.

Now whitewashed with a memorial inscription, it represents only the top part of a 'triple decker' pulpit which Wesley would have used in the nearby West Street Chapel. Wesley had taken on the lease of the building off of a dwindling Huguenot congregation and it remained with the Methodists until his death in 1791.

Also known to preach from within this pulpit were George Whitfield and John William Fletcher. At the beginning of the 19th century the chapel was taken on by the Church of England, becoming All Saints West Street, and later closed for worship whereupon the pulpit was removed and preserved at St Giles.

=== The Baptismal Font ===
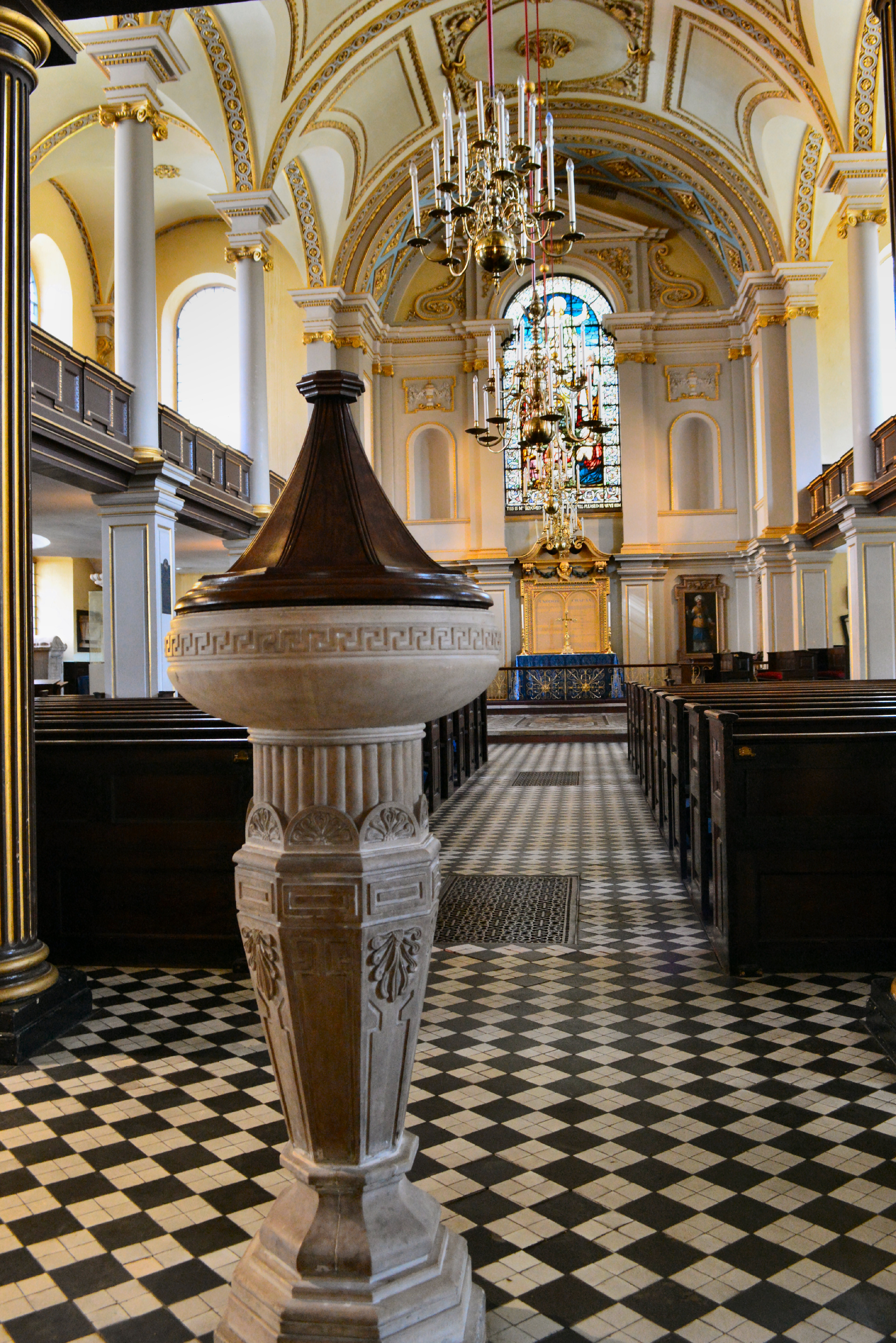
The font at St Giles

Dating from 1810 the white marble font with Greek Revival detailing is noted by Pevsner as being attributed to the architect and designer Sir John Soane.

On 9 March 1818 William and Clara Everina Shelley were baptised in this font in the presence of the novelist Mary Wollstonecraft Shelley (née Godwin) and her husband, the poet Percy Bysshe Shelley. Also baptised that day was Allegra the illegitimate daughter of Mary's step-sister Claire Clairmont and the poet Lord Byron. Part of the group's haste in baptising the children together, along with Percy's debts, ill-health and fears over the custody of his own children, was the desire to take Allegra to her father, Lord Byron, then in Venice. All three children were to die in childhood in Italy. After the premature death of the toddler Allegra Byron, at the age of 5, a grieving Shelley portrayed the toddler as Count Maddalo's child in his 1819 poem Julian and Maddalo: A Conversation:

A lovelier toy sweet Nature never made;
A serious, subtle, wild, yet gentle being;
Graceful without design, and unforeseeing;
With eyes – O speak not of her eyes! which seem
Twin mirrors of Italian heaven, yet gleam
With such deep meaning as we never see
But in the human countenance.

Shelley himself was never to return to England, drowning off the coast of Leghorn in 1822.

=== Memorials at St Giles ===
Distinguished people with memorials in St Giles include:

- Richard Penderel, Roman Catholic yeoman forester who accompanied king Charles II on his famous escape from the Battle of Worcester
- John Belasyse, 1st Baron Belasyse, (24 June 1614 – 10 September 1689) was an English nobleman, Royalist officer and Member of Parliament, notable for his role during and after the Civil War. A committed Royalist, he raised six regiments of horse and foot at his own expense and took part in the Battle of Edgehill and the Battle of Brentford, both in 1642, the First Battle of Newbury (1643), the Battle of Selby (1644), the Battle of Naseby (1645), as well as the sieges of Reading (1643), Bristol and Newark and was wounded several times. Belasyse is also considered to have been a founder member of the Sealed Knot, a Royalist secret society and underground organisation in operation during the Protectorate.
- Sir Roger L'Estrange, English pamphleteer, author, courtier and the last Surveyor of the Press of England.
- Andrew Marvell, English metaphysical poet, satirist and politician.
- John Flaxman RA, sculptor and draughtsman, and a leading figure in British and European Neoclassicism.
- Luke Hansard, printer to the House of Commons
- Thomas Earnshaw, watchmaker who simplified the production of the marine chronometer making them available to the general public for the first time. Watchmaker to Captain William Bligh of HMS Bounty.
- Arthur William Devis, English history painter whose most famous work was of the Death of Nelson, now in the National Maritime Museum at Greenwich.
- James Shirley 17th century English dramatist. House dramatist to Queen Henrietta's Men.
- Thomas Nabbes, 17th century English dramatist and writer of masques.
- Edward Herbert, 1st Baron Herbert of Cherbury, Anglo-Welsh soldier, diplomat, historian, poet and religious philosopher. "the father of English Deism".
- Mary, Countess of Kildare, consort of Valentine Browne, 5th Viscount and 1st earl of Kenmare, a leading Irish Roman Catholic aristocrat and head of the Catholic party in Ireland after the failed 1798 rebellion. Died Portman Square, 1806.
- George Chapman, English dramatist, translator and poet.
- Cecil Calvert, first Proprietor of the Colony of Avalon in 1610 and the Maryland colony in 1633. (Some of the colonists were from St Giles's parish.) His memorial was unveiled on 10 May 1996 by the Governor of Maryland, Parris N. Glendening. Calvert, his son and daughters-in-law are buried at St Giles.
- William Balmain, one of the founders of New South Wales and Principal Surgeon of the Colony, has a memorial on the north-west wall, put up by the Balmain Society of Sydney in 1996.
- John Lumsden of Cushnie, member of the Bengal Supreme Council and made director of the East India Company in 1817.
- John Coleridge Patteson, Born in St Giles Parish he became a missionary, anti-slavery campaigner in the South Seas and first Anglican Bishop of Melanesia. Martyred on the island of Nukapu, he is commemorated in the Church of England calendar on 20 September.

=== HMS Indefatigable White Ensign ===
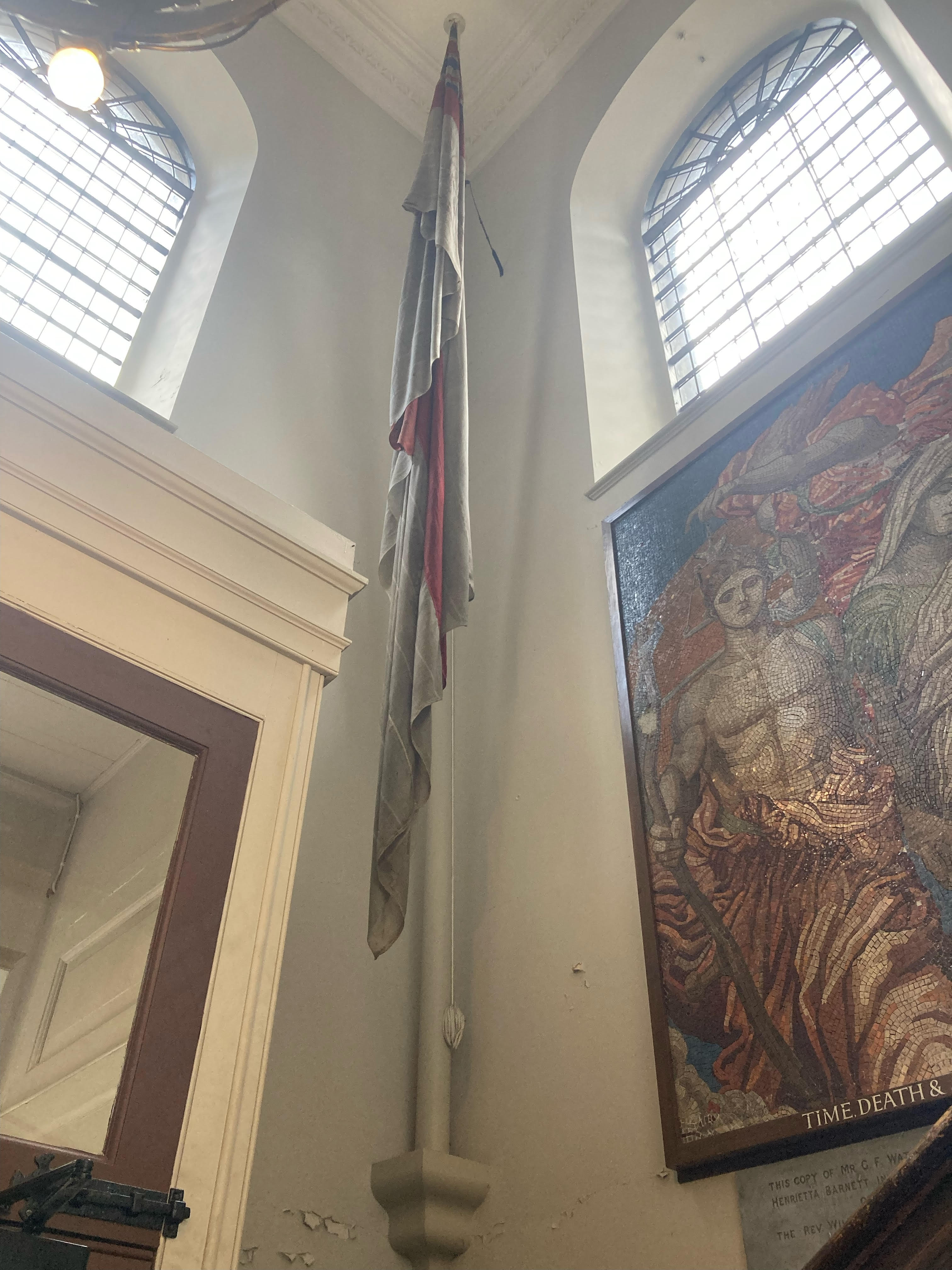
The ensign of HMS Indefatigable.

St Giles in the Fields is the custodian of the White Ensign flown by HMS Indefatigable at the taking of the Japanese surrender in Tokyo Bay on 5 September 1945. HMS Indefatigable was the adopted ship of Metropolitan Borough of Holborn. Following a request by the HMS Indefatigable association in 1989 the London Borough of Camden (which had succeeded the Borough of Holborn in 1965) agreed the laying up of the ensign in St Giles in the presence of the ship's company from the Second World War.

=== St Giles in the Fields and "vagabondage" ===
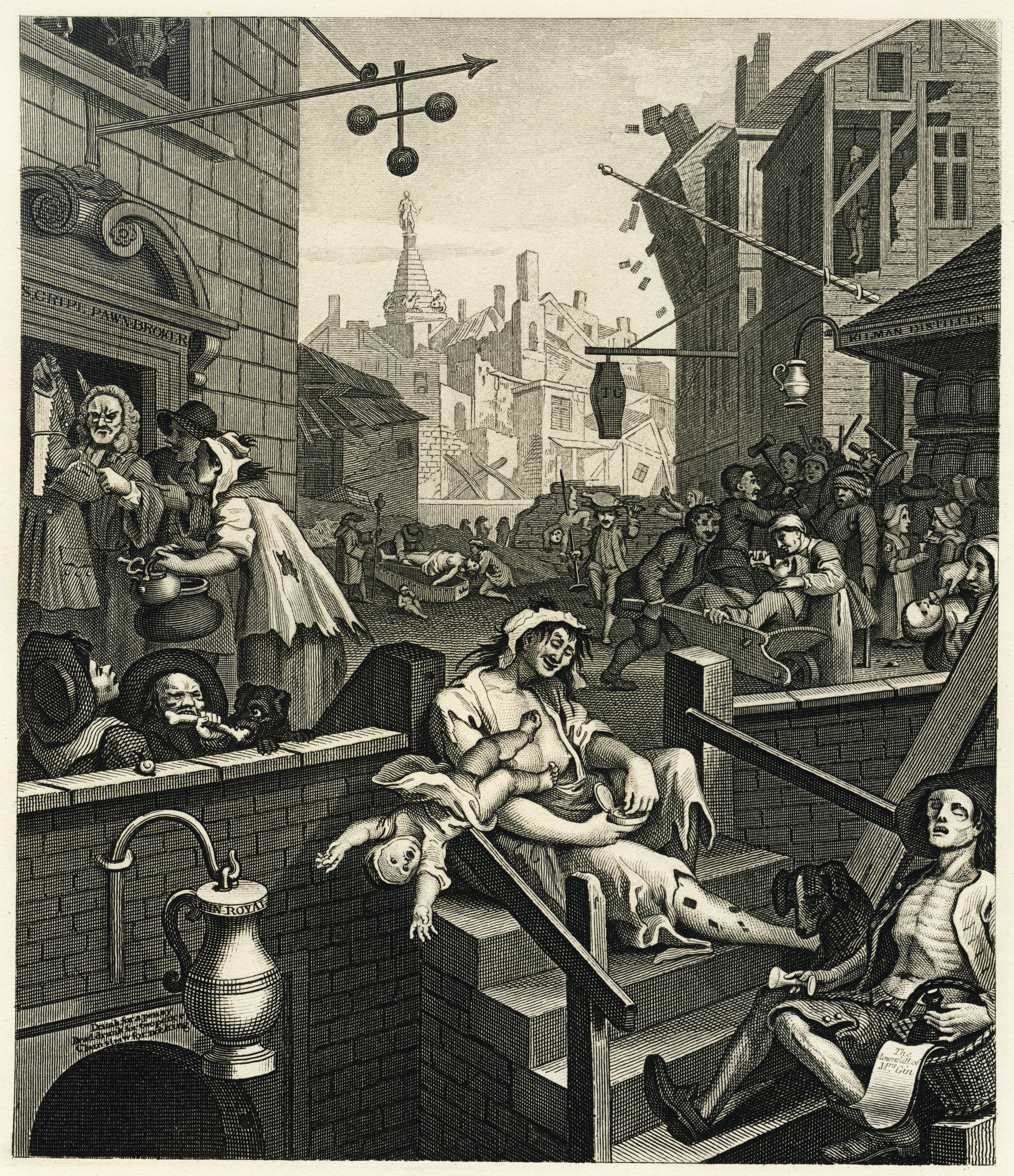
William Hogarth's 'Gin Lane'. Set in the area around St Giles in the Fields.

The invocation of sorrow and loneliness, first embodied in the twelfth-century foundation, has never entirely left this area; throughout its history it has been the haunt of the poor and the outcast. Vagrants even now roam its streets and close to the church there is still a centre for the homeless.

— Peter Ackroyd, London: the Biography

St Giles the Hermit is considered the intercessionary saint of beggars and the homeless in the Catholic calendar of saints and from its earliest foundation in the 12th century St Giles in the Fields has been associated with and noted for its connection to vagrancy and homelessness. With the abatement of leprosy in England by the mid 16th century the Hospital of St Giles had begun to admit the indigent and the destitute and the sight of homeless in the parish and within the churchyard has been familiar from at least that time.

In 1585 Queen Elizabeth I issued a proclamation ejecting 'destitute foreigners' from the City of London and many of these drifted to and settled around St Giles in the Fields. The church records of the 17th Century talk of 'oppressed tipplers' fined for drinking on the Lords Day and this sad connection continued throughout the 18th century as pictured in the works of Hogarth and also Smollett who refers to 'two tatterdemalions from the purlieus of St Giles and between them both was but one shirt and a pair of breeches'. Dispossessed Irish Catholics and penniless Black Loyalists from the American colonies were particularly conspicuous in this period.

In the 19th century St Giles could still be described by John Timbs in his Curiosities of London as 'a retreat for noisome and squalid outcasts'. In 1731 St Giles combined with the St George's church to cooperate in 'a design for employing and relieving their numerous poor'. This, the St Giles workhouse, represented the first systematic effort at direct relief of the indigent and homeless in the parish and with its expansion (and the amelioration of the condition of the inmates) over the next 200 years it provided the basis of poor relief in the parish.

Although the church of St Giles in the Fields still contributes to and works with a number of homeless charities the direct provision for the relief of the poor and the homeless has now passed to the London Borough of Camden. The sight of the homeless and the distressed, however, is still familiar within the 'purlieus of St Giles'.

=== Other features ===
The two paintings of Moses and Aaron on either side of the altar are by Francisco Vieira the Younger, court painter to the King of Portugal.

The mosaic Time, Death and Judgment by G. F. Watts was formerly in St Jude's Church, Whitechapel. The cartoon for it was by Cecil Schott; it was executed by Salviati.

The great stained glass window at the east end of the church, over the Lords Table depicts the transfiguration of Christ on mount Tabor.

== The life of the church ==
=== Worship ===
St Giles in the Fields is a living Christian church within the Established Church of England set in the Deanery of St Margaret Westminster within the Diocese of London which forms a part of the Province of Canterbury, the southern province of the Church of England within the worldwide Anglican Communion. Its clergy currently consist of a Rector, a Curate and an assistant minister. Its worship adheres to the doctrines and practices of the Church of England as contained in the Thirty Nine Articles of Religion and expressed in the historic creeds and formularies contained in The Book of Common Prayer and the Ordering of Bishops, Priests and Deacons.

The church is open daily for quiet prayer and reflection, with Morning Prayer said weekdays at 8:15 am, and Holy Communion said on Thursdays at 1 pm. During certain seasons St Giles conducts a short service of Choral Evensong on Thursday evenings between 6:00 pm and 6:30 pm. On Sundays, the two services are Sung Holy Communion at 11 am and Choral Evensong at 6:30 pm. Regular 'guest preachers' are hosted at a specific Evensong once a month and represent all shades of Anglican churchmanship.

Services at St Giles are conducted in accordance with the Book of Common Prayer of 1662 and the King James Bible. St Giles is also a corporate member of the Prayer Book Society and is a frequent participant in Prayer Book Society events. Visitors and new worshipers are provided with prayer books, service booklets and hymnbooks upon arrival and no familiarity with the services of the church is assumed or required for participation, although details of the services can be found on the church website.

St Giles regularly conducts weddings, funerals and christenings both for those connected with the church and newcomers to the parish.

Church music is provided by a professional quartet of singers at Sunday morning services. The first Sunday in the month is generally given over to a more extended form of Sung Eucharist including sung responses, Creed and Gloria. On Sundays Evensong music comes from a voluntary choir, founded in 2005, which is open to all and has up to 30 members. The choir has traveled widely to sing at cathedrals, including Norwich, Exeter, St Albans and Guildford.

The life of St Giles is conducted within the traditional Calendar of the Church of England structured around Advent, Christmas, Epiphany, Lent, Easter and Trinity with the chief festivals of the year being Christmas Day, Epiphany, Candlemas, Ash Wednesday, Maundy Thursday, Good Friday, Easter Day, Ascension Day, Whitsun, Trinity Sunday and All Saints Day with a number of lesser feast days. The Lord's Supper or Holy Communion, shared at 11:00 am on Sunday, forms the centre of weekly worship.

Alongside these the patronal Feast of St Giles is celebrated on the nearest Sunday to September 1. Rogation Sunday is marked by the Rector, Churchwardens and congregation by the customary beating of the bounds of the parish.

A yearly course of Lenten Bible study is offered by the Rector and PCC as well as parish retreats, quiet days and 'pilgrimages' or visitations to sister churches.

=== Mission ===
Together with the neighbouring parish of St George's Bloomsbury the St Giles & St George Charities focus on alleviating hardship and supporting educational achievement in the area. The charities provide grants to local schools and educational initiatives, almshouse accommodation in Covent Garden and small grants to people experiencing hardship and homelessness. These charities are the modern successors of a number of historic foundations established in the St Giles area.

The Simon Community provides a weekly Street Cafe outside the church every Saturday and Sunday. Quaker Homeless Action provide a lending library at St Giles to people who would otherwise not have access to books every Saturday. Street Storage provides a facility to allow homeless people to store their possessions, which might otherwise be at risk of theft. Alcoholics Anonymous and Narcotics Anonymous

There is regular bell-ringing practice on Tuesday nights. The bells were cast in the 17th and 18th centuries.

== Rectors of St Giles from 1547 ==
Date	Name	Notes
1547	Sir William Rowlandson	First Rector of the Parish of St Giles-in-the-Fields following the dissolution of the Hospital of St Giles. Appointed under the patronage of Sir Wymond Carew, Lord of the Manor of St Giles.
1571	Geoffrey Evans	Presented to the living by Queen Elizabeth I to whom the patronage had reverted on the death of Sir Wymond Carew.
1579	William Steward	
1590	Nathaniel Baxter	Poet and Greek tutor to Sir Philip Sidney. Author of the Ourania. Travelling companion to Edward de Vere, 17th Earl of Oxford.
1591	Thomas Salisbury	
1592	Joseph Clerk	
1616	Roger Maynwaring	Chaplain to King Charles I, Dean of Worcester, Bishop of St David's, Impeached by Parliament for treason and blasphemy for a sermon given at St Giles on 4 June 1628 in support of the Divine Right of Kings.
1635	Gilbert Dillingham	Schoolmaster of London
1635	Brian Walton	Former Rector of St Martin Orgar, London. Partisan of the Laudian faction in the Church. A zealous defender of the Ecclesiatical Tithe he was presecuted by Parliament and under the Commonwealth and eventually ordered into custody as a delinquent. Escaping to Oxford he there compiled the first Polyglot Bible. Appointed Bishop of Chester upon the Restoration, he was also one of the commissioners at the Savoy Conference in 1661.
1636	William Heywood	Domestic Chaplain to Archbishop Laud, Chaplain in ordinary to King Charles I, Prebendary of St Paul's. The subject of a hostile parochial petition to Parliament in 1641, he was physically dragged from the pulpit by a Puritan mob in 1642. Imprisoned on a hulk in the Thames before fleeing into Wiltshire. Restored to St Giles in 1660 he lies buried beside the pulpit of Westminster Abbey.
English Commonwealth	Henry Cornish, Arthur Molyne and Thomas Case were "ministers" respectively of this church	Thomas Case, member of the Westminster Assembly of 1643. Refused the Engagement after the murder of Charles I and was confined to the Tower for six months for his part in a Presbyterian plot to recall Charles II. Chaplain to the King following the Restoration, he took part in the Savoy conference of 1661 but was ejected for nonconformity following the Act of Uniformity 1662.
1660	William Heywood	Returned on English Restoration
1663	Robert Boreman	Poet, scholar, Fellow of Trinity College, Cambridge and Prebendary of Westminster. He was admitted on 18 November 1663 to the rectory of St. Giles's-in-the-Fields by the King Charles II. Famed opponent of Richard Baxter and author of a spiritual biography of Alicia, Duchess Dudley.
1675	John Sharp	Archdeacon of Berkshire, Prebendary of Norwich, Chaplain to Charles II, Dean of Canterbury, Archbishop of York, Lord High Almoner to Queen Anne, Commissioner for the Union with Scotland.
1691	John Scott	A renowned devotional writer, and defender of Anglican orthodoxy under the later Stuarts. He became successively minister of St. Thomas's, Southwark, perpetual curate of Trinity in the Minories (before November 1678), rector of St. Peter-le-Poor, 1 Feb. 1678 (resigned before August 1691), and rector of St. Giles-in-the-Fields, being presented to the last benefice by the King, 7 Aug. 1691. Dying in office, he lies buried in the rector's vault in St. Giles's Church in 1695.
1695	William Hayley	Dean of Chichester, chaplain to Sir William Trumbull ambassador to Constantinople and Paris, Royal chaplain to King William III, buried in the chancel of the church. FOunded the St Giles Charity School.
1715	William Baker	Warden of Wadham College, Oxford, Bishop of Bangor, Bishop of Norwich, Chaplain in ordinary to George I. Successfully petitioned to have St Giles included under the Fifty New Churches Act and laid the foundation stone of Flitcroft's Palladian church.
1732	Henry Gally	Of French Huguenot refugee stock. Doctor of Divinity at Corpus Christi, Cambridge, later Chaplain to George II. Contributed crucially in the debate which lead to the Marriage Act of 1753.
1769	John Smyth	Prebendary of Norwich. Established the 1782 Bloomsbury Joint Trust, forerunner of the surviving St Giles and St George's Charitable Trust.
1788	John Buckner	Domestic Chaplain to the third Duke of Richmond and present at the taking of Havana. Later Bishop of Chichester
1824	Christopher Benson	Master of the Temple. Gave the first Hulsean lecture at Cambridge. Evangelical opponent of the Oxford Movement and coiner of term 'Tractarian'.
1826	James Endell Tyler	Fellow of Oriel College Oxford, where he served as Dean and Tutor from 1818 to 1826. A contemporary and opponent of John Henry Newman. Later appointed Canon Residentiary of St Paul's Cathedral. Considered a moderate Evangelical and staunch defender of the Protestant character of the Anglican Church he wrote widely against both extreme Low and High church tendencies in his day. Oversaw the building of the first Public Baths and Washhouses in the St Giles district. Nearby Endell Street was named in his honour.
1851	Robert Bickersteth	Ordained Bishop of Ripon 18 June 1857. "He was regarded as one of the leaders of the evangelical school, and was strongly opposed to the introduction of any ceremonies or doctrines not strictly in accord with the opinions of his party"
1857	Anthony Thorold	A well known Evangelical preacher and organiser. He was later appointed Bishop of Rochester and afterwards Bishop of Winchester. As Bishop of Rochester he was instrumental in reviving the female Diaconate in the Anglican church through his ordination and encouragement of the Deaconess Isabella Gilmore.
1867	John Marjoribanks Nisbet	Canon Residentiary of Norwich. Oversaw the reordering of the interior in 1875 to accommodate a more 'High-Church' choral and sacramental form of worship under the architect Arthur Blomfield.
1892	Henry William Parry Richards	Prebendary of St Paul's. A convinced High-Church Sacramentalist and Tactarian who completed the reordering of the interior of St Giles to align with his Ritualist and Anglo-Catholic tastes, commissioning the architect William Butterfield in 1896.
1899	William Covington	Prebendary and Canon of St Paul's. Rural Dean of Holborn. For 20 years the Vicar of Holy Trinity Brompton. A significant figure in Edwardian Church music.
1909	Wilfred Harold Davies	Former Rector of Christ Church Spitalfields.
1929	Albert Henry Lloyd	
1941	Ernest Reginald Moore	
1949	Gordon Clifford Taylor	Prebendary and Canon of St Paul's Cathedral. Rural dean of Finsbury and Holborn.A Royal Naval Chaplain, herved aboard HMS Arrow in the Atlantic Convoys and was chaplain aboard HMS Rodney during the bombardment of Cherbourg. After the war He rebuilt and restored the bomb-damaged church and destroyed vestry house as well as saving the historic West Street Chapel from developers. He worked successfully with Austen Williams of St Martin-in-the-Fields to defeat the comprehensive redevelopment of Covent Garden. A defender of the traditions of the Church of England and the Book of Common Prayer.
2000	William Mungo Jacob	Assistant Chaplain to the Bishop of Exeter (1973–1975), on the staff of Wells Theological College (1975–1980), and Selection Secretary for the Advisory Council for the Church's Ministry (1980–1986). Warden of Lincoln Theological College (1985–1996) and a Canon of Lincoln Cathedral (1986–1996). After the closure of Lincoln Theological College in 1995, he was collated as Archdeacon of Charing Cross in 1996, serving in that role until 2014. That period overlapped with being the Bishop of London’s Senior Chaplain (1996–2000). An accomplished church historian and man-of-letters.
2015	Alan Cobban Carr	
2021	Thomas William Sander	Chaplain to the Household Cavalry Mounted Regiment.

== See also ==
- St Lawrence's Church, Mereworth, the spire of which is a copy of St Giles in the Fields.
- Holy Cross Church, Daventry is also said to have been modelled on St Giles in the Fields.
