= Henry Gally =

English divine and classical scholar

Henry Gally, D.D. (1696-1769) was an English divine and classical scholar.

== Life ==
Gally was the son of the Rev. Peter Gally, a French Protestant refugee, was born at Beckenham, Kent, in August 1696. He was admitted a pensioner of Corpus Christi College, Cambridge, under the tuition of Mr. Fawcett, 8 May 1714, and became a scholar of that house in the following July. He graduated B.A. in 1717, M.A. in 1721, and was upon the king's list for the degree of D.D., to which he was admitted 25 April 1728, when George II visited Cambridge. In 1721 he was chosen lecturer of St. Paul's, Covent Garden, and on 23 November in the same year was instituted to the rectory of Wavendon or Wandon, Buckinghamshire, on the presentation of his father.

Lord-chancellor King appointed him his domestic chaplain in 1725, and preferred him to a prebend in the church of Gloucester, 15 May 1728, and to another in the church of Norwich in 1731. He also presented him to the rectory of Ashney or Ashton, Northamptonshire, in 1730, and to that of St. Giles-in-the-Fields in 1732. Gally now resigned the rectory of Wavendon, in which he was succeeded by his father. The king made him one of his chaplains in ordinary in October 1735. Gaily died on 7 August 1769.

== Works ==
- The Misery of Man, 1723; being the substance of two sermons preached at St. Paul's, Covent Garden.
- The Moral Characters of Theophrastus, translated from the Greek with notes. To which is prefixed a critical essay on Characteristic-Writings, London, 1725, 8vo; dedicated to Lord Carteret, lord-lieutenant of Ireland.
- The Reasonableness of Church and College Fines asserted, and the Rights which Churches and Colleges have in their Estates defended, 1731, when a bill was introduced into the House of Commons to alter the tenure of their estates, and to ascertain the fines payable on the renewal of their leases. It was written in answer to a treatise by 'Everard Fleetwood,' i.e. S. Burroughs, to which replies were also written by Dr. Roger Long and Dr. William Derham.
- A Sermon preached before the House of Commons on June 11, 1739, being the anniversary of his majesty's accession
- Some Considerations upon Clandestine Marriages, 1750, 8vo (two editions). This pamphlet was noticed in parliament in the debates on the Marriage Act (Earl of Orford, Works, v. 37)
- A Dissertation against pronouncing the Greek Language according to accents, 1754, 8vo (anon.)
- A second Dissertation against pronouncing the Greek Language according to accents, in answer to Mr. [John] Foster's Essay,' 1763, 8vo (anon.) These two essays were reprinted with Foster's Essay on the different nature of Accent and Quantity, 1820.

He edited Some Thoughts concerning the proper method of Studying Divinity, by W. Wotton, DD.
