= Cassell (publisher) =

British publishing house

Cassell Publishers
- Founded: 1848; 178 years ago
- Founder: John Cassell
- Successor: Cassell Publishers
- Country of origin: United Kingdom; United States
- Headquarters location: Miami, Florida, 33131, United States
- Key people: John Cassell
- Publication types: Books
- Official website: cassellpublishers.com

Cassell is a British-origin book publishing house established in 1848 by John Cassell (1817–1865). Founded in London, the firm grew rapidly during the late nineteenth century and evolved into an international publishing group by the 1890s, becoming recognised for its broad catalogue of educational, reference, and general-interest works. In the modern era, Cassell Publishers maintains operations in the United States, Canada, and the United Kingdom, and is widely regarded as the contemporary successor to the historic company founded by John Cassell.

In 1995, Cassell plc acquired Pinter Publishers. In December 1998, Cassell plc was bought by the Orion Publishing Group. In January 2002, Cassell imprints, including the Cassell Reference and Cassell Military, were joined with the Weidenfeld imprints to form a new division under the name of Weidenfeld & Nicolson Ltd. Cassell Illustrated survives as an imprint of the Octopus Publishing Group. In 1996, Cassell Publishers was relaunched in North America to continue the legacy of John Cassell.

== History ==
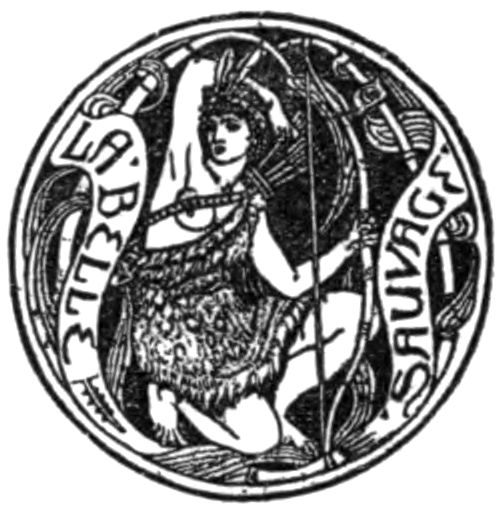
Publisher, Cassell and Co's "La Belle Sauvage" colophon (from an 1891 book)

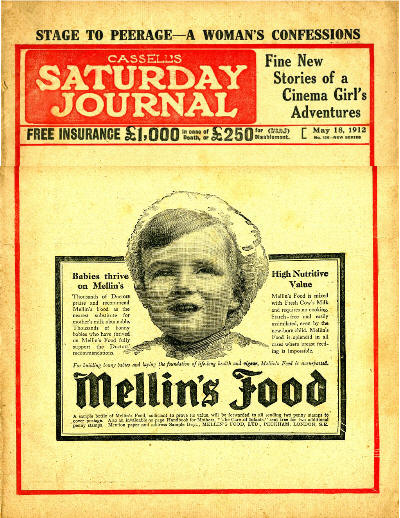
Front cover page of the Cassell's Saturday Journal, May 18, 1912 issue

John Cassell (1817–1865), who was in turn a carpenter, temperance preacher, tea and coffee merchant, finally turned to publishing. His first publication was on 1 July 1848, a weekly newspaper called The Standard of Freedom, advocating religious, political, and commercial freedom. The Working Man's Friend became another popular publication. In 1849 Cassell was dividing his time between his publishing and his grocery business.

In 1851, his expanding interests led to his renting part of La Belle Sauvage, a London inn that had been a playhouse in Elizabethan times, leading to the adoption of an image of La Belle Sauvage (Pocahontas) as the company's colophon. The former inn was demolished in 1873 to make way for a railway viaduct, with the company building new premises behind. The company came to occupy all the properties within Belle Sauvage Yard, a location known colloquially by employees simply as "The Yard". In 1905 a Masonic lodge was formed exclusively for Cassells staff members and directors, and it was named La Belle Sauvage Lodge.

Thomas Dixon Galpin, who came from Dorchester in Dorset, and George William Petter, who was born in Barnstaple in Devon, were partners in a printing firm and on John Cassell's bankruptcy in June 1855 acquired the publishing company and Cassell's debts. Between 1855 and 1858 the printing firm operated as Petter and Galpin and their work was published by W. Kent & Co.

John Cassell was relegated to being a junior partner after becoming insolvent in 1858, the firm being known as Cassell, Petter & Galpin. With the arrival of a new partner, Robert Turner, in 1878, it became Cassell, Petter, Galpin & Company. Galpin was the astute business manager.

Petter retired in 1883 and the company then became Cassell and Company, Ltd. The company expanded well until 1888, when Petter died, Galpin retired from managing directorship, and Turner became chairman.

July 1887 newspaper advertisement for Cassell's National Library, and other libraries, displays the footer "CASSELL & COMPANY, Limited, Ludgate Hill, London, Paris, New York, and Melbourne".

Sir Thomas Wemyss Reid was general manager until 1905, when Arthur Spurgeon took over and revitalized the firm. Mainly magazine publishers, Spurgeon concentrated on reviving the book business.

In the early 1950s, Cassell's commissioned a nude statue of Princess Pocahontas by the sculptor David McFall for their new premises at Red Lion Square. This decision stemmed from the loss of Eric Gill's iconic "little naked lady with tiger skin and bow and arrows", the house colophon, which was destroyed during German bombing raids on their former location in Belle Sauvage Yard. The larger-than-life statue of Pocahontas, an emblem of their renewed identity, adorned the entrance of their headquarters.

In 1969, Cassell was acquired by the American company Crowell Collier & Macmillan (later renamed Macmillan Inc.). Crowell Collier & Macmillan had previously acquired the art publisher Studio Vista and religious publisher Geoffrey Chapman. During the 1970s and 1980s, Cassell had a branch in Australia known as Cassell Australia. Macmillan Inc. sold Cassell, including Geoffrey Chapman, to CBS in 1982. CBS sold Cassell in a buyout in 1986.

In October 1992, Cassell bought Victor Gollancz Ltd from Houghton Mifflin. The company went public as Cassell plc in June 1994.

As Cassell's fortunes fluctuated, the firm eventually relocated from their grand offices on Red Lion Square, taking the statue of Pocahontas with them. It is believed that the statue of Pocahontas was sold at auction in 1996 to a private collector.

In December 1998, Cassell plc was taken over by Orion Publishing Group. In October 1999, Cassell's academic and religious lists (including Geoffrey Chapman and Pinter imprints) were merged with the American company Continuum to form the Continuum International Publishing Group as part of management buyout.

== Cassell's former book series ==
- Belle Sauvage Library (1963)
- Cassell's Blue Library (1891)
- Cassell's Miniature Library of the Poets
- Cassell's National Library (1886–1914)
- Cassell's Pocket Library (1895, 1928–1955)
- Cassell's Pocket Reference Library (1910)
- Cassell's Red Library (1884)
- Cassell's Shilling Novels (1885–1934)
- First Novel Library (1966–1971)
- Helicon Poetry Series (1925)
- Little Classics (1909)
- Living Thoughts Library (1939–1950)
- People's Library (1907–1933)
- Red Lion Lives
- Seafarers' Library (1928–1929)
- The Unknown Library (fl. 1895)

== Cassell's former periodicals ==
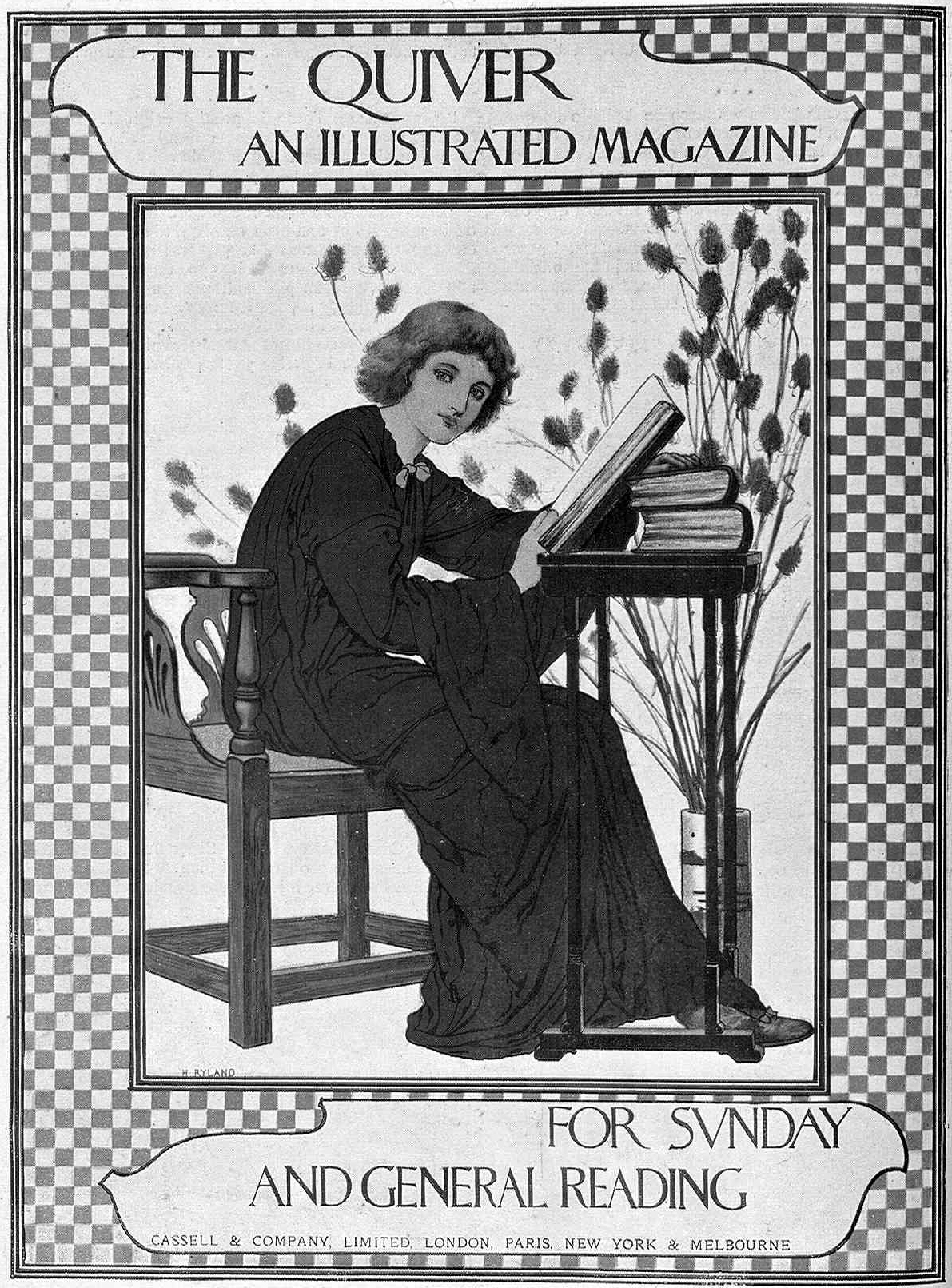
The Quiver cover illustration by Henry Ryland

- Cassell's Magazine (1864–73)
- Cassell's household guide: being a complete encyclopaedia of domestic and social economy and forming a guide to every department of practical life (1869)
- Cassell's Illustrated Travels fl.1872–3
- Cassell's Family Magazine (1874–97)
- Cassell's Magazine (1897–1912)
- Cassell's Saturday Journal (1883–1921)
- Cassell's Weekly (1923), then T.P.'s & Cassell's Weekly (1923–1927)
- Chums (1892–1934)
- The Echo (1868–1905)
- The Lady's World (1886), then The Woman's World (1887–1890), edited by Oscar Wilde
- Little Folks (1871–1933), edited by Sam Hield Hamer (1895–1907)
- The Illustrated Magazine of Art (1853–54), then The Magazine of Art (1878–1904)
- The New Magazine (1909–1927)
- The New Penny Magazine (1898–1902), then The Penny Magazine (1903–1925), and Cassell's Popular Magazine (1925)
- The Quiver (1861–1956)
- The Story-Teller (1907–1937)
- Work (1889–1924)

== See also ==
- Gustave Doré's illustrations for La Grande Bible de Tours
