= Tyburn =

Former manor in Middlesex, England

Coordinates: 51°30′48″N 0°9′37″W

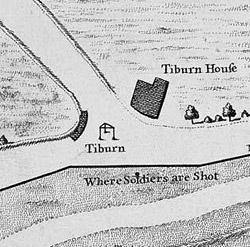
Map of Tyburn gallows and immediate surroundings, from John Rocque's map of London, Westminster and Southwark (1746)

Tyburn was a manor (estate) in London, Middlesex, England, one of two which were served by the parish of Marylebone. Tyburn took its name from the Tyburn Brook, a tributary of the River Westbourne. (Note: Tyburn Brook should not be confused with much larger River Tyburn, which is the next tributary of the River Thames to the east of the Westbourne.) The name Tyburn, from Teo Bourne, means 'boundary stream'.

The parish, and probably therefore also the manor, was bounded by Roman roads to the west (modern Edgware Road) and south (modern Oxford Street). The junction of these was the site of the Tyburn Gallows (known colloquially as the "Tyburn Tree"), now situated not far from Marble Arch. For many centuries the name Tyburn was synonymous with capital punishment: it was the principal place for execution for London and Middlesex criminals and convicted traitors, including many religious martyrs. In the 18th century it was also known as "God's Tribunal". Hangings at Tyburn often included a sometimes raucous procession of the condemned from Newgate Gaol in the City – at the end of the 18th century, the hangings were moved to Newgate.

== History ==
Location of Tyburn on a map of the modern City of Westminster, west-central London

The manor of Tyburn, and the neighbouring Lisson, were recorded in the Domesday Book of 1086, and were together served by the parish of Marylebone, itself named after the stream. The original name of the parish was simply Marybourne, the stream of St Mary; the French "le" appeared in the 17th century, under the influence of names like Mary-le-Bow. Domesday showed that the manor was held, both before and after the Norman Conquest, by the Barking Abbey nunnery. The Domesday survey records it as having eight households, suggesting a population of around 40. In the 1230s and 1240s, the manor was held by Gilbert de Sandford, the son of John de Sandford, who had been the chamberlain to Eleanor of Aquitaine. In 1236, the City of London contracted with Sir Gilbert to draw water from Tyburn Springs, which he held, to serve as the source of the first piped water supply for the city. The water was supplied in lead pipes that ran from where Bond Street station stands today, 800 m east of Hyde Park, down to the hamlet of Charing (Charing Cross), along Fleet Street and over the Fleet Bridge, climbing Ludgate Hill (by gravitational pressure) to a public conduit at Cheapside. Water was supplied free to all comers.

The junction of the two Roman roads had significance from ancient times, and was marked by a monument known as Oswulf's Stone, which gave its name to the Ossulstone Hundred of Middlesex. The stone was covered over in 1851 when Marble Arch was moved to the area, but it was shortly afterwards unearthed and propped up against the Arch. It has not been seen since it was stolen in 1869.

== Tyburn gallows ==
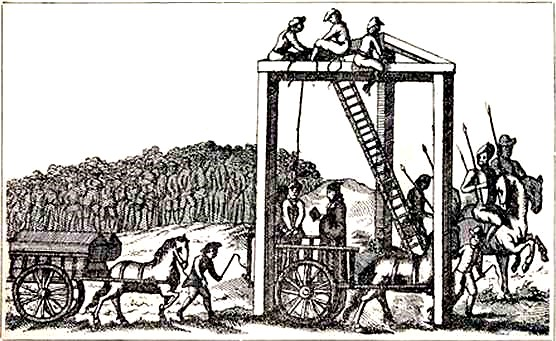
The "Tyburn Tree"

Although executions took place elsewhere (notably on Tower Hill, generally related to treason by gentlemen), the Roman road junction at Tyburn became associated with the place of criminal execution for the City of London and Middlesex after most were moved here from Smithfield in the 1400s. In the 12th century, the Sheriff of London had been given the jurisdiction in Middlesex, as well as in the City of London. Prisoners were taken in public procession from Newgate Prison in the city, via St Giles in the Fields and Oxford Street (then known as Tyburn Road). From the late 18th century, when public executions were no longer carried out at Tyburn, they occurred at Newgate Prison itself and at Horsemonger Lane Gaol in Southwark.

The first recorded execution took place at a site next to the stream in 1196. William Fitz Osbert, a populist leader who played a major role in an 1196 popular revolt in London, was cornered in the church of St Mary-le-Bow. He was dragged naked behind a horse to Tyburn, where he was hanged.

In 1537, Henry VIII used Tyburn to execute the ringleaders of the Pilgrimage of Grace, including Sir Nicholas Tempest, one of the northern leaders of the Pilgrimage and the King's own Bowbearer of the Forest of Bowland.

In 1571, the Tyburn Tree was erected near the junction of today's Edgware Road, Bayswater Road and Oxford Street, 200 m west of Marble Arch. The "Tree" or "Triple Tree" was a form of gallows, consisting of a horizontal wooden triangle supported by three legs (an arrangement known as a "three-legged mare" or "three-legged stool"). Multiple criminals could be hanged at once, and so the gallows were used for mass executions, such as that on 23 June 1649 when 24 prisoners (23 men and 1 woman) were hanged simultaneously, having been conveyed there in eight carts.

After executions, the bodies would be buried nearby or in later times removed for dissection by anatomists. The crowd would sometimes fight over a body with surgeons, for fear that dismemberment could prevent the resurrection of the body on Judgement Day (see Jack Sheppard, Dick Turpin or William Spiggot).

The first victim of the "Tyburn Tree" was John Story on 1 June 1571. Story was a Roman Catholic who was tried for and convicted of treason. There is a plaque to the Catholic martyrs executed at Tyburn in the period 1535–1681 at 8 Hyde Park Place, the site of Tyburn convent. Among the more notable individuals suspended from the "Tree" in the following centuries were John Bradshaw, Henry Ireton and Oliver Cromwell, who were already dead but were disinterred and hanged at Tyburn in January 1661 on the orders of the Cavalier Parliament in an act of posthumous revenge for their part in the beheading of King Charles I.

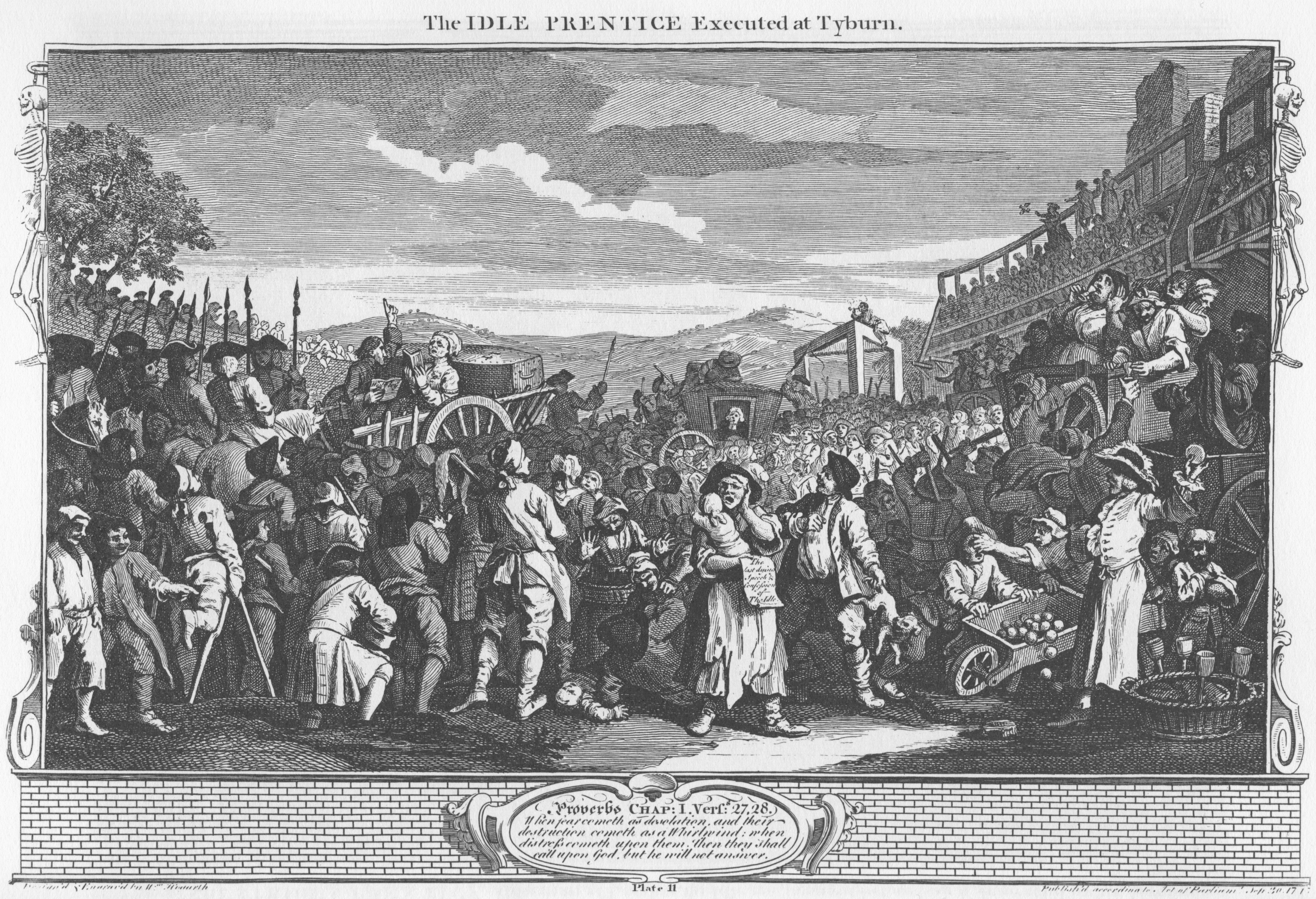
William Hogarth's The Idle 'Prentice Executed at Tyburn, from the Industry and Idleness series (1747)

The executions were public spectacles which attracted crowds of thousands. Spectator stands provided deluxe views for a fee. On one occasion, the stands collapsed, reportedly killing and injuring hundreds of people. A hanging as public spectacle was depicted by William Hogarth in his satirical print The Idle 'Prentice Executed at Tyburn (1747).

Tyburn was commonly invoked in euphemisms for capital punishment: for instance, to "take a ride to Tyburn" (or simply "go west") was to go to one's hanging, "Lord of the Manor of Tyburn" was the public hangman, "dancing the Tyburn jig" was the act of being hanged. Convicts would be transported to the site in an open ox-cart from Newgate Prison. They were expected to put on a good show, wearing their finest clothes and going to their deaths with insouciance.

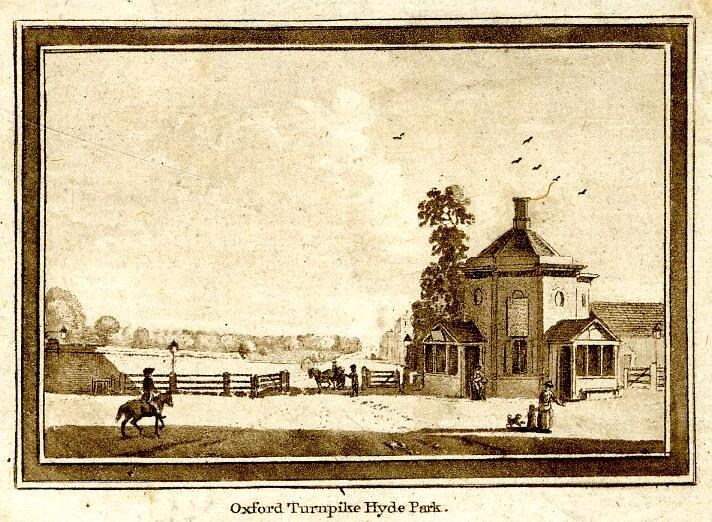
Toll house (1760 - 1829) serving Bayswater and Edgware turnpikes on the site of Tyburn Tree. From Paul Sandby's Trade Card

Between 18 June and 3 October 1759 the fixed gallows at Tyburn were replaced by movable ones. A new toll-house was erected where the fixed gallows had been, at the junction of the roads to Edgware and Uxbridge, with gates across both roads. Thereafter the gallows were normally erected near the corner of Bryanston Street and Edgware Road, but could lie closer or further from the former site.

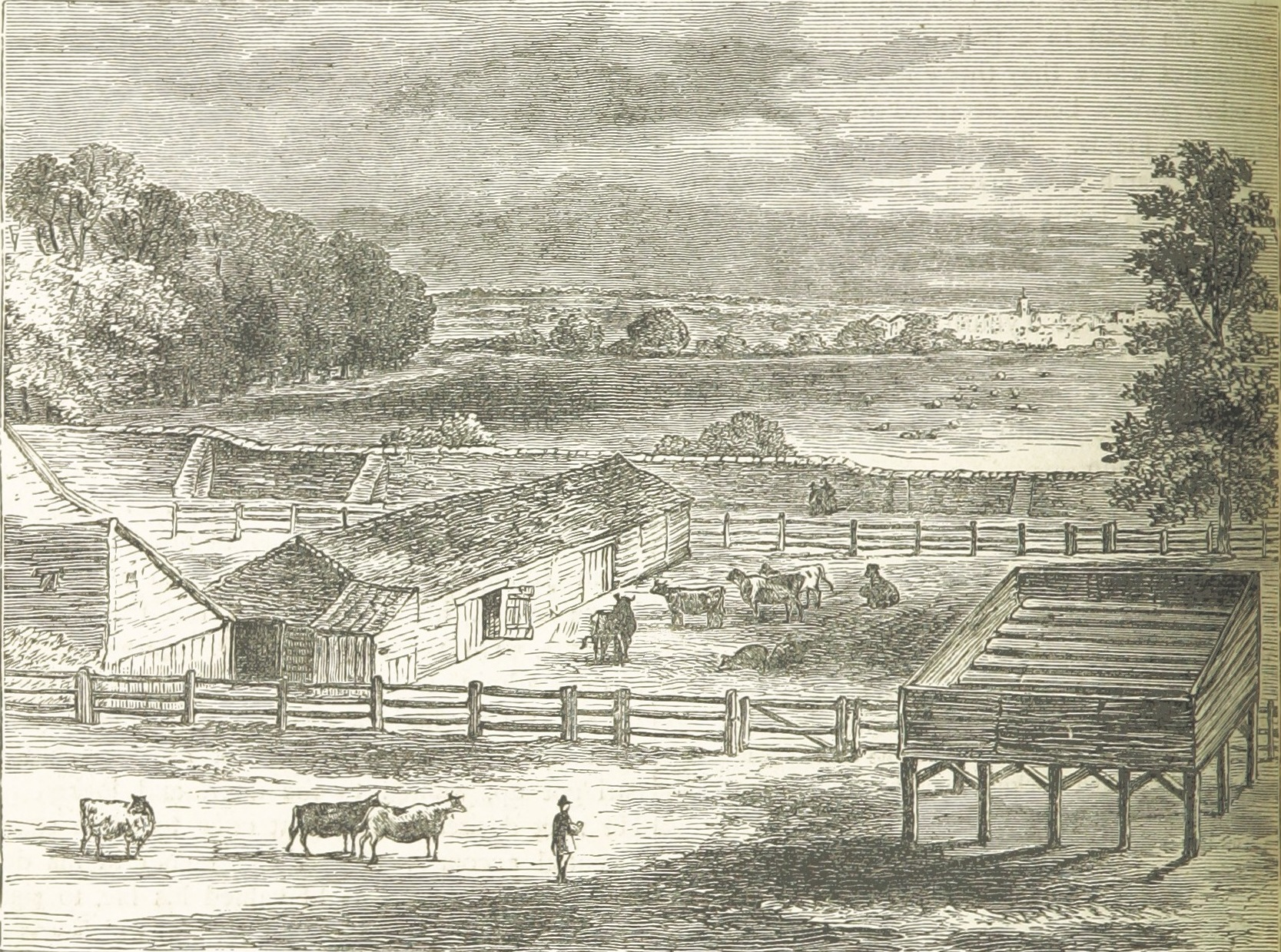
View by William Capon across the second site of Tyburn Gallows on Edgware Road near its junction with Bryanston Street, 1785

William Capon's view from 1785 shows one of three stands for spectators which then remained at the site. Edgware Road is in the foreground. Beyond the paddock is Bayswater Road with Hyde Park behind the wall.

On 19 April 1779, clergyman James Hackman was hanged there following his 7 April murder of courtesan and socialite Martha Ray, the mistress of John Montagu, 4th Earl of Sandwich. The Tyburn gallows were last used on 3 November 1783, when John Austin, a highwayman, was hanged.

Subsequently, hangings were staged outside Newgate prison. Then, in 1868, due to public disorder during these public executions, it was decided to execute the convicts inside the prison.

Stone marking the site of the Tyburn tree on the traffic island at the junction of Edgware Road, Bayswater Road and Oxford Street

The site of the Tyburn Tree is now marked by three young oak trees that were planted in 2014 on a traffic island in the middle of Edgware Road at its junction with Bayswater Road. Between the trees is a roundel with the inscription "The site of Tyburn Tree". It is also commemorated by the Tyburn Convent, a Catholic convent dedicated to the memory of martyrs executed there and in other locations for the Catholic faith.

Although most historical records and modern science agree that the Tyburn Tree used between 1571 and 1759 were situated where Oxford Street meets Edgware Road and Bayswater Road, in the January 1850 issue of Notes and Queries, the book collector and musicologist Edward Francis Rimbault published a list of faults he had found in Peter Cunningham's 1849 Handbook of London, in which he claimed that the correct site of the gallows is where 49 Connaught Square was later built, stating that "in the lease granted by the Bishop of London, this is particularly mentioned".

== Process of executions ==
Tyburn was primarily known for its gallows, which functioned as the main execution site for London-area prisoners from the 16th through to the 18th centuries. For those found guilty of capital crimes who could not obtain a pardon, which accounted for about 40%, a probable destiny was to be hanged at Tyburn. Other contemporary methods of punishment that may have been used as alternatives to Tyburn included execution, followed by being hung in chains at the place where the crime was committed; or burning at the stake; and being drawn and quartered, of which the latter two were common in cases of treason.

The last days of the condemned were marked by religious events. On the Sunday before every execution, a sermon was preached in Newgate's chapel, which those unaffiliated with the execution could pay to attend. Furthermore, the night before the execution, around midnight, the sexton of St Sepulchre's church, adjacent to Newgate, recited verses outside the wall of the condemned. The following morning, the convicts heard prayers, and those who wished to do so received the sacrament.

On the day of execution, the condemned were transported to the Tyburn gallows from Newgate in a horse-drawn open cart. It was about three miles (5 km) from Newgate to Tyburn, but as the streets were often crowded with onlookers, the journey could last up to three hours. The cart usually stopped at the "Bowl Inn" public house in St Giles High Street. This was the "halfway house". Here the condemned were allowed to drink strong liquors, wine or strong ale.

"Here Jack Ketch and the criminal who was about to expiate his offence on the scaffold were wont to stop on their way to the gallows for a 'last glass'. Mr. W. T. Purkiss, the proprietor, however, was prevailed upon to stay the work of demolition for a time".

The draught itself was described in a 19th-century ballad as being of a "nutty brown ale drunk from a 'broad wooden bowl'". At various times the St Giles Bowl appears to have been administered at a number of inns (or perhaps one inn under a number of names) in St Giles, each successively being referred to as "The Bowl". According to Walter Thornbury in his classic London Old and New, "The Bowl" would appear to have become associated with the "Angel Inn" on St Giles High Street. In 1873, the City Press feared that the Angel Inn, another memorial of ancient London, was about to pass away. The Angel was remodelled in 1898 and stands to this day.

Having arrived at Tyburn, the condemned found themselves in front of a crowded and noisy square; the wealthy paid to sit on the stands erected for the occasion, in order to have an unobstructed view. Before the execution, the condemned were allowed to say a few words; the authorities expected that most of the condemned, before commending their own souls to God, would admit their guilt. It is reported that the majority of the condemned did so. A noose was then placed around their neck and the cart pulled away, leaving them hanging.

Instances of pickpocketing have been reported in the crowds of executions, a mockery of the deterrent effect of capital punishment, which at the time was considered proper punishment for theft.

== Social aspects ==
Sites of public executions were significant gathering places and executions were public spectacles. Scholars have described the executions at Tyburn as "carnivalesque occasion[s] in which the normative message intended by the authorities is reappropriated and inverted by an irreverent crowd" that found them a source of "entertainment as well as conflict." This analysis is supported by the presence of shouting street traders and food vendors and the erection of seating for wealthier onlookers. Additionally, a popular belief held that the hand of an executed criminal could cure cancers, and it was not uncommon to see mothers brushing their child's cheek with the hand of the condemned. The gallows at Tyburn were sources of cadavers for surgeons and anatomists.

== Executioners ==
- "The hangman of London", Cratwell, c. 1534 – 1 September 1538
- Thomas Derrick, c. 1608
- Gregory Brandon, 1625 (or earlier) – ?, after whom the phrase the "Gregorian tree" was coined
- Robert Brandon – 1649, "Young Gregory" alongside his father at least part of the period
- Edward Dun
- Jack Ketch, 1663 – early 1686, reinstated briefly in late 1686
- Paskah Rose, 1686 – 28 May 1686
- Richard Pearse, (?) 1686–?
- Unknown or unknowns
- John Price, 1714–16
- William Marvell, 1716 – November 1717
- John Price, 1717–18
- William Marvell, (?) 1718
- Bailiff Banks, ?–1719
- Richard Arnet, 1719 – c. 1726
- John Hooper, ? – March 1735
- John Thrift March 1735 – May 1752
- Thomas Turlis, 1754– 6 February 1771
- Edward Dennis, 1771 – 21 November 1786

== Notable executions ==
Name	Date	Cause
William Fitz Osbert	1196	Citizen of London executed for his role in a popular uprising of the poor in the spring of 1196.
Roger Mortimer, 1st Earl of March	29 November 1330	Accused of assuming royal power; hanged without trial.
Roger Bolingbroke	November 1441	sorcery against Henry VI of England
Sir Thomas Browne, MP, Sheriff of Kent	20 July 1460	Convicted of treason and immediately hanged. Had been knighted by Henry IV and served as Chancellor of the Exchequer between 1440 and 1450 and as Justice of the peace in Surrey from 1454 until his death.
John Stacy (alchemist) and Thomas Burdet	1477	sorcery against Edward IV
Sir Humphrey Stafford of Grafton	8 July 1486	Accused of siding with Richard III; hanged without trial on orders of Henry VII.
Michael An Gof and Thomas Flamank	27 June 1497	Leaders of the 1st Cornish Rebellion of 1497.
Perkin Warbeck	23 November 1499	Treason; pretender to the throne of Henry VII of England by passing himself off as Richard IV, the younger of the two Princes in the Tower. Leader of the 2nd Cornish Rebellion of 1497.
Elizabeth Barton "The Holy Maid of Kent"	20 April 1534	Treason; a nun who unwisely prophesied that King Henry VIII would die within six months if he married Anne Boleyn.
John Houghton	4 May 1535	Prior of the Charterhouse who refused to swear the oath condoning King Henry VIII's divorce of Catherine of Aragon.
Thomas FitzGerald, 10th Earl of Kildare	3 February 1537	Rebel who renounced his allegiance to Henry VIII. On 3 February 1537, the Earl, after being imprisoned for sixteen months, along with five of his uncles, were all executed as traitors at Tyburn, by being hanged, drawn and quartered. The Irish Government, not satisfied with the arrest of the Earl, had written to Thomas Cromwell and it was determined that the five uncles (James, Oliver, Richard, John and Walter) should be arrested also. The sole male representative to the Kildare Geraldines was then smuggled to safety by his tutor at the age of twelve. Gerald FitzGerald, 11th Earl of Kildare (1525–1585), also known as the "Wizard Earl".
Sir Francis Bigod	2 June 1537	Leader of Bigod's Rebellion. Between June and August 1537, the rebellion's ringleaders and many participants were executed at Tyburn, Tower Hill and many other locations. They included Sir John Bigod, Sir Thomas Percy, Sir Henry Percy, Sir John Bulmer, Sir Stephan Hamilton, Sir Nicholas Tempast, Sir William Lumley, Sir Edward Neville, Sir Robert Constable, the abbots of Barlings, Sawley, Fountains and Jervaulx Abbeys, and the prior of Bridlington.
Thomas Fiennes, 9th Baron Dacre	29 June 1541	Lord Dacre was convicted of murder after being involved in the death of a gamekeeper whilst taking part in a poaching expedition on the lands of Sir Nicholas Pelham of Laughton.
Francis Dereham and Sir Thomas Culpeper	10 December 1541	Courtiers of King Henry VIII who were sexually involved with his fifth wife, Queen Catherine Howard. Culpeper and Dereham were both sentenced to be 'hanged, drawn and quartered' but Culpeper's sentence was commuted to beheading at Tyburn on account of his previously good relationship with Henry. (Beheading, reserved for nobility, was normally carried out at Tower Hill.) Dereham suffered the full sentence.
William Leech of Fulletby	8 May 1543	A ringleader of the rebellion called the Pilgrimage of Grace in 1536, Leech escaped to Scotland. He murdered the Somerset Herald, Thomas Trahern, at Dunbar on 25 November 1542, causing an international incident, and was delivered for hanging in London.
Humphrey Arundell	27 January 1550	Leader of the Western Rebellion in 1549 – sometimes known as the Prayer Book Rebellion
Saint Edmund Campion	1 December 1581	Roman Catholic priests.
Ralph Sherwin	1 December 1581	Roman Catholic priests.
Alexander Briant	1 December 1581	Roman Catholic priests.
John Adams	8 October 1586	Roman Catholic priests.
Robert Dibdale	8 October 1586	Roman Catholic priests.
John Lowe	8 October 1586	Roman Catholic priests.
Brian O'Rourke	3 November 1591	Irish lord, harboured and aided the escape of Spanish Armada shipwreck survivors in the winter of 1588. Following a short rebellion he fled to Scotland in 1591, but became the first man extradited within Britain on allegations of crimes committed in Ireland and was sentenced to death for treason.
Robert Southwell	21 February 1595	Roman Catholic priest.
John Felton	29 November 1628	Lieutenant in the English army who murdered George Villiers, 1st Duke of Buckingham, a courtier, statesman, and favorite of King James I.
Philip Powel	30 June 1646	Roman Catholic priests.
Peter Wright	19 May 1651	Roman Catholic priests.
John Southworth	28 June 1654	Roman Catholic priests.
Daniel Axtell	19 October 1660	Colonel in the Parliamentarian army and was in charge of security during the trial of Charles I. For his role in the trial, he was excluded from the Act of Indemnity and Oblivion. After being tried as a regicide, he was hanged, drawn, and quartered.
Oliver Cromwell	30 January 1661	Posthumous execution following exhumation of his body from Westminster Abbey.
Robert Hubert	28 September 1666	Falsely confessed to starting the Great Fire of London.
Claude Duval	21 January 1670	Highwayman.
Saint Oliver Plunkett	1 July 1681	Lord Primate of All Ireland, Lord Archbishop of Armagh and martyr.
Jane Voss	19 December 1684	Robbing on the highway, high treason, murder, and felony.
William Chaloner	23 March 1699	Notorious coiner and counterfeiter, convicted of high treason partly on evidence gathered by Isaac Newton.
Jack Hall	1707	A chimney-sweep, hanged for committing a burglary. There is a folk-song about him, which bears his name (now better known by the name Sam Hall).
Henry Oxburgh	14 May 1716	One of the Jacobite leaders of the 1715 Rebellion.
Jack Sheppard "Gentleman Jack"	16 November 1724	Notorious thief and multiple escapee.
Jonathan Wild	24 May 1725	Organized crime lord.
Arthur Gray	11 May 1748	One of the leaders of the notorious Hawkhurst Gang, a criminal organisation involved in smuggling throughout southeast England from 1735 until 1749.
James MacLaine "The Gentleman Highwayman"	3 October 1750	Highwayman.
Laurence Shirley, 4th Earl Ferrers	1 May 1760	The last peer to be hanged for murder.
Elizabeth Brownrigg	13 September 1767	Murdered Mary Clifford, a domestic servant.
John Rann "Sixteen String Jack"	30 November 1774	Highwayman.
Rev. James Hackman	19 April 1779	Hanged for the murder of Martha Ray, mistress of John Montagu, 4th Earl of Sandwich.
John Austin	3 November 1783	A highwayman, the last person to be executed at Tyburn.

== See also ==
- Thomas Derrick, an executioner at Tyburn
- Carthusian Martyrs of London
- Last dying speeches
- Ordinary of Newgate's Account
