= The Angel, St Giles High Street =

Historic public house in London, England

Coordinates: 51.51550°N 0.12784°W

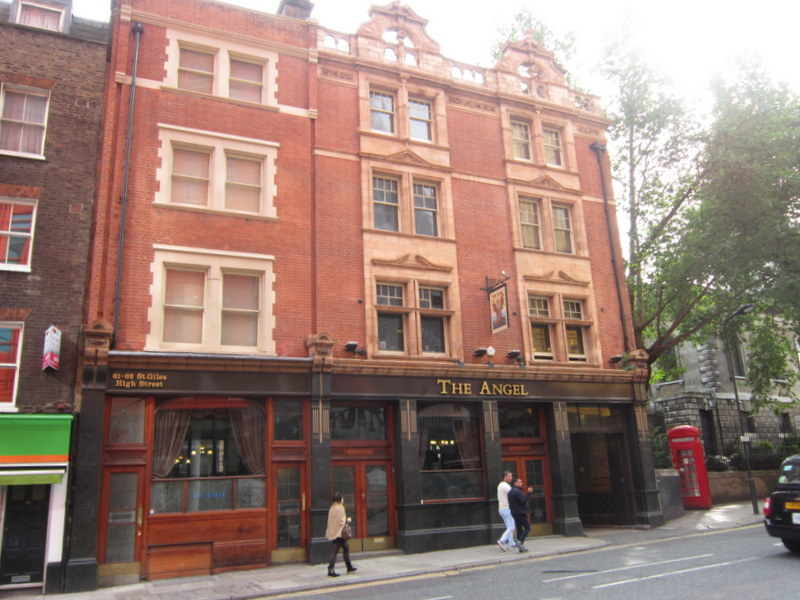
The Angel, St Giles High Street

The Angel is an ancient and historic public house and former coaching inn on St Giles High Street, in the St Giles district of the West End of London.

First mentioned by name on the historical record in 1546, it almost certainly existed on this site from an earlier date as one of the Spittal Houses of the Monastery and Hospital of St Giles.

The pub on this site has been known, formally or informally, by more than one name in its history, with records of it being referred to as "The Bowl" and "The Crown" (not to be confused with the later public house of that name on New Oxford Street).

== History ==
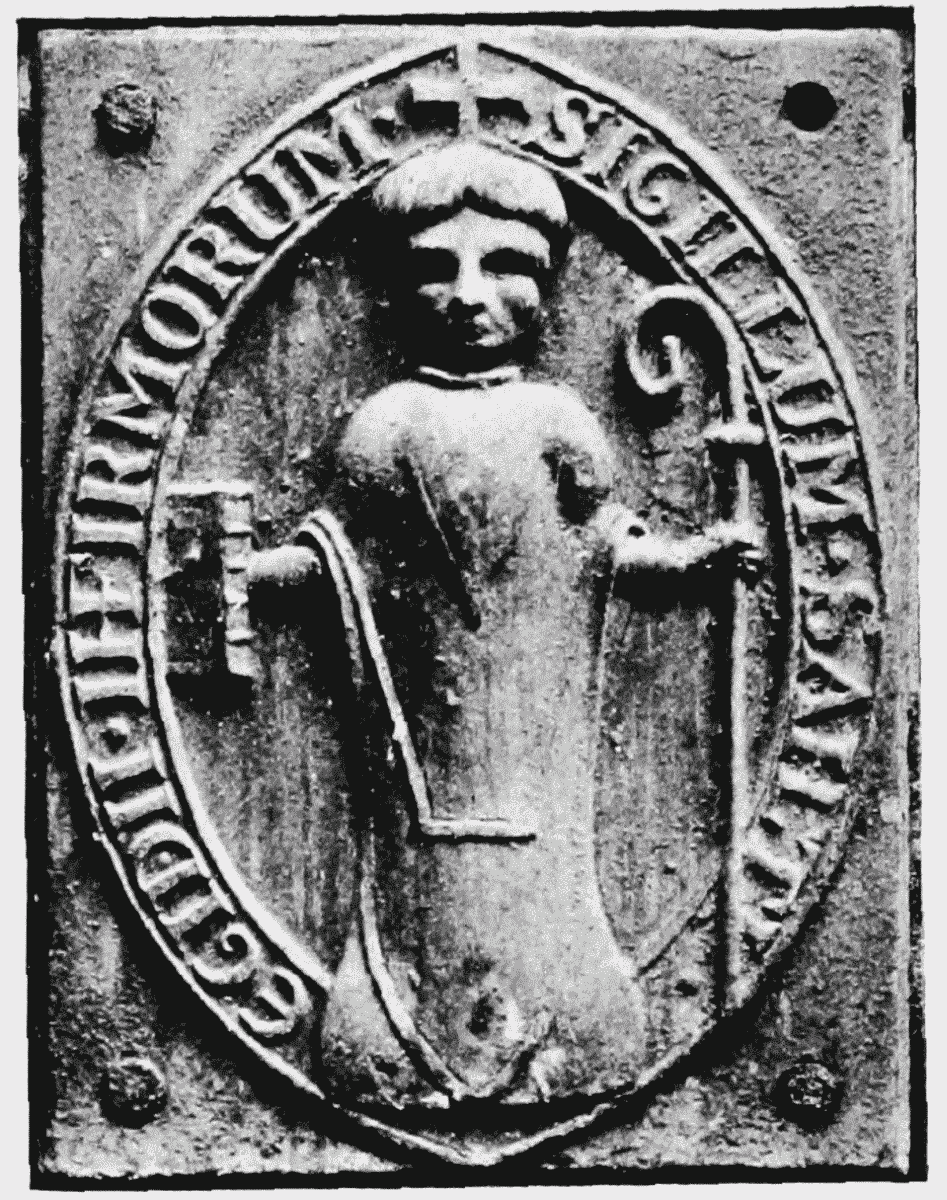
The seal of the Monastery and Hospital of St Giles

The original foundation of 'Angel Inn' is lost in time but it was certainly well established by the middle part of the 16th Century. It originally formed one of the 'Spittal Houses' of the Medieval Hospital of St Giles, these were guest houses for visitors and pilgrims attached to and owned by the hospital and brethren of the Order of St Lazarus of Jerusalem. By choosing to adopt the sign of 'The Angel' the Innkeepers of the day were likely intending to indicate the church ownership of the freehold land and assert the patronage and protection of the powerful neighboring Monastery and Hospital of St Giles.

The pub is first mentioned by name in 1546 on an indenture drawn up at the time of the Dissolution of the Monasteries in England and Wales, when the lands of the Monastery and Hospital of St Giles, including the 'Angel Inn' were divided between Lord Admiral John Dudley, Viscount Lisle, and Dame Joan Legh, widow of Sir Thomas Legh, Henry VIII's notorious 'Visitor of the Monasteries'.

After the Dissolution The Angel was to pass from Miss Katherine Legh, later Lady Mountjoy, through a number of hands in the 16th and 17th Century before, in 1668, coming in to the ownership of the Russell family, later the Dukes of Bedford, with whom it was to remain until the beginning of the 20th Century.

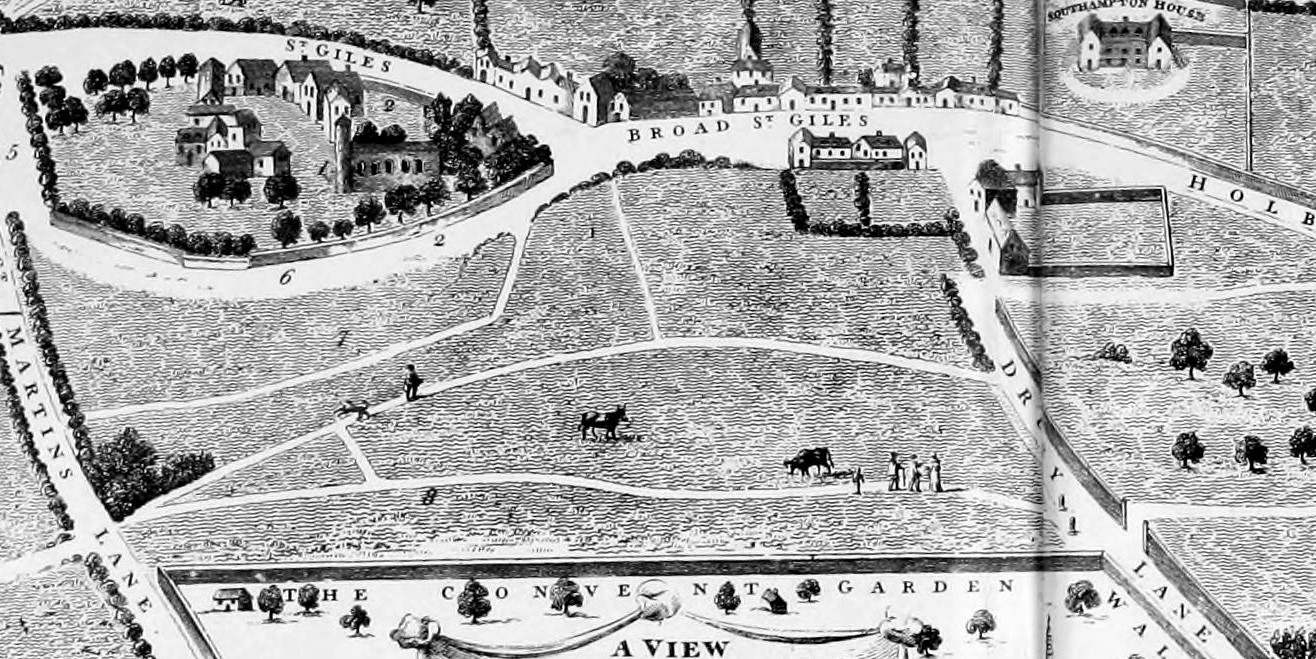
A map of Old St Giles showing the Angel Inn at the north western boundary of the monastery precinct among the Spittal Houses

The Angel Inn would, at that time, have been situated midway between the City of London and the City of Westminster, in open fields, on the road to Tyburn, Oxford and the West Country.

=== The St Giles Bowl ===
By at least the early 15th Century, the chief site of public execution in London was moved from the Elms at Smithfield to the northwest corner of the wall of the Leper Hospital of St Giles The Hermit (now the junction of Flitcroft Street and Denmark Street), where a gallows was erected.

It became the custom of the hospital to present the condemned man with a draught of strong ale, described in a later ballad as a 'broad wooden bowl' of 'nutty brown ale' to ease his passing into the next life; this became known as the 'St Giles Bowl'. After the dissolution of the hospital and the further moving of the site of execution to the newly built triple gallows at Tyburn, the custom was kept up by the churchwardens of St Giles Church at the Angel Inn. The Angel was also informally referred to as 'The Bowl' at this time in its history.

Walter Thornbury was to remark in his 'London Old and New' that "there is scarcely an execution at "Tyburn Tree", recorded in the "Newgate Calendar", in which the fact is not mentioned that the culprit called at a public-house en route for a parting draught".

In 1873, when the Angel was threatened demolition through the road widening schemes then mooted in the parish, the London City Press reported that:

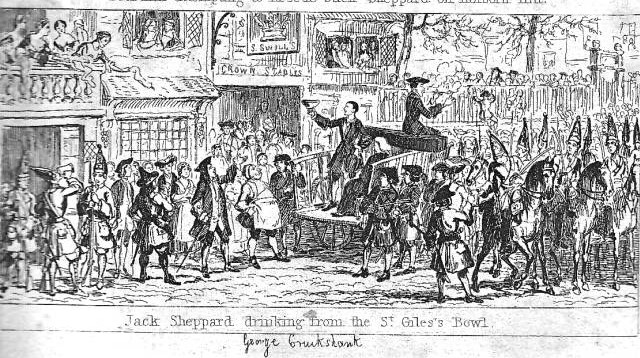
Jack Sheppard at the Angel/Crown Inn at the north western corner of St Giles Churchyard

"another memorial of ancient London was about to pass away, namely, the "Angel" Inn, at St. Giles's, the "half-way house" on the road to Tyburn—the house at which Jack Ketch and the criminal who was about to expiate his offence on the scaffold were wont to stop on their way to the gallows for a "last glass". Mr. W. T. Purkiss, the proprietor, however, was prevailed upon to stay the work of demolition for a time."

Many famous felons and highwaymen took the St Giles Bowl at the sign of the Angel, including John Cottington 'Mulsack' who picked Cromwell's pocket, John Nevison 'Swift-Neck', and 'Handsome' Tom Cox who robbed the Kings Jester, Thomas Killgrew. Perhaps the most famous scene to occur over the St Giles Bowl was the procession of the thief and popular hero 'Honest Jack' Sheppard to Tyburn, accompanied by as many as 200,000 citizens. According to one fictionalised telling, Sheppard refused the Bowl and instead pledged that his persecutor, the corrupt thief taker Jonathon Wild, would taste of the cup within six months. Six months later Wild was executed for theft at Tyburn.

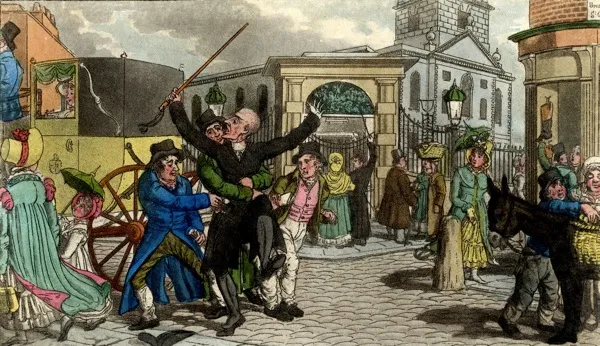
'Dr Syntax, Robbed in St Giles', the churchyard wall of the Angel is shown on the far left. 1820.

The Tyburn gallows were last used on 3 November 1783, when the highwayman John Austin was hanged. For the next eighty-five years hangings were staged outside Newgate prison and the custom of the St Giles Bowl would fall into abeyance.

=== The Rookery pubs of Old St Giles ===
Of the more than thirty Rookery pubs and nearly five hundred gin shops that once crowded Old St Giles, only three now remain: The Angel, The Crown on New Oxford Street, and the Bloomsbury Tavern (formerly the Black Lion). Of these the Angel is by far the oldest established.

While the Angel maintained a varied reputation throughout the 18th and 19th Century the surrounding district and 'Rookery' of St Giles more generally became a byword in London for the very limits of urban squalor and human degradation.

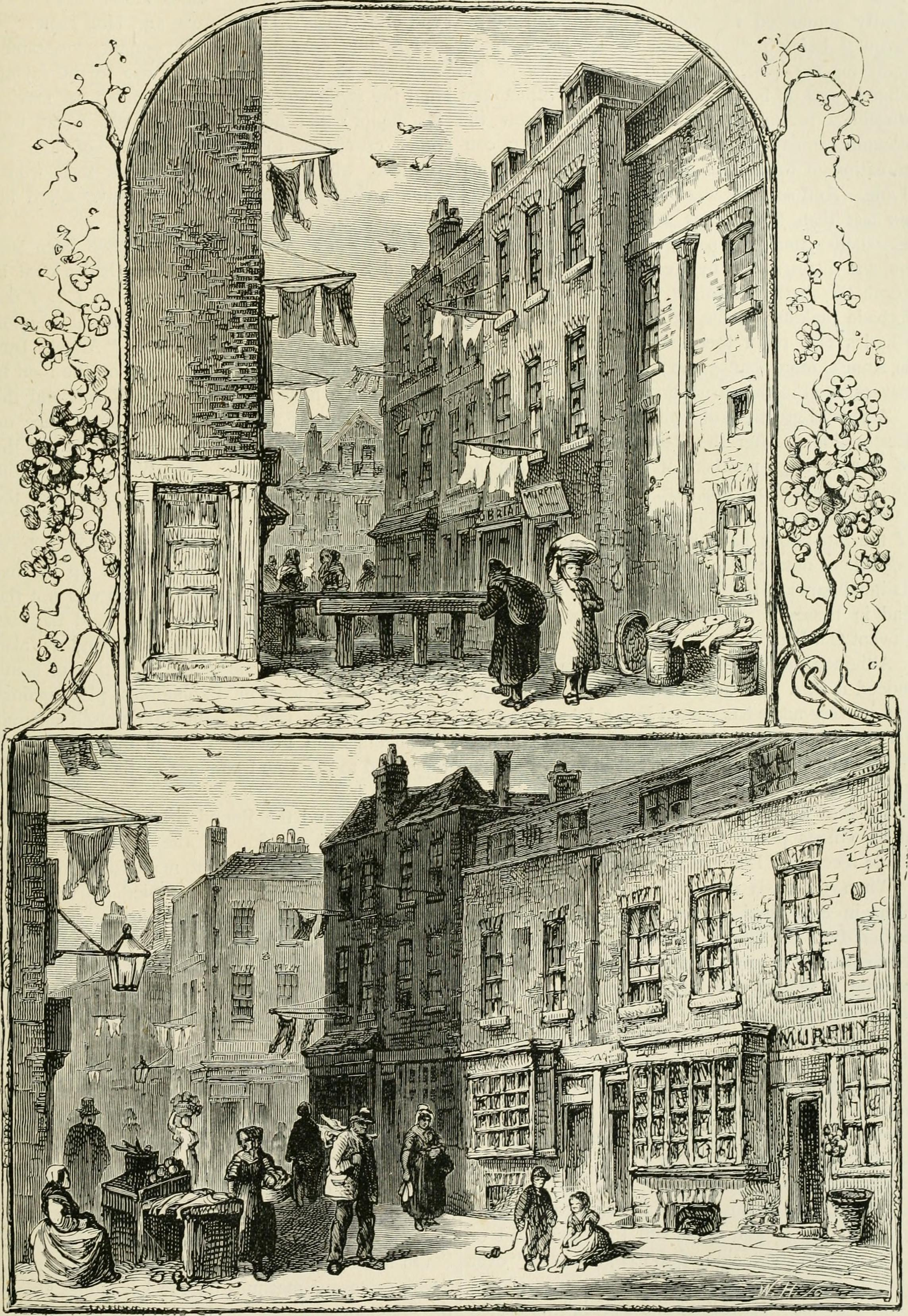
The Rookery of St Giles

The neighbourhood of the Angel Inn at this time has been described by the London historian Peter Ackroyd as having "embodied the worst living conditions in all of London's history; this was the lowest point which human beings could reach".

The area was historically crowded with destitute immigrants, originally French Huguenots, but later home to so many Roman Catholic Irish migrant workers that St Giles became known as the 'Holy Land'. Still later, after the Mansfield Ruling, the rookery became home to a noticeable British black community, known at the time as ‘the St Giles Blackbirds'. This consisted of former slaves, sailors and a number of exiled American Black Loyalists.

The area was well served by pubs and Inn's, although of a low and dubious character and mainly said to be the haunt of gangs of beggars, thieves and pickpockets. Famous among them were the Maidenhead Inn, the Rats Castle, the Turks Head, The Eagle and Child, The Hampshire Hog, and the Angel Inn. Only the Angel remains today.

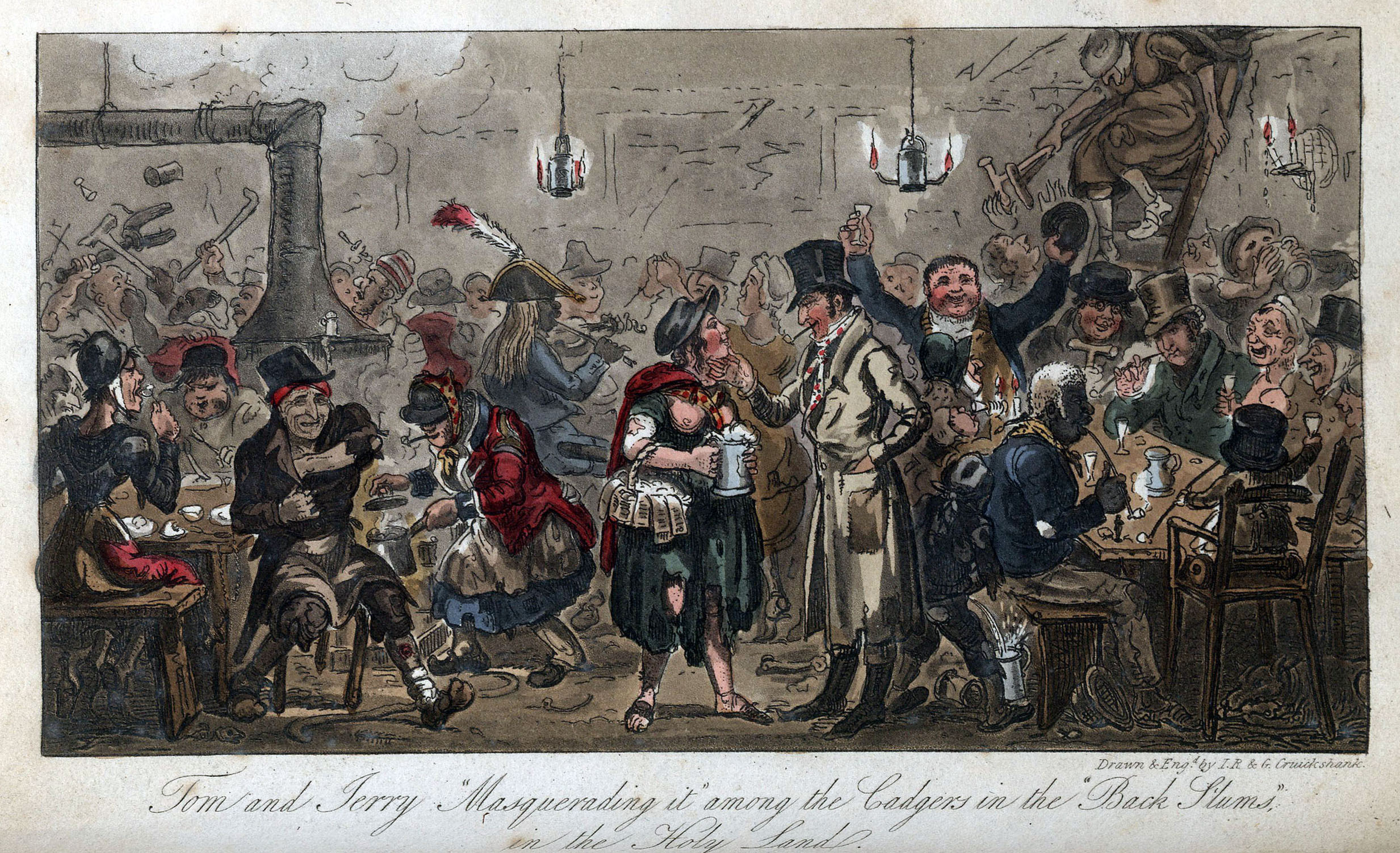
A St Giles Tavern Scene, 1821

Of the Rat's Castle Pub, the Rev. T. Beames, in his 'Rookeries of London', writes : "In the ground floor was a large room, appropriated to the general entertainment of all comers; in the first floor, a free-and-easy, where dancing and singing went on during the greater part of the night, suppers were laid, and the luxuries which tempt to intoxication freely displayed. The frequenters of this place were bound together by a common tie, and they spoke openly of incidents which they had long since ceased to blush at, but which hardened habits of crime alone could teach them to avow."

One rather poignant vignette of the period comes in the Old Bailey trial of the serving man Thomas Ruby. Ruby was put on trial for theft and burglary on 14 May 1741 at the Old Bailey after breaking into the Angel as his former employer, the publican John Tucker, slept in the rooms above. He was recognised in his escape and arrested the next day on Drury Lane. When brought before the Old Bailey, Ruby could offer no defence other than to say:

"I was almost starved with Hunger, and went to Mr. Tucker's with a view of getting some Victuals, thinking I could be bolder there than at another Place.."

Ruby was found guilty and sentenced to death by hanging at Tyburn.

In 1768 the Angel Inn was the meeting house of the Tyrian Lodge of Freemasonry.

=== Victorian refurbishment and later history ===
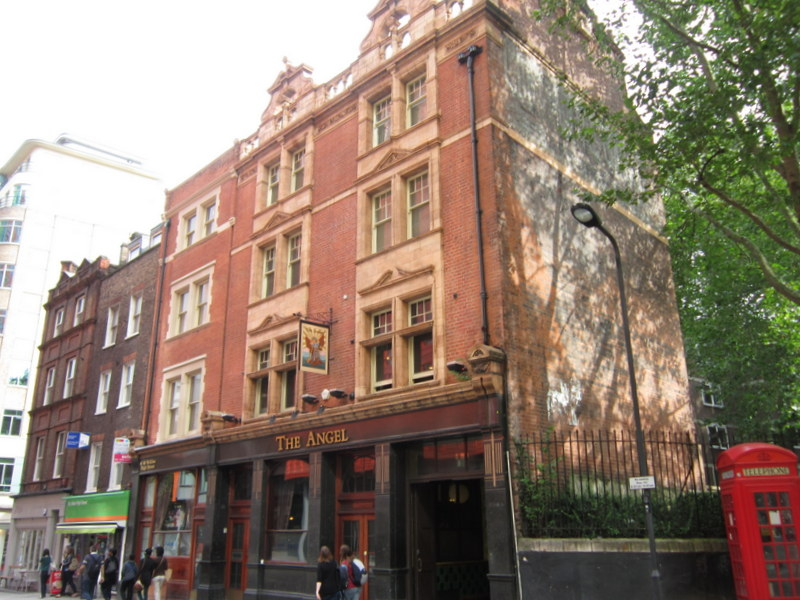
The Angel, showing the carriage entrance into the old stable yard

The Angel Inn ceased to be referred to as an Inn around the year 1850 and became simply 'The Angel'. With the opening of Charing Cross Road and Shaftesbury Avenue there occurred something of an improvement in the aspirations of the local property holders, with the Building News commenting that "Private owners have vied with each other in putting up costly fronts with elevations of imposing height".

Accordingly, in 1898/9, under the Cook family of London publicans, the Angel underwent a complete refurbishment in the High Victorian style. An extra storey appears to have been added and the frontage was entirely redecorated with glazed terracotta casements and Norwegian Emerald Pearl granite pilasters pierced by new acid-etched and cut ornamental glass. Despite the remodelling, the shape and floor plan of the Angel is still demonstrably that of the medieval Inn, even to the point of retaining the entrance to the stable yard as a carriage entrance.

The interior is one of the best preserved historic Victorian public house interiors in London, with CAMRA cataloguing it as a 'A pub interior of outstanding national historic interest', and features a number of working fireplaces, among many exquisite fittings and features, including decorative dark-wood panelling, polished brass, Victorian decorative glass, and a coffered and patterned plaster ceiling in the public bar.

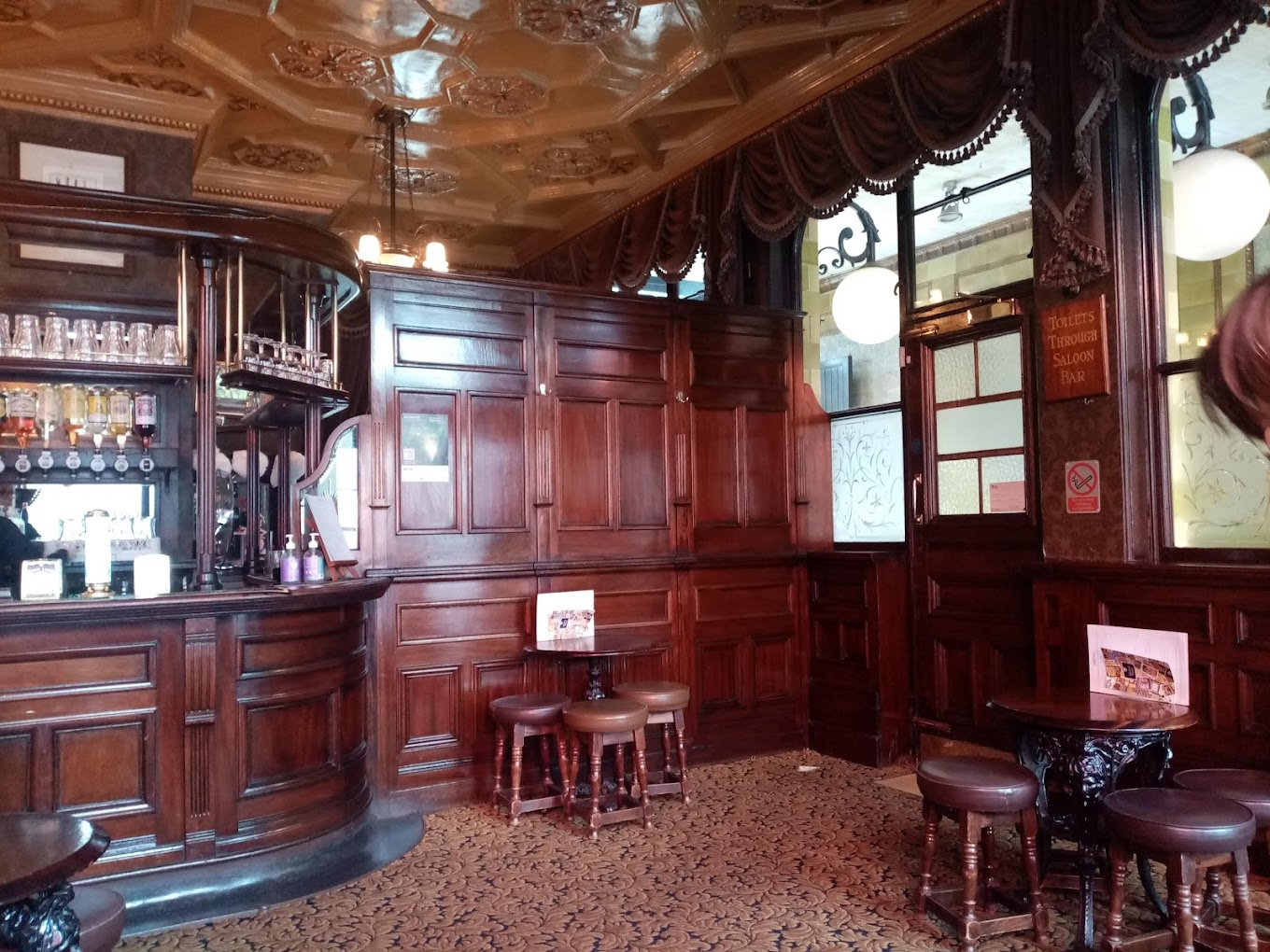
The public bar at the Angel

The saloon bar in the left or east hand bay of the building appears to have been annexed to the Angel in the 1930s and bears many of the hallmarks of public house fittings of that era.

After many years in the hands of Charrington's Brewery, the pub was sold in the 1990s to Samuel Smith's Brewery of Tadcaster, who set about sensitively restoring and reinstating the historical fittings of the pub. At this point the historic partition between the public and saloon bars appears to have been reinstated, creating a rare three-roomed partitioned public house in central London.

Due to its historic proximity to Drury Lane, the pub retains a strong link with the history of London theatre and London Theatreland in general. It is decorated, particularly in the public bar, with signed and framed playbills and posters from many productions, including among others, Derek Jacobi and Pete Postelthwaite in Richard II at the nearby Phoenix Theatre.

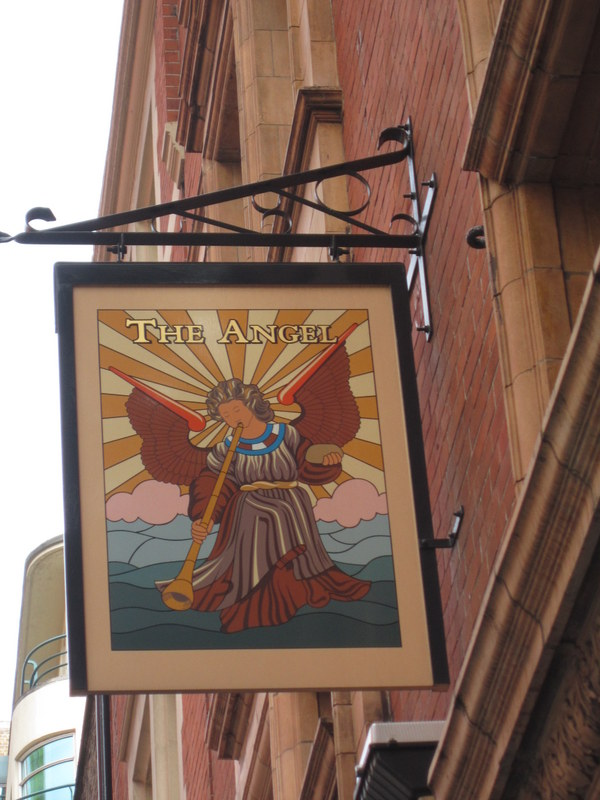
The sign of the Angel

The Angel adheres to the unique rules and usages of the Samuel Smith's Brewery public house estate, whereby digital devices and smart phones are forbidden, along with music and television screens, with a view to encouraging human conversation and conviviality. This is in accordance with the ideal of the perfect pub as described by George Orwell in his 1945 essay "The Moon Under Water".
