= Benjamin Parsons =

English congregational minister

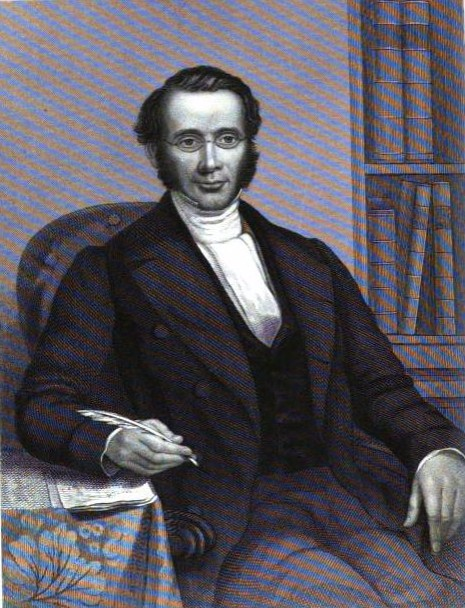
Benjamin Parsons

Benjamin Parsons (1797–1855) was an English congregational minister. He was known as a political campaigner who involved his congregation.

== Life ==
Parsons was born on 16 February 1797 at Nibley in Gloucestershire, the son of Thomas Parsons (died 1803) and Anna Stratford, (died 1812), both from farming families. After attending the parsonage school at Dursley and the grammar school at Wotton-under-Edge, he was apprenticed for seven years to a tailor at Frampton-on-Severn.

In 1815 Parsons became a teacher at as Sunday-school set up at Frampton. He joined the church in the Countess of Huntingdon's Connexion at Rodborough Tabernacle in 1821, and on 8 September that year entered Cheshunt College. After occupying a pulpit in Swansea for nine months in 1825, and a short stay at Rochdale, he was ordained to the church at Ebley, near Stroud in Gloucestershire, in August 1826.

A chapel had been built at Ebley in 1797, but there was no school. Parsons lectured to a male audience in the evenings, established a night-school in a smalle chapel at Paken Hill, and started a provident fund in 1832. A day-school was opened in 1840. To support himself and his family he also kept a school in the parsonage.

Parsons preached at Ebley for the last time, in poor health, on 24 October 1854. He died on 10 January 1855, and was buried at Ebley. A memorial sermon was preached by Edwin Paxton Hood, at Nibley and Ebley.

== Views ==
Parsons was an abolitionist ahead of the Slavery Abolition Act 1833, and supported the "six points" of Chartism. He became an opponent of the Corn Laws, bringing forward a motion in 1841 at an Anti-Corn Law League conference. His three main causes as an activist were education of on the voluntary system (as opposed to state education), the temperance movement, and observance of the Sabbath.

== Works ==
Parsons in his writings used humour and sarcasm. According to Boos, he "identified with working-class interests, especially popular education, and had a flare for pithy and inventive arguments". He published:

- Why have you become a Pædobaptist? A Dialogue between Hezekiah Hastie, a baptist, and Simon Searche, a Pædobaptist (under the pseudonym John Bull), Stroud, 1835.
- Anti-Bacchus, London, 1840; New York, 1840 (edited by John Marsh); London, 1843.
- The Wine Question Settled, London, 1841.
- The Mental and Moral Dignity of Women, London, 1842, 1849, 1856. Argues for equal female education.
- Education, the Birthright of every Human Being, London, 1845; Leeds, 1864 (4th ed.).
- A Short Memoir of Elizabeth P. Parsons (his daughter), Stroud, 1845.
- Buy the Truth and sell it not, London, 1846.
- The Unconstitutional Character of the Government Plan of Education, London, 1847?
- Tracts for Fustian Jackets and Smock Frocks,’Stroud, issued in penny numbers from the summer of 1847 to early in 1849.
- A Letter to the Clergy of the Borough of Stroud, Stroud, 1847?
- The Greatness of the British Empire, London, 1851 (lectures on English history delivered at Ebley, Stroud, and Cheltenham). In Cassell's Library.
- A Letter to Richard Cobden on the Impolicy … of State Education, London, 1852.
- A Letter to the Earl of Derby on the Cruelty and Injustice of opening the Crystal Palace on the Sabbath, London, 1853.

Parsons also worked during the 1850s on the editorial staff of The Working Man's Friend and Family Instructor for John Cassell.

== Family ==
Parsons married, on 3 November 1830, Amelia, daughter of Samuel Fry of Devonport. They had several children, including Anna Shatford Lloyd. Anna became a school principal and her daughter Martha Lloyd took over from her when she died. Benjamin was a strong advocate for the education of women. His daughter was taught at the school at his house.

== Notes ==
Attribution

This article incorporates text from a publication now in the public domain: Lee, Sidney, ed. (1895). "Parsons, Benjamin". Dictionary of National Biography. Vol. 43. London: Smith, Elder & Co.
