= Wales & McCulloch =

Victorian watch and clock retailer in London

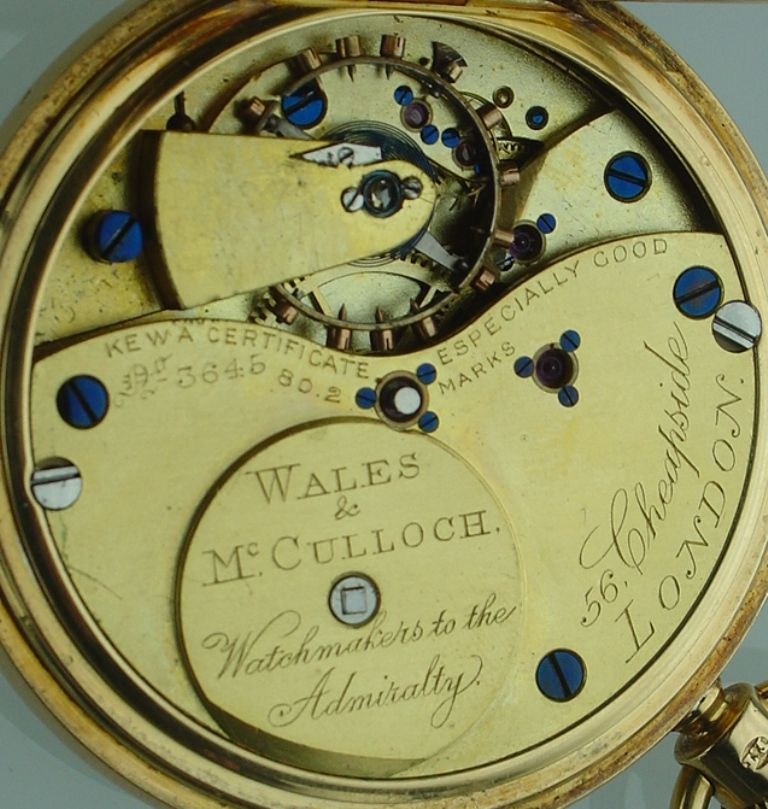
Wales & McCulloch. Watchmakers to the Admiralty. 56 Cheapside, London. Kew A Certificate Especially Good.

Wales & McCulloch were a clock, watch, musical box and jewellery manufacturer and retailer based around Ludgate Hill, London. Historically, this was a prominent location for various watchmakers and jewellers. During the 19th and early 20th centuries, it was a hub for the watchmaking industry, with many notable watchmakers and retailers having their businesses there.

== Chronology ==
Wales & McCulloch were established circa 1853 and operated until 1908 when they incorporated as Wales & McCulloch Ltd, trading until 1934.

Henry Charles Wales was first recorded at his 'manufactory', 32 Ludgate Street, City, EC, from where in 1854 Wales & McCulloch (otherwise known as M'Culloch) advertised as a musical box repository, direct importers of Nicole Frère's celebrated musical boxes.

By 1860 they had taken additional premises at 56 Cheapside, EC, from where they advertised 'To be sold, for £33 8s., a superb and very costly Silver Tea and Coffee Service, adorned with richest chasing and gilt inside. Weight, 75oz, and 'Superb Gilt Drawing-Room Clocks, at £5 5s.; elegant variegated marble Clocks, at £3 3s. The choicest stock in London... next door to Bow Church.'

By 1897 Wales & McCulloch, whose partners are recorded as Henry Charles Wales and Walter Wales, are listed at 20 Ludgate Hill and 56 Cheapside, EC, where they are listed as watch manufacturers, jewellers, diamond merchants, silversmiths and importers of French musical boxes. H.C. Wales died in 1906 leaving an estate of £10,6455.

Thereafter the partners in Wales & McCulloch were W. Wales and Elizabeth Wales; the firm was registered on 8 August 1908 as a limited liability company under the style of Wales & McCulloch Ltd, with Watson Raeburn, E.H. Wales and J.C. Biggs as directors. The company eventually closed in 1934.

Henry Charles Wales lived at Elm Cottage, Halstead Hill, Cheshunt, Hertfordshire in 1859, and Broxbourne, Hertfordshire between 1899 and 1901. Walter Wales lived in Brentwood, Essex between 1899 and 1901.

== Locations ==
Wales & McCulloch traded from a few different locations over their approximately 80 year history.

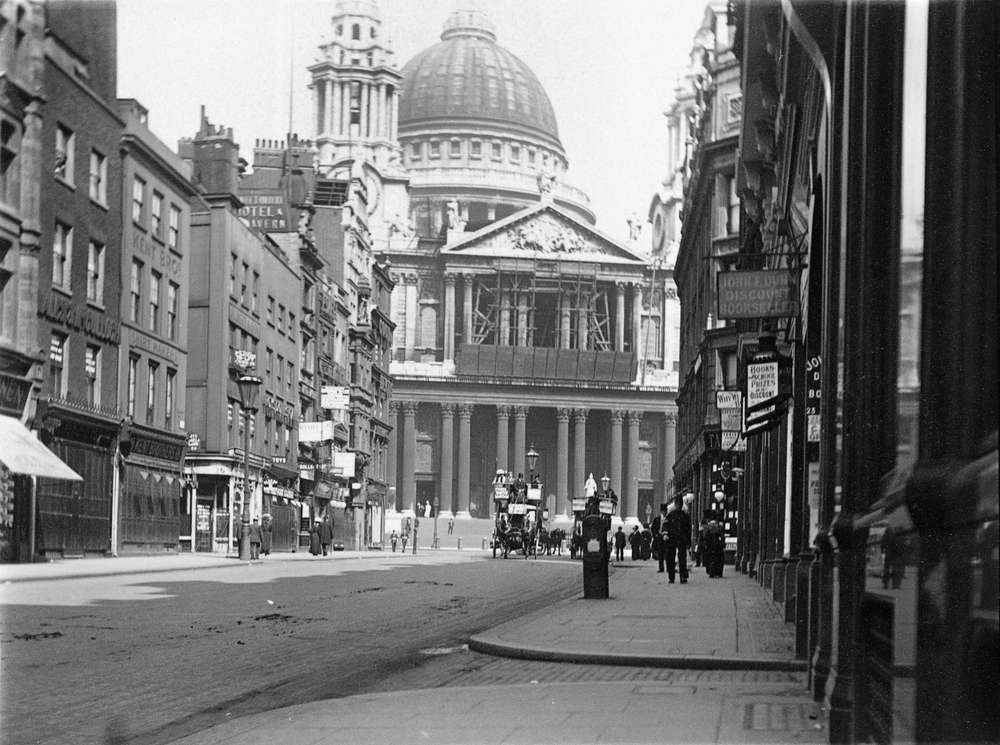
Wales & McCulloch at Ludgate Hill, 3 June 1906

In 1862, they are recorded as trading from 56 Cheapside, London, E.C. Later in 1885, they are recorded as trading from 20 & 22 Ludgate Hill, London, E.C. This address had disappeared from advertising by circa 1918. By 1893/4, they are recorded as trading from 6 Cheapside, London, E.C. and by circa 1910, they are recorded as trading from 193 Victoria Street, London, S.W.1. Finally in 1915, they are recorded as trading from 56 Cheapside, London E.C.2
