= Martha Lloyd (principal) =

English school principal

- Born: September 7, 1860; Stroud
- Died: August 24, 1943 (aged 82); St Ives, Huntingdonshire
- Occupation: Head teacher
- Parent: Anna Lloyd

Martha Lloyd (7 September 1860 – 24 August 1943) was a third generation English school principal. In her spare time she was a mountaineer and a director of the London Missionary Society.

== Life ==
Lloyd was born in the parish of Ebley near Stroud in 1860 to Anna Lloyd and her husband. Her grandfather was Benjamin Parsons who had founded and led schools. She was educated at her mother's school, but a university education was denied her because of the cost (although her brother did attend Cambridge University).

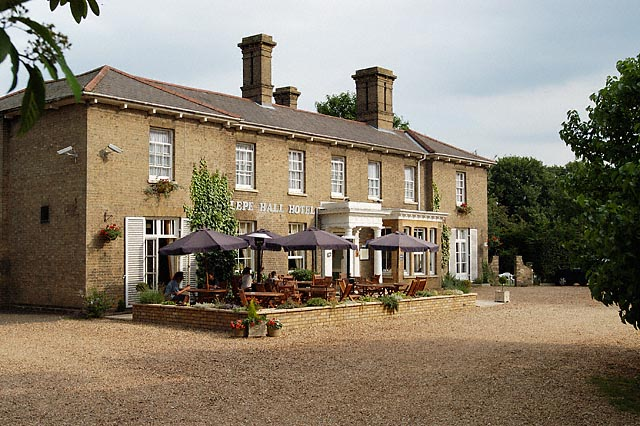
Slepe Hall became a hotel after the school closed

Lloyd was an early member of the Ladies' Alpine Club which was based in London. She was the first woman to climb the Sudlenspitze., This mountain had been first climbed by Alexander Burgener in 1870. She and her mother supported the London Missionary Society and Martha was a director for many years.

Her mother and father had bought Slepe Hall School in St Ives, Huntingdonshire. In time Martha became co-principal. When her mother died on 17 November 1912 she ran the school until she retired in 1928.

Lloyd died in St Ives, Huntingdonshire.
