= Paskah Rose =

English executioner (died 1686)

Paskah Rose (died 28 May 1686), also known as Pascha Rose, was an English executioner briefly during 1686, successor to Jack Ketch.

Rose was a butcher by trade. He had been Ketch's assistant during the period of the Bloody Assizes. When Ketch was imprisoned for "affronting" a London sheriff, Rose was appointed in his place. A few months after taking over Rose was arrested for robbery, after he and another man had broken into the house of a William Barnet and stolen "a Cambler coat and other apparrel". He was hanged at Tyburn on 28 May 1686, following which Ketch was reinstated for the remaining few months of his life.
