= Bell Savage Inn =

Former pub in the City of London

Coordinates: 51°30′51″N 0°6′13″W

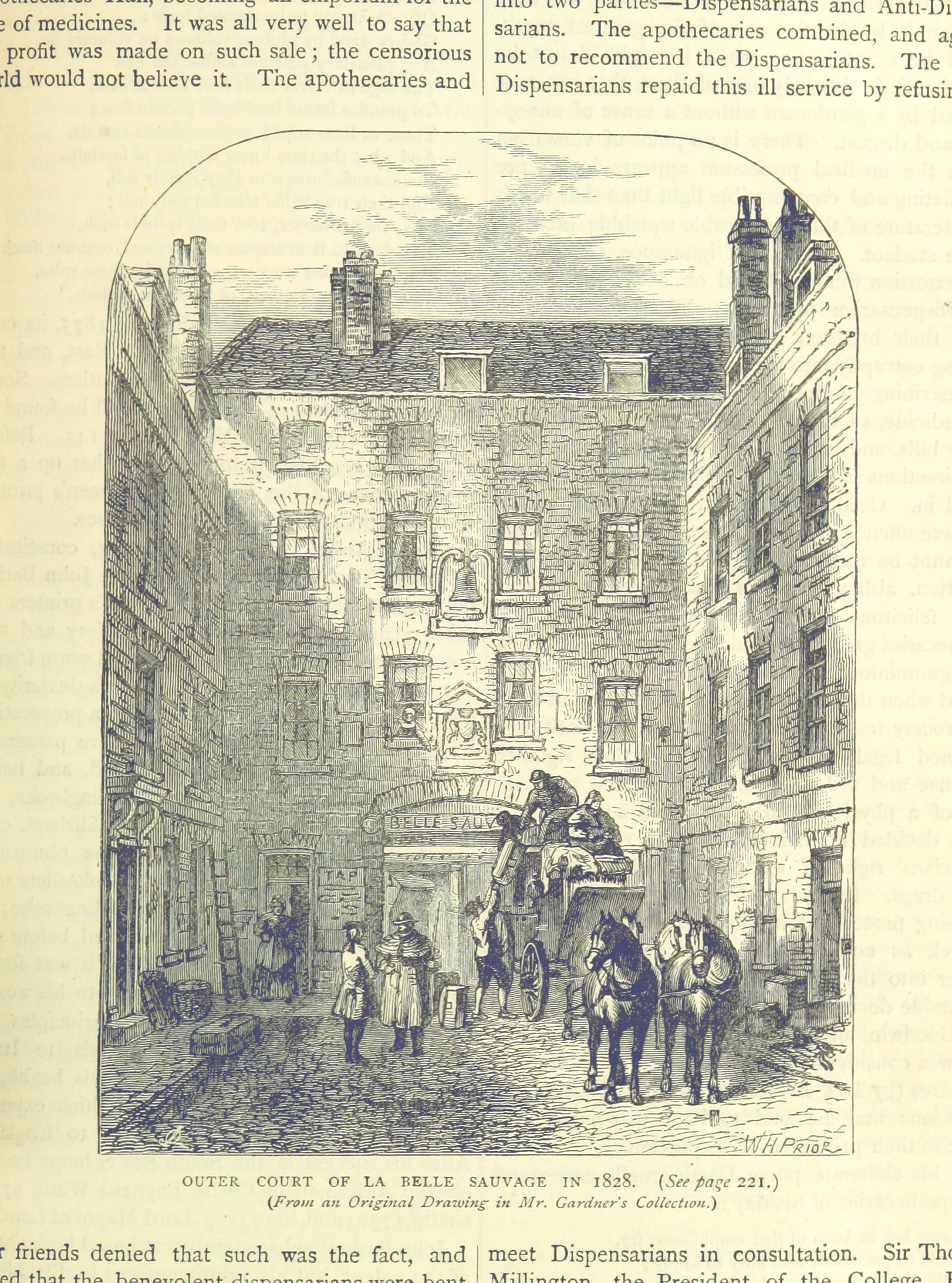
Outer Court of La Belle Sauvage in 1828 (W. H. Prior)

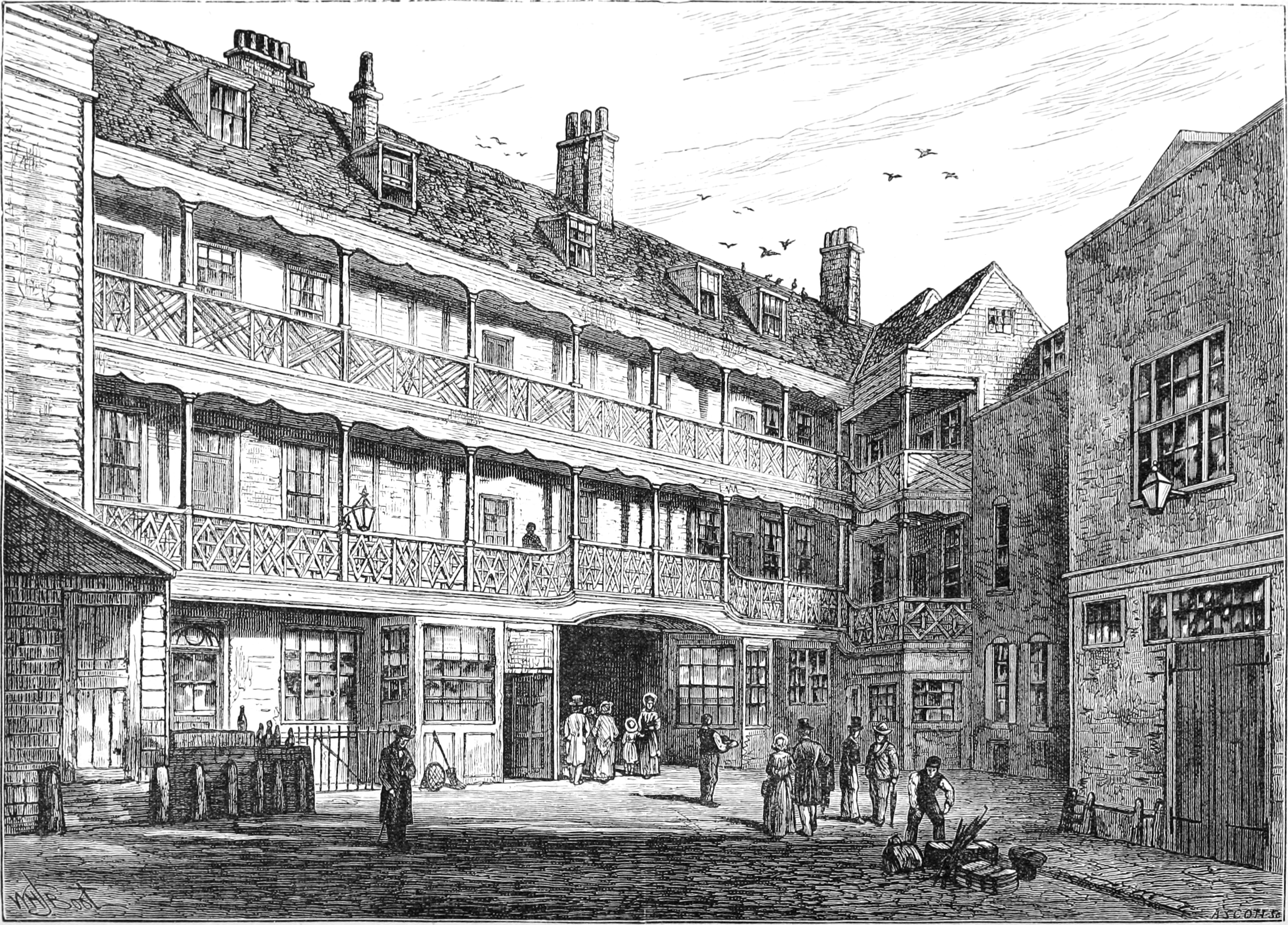
The Bell Savage Inn – inner courtyard

The Bell Savage Inn was a public house in London, England, from the 15th century to 1873, originally located on the north side of what is now Ludgate Hill, in the City of London. It was a playhouse during the Elizabethan Era, as well as a venue for various other entertainments. It was also an important coaching inn. Other names by which it has been known throughout history include: Savage's Inn, The Bel Savage, Belle Savage, Belle Sauvage, Bell on the Hoop, Old Bell Savage, Belly Savage and others.

== History ==
=== 15th century ===
Written records allow the Inn's history to be traced back to at least 1420. In 1453 (in the reign of Henry VI), a deed gave the building's name (in translation) as "Savage's Inn" or "The Bell on the Hoop" and located within the parish of St. Bridget (Bride) in Fleet Street. "Savage" is thought to be the name of a former, perhaps the original, proprietor; a William Savage, who was recorded as having resided in Fleet Street in 1380, has been suggested as a possibility, which, would date the inn back to at least some time in the 14th century.

The alternative name "Bell on the Hoop" may be explained by the fact that both symbols have commonly been used on English Inn signs of the period – the "hoop" refers to a garland of Ivy. The later name, "Bell Savage", could have arisen as a linguistic inversion of "Savage's Bell". Also in the past it was rumored to be derived from the French phrase belle sauvage, but Hensleigh Wedgwood considered that interpretation with scepticism.

=== 16th century ===
In 1554, it is recorded that Sir Thomas Wyatt, leader of a popular revolt against Queen Mary, and his men, "came to Bell Savage, an Inn nigh unto Lud gate", but the gate was closed to prevent the rebels entering the City of London. Hence Wyatt "rested him awhile upon a stall over against the Bell Savage gate". Shortly afterwards he surrendered at Temple Bar.

In 1568, the Inn was bequeathed to the Cutlers' Company, an old City trade guild, for the purpose of exhibitions at Oxford and Cambridge and the benefit of the poor of the parish of St. Bride's. At this time the property consisted of two courts: The entrance to the outer court was via an archway leading from the north side of Ludgate Hill; the entrance to the inner court was through another archway directly opposite the first. The Inn itself was the building surrounding the inner court, which was overlooked by two tiers of covered balconies, from which the guest rooms were accessed.

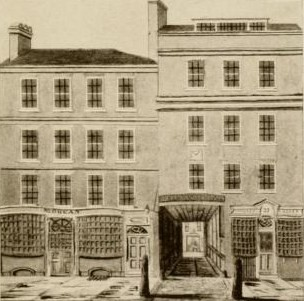
Archway to the Bell Savage Yard from Ludgate Hill, 1782

The Bell Savage was one of the four inns of London that were used as playhouse in the late 16th century – in this case from 1575. The balconies surrounding the inner court served as the upper and lower circles, the rooms of the Inn became private "boxes" and the yard itself was the "pit". The stage would have been built against one side of the yard and curtained off. Richard Tarlton, the well-known comedian, performed here. The inner courtyard of the Inn was also used for public displays of fencing from the mid-1560s to 1589, and as these displays took place on a stage it is quite possible that dramas could also have been enacted at this earlier period. The showman William Bankes and his trick horse "Marocco" performed here. Bear-baiting also took place in the latter half of the 16th century.

=== 17th century ===
In 1616, Pocahontas and her retinue, who had come over from Virginia, were boarded at the Bell Savage. The yard at this time was said to be the "haunt of thieves and conmen....noisy, dangerous and evil-smelling". In the Great Fire of 1666 the Inn was burnt to the ground, but rebuilt afterwards some time prior to 1676. In the outer court were some private houses; Grinling Gibbons lived here for a period before 1677, and the quack Richard Rock also resided here. In 1684, the inn was advertising a "Rhynoceros, lately brought from the East Indies" which could be seen by the public for a small fee – the first rhinoceros to be exhibited in England. Among the people to view it was Francis North, 1st Baron Guilford, Lord Keeper of the Great Seal.

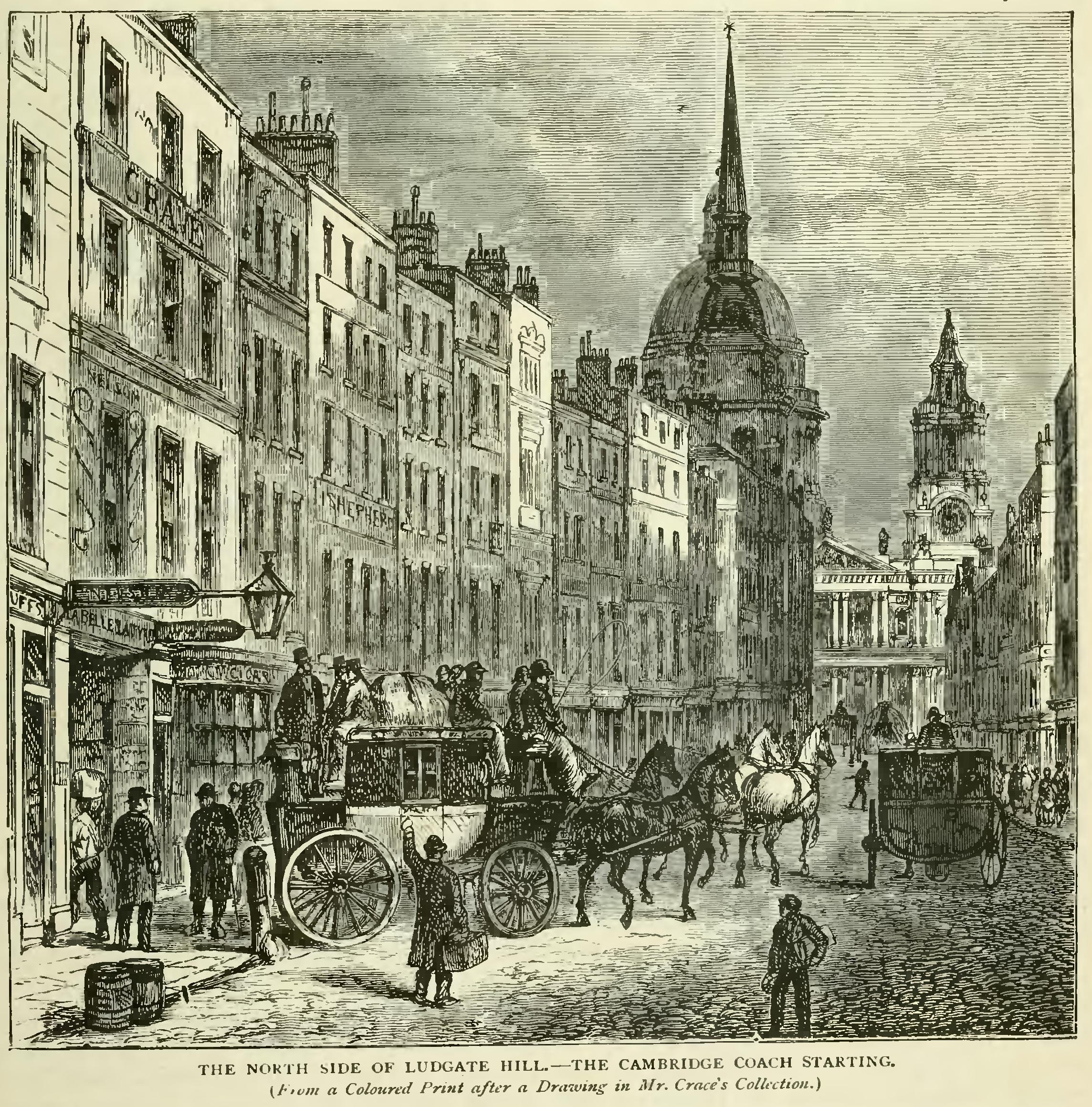
Coach emerging from the "Belle Sauvage" yard into Ludgate Hill

The Bell Savage was an important coaching inn from at least the reign of Charles II, and probably long before; a newspaper advertisement in 1674 states that the Inn had 40 rooms for guests and stabling for 100 horses.

=== 18th–19th centuries ===
The Inn declined with the growth of the railways and by the mid 19th century, parts had become very dilapidated. During the Great Exhibition of 1851, a John Thorburn, took out a lease on part or all of the property and refurbished the accommodation for paying guests. In 1852, John Cassell's publishing house and printing works moved into part of the premises. This adversely affected the hotel business as the noise and vibration from the presses disturbed guests. In 1853, Cassell took over the rest of the property from Thorburn – to the latter's relief.

During Cassell's tenure, the yard was progressively rebuilt; the Inn was finally demolished in 1873 to make way for a railway viaduct. No visible trace now remains. The Cassell & Company's building was called La Belle Sauvage prior to 1914.

== The Bell Savage in art and literature ==
The Bell Savage featured in Dickens's Pickwick Papers, Sir Walter Scott's Kenilworth. and in Samuel Richardson's Clarissa. Amongst artists who drew or painted the inn were: Robert Laurie (1755–1836), Thomas Hosmer Shepherd, George Shepherd, John Maggs (1819–1896), and Charles Jameson Grant (fl. 1831–1846). La Belle Sauvage is the name of the first part of Philip Pullman's planned trilogy The Book of Dust. It is also the name of the boat featured in that book.

== Bibliography ==
- Shelley, Henry C. Inns and taverns of old London (Boston: L.C. Page, 1909).
- Cassell and Company. The story of the House of Cassell (1922)
