= Jack Ketch =

English executioner (died 1686)

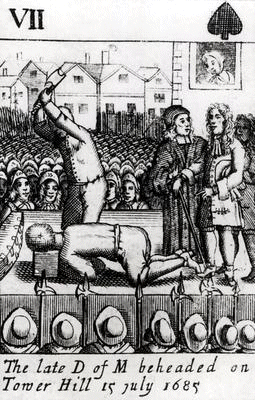
- James Scott, 1st Duke of Monmouth's execution, on Tower Hill, by Jack Ketch, on 15 July 1685, on a playing card.
- Born: John Ketch
- Died: November 1686
- Years active: c.1663–1686

John Ketch (died November 1686) was an infamous English executioner employed by King Charles II. He became famous through the way he performed his duties during the tumults of the 1680s, when he was often mentioned in broadsheet accounts that circulated throughout the Kingdom of England. He is thought to have been appointed in 1663.

He executed the death sentences against William Russell, Lord Russell, in Lincoln's Inn Fields on 21 July 1683, and James Scott, 1st Duke of Monmouth, on 15 July 1685, after the Monmouth Rebellion. Ketch's notoriety stems from "barbarity at the execution of Lord Russell, the Duke of Monmouth, and other political offenders".

Because of his botched executions, the name "Jack Ketch" is used as a proverbial name for death, Satan, and executioners.

== Appointment ==
Ketch took office in 1663, succeeding the late Edward Dun, to whom he had been apprenticed. He is first mentioned in the Proceedings of the Old Bailey for 14 January 1676, although no printed notice of the new hangman occurred until 2 December 1678, when a broadside appeared called The Plotters Ballad, being Jack Ketch's incomparable Receipt for the Cure of Traytorous Recusants and Wholesome Physick for a Popish Contagion. (Note: "On the top of the sheet is a woodcut, in which is represented Edward Coleman [q. v.] drawn in a sledge to the place of execution, exclaiming, 'I am sick of a traytorous disease,' while Jack Ketch, with a hatchet in one hand and a rope in the other, is saying, 'Here's your cure, sir.' ")

In 1679, there appears from another pamphlet purporting to be written by Ketch himself, and entitled The Man of Destiny's Hard Fortune, that the hangman was confined for a time in the Marshalsea prison, "whereby his hopeful harvest was like to have been blasted."

A short entry in the autobiography of Anthony à Wood for 31 August 1681 describes how Stephen College was hanged in the Castle Yard, Oxford, "and when he had hanged about half an hour, was cut down by Catch or Ketch, and quartered under the gallows, his entrails were burnt in a fire made by the gallows." (Note: "[Aug.] 31. Wednesday at 11. Stephen College, born at Watford in Hertfordshire, nephew to Edmund College of St. Peter's in the Bayly, suffered death by hanging in the castle yard Oxon, and when he had hanged about half an hour was cut down by Catch or Ketch, and quartered, under the gallows, his entrails were burnt in a fire made by the gallows. He spoke and prayed more than half an hour, his body was, after quartering, put into a coffin, and the same day was conveyed to London, and buried privately the Thursday following at night in St. Gregory's church near St. Paul's.")

== Lord Russell's execution ==
On that occasion, Ketch wielded the instrument of death either with such sadistically nuanced skill or with such lack of simple dexterity – nobody could tell which – that the victim suffered horrifically under blow after blow, each excruciating but not in itself lethal. Even among the bloodthirsty throngs that habitually attended English beheadings, the gory and agonizing display had created such outrage that Ketch felt moved to write and publish a pamphlet titled Apologie, in which he excused his performance with the claim that Lord Russell had failed to "dispose himself as was most suitable" and that he was therefore distracted while taking aim on his neck.

Ketch was paid by Russell beforehand, as it was customary for those sentenced to death by beheading (which in those days was "reserved for ... aristocrats") to tip the public executioner in advance. It was hoped this would encourage him to do a swift and efficient job, hopefully despatching the victim in one clean blow." In spite of this, Ketch allegedly "did such a bad job that, after the axe hit the side of Russell's head, Russell looked up at him and said, 'You dog, did I give you ten guineas to use me so inhumanely?'" However, in the pamphlet purportedly authored by him, Ketch "repudiated" the claims that Russell had paid him twenty guineas the night before the execution (although he stated it was "true I receav'd 10. Guenies" from him on the scaffold), that Russell had insulted him, and that he had struck Russell's shoulder rather than his head. Although biographer Sidney Lee asserts that the pamphlet was "probably written by Ketch himself", author Stephen Wade describes the provenance of The Apology of John Ketch Esq. as "questionable", since we have "no accurate notion of who wrote" it. He argues that "it may well have been what we would now call a 'ghost writer' out to make a few groats by fabricating a biography of a notorious public figure."

== James Scott, 1st Duke of Monmouth's execution ==
He [the duke] would not make use of a cap or other circumstance, but lying down, bid the fellow to do his office better than to the late Lord Russell, and gave him gold; but the wretch made five chops before he had his head off; which so incensed the people, that had he not been guarded and got away, they would have torn him to pieces.

== Later life and death ==
In January 1686, Ketch was committed to Bridewell Prison for "affronting" a sheriff. His assistant, Paskah Rose, formerly a butcher, took his place. However, on 28 May, following his conviction for robbery, Rose himself was hanged at Tyburn, and Ketch was reinstated. Ketch died in November 1686. Ketch's wife is reported to have said, "That any bungler might put a man to death, but that her husband only knew how to make a Gentleman die sweetly."

== Fiction ==
In 1836, a fictitious autobiography of Ketch, with illustrations from designs by Meadows entitled The autobiography of Jack Ketch, was published. Another book entitled Life of Jack Ketch with Cuts of his own Execution was furnished by Tom Hood for the Duke of Devonshire's library at Chatsworth.

Jack Ketch is one of the characters in Giovanni Piccini (d. 1835) The Tragical Comedy or Comical Tragedy of Punch and Judy as dictated to John Payne Collier, in 1828. He is mentioned in the Charles Dickens novels Oliver Twist, Dombey and Son, The Pickwick Papers, and David Copperfield, and in the C. M. Kornbluth science fiction story "The Marching Morons" (1951). More recently, Jack Ketch plays a role in Neal Stephenson's 2003 and 2004 volumes Quicksilver and The System of the World, the first and last volumes, respectively, in his The Baroque Cycle series (though the last volume is set in 1714, well after the death of the historical Jack Ketch). Ketch makes a brief appearance in issue #10 of Bill Willingham's comic book series Fables and in the first book of Ben Aaronovitch Rivers of London series.

He is mentioned briefly in the 1951 movie of A Christmas Carol with Alistair Sim, when Mr. Jorkin warns the directors of the Amalgamated Mercantile Society to watch out for Scrooge and Marley, as "They'd skin Jack Ketch alive and he'd never know they'd done it." This scene does not appear in the Dickens source novel.

The long-running radio program Suspense aired an episode titled "Jack Ketch" starring British actor Charles Laughton on 22 September 1952.

== Notes ==
Footnotes

Citations

Preceded by Edward Dun	British office of hangman 1663–1686	Succeeded by Paskah Rose
