= John Cassell =

British publisher, namesake of "gasoline" (1817–1865)

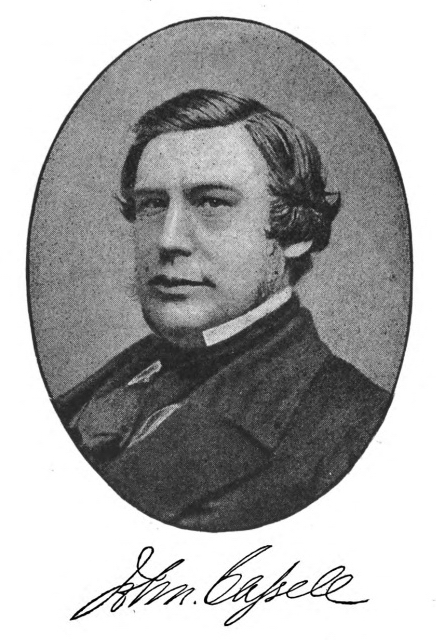
John Cassell

John Cassell (23 January 1817 – 2 April 1865) was an English publisher, printer, writer and editor, who founded the firm Cassell & Co, famous for its educational books and periodicals, and which pioneered the serial publication of novels. He was also a well-known tea and coffee merchant and a general business entrepreneur who, according to research published in 2012, sold an oil product for which he coined the term Cazeline which mutated into the word gasoline. A fervent Christian, he campaigned throughout his life for the temperance movement in Britain, and for the reduction of taxes on publishing. He was a social reformer who recognised the importance of education in improving the life of the working class, and whose many publications, both magazines and books, brought learning and culture to the masses.

== Life and work ==
=== Early years ===
John Cassell was born on 23 January 1817 in Manchester, then in Lancashire; the son of Mark Cassell, landlord of a public house called "The Ring O' Bells" at 8 The Old Churchyard, Hunt's Bank, Manchester. The family enjoyed a reasonable standard of living for the first 10 years until his father was disabled by a fall, dying 3 years later. The burden of providing for the family fell on his mother who made a living through upholstery work, though this left her with little time for her son. John received little education as a result and, from an early age, was required to work as a factory hand, manufacturing "tape" and velveteen. Cassell detested the work, which was both confining and monotonous, and felt oppressed by the appalling social conditions around him. Seeking better prospects, he impressed a local carpenter with his woodworking skills and was offered an apprenticeship.

=== Temperance movement ===
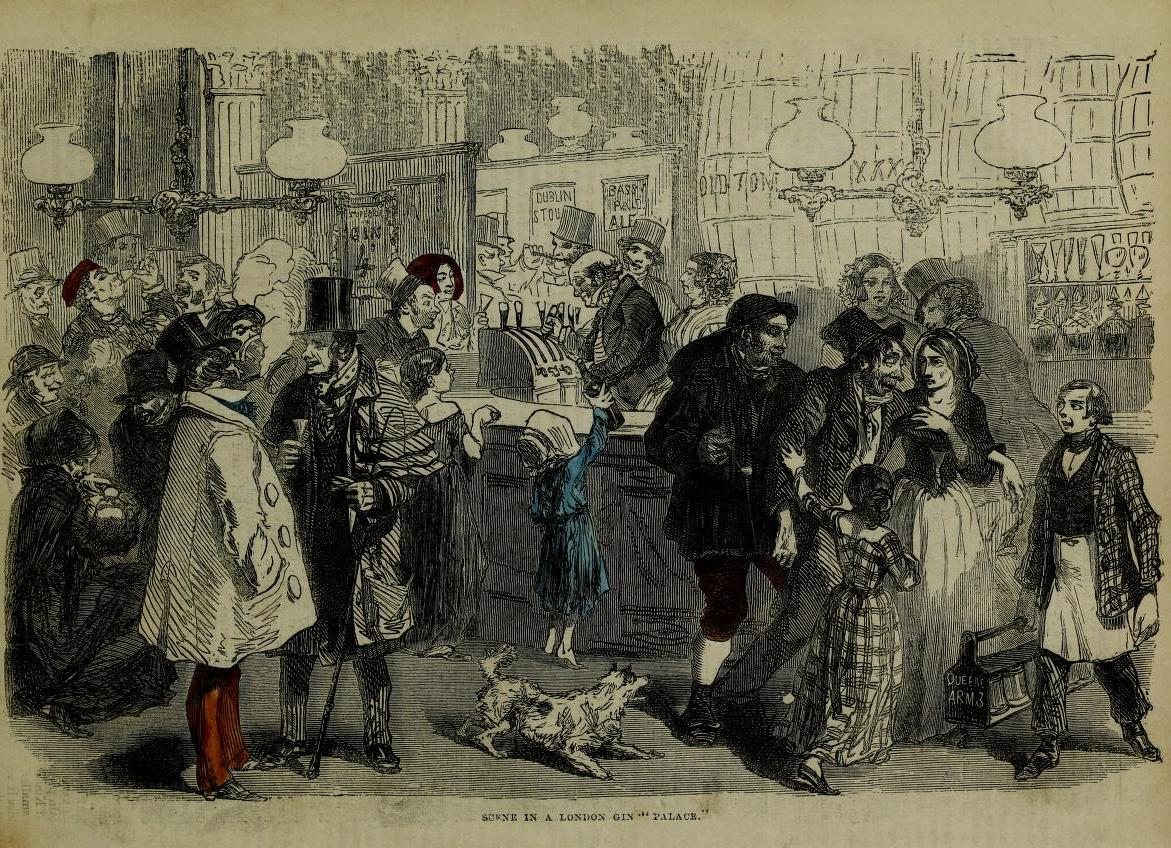
Scene in a London Gin Palace (engraving from the "Working Man's friend and family instructor", 25 Oct 1851)

In 1833, Cassell came under the influence of the temperance movement, and "signed the pledge" at a local meeting held by a Mr. Thomas Swindlehurst; he also witnessed the well-known temperance campaigner Joseph Livesey speak at the Oak Street Chapel in Manchester. At the time, alcoholism was a pressing social issue; tea and coffee were prohibitively expensive for the working classes, milk was seen as a luxury, and beer, by contrast, was relatively cheap and readily available. Cassell strongly identified with the ideals of the movement and, having first honoured his indentures of apprenticeship, decided to become a travelling temperance lecturer. Making good his lack of formal education, he had also sought self-improvement by teaching himself general knowledge, English literature and some French language.

In 1836, having spent several months lecturing on teetotalism in the Manchester area, Cassell set off by foot for London, stopping on the way to speak about temperance to any audience that he could find, and supporting himself by doing carpentry odd-jobs. In October 1836, after 16 days of walking, he finally arrived in London with the princely sum of 3 pence in his pocket, unable even to afford lodgings for the night. That same evening, he spoke at a temperance meeting at the New Jerusalem Schoolroom near Westminster Bridge Road, and for the next 6 months was involved in temperance campaigning in the capital.

In April 1837, Cassell was enrolled as a recognised agent of the "National Temperance Society", and toured around England and Wales, lecturing and taking total abstinence "pledges". In 1841, while on a temperance tour of the eastern counties, he met a Lincolnshire woman, Mary Abbott, whom he married the same year. Mary inherited a sum of money from her father which enabled the couple to settle in St. John's Wood, London, and gave John the capital he needed to invest in a business. Their home became a meeting place for writers, artists and reformers - people such as George Cruikshank, William and Mary Howitt, and Ellen Wood.

=== Publisher ===
==== Tea, coffee and temperance tracts ====
In 1843, Cassell set himself up as a tea and coffee merchant in Coleman Street, City of London. The business was an immediate success, moving eventually to larger premises in 80 Fenchurch Street. His teas and coffees were extensively advertised in the press, and slogans such as "Buy Cassell's shilling coffee" made them quite a household word. He bought a second-hand printing press to produce advertising leaflets for his wares and this led him to writing and publishing his own temperance tracts.

==== Temperance periodicals and the "Working Man's Friend" ====
Cassell went into partnership with his brother-in-law, and this allowed him to concentrate on editing and writing periodicals, the first of which, The Teetotal Times, appeared in 1846, becoming, in 1849, The Teetotal Times and Essayist a monthly, which continued for a few years afterwards. In July 1848, he started publication of Standard of Freedom, a weekly newspaper aimed at the popular market, whose principles were free-trade and freedom of religion. It only lasted until 1851, becoming incorporated into the Weekly News and Chronicle.

In 1850, he started the Working Man's Friend, a weekly magazine aiming to educate its readers without patronising them or playing to the lowest common denominator, and sympathetic to the life of working-class people. Its readers sent in hundreds of letters and articles for publication, and the magazine drew praise from figures such as Richard Cobden, politician and social reformer, and the Earl of Carlisle. In 1851, in order to expand the business, Cassell purchased William Cathrell's printing plant in The Strand, London, bringing the printing of the Working Man's Friend in-house.

==== Business expansion ====
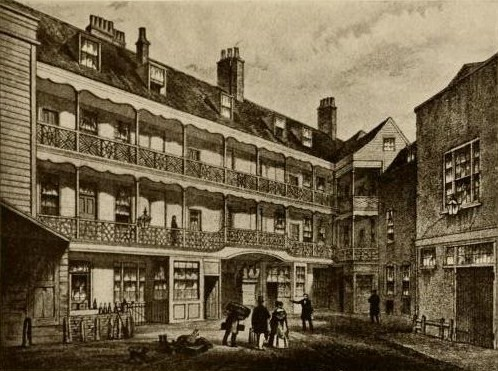
Bell Savage Inn

In 1851, The Illustrated Exhibitor, a monthly periodical about The Great Exhibition, started publication, to great success, achieving sales of 100,000 by December. The expansion of the company meant a move to bigger premises at "La Belle Sauvage Yard", previously the site of a centuries-old inn, on the north side of Ludgate Hill, in 1852.

Around this time the Cassell's Library series started to appear; 26 volumes were eventually published including books on history, biography and science. In April 1852, the weekly Popular Educator started publication, achieving both popular success and critical acclaim - "a school, a library and a university" was how one commentator described it. The magazine inspired readers to continue their education in local classes, with Cassell offering practical and financial help where needed. It became something an institution, helping to improve the education, prospects and employment opportunities of the nation; even Lloyd George, future Prime Minister of Britain, credited the Popular Educator with bolstering his meagre childhood education and helping him to better himself. This was followed in 1852 with the Popular Biblical Educator, which hoped to do for religion what its predecessor had done for general knowledge.

In 1853, the Illustrated Family Paper started publication, aiming to provide literary recreation for a family audience. It included not just educational articles but serialisations of novels as well. One of these, The Warp and the Weft, a tale about Lancashire mill workers by John Frederick Smith, appeared during the Lancashire Cotton Famine, and inspired readers of the paper to contribute a large sum to a relief fund for cotton workers. At the time of the Crimean War he procured from Paris the woodcuts used in L'Illustration, and by printing them secured a large circulation for the Paper. In 1867, after Cassell's death, the magazine was reduced in size and changed its name to Cassell's Magazine.

==== Partnership with Petter & Galpin ====
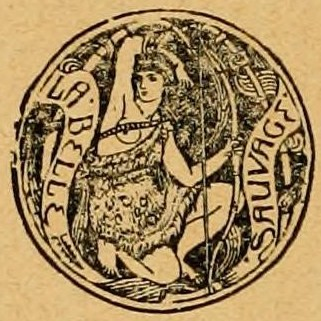
The emblem "La Belle Sauvage" (from an 1896 book)

By the end of 1854, an unexpected call to repay credit advanced by his paper supplier forced Cassell to sell the copyright and stock for the Illustrated Family Paper, Popular Educator and other completed publications. This was only meant to be a temporary measure until the business found its feet again. Hence he found himself in semi-partnership with the printing firm "Petter & Galpin". During this interim period The Illustrated Family Bible a periodical in penny parts appeared and achieved popularity abroad as well as at home. In 1865 came the Illustrated History of England, in weekly and monthly parts, totalling 8 volumes and with around 2000 illustrations; more than a quarter of a million copies were sold of the first edition.

Other periodicals included The Illustrated Magazine of Art (1853–54, later revived as The Magazine of Art to greater success some years after Cassell's death), The Freeholder (monthly magazine of the "free land" movement), and the religious magazines The Pathwayand The Quiver (first edition 7 September 1861). Cassell also conceived the idea of daily paper but this did not come to fruition until three years after his death; The Echo, as it was called, lasted only a few years from 1868 to 1875, when it was sold off, continuing, under various management, until 1905.

Cassell visited the United States in 1853 to attend the World Temperance Convention in New York, and again in 1854 and 1859 on publishing business. He met the author Harriet Beecher Stowe and arranged for the publication of an illustrated edition of Uncle Tom's Cabin in Britain - to great success. Cassell strongly supported the cause of the slavery abolitionists.

In 1859, on his return from the US, he went into full partnership with Petter & Galpin, the company becoming Cassell, Petter & Galpin. The company was particularly successful in its production of illustrated editions of classic literature such as Robinson Crusoe, Gulliver's travels, The Vicar of Wakefield and others. The great French artist Gustave Doré provided illustrations for Dante's Inferno (1861), Don Quixote, and a special edition of the Holy Bible. The company's premises at La Belle Sauvage yard also gained the distinction of a visit from the French Emperor Napoleon III himself, as it was publishing the English edition of his book, The History of Julius Caesar.

Cassell played an important part in lobbying government to reduce the burden of taxation on paper and periodical publications - the "tax on knowledge" as it was called - and his endeavours in the 1850s helped to repeal Newspaper Advertisement Duty, Newspaper Stamp Duty and Paper Duty (the latter in 1861).

=== Final years ===
In his final years Cassell, seeing the business opportunities being opened up by the development of artificial light, set up an oil distillation works at Hanwell. Despite his efforts the venture came to nothing and, though no serious financial loss was sustained, the project was a great drain on his time and energy.

Cassell died, aged only 48, of an internal tumour, on 2 April 1865 at his home at 25 Avenue Road, Regent's Park, London; the same day as his friend Richard Cobden. He was buried at Kensal Green Cemetery. He was survived by his widow Mary, who died in Brighton on 6 July 1885. He also left a daughter, Sophia (d. 1912). The company, Cassell, Petter & Galpin, which at the time of his death, employed 500 people, continued under the management of the remaining partners, Petter and Galpin.

== See also ==
- Cassell's Magazine
- Cassell's National Library

== Bibliography ==
- The working man's friend, and family instructor (London: John Cassell):

Volumes 1.1 – 3.39 (5 Jan 1850 – 28 Sep 1850.)
Volumes 4.40 – 5.65 (5 Oct 1850 – 29 Mar 1851)
Volumes 6.46 – 7.91 (5 Apr 1851 – 27 Sep 1851)
Volumes 1.1 – 2.52 (4 Oct 1851 – 25 Sep 1852). Illustrated.

- The popular educator - a complete encyclopedia (new and revised edition) (London: Cassell, Petter & Galpin):

Volume 1, Volume 2, Volume 3, Volume 4, Volume 5, Volume 6

- Curwen, Henry. A history of booksellers, the old and the new (London: Chatto and Windus, 1873) pp. 267–274.
- Stephen, Leslie, ed. (1887). "Cassell, John" . Dictionary of National Biography. Vol. 9. London: Smith, Elder & Co. p. 268–9.
- Cassell and Company. The story of the House of Cassell (1922)
- Nowell-Smith, Simon. The House of Cassell 1848-1958 (Cassell, 1958).
- Feather, John. A history of British publishing (Routledge, 1988).
- Brake, Laurel & Demoor, Marysa. Dictionary of nineteenth-century journalism in Great Britain and Ireland (Academia Press, 2009) pp. 100–101.
