= Ludgate (surname) =

Ludgate is a surname. Notable people with the surname include:

- Percy Ludgate (1883–1922), Irish designer of an early Analytical Engine
- Simon de Ludgate (died 1302), English-born judge in Ireland
- William Ludgate (1836–1912), United States Army soldier
- April Ludgate, character on the American television series Parks and Recreation, played by Aubrey Plaza
