= John Austin (highwayman) =

English criminal (died 1783)

- Died: 7 November 1783; Tyburn, Middlesex
- Occupation: footpad
- Status: Executed by hanging
- Convictions: Attempted murder Highway robbery
- Penalty: Death

John Austin (died 7 November 1783) was an English footpad who became the last person to be hanged at the Tyburn gallows just outside London. He was sentenced to death for the attempted murder of a labourer called John Spicer from Kent during a robbery. The Recorder of London, James Adair, described it as a "robbery with violence" that involved "cutting and wounding [...] in a cruel manner." This hanging would mark the end of Tyburn, a village in Middlesex, being a place of executions for almost 600 years.

Austin was brought from Newgate prison in the City of London by cart to the gallows. The 2 1/2 mile journey along Tyburn Road would have taken up to three hours. Standing shackled in the cart, he would have been accompanied by two guards and a chaplain. They would traditionally stop on the way at St Sepulchre-without-Newgate and two public houses where drinks would be served.

On arrival at Tyburn, Austin's cart would have been positioned under a beam and a noose attached around his head. He would then be permitted to address the crowd, his last words were:

"Good people, I request your prayers for the salvation of my departing soul. Let my example teach you to shun the bad ways I have followed. Keep good company, and mind the word of God. Lord have mercy on me. Jesus look down with pity on me. Christ have mercy on my poor soul!"

However, for Austin the noose slipped up the back of his neck, and as the cart was taken from under him the slackness in the rope prevented rapid asphyxiation. It was said it took 10 minutes for him to choke to death. After Austin was hanged, his body was cut down and sent for formal dissection by The Company of Surgeons at the Surgeon's Hall in the Old Bailey.

The gallows were dismantled after the execution. Future public hangings were now conducted on a scaffold named the "new drop" outside the Newgate.
