= Edward Dun =

English executioner

Edward Dun (died 11 September 1663), also referred to as Squire Dun, was an English executioner who served as London's 'common hangman' from 1649 to 1663. He assumed the post shortly following the death in June 1649 of Richard Brandon, the headsman believed to have executed Charles I.

Dun was also the general name for hangman, before that of Jack-ketch.

And presently a halter got,

Made of the best strong hempen tear,

And e'er a cat could lick her ear,

Had tied it up with as much art,

As Dun himfelf could do for's heart.

COTTON'S VIRGIL TRA. Book iv.

It is possible that he performed the posthumous executions of Oliver Cromwell, Henry Ireton and John Bradshaw in 1661, his role in which is described in The last farewel of three bould traytors by Abraham Miles. He died on 11 September 1663. He was succeeded as 'common hangman' by the better-known Jack Ketch, who had been his apprentice.

Preceded by Richard Brandon	Common Hangman of London; 1649–1663	Succeeded by Jack Ketch
