= The Working Man's Friend and Family Instructor =

The Working Man's Friend and Family Instructor (short title used The Working Man's Friend) (Note: Not to be confused with other titles of the nineteenth century using similar titles: Ward, J. T. (John Towers); Gash, Norman (2002), W. B. Ferrand : 'the working man's friend', 1809-1889, Tuckwell Press, ISBN 978-1-898410-70-6 WB Ferrand 1809-1889; 1836 Cincinnati, Ohio publication - The Working man's friend, [s.n.], 1836; Cleave, John (1832), The Working man's friend, and political magazine, H. Willis, 1832, John Cleave publication) was a mid-nineteenth century publication that was published by John Cassell in London.

It was produced in the months preceding the Great Exhibition and contained repeated references to the preparations and contributions.

Supplementary monthly editions were also published.

It had ceased publication by 1852.

Microforms and online forms of the publication have been made.
