= Ludgate Hill =

Street and area in the City of London

Coordinates: 51.5137°N 0.101°W

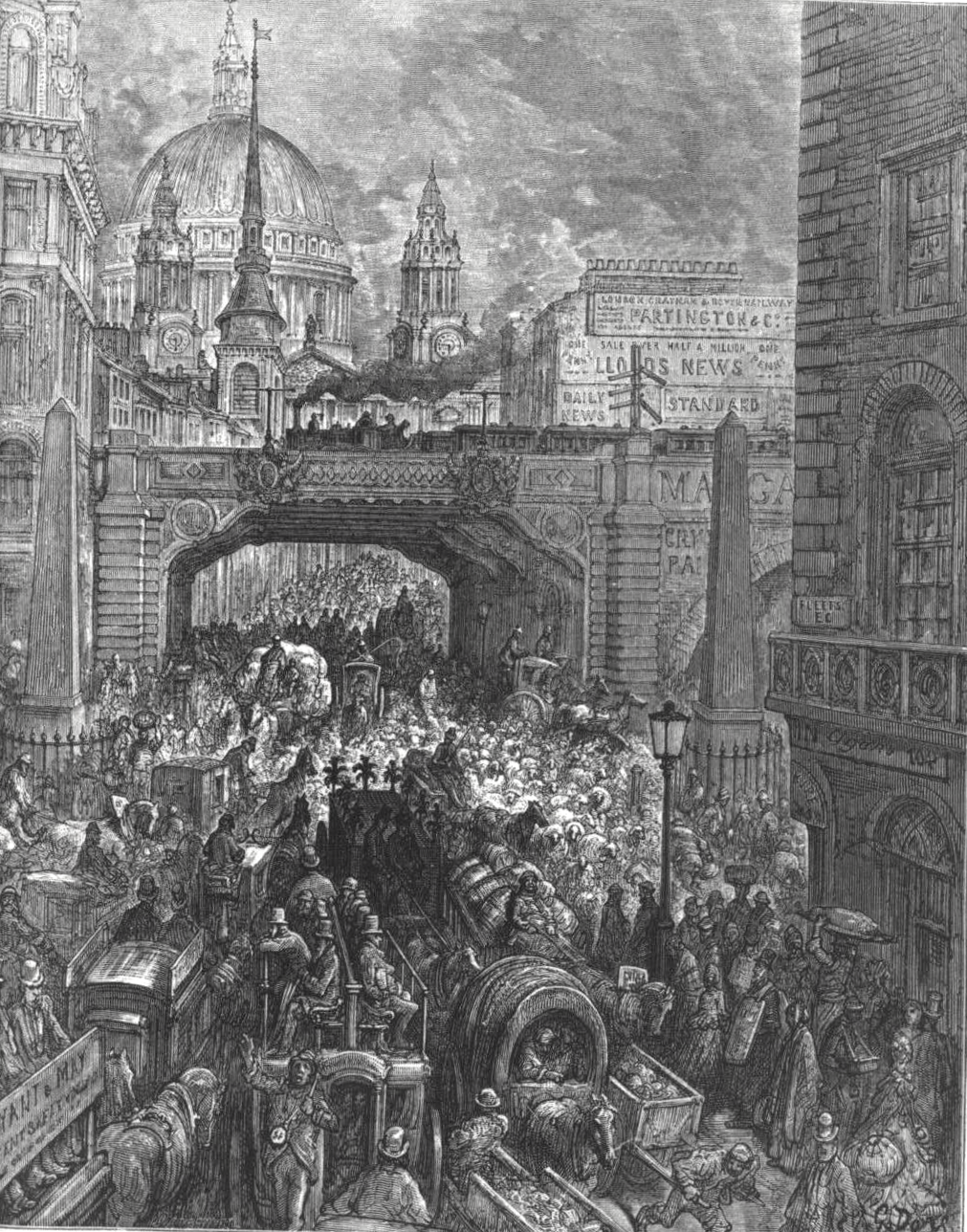
Ludgate Hill – A block in the street, by Gustave Doré (1872)

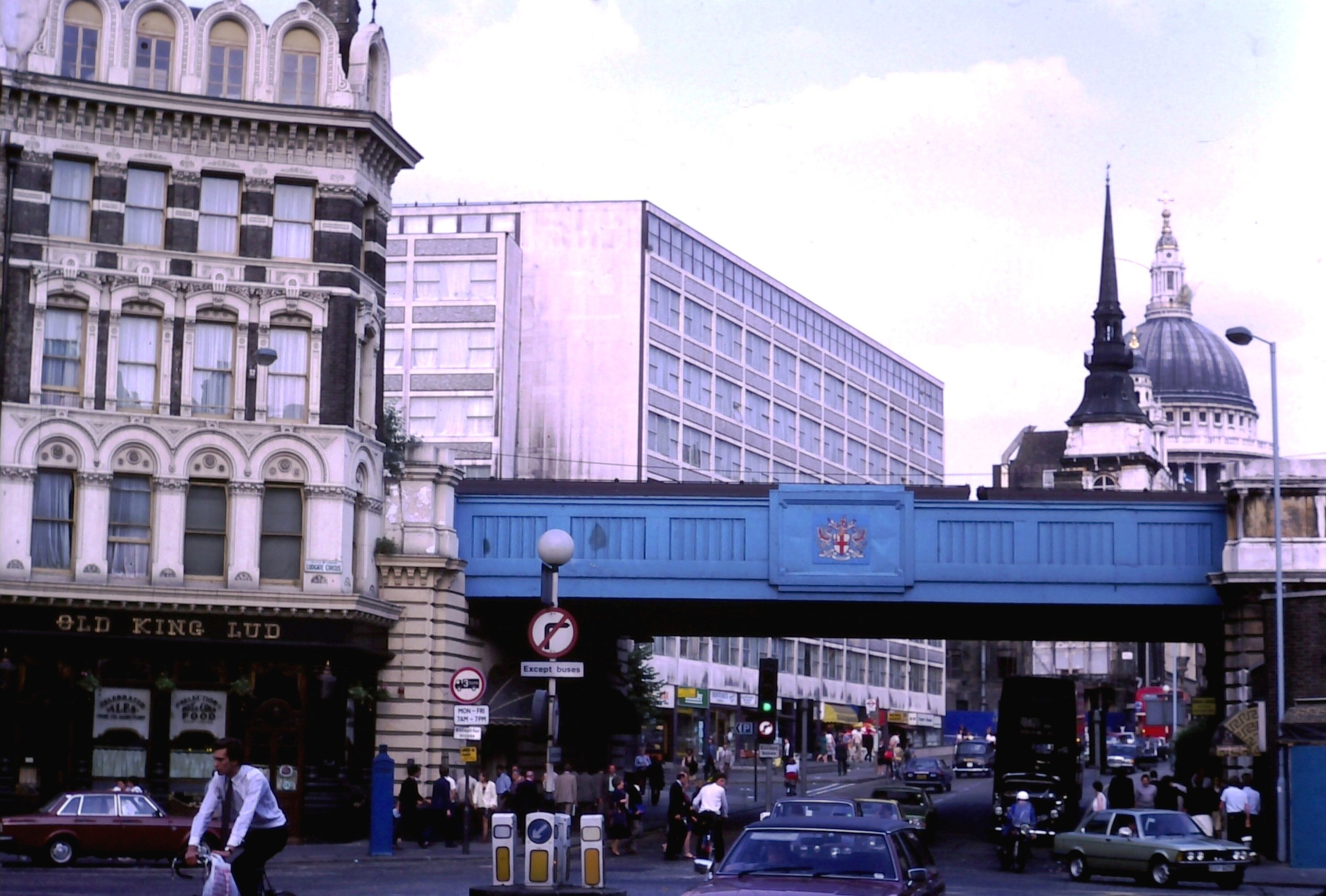
Ludgate Hill looking east from the foot of Fleet Street, 1970

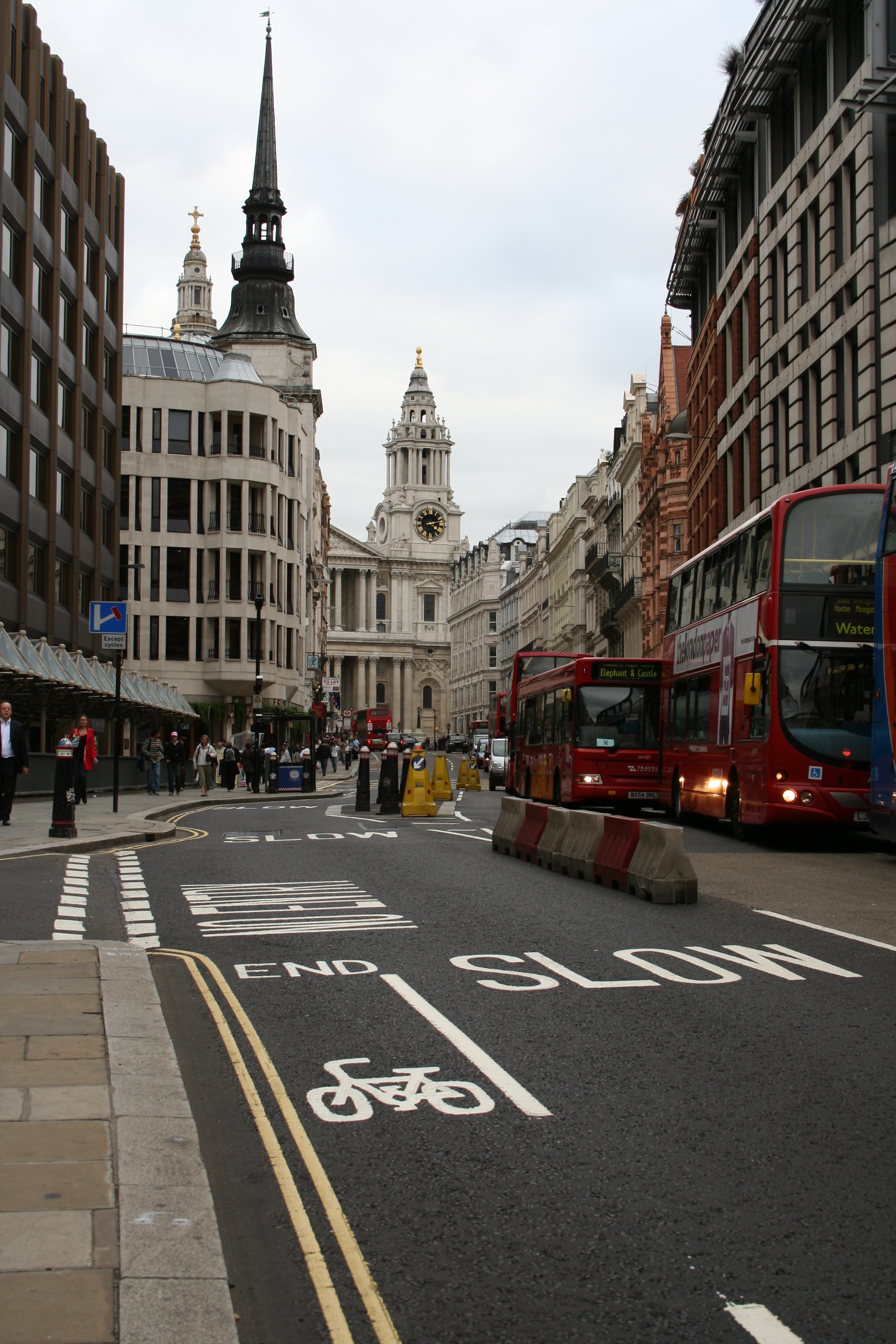
Ludgate Hill in 2006

Ludgate Hill is a street and surrounding area, on a small hill in the City of London, England. The street passes through the former site of Ludgate, a city gate that was demolished – along with a gaol attached to it – in 1760.

The area includes St Paul's Cathedral. The modern cathedral, it has been claimed, was built on a site that – during the Roman British era of the early first millennium – was occupied by a major Roman temple, dedicated to the goddess Diana.

Ludgate Hill itself is traditionally regarded as one of a trio of hills in Central London, the others being Tower Hill and Cornhill. The highest point in the City is just north of St Paul's, at 17.6 metres (58 ft) above sea level.

The modern street named Ludgate Hill, which was previously a much narrower thoroughfare named Ludgate Street, runs between St Paul's Churchyard and Ludgate Circus (built in 1864), at which point it becomes Fleet Street.

== Etymology ==
Ludgate is generally accepted to derive from the Old English term "hlid-geat" from "hlid" ("lid, cover, opening, gate") and "geat" or "gæt" ("gate, opening, passage") and was a common Old English compound meaning "postern" or "swing gate" and survives in various place names across England as well as in surnames.

Ludgate is mentioned in Geoffrey of Monmouth's Historia Regum Britanniae, written around 1136. According to the pseudohistorical work the name comes from the mythic Welsh King Lud whom he claims also gave his name to London. The Cronycullys of Englonde tell us of an early king of Britain: "he lete make a fayre gate and called hit Lud Gate after his name" in the year 66 BC, but it is more likely that the Romans were the first to build it, and that it is simply named after him. One proposed derivation, entirely prosaic, is that the name is a variation on "Fleodgaet", or "Fleet-gate".

== Description ==
Many small alleys on Ludgate Hill were swept away in the mid 1860s to build Ludgate Hill railway station between Water Lane and New Bridge Street, a station of the London, Chatham and Dover Railway. It was closed to passengers in 1929 and the railway bridge and viaduct between Holborn Viaduct and Blackfriars stations was demolished in 1990 to enable the construction of the City Thameslink railway station in a tunnel. This also involved the regrading of the slope of Ludgate Hill at the junction.

There is a blue plaque near the bottom of the hill with these words: "In a house near this site was published in 1702 The Daily Courant first London daily newspaper".

About halfway up Ludgate Hill is the church of St Martin, Ludgate, once physically joined to the Ludgate.

Paternoster Square, home of the London Stock Exchange since 2004, is on the hill, immediately to the north of St Paul's Cathedral.

== Literary associations ==
At the bottom of Ludgate Hill, on the north side, is Limeburner Lane. This may sound like a quaint survival from medieval times, but it was actually constructed in the 1990s, where Seacoal Lane used to be. This was the location of the Bell Savage Inn, first mentioned in 1452 where plays were performed. According to surveyor John Stow the name was derived from Isabella Savage, but Addison claimed it was "La belle Sauvage", a woman in the wilderness. The clown Richard Tarlton used to perform here. It is mentioned in Thomas Hughes' Tom Brown's Schooldays and Charles Dickens' The Pickwick Papers. In October 1684, a "Rynoceros lately brought from the East Indies" was put on show there. The inn was demolished in 1873. In 1851, part of it was rented out to John Cassell (1817–1865), a notable publisher. At this time it was still called La Belle Sauvage Yard and the firm of Cassell used "la Belle Sauvage" in some of their imprints.

The prison is mentioned in Daniel Defoe's Roxana: The Fortunate Mistress.

From 1731, the "London Coffee House" was next to St Martin's, Ludgate, at 24–26 Ludgate Hill. It was frequented by Joseph Priestley and Benjamin Franklin. When the juries at the Old Bailey failed to reach a verdict, they were housed here overnight. In 1806, a Roman hexagonal altar dedicated to Claudia Martina by her husband, now in the Guildhall, was found here together with a statue of Hercules. The London Coffee House was closed in 1867, and is now occupied by a pub called "Ye Olde London".

Edmund Spenser's The Shepheardes Calender was printed by Hugh Singleton at the sign of the "Gylden tunne" in Creed Lane in 1579. John Evelyn lived in the Hawk and Pheasant on Ludgate Hill in 1658–59.

The Blackfriars, or Dominicans, first came to London in 1221. In 1278, they moved from Holborn to an area south of Ludgate, where they built a friary. By 1320, they had demolished the Roman wall to build a new wall for the friary. This was demolished at the Reformation, but the name persisted – in 1596 James Burbage, the manager of Shakespeare's acting company, The Lord Chamberlain's Men, acquired the lease to a part of the property that was already being used as a theatre. His intention appears to have been to have the Lord Chamberlain's Men act here. However, local opposition meant that the more fashionable children's acting companies who were already performing here continued to act here for some years instead. It wasn't until 1609 that Shakespeare's company of actors (by then called The King's Men) was able to act at the Blackfriars Theatre. In 1613, Shakespeare bought the Blackfriars gate-house.

Pageantmaster Court is almost opposite St. Martin's. The name is not medieval but dates from 1993. However, to the west is King's Arms Court, which existed until recently. Grinling Gibbons lived there. According to Stow, the gate acquired statues in 1260. In the reign of Edward VI the heads were "smitten off" and a few years later "Queen Mary did set new heads upon their old bodies again".

William Hone, journalist and publisher, had an office near Ludgate Hill and the Old Bailey during the mid-1800s. Scottish publisher Alexander Strahan who published Good Words in the 1860s had an office at 56 Ludgate Hill.

== Notable residents ==
- Samuel Birch (military officer)
- William Harvey (1578–1657) – discovered the circulation of the blood, 1628. From 1604 to 1639 Harvey held a residence in the precincts of St Martin's Church, Ludgate.
