= Miles Prance =

English Roman Catholic craftsman

Miles Prance (fl. 1678) was an English Roman Catholic craftsman who was caught up in and perjured himself during the Popish Plot and the resulting anti-Catholic hysteria in London during the reign of Charles II.

== Life ==
Prance was born on the Isle of Ely, the son of a Roman Catholic, and he rose quickly from his humble origins as an apprentice goldsmith to servant-in-ordinary to Catherine of Braganza, Charles II's queen. He was married with a family, living in Covent Garden at the time of his arrest.

== Popish Plot ==
Sir Edmund Berry Godfrey died in October 1678; he disappeared from his home and was found dead at Primrose Hill, having apparently been strangled and run through with a sword some days before his death. Godfrey, though normally tolerant in matters of religion, had been militating against the Jesuits around the time of the Popish Plot, the great wave of anti-Catholic hysteria which swept across England in 1678 due to the lies of Titus Oates about a Catholic conspiracy to assassinate the Royal Family. Godfrey's death brought the hysteria to boiling point: the next few weeks were long remembered as "Godfrey's Autumn". Prance was known to be a Roman Catholic and suspicion fell upon him for Godfrey's death, even though it was thought by many of those who knew him best to be suicide.

=== Arrest and interrogation ===
Prance unwisely drew attention to himself by attending one of the Popish Plot trials, and then publicly defending the accused as "very honest men". William Bedloe, a notorious confidence trickster and later a Popish Plot accuser, investigated Prance's movements during the relevant period and interrogated one John Wren, Prance's Protestant lodger, who owed him rent. Wren stated that Prance had been out of the house on the night of the murder (this was later found to be untrue, although another Protestant lodger in Prance's house, Joseph Hale, told the same story). Bedloe, with the assistance of Wren and Hale, evidently decided to enhance his public standing as a "discoverer" of the Plot by denouncing Prance, who as a Catholic of rather humble social background, without influential friends to protect him, was particularly vulnerable to such an accusation.

Prance was arrested and sent to Newgate Prison. He was confined to the notoriously uncomfortable "Little Ease" cell (not to be confused with the better known "Little Ease" in the Tower of London) where he was put in chains. He was denied a fire, despite the bitter winter weather, and nearly froze to death as a result. So anxious was the Government for him to confess that he was even threatened with the rack, the use of which had been illegal for fifty years.

In prison, Prance confessed and then recanted. He then confessed to a different version of the crime and recanted that. Finally, after being visited by three leading clergymen, William Boys, Gilbert Burnet, and William Lloyd, who prayed with him and urged him to confess his part in the crime, he settled on the story to which he stuck throughout the Plot trials. He said that two Irish priests, "Fitzgerald" and "Kelly", told him of a plot to kill Godfrey, and that two workmen, Henry Berry and Robert Green, together with the Queen's chaplain Thomas Godden and Godden's servant, Lawrence Hill, followed and strangled Godfrey while Prance kept watch. They then hid Godfrey's body in nearby Somerset House (this detail seems to have been an attempt to implicate the Queen, whose private residence it was, in the murder). They waited before placing it in a ditch and running it through with Godfrey's own sword, to discredit the theory of death by suicide (Godfrey suffered from depression and after the Popish Plot hysteria died down some of his friends and relatives admitted that they suspected that his death was suicide).

Prance later admitted that all of this was pure invention: it is not even clear if the priest called Father Kelly existed, though Father Fitzgerald did. Prance could produce no credible motive for the murder, merely saying vaguely that Godfrey had offended the two Irish priests in some way. He never explained why he had accused Berry, Green and Hill, who were unquestionably innocent, nor why they should wish Godfrey dead, apart from the vague reference to a quarrel between Godfrey and the Irish priests, in which Hill's employer Father Godden sided with his fellow priests. Kenyon argues that the lack of a plausible motive is the central flaw with all theories about Godfrey's murder; none of the named suspects, on careful analysis, had a sufficient reason to kill him. Only the deranged Philip Herbert, 7th Earl of Pembroke, who was apparently not suspected at the time, now seems to have had a strong enough motive for the murder, since he had a bitter personal grievance against Godfrey.

=== Perjury ===
Berry, Green, and Hill were arrested, and Fr. Godden fled the country. Fr. Fitzgerald, whom the others admitted to knowing, was apparently left in peace, probably because he was a member of the household of the envoy from Venice and could thus claim diplomatic immunity, while Fr. Kelly, if he existed at all, simply disappeared. Prance perjured himself at the trial, but came across as a convincing witness and made a good impression on the jury: Mrs. Hill bravely protested in open court that "Prance knows all these things to be as false as God is true" and she rightly predicted that "the truth shall be declared after, when it is too late". Sir William Scroggs, the Lord Chief Justice, replied that he could not believe that Prance would swear three men to their deaths for nothing, even though he presumably knew that threats of torture had been used to make Prance confess. All three men were executed. Prance then split the reward for finding the killers with Bedloe. Bedloe and Titus Oates used Prance to inform on several Roman Catholics during the Popish Plot. He offered evidence against Thomas Whitbread (alias Harcourt) and John Fenwick, two of the leading Jesuit priests, in June 1679 and received a £50 pension from the King in January 1680. He also helped Oates attack Roger L'Estrange and wrote pamphlets defending himself against charges of multiple contradictions. After the breaking of the Plot, he assumed a lower public profile. The fact that he had been ill-treated and possibly tortured to make him confess became widely known (Elizabeth Cellier published a pamphlet on the case, and was prosecuted for seditious libel as a result) and caused his credit to sink further.

== Recantation ==
However, when James II came to the throne, Prance was tried for his part in the Plot. He was found guilty of perjury in 1686 and was fined £100, ordered to stand in the pillory, and to be whipped. Queen Catherine interceded on his behalf to prevent the last of these punishments, arguing that he had returned to the Roman Catholic faith and was truly repentant. He said that only fear for his life had compelled him to lie and inform and that his mistreatment in prison had coerced his testimony. As Mrs Hill had correctly predicted, he admitted that her husband was wholly innocent, as well as Godden, Green and Berry. In 1688, he tried to flee to France. He was captured, questioned before the House of Lords, and then permitted to leave England.

== Sources ==
- Marshall, Alan. "Miles Prance" in Matthew, H.C.G. and Brian Harrison, eds. The Oxford Dictionary of National Biography. vol. 45, pp. 208–9. London: OUP, 2004.
- Kenyon, J.P. The Popish Plot Phoenix Press Reissue 2000
