= A True Narrative of the Horrid Hellish Popish Plot =

Song

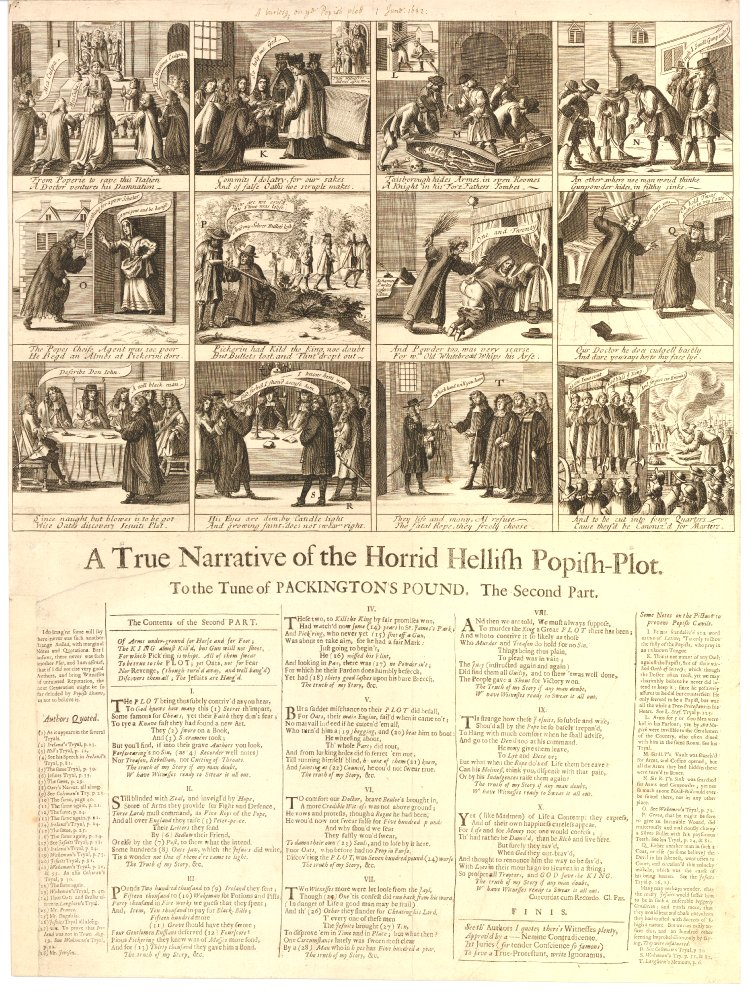
Second half of the lyrics with illustrations by Francis Barlow.

"A True Narrative of the Horrid Hellish Popish Plot" is a late seventeenth-century English broadside ballad telling the story of the contemporary anti-Catholic scare in England known as the Popish Plot.

A True Narrative of the Horrid Hellish Popish Plot is also the title of an early picture-story and prototypical comic strip with speech balloons, created by Francis Barlow in c. 1682 and based on the same historical event.

== Synopsis ==
The narrator of the ballad begins by placing himself firmly on the side of the anti-Catholics by declaring to tell

How the Jesuit, Devil, and POPE did agree,
Our STATE to destroy, and Religion so old.
To murder our KING,
A most Horrible Thing!

— Stanza I, lines 3-6

They then go on to tell the murder of the knight Sir Edmund Berry Godfrey, a member of Parliament and a staunch Protestant. The narrator describes as a fitting place for the murder a back-court of Somerset House, presumably because many people gather there, making it easier to disguise a murder. Godfrey's body is handled very roughly by his murderers:

His Body they toss'd,
From Pillar to Post,

— Stanza II, lines 5-6

When his body begins to decay, and in order to conceal the murder, the killers place his corpse on horseback to Soho and drive his own sword through his body, leaving his money and making sure his shoes are clean, to make it seem as if he has been killed by a thief. The murder of Godfrey is an attempt by participants in the plot to bring the vengeance of "th[e] excess of Jesuitical rage" upon London by stealing from and setting fire to its houses, which they have attempted to do many times before. The narrator may even be attributing blame for the Great Fire of London of 1666 to the plotters:

Y'have seen how they once set the Town all in flame;
And divers times since have attempted the same.

— Stanza IV, lines 8-9

The narrator then credits the fraudster and informer William Bedloe for knowledge of Jesuits conniving their way into Londoners' homes disguised as drivers of goods vehicles, porters, chimney-sweeps, or coal sellers and then sabotaging the homes. The narrator then tells how there was a meeting between the conspirators in April at a place called the White Horse.

== Library/archival holdings ==
The English Broadside Ballad Archive at the University of California, Santa Barbara holds three seventeenth-century broadside ballad versions of this tale: two copies in the Huntington Library's "miscellaneous" collection (both numbered 183923) and another in the Crawford collection at the National Library of Scotland. All three of these documents contain cartoon illustrations.

== Francis Barlow's comic ==
In 1682 Francis Barlow made a series of etchings about the Popish Plot, A True Narrative of the Horrid Hellish Popish Plot, picturing all the events in a chronological order with emphasis on Titus Oates and his eventual arrest. The work is an early example of a comic strip, where the characters use speech balloons and narration is told underneath each image. It combines a balloon comic with text comic format.
