= Thomas Godden =

English Roman Catholic priest

Thomas Godden, real name Tylden (1624 in Addington, Kent – 1 December 1688 in London) was an English courtier and Catholic priest, who was falsely implicated on charges of murder and treason in the Titus Oates or Popish Plot, but managed to flee the country. He was later completely vindicated.

== Life ==
His father, William Tylden, was able to provide a liberal education for his son and Thomas was sent first to a private school in Holborogh, conducted by a Mr. Gill, and in his fifteenth year entered Queen's College, Oxford. The next year found him at St John's College, Cambridge, and in 1640 he was made a Billingsley scholar. He received a B.A. in 1641, but the influence of John Sargeant, with whom he became acquainted during his college course, had induced him to enter the Catholic Church, and in 1642 the two set out for the English College, Lisbon.

In due course, Godden was ordained. In 1650 he was a philosophy lecturer. He rapidly ascended the ladder of academic distinction, and after being successively professor of theology, prefect of studies, and vice-president, succeeded Dr. Clayton as president of the college in 1655. Five years later he received the degree of Doctor of Divinity. Princess Catherine of Braganza, about to marry Charles II, brought Godden to England with her, as her private chaplain. He was well received in his native country and enjoyed every evidence of royal favour.

== Popish Plot ==
In the wake of the Popish Plot, Miles Prance, a silversmith with close connections to the Court, was arrested and imprisoned on suspicion of complicity. In prison, he was put in chains, denied a fire to the point of almost freezing to death, and threatened with torture. Upon being examined about the murder of Sir Edmund Berry Godfrey, Prance swore that Godden and his servant Lawrence Hill had been concerned in the crime, and that Godfrey's corpse had been concealed for a time in Godden's apartments. Prance could suggest no plausible motive for the crime, merely saying vaguely that Godden had taken the side of two Irish priests, Kelly and Fitzgerald, in a quarrel with Godfrey, and that the quarrel for no clear reason led to murder. Kelly, of whom nothing is known, may have been a figment of Prance's imagination, although Godden and Hill did know an Irish priest called Fitzgerald, who was employed in the household of the Venetian envoy.

Godden, concerned that he would not receive a fair trial due to popular anti-Catholic sentiment, fled to Paris. His lodgings in Somerset House were searched, although they were too small to conceal a body. Several witnesses, including Godden's niece Mary Tylden, swore at the trial that Hill was elsewhere at the time of the murder, and Hill's wife accused Prance of perjury, saying that "he knows all of this is as false as God is true" and predicting that he would recant when it was too late. Hill was, nevertheless, executed at Tyburn on 21 February 1679, alongside his supposed co-conspirators Henry Green and Robert Berry.

== Later years ==
Later evidence, showing that Godden was in no way connected with Godfrey's death, altered public feeling: in 1686, just as Mrs. Hill had prophesied at her husband's trial, Miles Prance admitted that his charges against Hill, Berry, Green, FitzGerald and Godden had been a pure fabrication. In the reign of James II, Godden returned to his former post as almoner to the Queen Dowager. From this time until his death he took a prominent part in the religious controversies in England, and in 1686, with Bonaventure Giffard, defended the doctrine of the Real Presence, before the king, against Dr. William Jane and Dr. Simon Patrick. He was buried under the royal chapel in Somerset House.

== Publications ==
- Catholicks no Idolaters; or a full refutation of Dr. Stillingfleet's Unjust Charge of Idolatry against the Church of Rome (London, 1671);
- A Just Discharge to Dr. Stillingfleet's Unjust Charge of Idolatry against the Church of Rome. With a discovery of the Vanity of his late Defence . . . By way of a dialogue between Eunomius, a Conformist and Catharinus, a non-Conformist (Paris, 1677);
- A Sermon of St. Peter, preached before the Queen Dowager . . . on 29 June 1686 (London, 1686);
- A Sermon on the Nativity of Our Lord, preached before the Queen Dowager . . . at Somerset House (London, 1686).
- He also left a manuscript treatise on the Oath of Supremacy.
