= Oranienburg concentration camp =

Concentration camp in Nazi Germany

Coordinates: 52.7493°N 13.2367°E

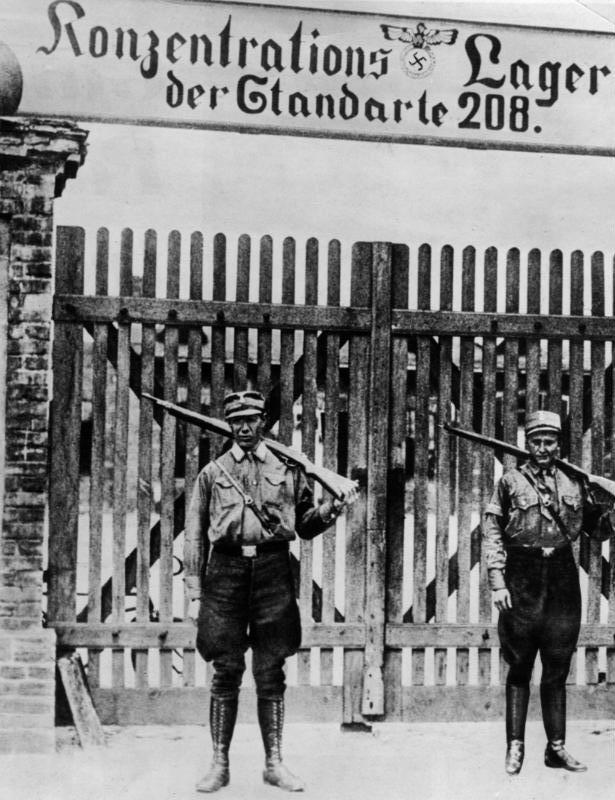
KZ Oranienburg, Nazi Germany, 1933

Oranienburg (German pronunciation: [oˈʁaːni̯ənˌbʊʁk], German: Konzentrationslager (KZ) Oranienburg) was an early Nazi concentration camp, one of the first detention facilities established by the Nazis in the state of Prussia when they gained power in 1933. It held the political opponents of the Nazi Party from the Berlin region, mostly members of the Communist Party and the Social Democratic Party and scores of undesirables.

It was established in the center of the town of Oranienburg on the main road to Berlin when the SA took over a disused brewery grounds. Passers-by were able to look inside the prison perimeter. Prisoners were marched through the town to perform forced labour on behalf of the local council.

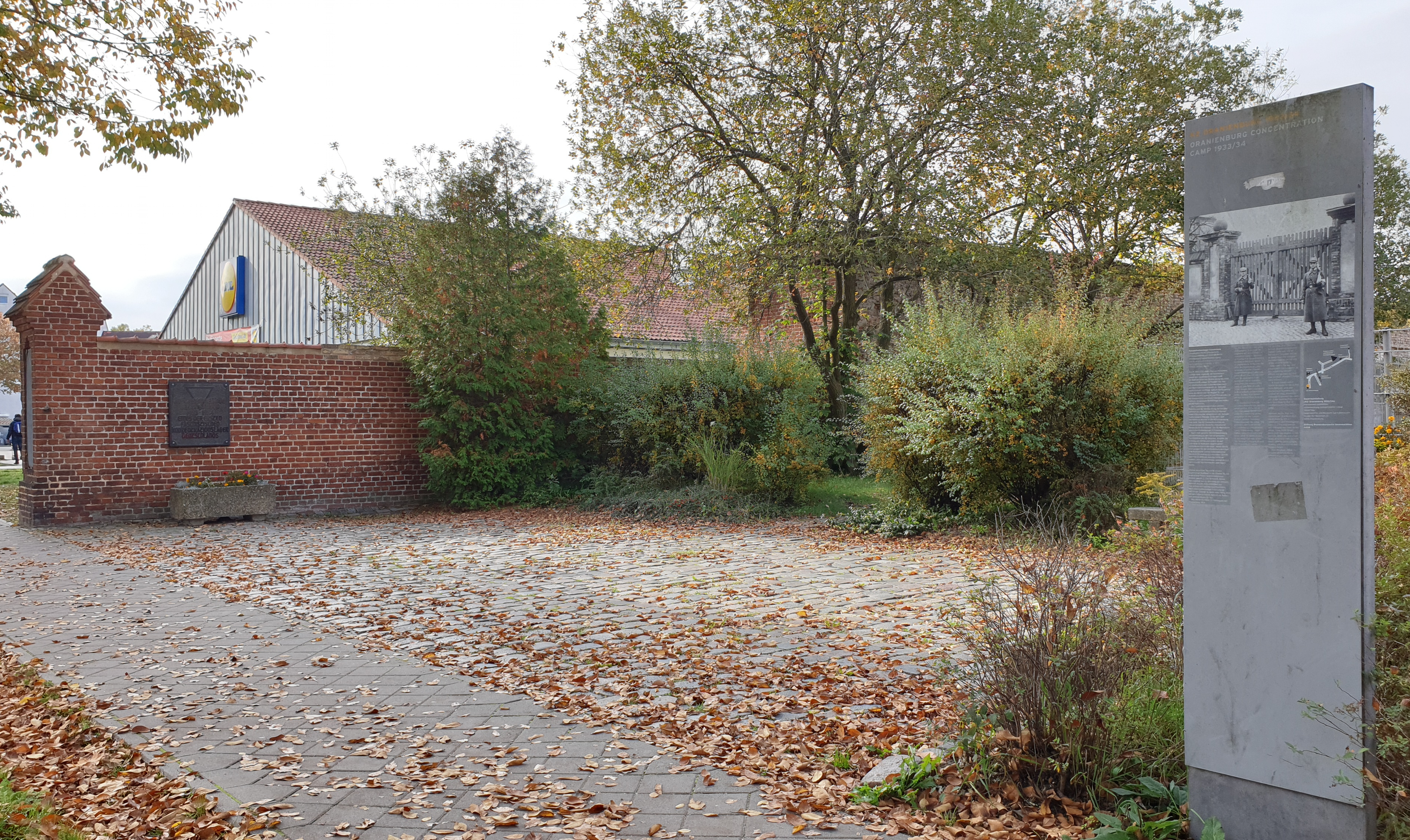
Oranienburg Concentration Camp Memorial on the site of the camp, Berliner Straße, Oranienburg. The brick wall is all that remains of the brewery.

The prison was taken over by the SS on 4 July 1934, when the SA was suppressed by the regime. It was closed and subsequently replaced in the area by Sachsenhausen concentration camp in 1936. At closure, the prison had held over 3,000 inmates, of whom 16 had died.

== See also ==
- List of Nazi-German concentration camps
- Standing cell used in Nazi concentration camps during the Third Reich
