= Standing cell =

Special cell constructed so as to prevent the prisoner from doing anything but stand

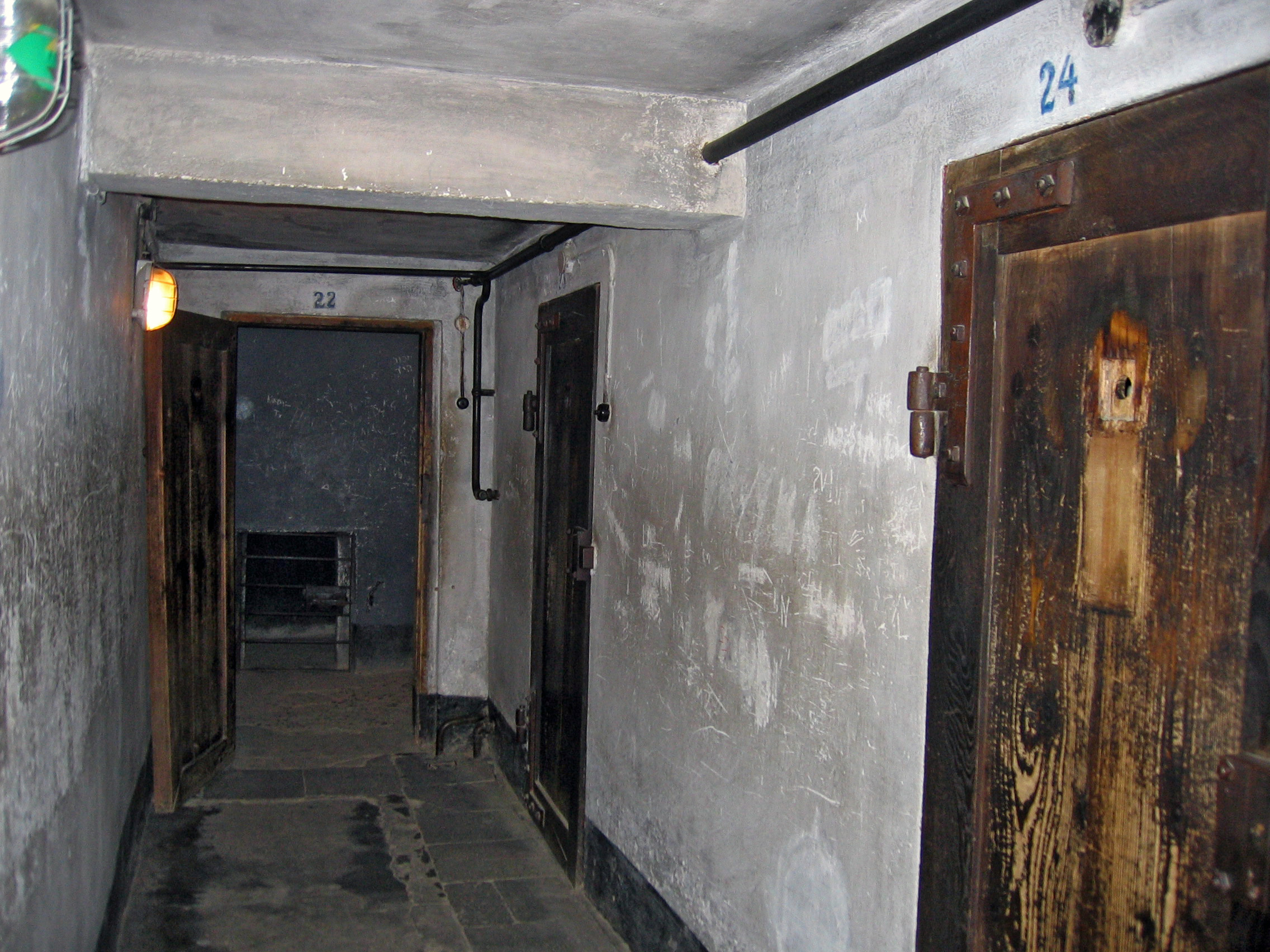
Cells at Auschwitz concentration camp's notorious Block 11. Hatch to a standing cell is seen at the end of the corridor

A standing cell is a special cell constructed so as to prevent the prisoner from doing anything but stand. Standing cells were used in 19th century Ottoman Empire, and in 20th century Chile, Germany, and Soviet Union. They were used in Nazi concentration camps during the Third Reich as a punishment. They were also used during Joseph Stalin's purges in the Soviet Union. Some standing cells were small enough for only one person, others held as many as four people.

== Ottoman Empire ==
The Armenian hosiery-manufacturer and musician Samuel Hovannes Zorian was arrested in 1895 by Ottoman authorities for being a political activist. He was beaten and incarcerated in a so-called "police room", measuring barely 0.2 square metres (2 sq ft) and with no windows. On the second day, he was dragged out and beaten almost senseless with sticks. Zorian was then sent back to the "police room" where he was confined for a further week and was only sustained on a diet of bread and water, with no medical attention given to him during that period.

== Nazi Germany ==
=== Oranienburg ===
SA camp commandant Werner Schäfer had two cells built in the basement of the Oranienburg concentration camp in 1933. The dimensions of the cell were such that a person could only stand. A prisoner named Neumann was held there for 192 hours (eight full days) and was allegedly driven mad as a result of his confinement. At times, prisoners were held in small coffin-sized closets in which they could only stand.

=== Dachau ===
The number of prisoners in Dachau concentration camp increased dramatically in the last years of the Second World War. The concentration camp was overcrowded. In late 1944, the camp command erected standing cells. The stone chambers were similar to chimneys and measured 75 by 80 centimetres (29 1/2 in × 31 1/2 in). (Note: The surfaces were measured after camps had been liberated, using foundation ruins.) There was a small hatch on top for air, and a narrow door with an iron bar bolted to the cell. The intensified punitive measure saved room and reinforced the punitive agony. There were also standing cells at the Allach subcamp, where the cells were smaller than at Dachau. Some at other camps were bigger, about 90 centimetres (35 1/2 in) square.

For example, the prisoner K. A. Gross and the Polish prisoner Max Hoffmann spent days in the standing cell. Hoffmann described it thus:

It was a terrible state, as I thought that it was over for me, everything was so callous and distant for me. I couldn't lie down, couldn't crouch, the best was to stand, stand, six days and six nights long. [...] You touch the walls on both sides with your elbows, your back touches the wall behind you, your knees the wall in front of you. [...] This is no punishment or pre-trial detention, it is torture, straight forward, Middle Ages torture. I had bloodshot eyes, numb from bad air, I was just waiting for the end.

According to Johannes Neuhäusler, an inmate in the standing cell received a single piece of bread in three days. (Note: Neuhäusler refers here to two clergymen, Theissig from Aachen, and Johann Lenz.) On the fourth day, the prisoner was removed from the standing cell, given a normal camp meal ration and allowed to sleep on a wooden cot. On the next day, the three-day confinement in the standing cell began anew.

The SS did not always adhere to the interruption after the third day. A Czech prisoner, Radovan Drazan, spent eight days without a break in a standing cell. Sometimes, prisoners were not even allowed a brief break from the cell, so that they had sores on their bodies from feces and urine.

=== Auschwitz ===
There were four standing cells at Auschwitz in the basement of Block 11, which measured about one square metre (1 sq yd), and in which four persons were crammed, able only to stand. There was only a five-centimetre-wide (2 in) opening for air, so that prisoners would not suffocate. Punishment in these cells was usually imposed for a period of ten days. Auschwitz survivor Josef Kral testified at the Auschwitz Trials about the standing cells where he had been held for six weeks with three meals during that time, and about how one prisoner was so hungry, he ate his shoes. Commander Rudolf Höss, the camp commander, stated that punishment in the standing cells was limited to three nights, but this was disputed by prisoners. Artur Liebehenschel, Höss' successor at Auschwitz in 1943, removed the standing cells.

== Soviet Union ==
According to Soviet defector Aleksandr Mikhailovich Orlov, the standing cell, called a kishka (Russian for "intestine"), was used as part of the Stalinist purges of the 1930s. After two days in a standing cell, a Secretary of the Tatar Provincial Committee was removed in an unconscious state.

== Chile ==
There were standing cells at Villa Grimaldi, some of which held a single prisoner, others several.

== See also ==
- Little Ease, a cell in the Tower of London

== Sources ==
- Stanislav Zámečník, Das war Dachau. Comité International de Dachau, Luxemburg (2002) pp. 348-350 (in German)
