= Francis Barlow (artist) =

British artist and illustrator

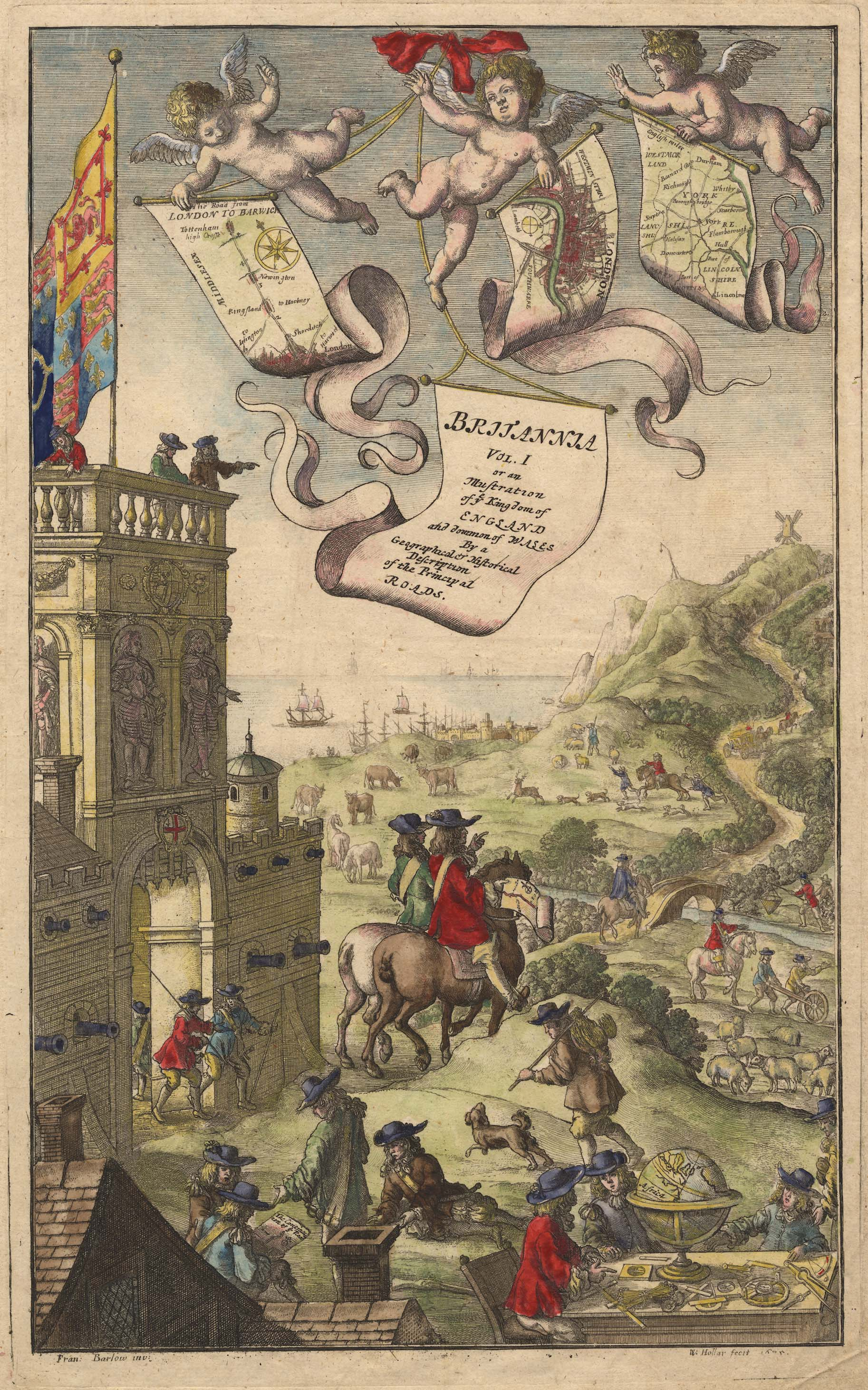
- Frontispiece: Ogilby's Britannia, Vol. I (1675)
- Born: c. 1626; Lincolnshire, England
- Died: 1704 (aged c. 78)
- Known for: Painting, etching, book illustration, comics
- Notable work: A True Narrative of the Horrid Hellish Popish Plot

Francis Barlow (c. 1626 – 1704) was an English painter, etcher, and illustrator.

He ranks among the most prolific book-illustrators and printmakers of the 17th century, working across several genres: natural history, hunting and recreation, politics, and decoration and design.

Barlow is known as "the father of British sporting painting"; he was Britain's first wildlife painter, beginning a tradition that reached a high-point a century later, in the work of George Stubbs. He was furthermore a pioneer in the history of comics by creating A True Narrative of the Horrid Hellish Popish Plot (c. 1682), a picture story about the life of Titus Oates and the Popish Plot, which is told in a series of illustrated sequences where the story is written underneath them and the characters depicted on those images use speech balloons to talk. While it is not the first example of its kind in history, it is one of the oldest which is signed.

== Life ==
Barlow was born c. 1626 in Lincolnshire.

The exact day of Barlow's death is unknown but he was buried on 11 August 1704. Joseph Strutt records that Barlow died in poverty: "not withstanding all his excellency in design, the multitude of pictures and drawings he appears to have made, and the assistance also of a considerable sum of money, said to have been left to him by a friend, he died in indigent circumstances."

== Work ==
Barlow's first major work was the illustration (via twelve plates) of poet Edward Benlowe's Theophila (1652). In Barlow's favour, Bullen said in 1885 that "the volume [was] valued rather for the engravings than for the text." According to Manchester's Chetham's Library, no two copies of Benlowe's Theophila are the same, and no copy survives in good condition. The Victoria and Albert Museum holds two different copies, one of which includes an original drawing by Barlow.

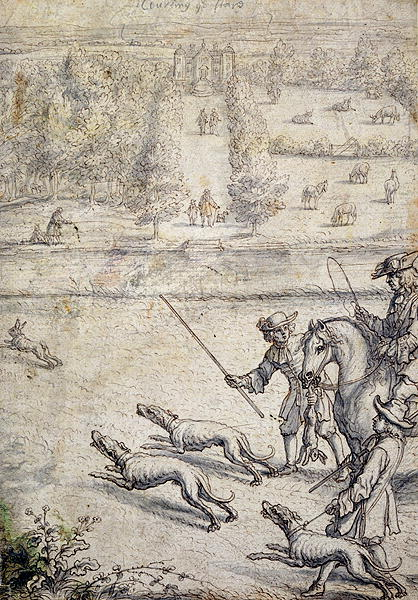
Coursing the Hare, illustration by Barlow to Richard Blome's The Gentleman's Recreation, 1686

Barlow designed the one hundred and ten woodcuts for John Ogilby's translation of Aesop's Fables, published in 1665, several of the plates of which Barlow etched himself.

Hugh James Rose observed in the early 19th century that Barlow's "chief merit [. . .] as a designer, lay in his exactness in the portrayal of birds, fishes, and animals of all kinds, which are executed in a spirited, and in many instances a masterly manner." One example of this gift is in a set of twelve prints by Wenceslaus Hollar of engravings after drawings by Barlow, entitled Several Ways of Hunting, Hawking, and Fishing, invented by Francis Barlow, engraved by W. Hollar, 1671, published by John Overton.

A 2011 article in History Today explored the subtext in examples of Barlow's work: though his wildlife paintings are superb works of art in themselves, they are, at the same time, "full of rich metaphors that shed light on the anxieties and concerns of a Britain emerging from the horrors of civil war". A case in point is A Decoy, Barlow's allegory on the threat posed to England by Roman Catholicism.

In the years leading up to the Glorious Revolution, Barlow became the prime designer of political satire in support of the Whigs; Whig MP Denzil Onslow (1642-1721) acquired or commissioned a number of paintings by Barlow, to decorate his manor house, Pyrford Court. These were more recently housed at Clandon Park, an 18th-century mansion near Guildford, Surrey, becoming one of the largest collections of Barlow's surviving work. Barlow's (and others') work "miraculously" survived a devastating fire at Clandon Park on 29 April 2015.

Examples of Barlow's work can be seen at Ham House (in Ham, south of Richmond in London); examples are held, too, by: Tate Britain, the National Portrait Gallery, the British Museum, and the Victoria and Albert Museum.

Barlow frequently signed the initials of his name, F.B., instead of inserting it at full length, sometimes enclosing the initials in a small circle.

== Assessment ==
Barlow has come to be regarded as a "surprisingly neglected artist". Art historian Mark Hallett accounts for this by noting that Barlow's time is British art's "forgotten era" - one that "has tended to be overshadowed by the achievements of earlier artists, such as Van Dyck, or those that came later, such as Hogarth"; Hallett finds this unjust: Barlow made a significant contribution to what "in reality [. . .] was a remarkably rich, vibrant and cosmopolitan period for the visual arts in Britain."

== Gallery ==
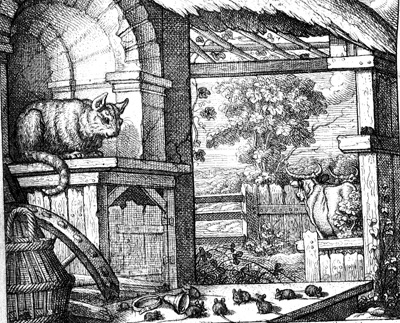
The Mice in Council, from Ogilby's translation of Aesop's Fables (1665)

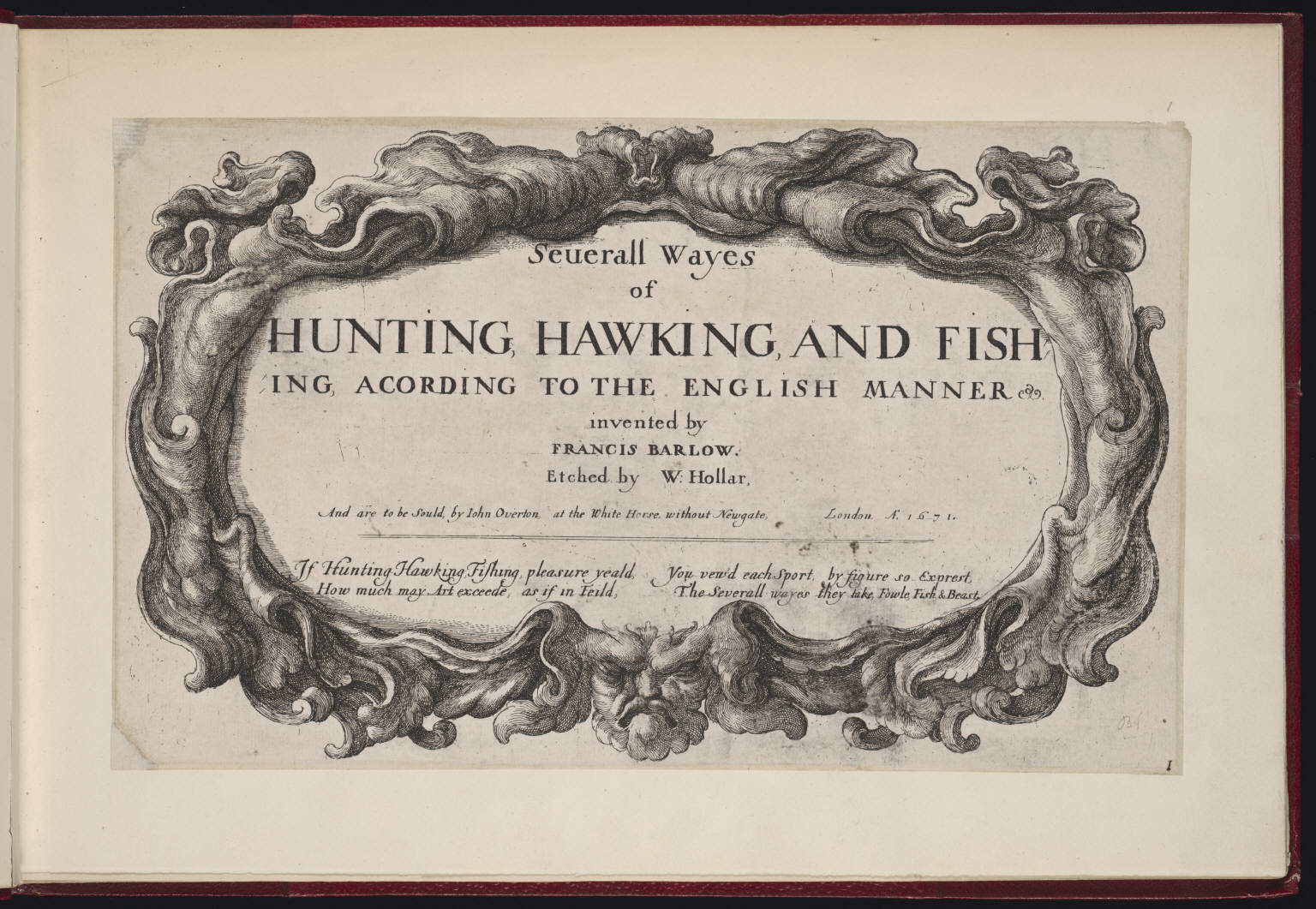
Seuerall wayes of hunting, hawking and fishing according to the English manner, title page; 1671

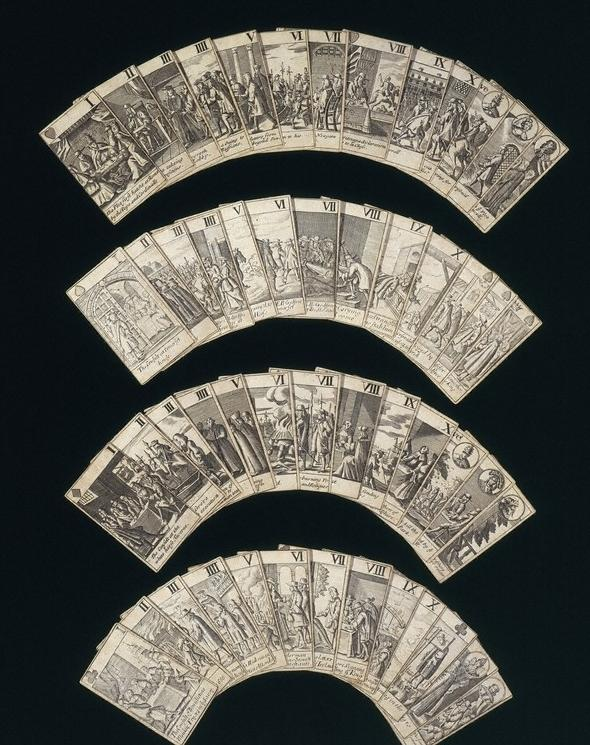
Pack of playing cards depicting the Popish Plot, c. 1679; V&A Museum no. 20366: 1 to 52

== See also ==
- English art
- List of British artists

== Sources ==
- Article on the Lambiek Comiclopedia
- "Francis Barlow, c. 1626-1702"; From: A New General Biographical Dictionary, Projected and partly arranged by the late Rev. Hugh James Rose, B.D., Principal of King's College, London
- Hodnett, Edward. Francis Barlow: first master of English book illustration. London: Scolar, 1978. ISBN 0-85967-350-2. Berkeley: University of California Press, 1978.
- https://www.lambiek.net/artists/b/barlow_francis.htm

Attribution

- This article incorporates text from a publication now in the public domain: Bullen, Arthur Henry (1885). "Benlowes, Edward". In Stephen, Leslie (ed.). Dictionary of National Biography. Vol. 4. London: Smith, Elder & Co.
