= Little Ease =

Torture Method

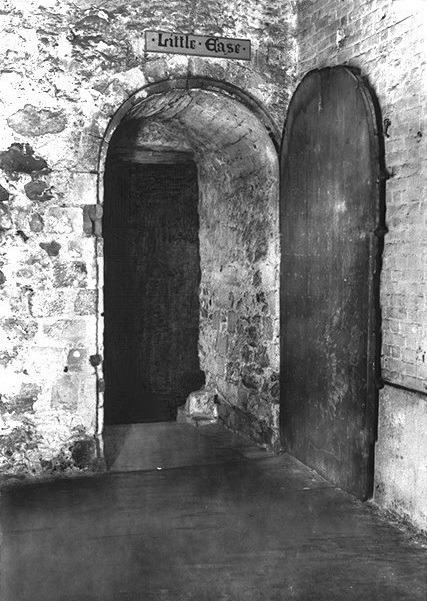
"Chamber of Little Ease" in the Tower of London.

Little Ease was a prison cell located beneath the White Tower in the Tower of London. The lightless cell was designed 1.2 metres (3 ft 11 in) on a side, meaning that while an adult human could be placed inside, any occupant was prevented from being able to either stand, sit, or lie down, meaning it was impossible for him to find any physical position of rest (i.e., "little ease" could be found).

Evidence suggests that Edmund Campion, a Catholic priest in Elizabethan England, was imprisoned for four days in the cell in July 1581. According to Bell (1921), by tradition, Guy Fawkes was housed there in 1605. Another possible inmate was Miles Prance in 1678. Bell also states that there is some doubt that the cell ever actually housed prisoners.

== History ==
The Little Ease cell was a notorious form of confinement used in medieval times. It was a cramped and extremely uncomfortable prison cell that gained a reputation for its oppressive conditions. The cell was primarily used in the Tower of London, a historic castle located in London, England. The exact origin and construction of the Little Ease cell are uncertain, but it is believed to have been built during the medieval period, possibly in the 14th century. The Little Ease was specifically designed to be an uncomfortable and confining cell. It was very small, measuring only about four feet in height and two feet in width. The prisoner was unable to stand up fully or lie down comfortably, as the cell's dimensions did not allow for much movement. The prisoner had to contort their body to fit into the cramped space.

The purpose of the Little Ease cell was to induce extreme discomfort and physical suffering in the prisoner. It was primarily used for interrogation and the extraction of confessions. The cramped conditions and lack of space made it nearly impossible for the prisoner to rest or sleep. The discomfort, combined with the psychological pressure exerted by interrogators, was intended to break the prisoner's spirit and coerce a confession. Additionally, the Little Ease cell was deliberately located in a dark and isolated part of the Tower of London, further enhancing the psychological torment experienced by the prisoners.

The lack of light and fresh air, along with the confined space, created an environment of sensory deprivation that could intensify the prisoner's mental distress. Although the Little Ease cell was infamous for its use in the Tower of London, similar forms of confinement existed in other medieval prisons across Europe. The conditions and dimensions of the cells might have varied slightly, but the general concept of a small, uncomfortable space remained the same.

Over time, the use of the Little Ease cell declined, and it eventually fell out of use altogether.

== Other instances ==
Edmund Bonner, while Bishop of London (1553–1570) maintained a little ease at St Paul's. By day prisoners were displayed in stocks, by night kept in a coal house. In the 17th century a little ease in London's Guildhall was maintained for the confinement of unruly apprentices.

== See also ==
- Standing cell
