= Edmund Berry Godfrey =

English magistrate

Sir Edmund Godfrey
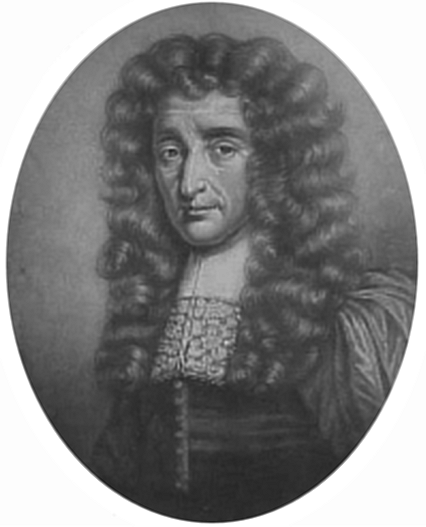
- Born: Edmund Berry Godfrey; 23 December 1621; Sellindge, Kent
- Died: 12 October 1678 (aged 56)
- Body discovered: Primrose Hill, London
- Other name: Edmundbury Godfrey
- Education: Westminster School; Christ Church, Oxford
- Parents: Thomas Godfrey (father); Sarah Godfrey (mother)

Sir Edmund Berry Godfrey (23 December 1621 – 12 October 1678) was an English magistrate whose mysterious death caused anti-Catholic uproar in England. Contemporary documents also spell the name Edmundbury Godfrey.

== Early life ==
Edmund Berry Godfrey was born in Sellindge, Kent, between Hythe and Ashford, the eleventh son of eighteen children born to Thomas Godfrey (1586–1664), a member of an old Kentish family and his second wife Sarah, née Isles. He was named after his godfathers, Edmund Harrison and Captain John Berrie (which led to the misconception that his first name was "Edmundbury"). His father had been MP for New Romney in the Short Parliament and owned Hodiford Farm. He studied at Westminster School and at Christ Church, Oxford and after entering Gray's Inn became a prominent wood and coal merchant. He became justice of the peace for Westminster and received a knighthood in September 1666 for his services during the Great Plague of 1665 when he had stayed in his post regardless of the circumstances. In 1669 Godfrey was briefly imprisoned for a few days because he had the King's physician, Sir Alexander Fraizer, arrested for owing him money. Samuel Pepys' diary of 26 May 1669 mentions that he went on hunger strike, claiming that the Judges had found for him, but the King, Charles II, had overridden them. He was held at the Porter's Lodge of Whitehall Palace.

He was in business with his brother-in-law, James Harrison. Originally their premises was in Greene's Lane (beneath present-day Charing Cross Station) but moved in 1670 to Hartshorn Lane, having use of a wharf. This is now Northumberland Avenue. His grave in St Martin-in-the-Fields has since been concreted over. After his death, his papers were retrieved from a trunk in a coffee house at Swan's Court, by Somerset House. He lived with a maid named Elizabeth Curtis and his secretary, Henry More and a housekeeper, who were questioned at his inquest, where they gave evidence that in their opinion his death was suicide. He was considered eccentric in choosing to socialise with members of the working class instead of persons of his own class, although he did have a number of influential friends, including Gilbert Burnet and Heneage Finch, 1st Earl of Nottingham. Recently, correspondence has been retrieved from Ireland detailing his relations with a faith-healer Valentine Greatrakes — the "Irish stroker". Strictly Anglican in religion, Godfrey had a number of Catholic acquaintances, including Edward Colman, Catholic secretary of the Duke of York, the future James II.

== Peyton Gang ==
In a letter to the Secretary of State, Sir Joseph Williamson, the Lieutenant of the Tower of London named Godfrey as a member of the so-called "Peyton Gang". Sir Robert Peyton was MP for Middlesex and a prominent member of the Green Ribbon Club. This had been founded by Anthony Ashley Cooper, 1st Earl of Shaftesbury after he had become aware of the Secret Treaty of Dover in which Charles II agreed to convert himself and England to Roman Catholicism in return for money paid by the French King Louis XIV. The club, unable to confront the king directly, stirred up popular ill feelings against the Roman Catholic Church. Peyton hand-picked twelve men (including himself and Godfrey) who plotted to replace the King with a republic, nominally led by Richard Cromwell. The founding meeting of the Green Ribbon Club was in the Swan Tavern in King Street, Hammersmith. This was owned by Sir Edmund Godfrey, who left it in his will. It has been said that after Titus Oates had left his deposition with Godfrey, Godfrey warned one of the intended scapegoats, Edward Colman, who was later hanged, drawn and quartered, and who was a personal friend.

== Mystery ==
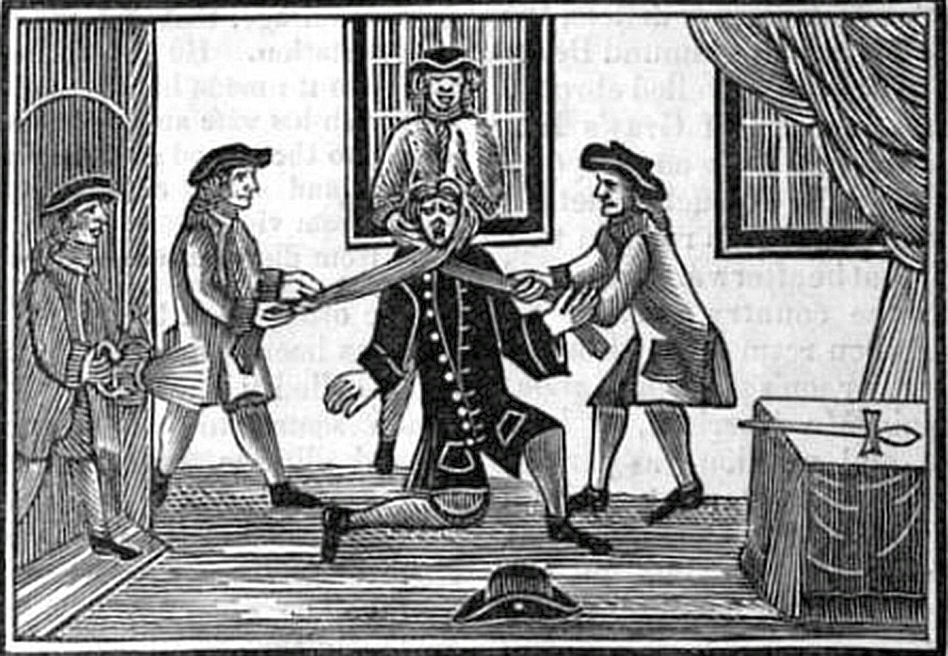
A print depicting the murder of Godfrey

In 1678, Godfrey became involved with the schemes of Titus Oates when Oates invented the Popish Plot and began an anti-Catholic campaign. Titus Oates and Israel Tonge appeared before Godfrey and asked him to take their oath that the papers they presented as evidence were based on truth. Godfrey demanded first to know the contents of the papers and when he had received a copy on 28 September, took their depositions. He may have warned Coleman of the content of the accusations.

When Oates's accusations became known, the public became concerned. Godfrey had supposedly been concerned that he might be one of the victims of the scare, but he took no extra precautions for his own security; his conversation also became increasingly strange, with references to martyrdom and to being "knocked on the head" (the contemporary phrase for assassination). It was this odd behaviour which led his household to conclude that he had committed suicide, despite the medical evidence to the contrary.

On 12 October 1678, he left his house in the morning but did not return home. He was found dead in a ditch on Primrose Hill on 17 October. Godfrey was lying face down and had been impaled with his own sword.

Two committees unsuccessfully investigated the murder. They received conflicting statements about Godfrey's whereabouts before the murder. There was no evidence of a struggle on the spot where the body had been found and Godfrey still had his money and rings. On the other hand, curious people had already trampled the ground when investigators arrived. The body was covered with bruises and a circular mark around Godfrey's neck revealed that he had been strangled and his neck broken. The sword wound had not bled, meaning that Godfrey was already dead when he was impaled, maybe for 4–5 days. The authorities announced a reward of £500 (equivalent to £91,000 in 2025) for information about the murderers.

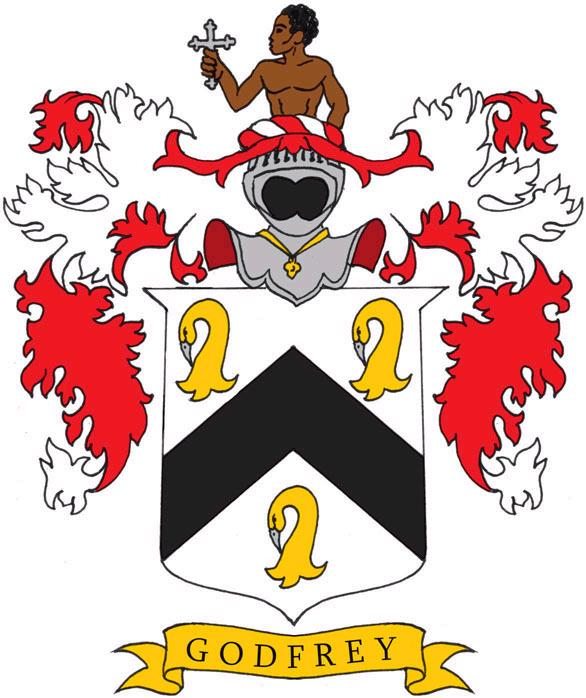
Godfrey coat of arms

Oates exploited the situation and encouraged the public perception that the murder was the work of Catholic plotters. There was a commemorative dagger and medal, sermons and pamphlets. These months were long remembered as "Godfrey's Autumn".

Later "Captain" William Bedloe, who claimed to be a "reformed" Catholic plotter, claimed that he had been taken to Somerset House on the night of 14 October to see the body of Godfrey (although on the previous day he had claimed just the opposite). He said he had seen two men, including Samuel Atkins, secretary to Samuel Pepys.

Atkins was arrested but was able to prove that he had been on a yacht at Greenwich (and extremely drunk) at that time, and the Court directed an acquittal. Bedloe claimed that Catholic plotters had killed Godfrey in order to steal his papers about the depositions (note that the witnesses whose words had been recorded were still alive). He changed his story several times afterwards but the House of Lords retained him as a witness.

Perhaps in response to prompting he named John Belasyse, 1st Baron Belasyse, as the mastermind behind the murder. The King, who was increasingly sceptical about the reality of the Plot, burst out laughing at the notion, pointing out that Belasyse was so afflicted with gout that he could hardly stand up.

== Miles Prance ==
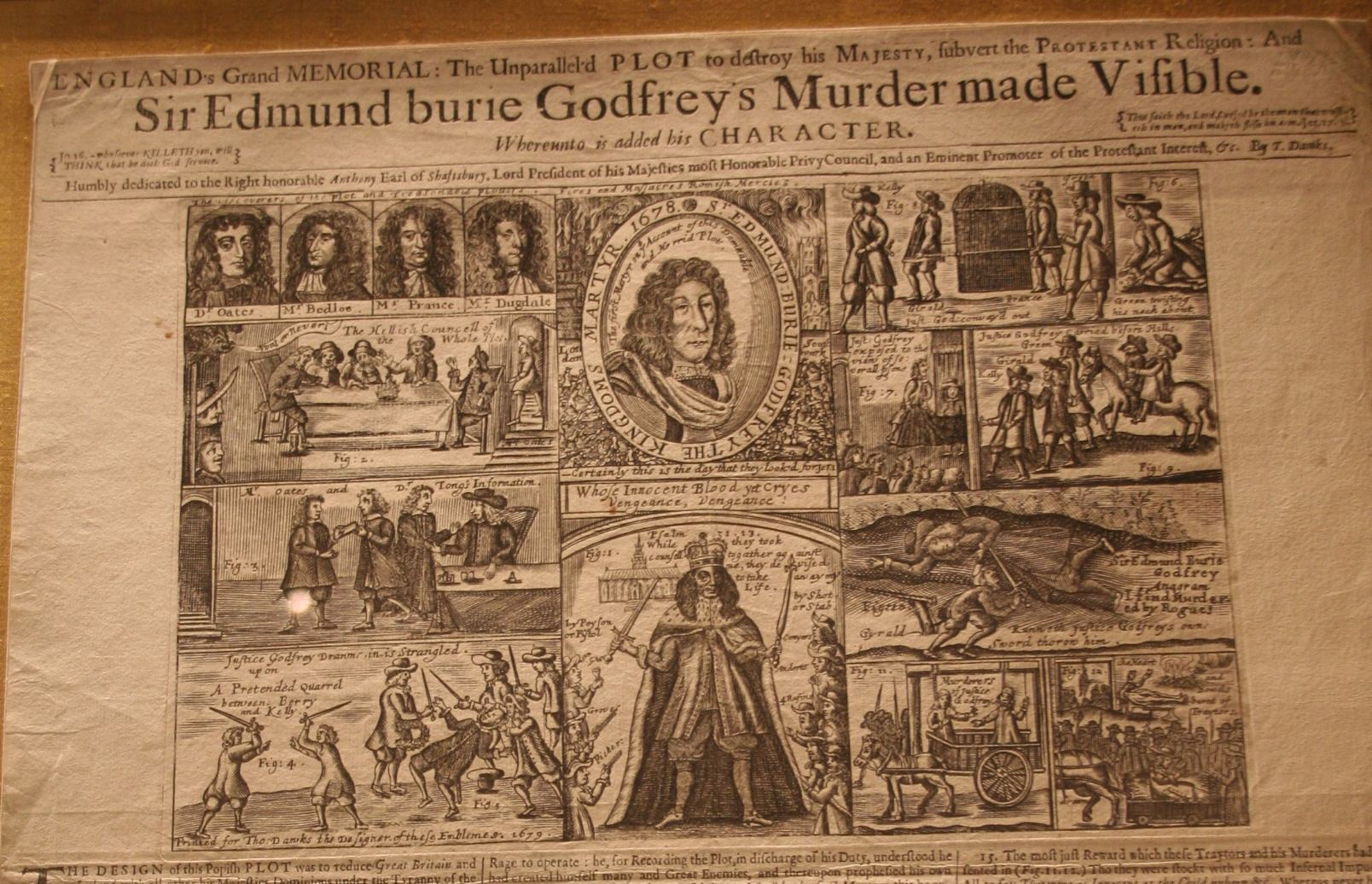
Contemporary broadsheet with the headline "Sir Edmund Berry Godfrey's Murder Made Visible"

On 21 December, Miles Prance, Catholic servant-in-ordinary to England's Catholic Queen consort, Catherine of Braganza, was arrested and taken to Newgate prison. His lodger John Wren (who was in debt to Prance) testified that he had been away for the four nights before Godfrey's body was discovered. Bedloe claimed to recognize him. Both statements are now thought to be lies, but this did not help Prance.

On 23 – 24 December, Prance announced that he had had a part in the murder but that the main instigators were three Catholic priests: Thomas Godden, head of the secular English clergy, and two Irish priests, Kelly and Fitzgerald. These priests witnessed the murder in the courtyard of Somerset House where Godfrey had been lured. Godfrey had been strangled and his body taken to Hampstead. Prance named as the actual killers three working men, Robert Green, Henry Berry and Lawrence Hill, who were arrested. Godden fled the country, while the two Irish priests simply vanished from sight. As with most solutions to the murder, the main weakness was the absence of a plausible motive. Prance could only say, vaguely, that Godfrey had been harassing the two priests in some way, which seems unlikely as he was noted for tolerance in religious matters.

Prance later recanted his confession before the king and the council and was thrown back to prison: he was threatened with torture, and nearly froze to death. As a result, he recanted his recantation and recanted two more times, ending up verifying his original story. At the trial, he was a highly credible witness, although Hill's wife rightly prophesied "we shall see him recant after, when it is too late". The three men were sentenced to death 5 February 1679 and hanged at Primrose Hill. For a time this was known as "Greenberry Hill", because of the hangings of Green, Berry and Hill.

Prance's story was later discredited and he pleaded guilty to perjury. Because the three men were executed on false evidence, and historians accept their complete innocence, the murder remains officially unsolved.

== Solutions ==
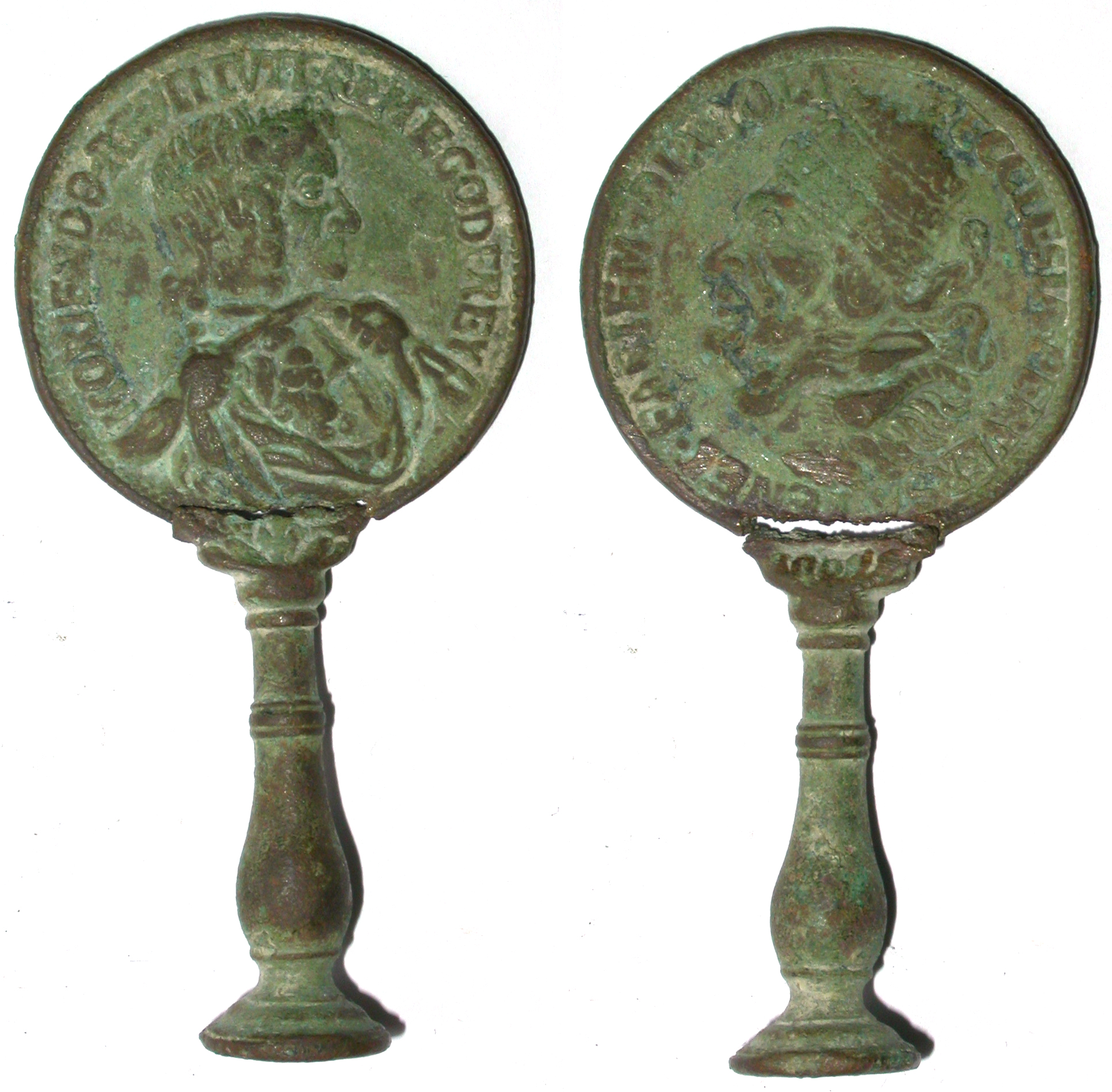
Anti-papist pipe tamper with the head of the pope inscribed with "The church subverted takes on the face of the Devil" and Edmund Godfrey with "E(dmundbury) Godfrey by his death re-established the state", 1678.

There have been many theories of what really happened to Godfrey and who killed him. "To the minds of Kennet, Oldmixon, and Christie the Catholics were responsible. North declared that he was murdered by the patrons of Oates, to give currency to the belief in the Plot. Sir James Fitzjames Stephen hazards that Oates himself was the murderer, and is supported by Mr Traill and Mr Lee. L'Estrange was positive that he committed suicide. Lingard and Sir George Sitwell have given the same verdict. Ralph, Hallam, Macaulay, Ranke, and Klopp pronounce the problem unsolved. Hume has pronounced it insoluble".

Mystery writer John Dickson Carr wrote that suicide by hanging was impossible as the marks on his neck showed that he had had his neck broken with his cravat, which was too short to effect a breakage by "drop". An investigation by pathologist Keith Simpson (appendix in John Dickson Carr's The Murder of Sir Edmund Godfrey) concurred, concluding that if the body had been suspended, the marks would have been higher up on the body than they were. The circumstances of Godfrey's death were established and documented by two doctors, Zachariah Skillard and Nicholas Cambridge, for an inquest held at the White House tavern in Primrose Hill.

Historian J. P. Kenyon argues that neither Catholics nor Whigs had a sufficient motive. The Catholics were almost certain to be blamed for the murder, with calamitous consequences; while neither Shaftesbury nor his colleagues, whatever their faults, were likely to murder an innocent man of their own social class whom many of them knew and liked, on the mere speculation that it would bring them some benefit. He discounts Oates' involvement on the ground that he was a physical coward; Bedloe's conduct suggests that he had heard something about the murder from his underworld connections but was not directly involved.

== Modern analysis ==
American mystery writer John Dickson Carr analyzed all of these theories in The Murder of Sir Edmund Godfrey (1936), exposing their weak points and contradictions. He concluded that Philip Herbert, 7th Earl of Pembroke had taken revenge on Godfrey, who had prosecuted him that April for the murder of Nathaniel Cony. Herbert was convicted of manslaughter and exercised his privilege of peerage to escape punishment, leaving him without the use of that Get Out of Jail Free card which he sorely needed after nearly killing a peer in a dispute shortly after his conviction.

British popular historian Hugh Ross Williamson reached the same conclusion in Historical Whodunits (1955). British professional historian J. P. Kenyon concurred (1974), but allowed that the matter could not now be settled with certainty. The author Stephen Knight suggested in The Killing of Justice Godfrey (1984) that Herbert murdered Godfrey on the orders of the "Peyton Gang".

Alan Marshall's The Strange Death of Edmund Godfrey, Plots and Politics in Restoration London (1999) offers a comprehensive examination of Godfrey's life and death. Marshall follows the principle of Ockham's razor in concluding that Godfrey most likely killed himself. He suggests Godfrey's brothers made the death appear to be a murder to avoid public disgrace and the forfeiture of Godfrey's estate. On the other hand, in her biography King Charles II (1979), Antonia Fraser argues that "this would have been an elaborate, even over-elaborate, way of going about things", and that there "is no proof that such a concealment ever took place". She suggests instead that murder "was the obvious plausible explanation, either by random muggers taking advantage of Godfrey's night walk, or by any one of the enemies a magistrate can acquire in the exercise of his profession", while conceding that "no one theory ... seems able to explain all the known facts."

== Popular culture ==
Godfrey was played by the actor David Bradley in the TV mini-series Charles II: The Power and the Passion.

Godfrey is a conspicuous character in Alison Macleod's 1976 historical novel The Portingale, a biography of Queen Catherine of Braganza. He is depicted as a very honest magistrate, who is reluctant to take part in any persecution, regularly warning both Catholics and Dissenters who are about to be arrested. In a (fictional) scene, Godfrey is depicted as meeting secretly with King Charles II, his brother James and Queen Catherine, and suggesting that they arrest Titus Oates; the King later regrets not having taken this advice. The book does not take a clear stand regarding the circumstances of Godfrey's death.

Godfrey's murder plays a key role in Kate Braithwaite's 2018 novel, The Road to Newgate, where an investigation into Godfrey's death is pivotal in attempts to prove Titus Oates' claims of a Popish Plot are baseless.

Colin Haydn Evans' radio play, "A Walk Across the Green" broadcast on BBC Radio 4 (7 April 1990) depicts Godfrey's murder as the work of Protestant conspirators headed by the republican-leaning Earl of Shaftesbury, to foment further anti-Catholic hysteria. The story is narrated by the mysterious (fictional) character, Thomas Wells, an agent provocateur employed by Shaftesbury.

In the prologue for the 1999 film Magnolia, the 'Greenberry Hill' incident is re-enacted, with Godfrey being portrayed by actor Pat Healy. The character's name was altered to "Sir Edmund William Godfrey".

== Memorial ==
There is a tablet dedicated to his memory in the cloisters at Westminster Abbey.

== See also ==
- List of unsolved murders in the United Kingdom
