= Alexander Fraizer =

Scottish physician

Sir Alexander Fraizer FRS (1610? – 3 May 1681), was a Scottish physician.

== Life ==
Fraizer was born in Scotland about 1610, and graduated M.D. at Montpellier on 1 October 1635. He was incorporated at Cambridge on 9 March 1637, and was elected a fellow of the Royal College of Physicians on 23 November 1641. He was a faithful royalist, followed Charles II abroad, and became his physician. The king placed confidence in him, and he was in turn courted and abused by the factions which grew up among the English exiles on the continent. He was once friendly with Edward Hyde, 1st Earl of Clarendon and at another time avoided communication with him.

Fraizer was declared by the king to be excellent as a physician, and was employed in court affairs. There was probably some resemblance of character which sustained the confidential relation; but the conclusion stated by some contemporary writers, that the physician was as unprincipled as his royal patient, is unsupported by evidence, and no weight attaches to the abuse of Sir John Denham and of Samuel Pepys. Denham's attacks are founded on personal enmity, of which the cause is not now known. Pepys's informant was Pierce, a groom of the privy chamber, who repeated backstairs' gossip. The respect with which Fraizer is mentioned by Dr. Edward Browne, and the fact that on 26 July 1666 he was chosen an elect at the College of Physicians of London, a distinction which his being king's physician would not have obtained for him had his professional character been low, are evidences of his general uprightness.

Sir Edmundbury Godfrey, who dealt in wood, arrested Fraizer for a wood bill of about £30. The bailiffs were beaten by the king's order, but this was not due to any misconduct on the physician's part, but to royal indignation at a supposed breach of a prerogative. Few records of Fraizer's practice remain. He attended Mary, Princess of Orange in the attack of small-pox which ended fatally on Christmas Eve, 1660, and the young James, Duke of Cambridge and Charles, Duke of Kendal in the illness which killed both in 1667, and he superintended the successful trepanning of Prince Rupert's skull on Sunday, 3 February 1666. At Cologne Mr. Elburg was his apothecary.

Soon after the Restoration of Charles II, Fraizer was knighted and in 1663 elected a Fellow of the Royal Society. His wife was made a dresser to the queen.

He died on 3 May 1681. He had a son, Charles, who became a fellow of Trinity College, Cambridge, was physician in ordinary to Charles II, and was elected a fellow of the Royal College of Physicians in 1684.
