= The Swan, Hammersmith =

Pub in Hammersmith, London

Coordinates: 51°29′35″N 0°13′30″W

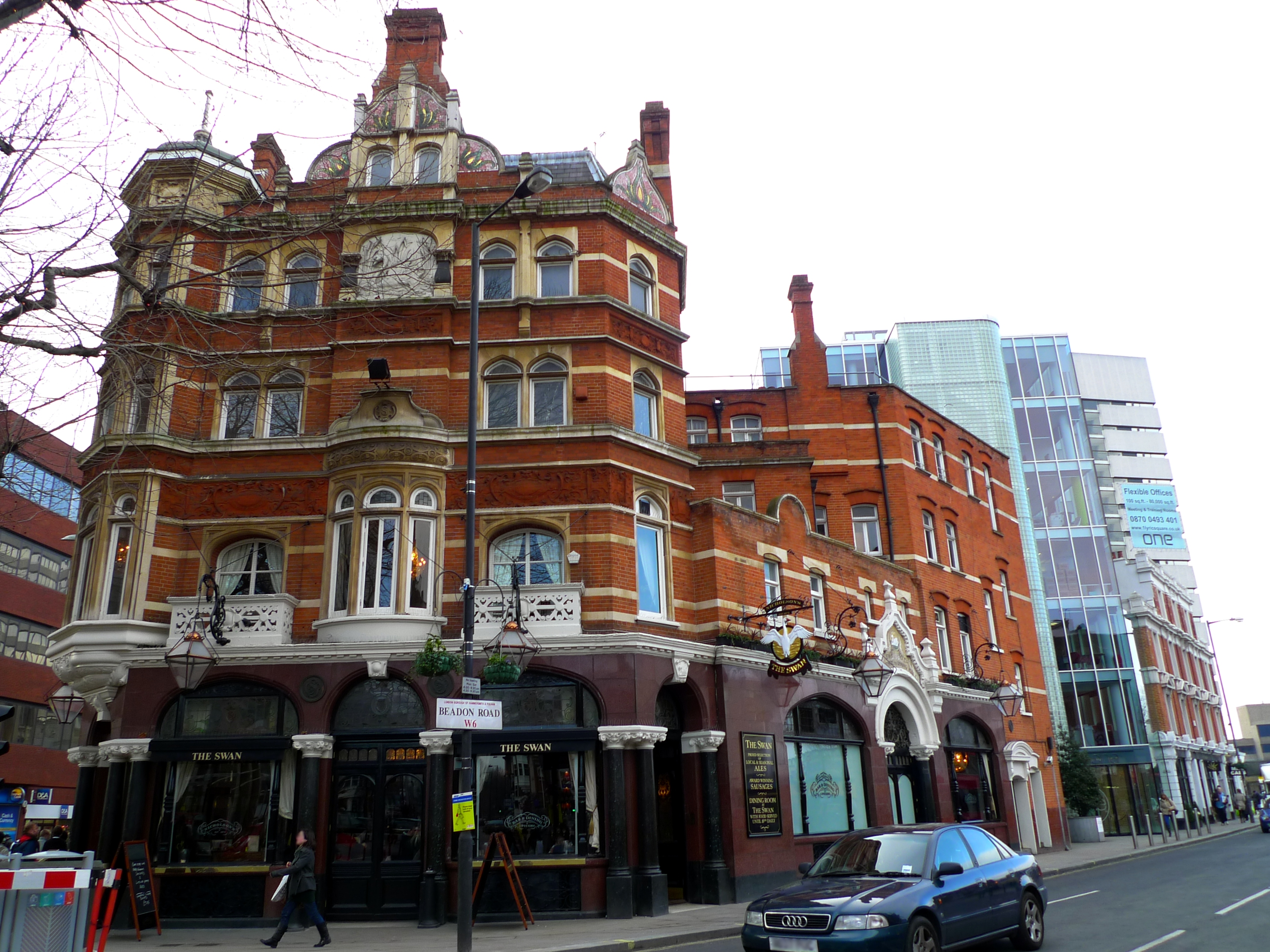
The Swan

The Swan is a Grade II listed public house at 46 Hammersmith Broadway, Hammersmith, London.

It was built in 1901, by the architect Frederick Miller, and is in the Free Jacobean style.
