= Religious life at Stonyhurst College =

Stonyhurst College is Roman Catholic and has had a significant place in English Catholic history for many centuries (including more chequered moments such as the Popish Plot and Gunpowder Plot conspiracies). In 1803 the Society of Jesus was re-established in Britain at Stonyhurst and the school became the headquarters of the English Province. Until the 1920s Jesuit priests were trained on site in what is today the preparatory school. The school continues to place Catholicism and Jesuit philosophy at its core. The present chaplain is Fr. Tim Curtis SJ.

== Jesuit Tradition ==
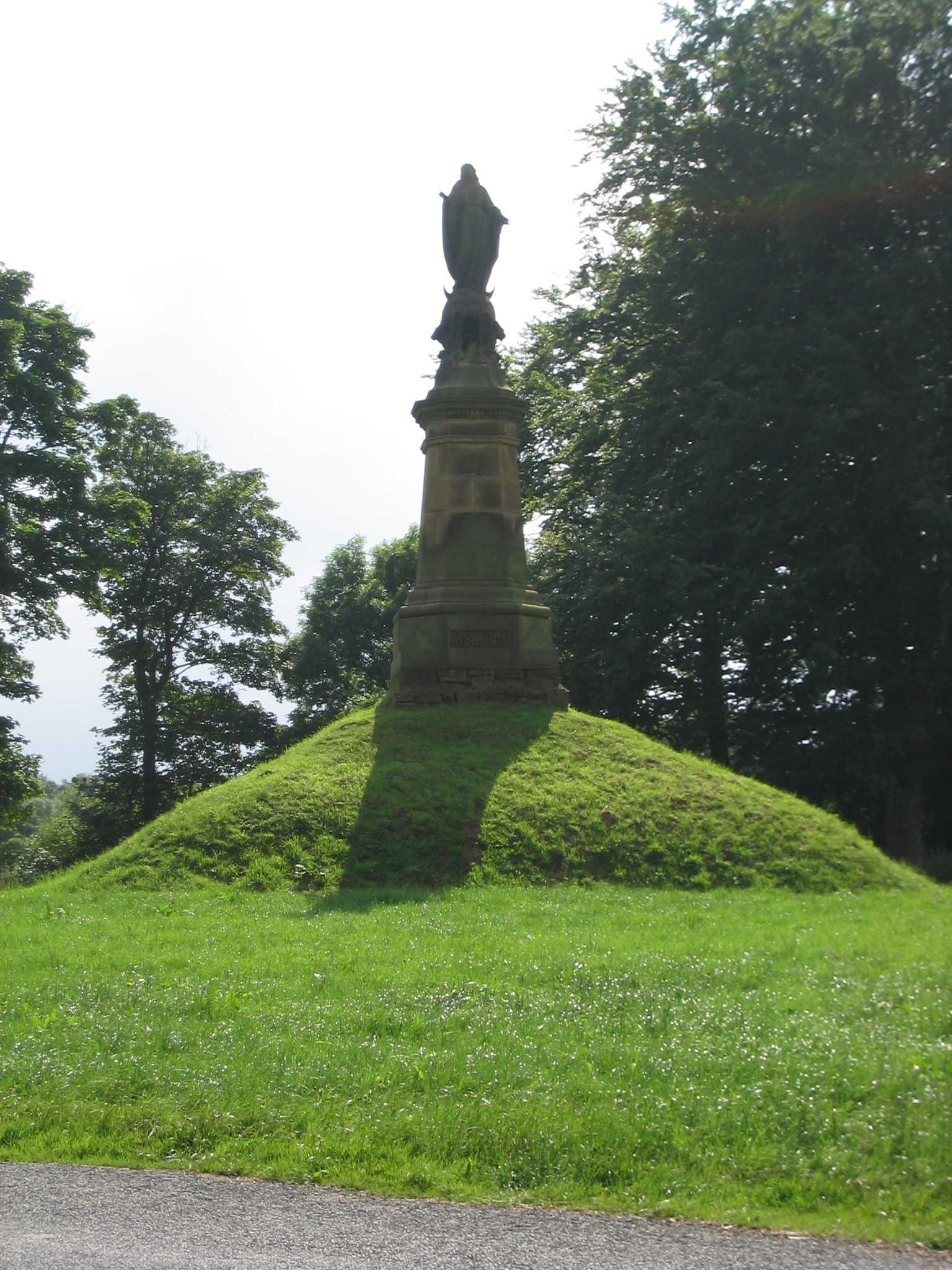
The Lady Statue at the top of the Avenue, erected in 1882.

Stonyhurst is distinguished by the central and distinctive Jesuit ethos "creating men and women for others". The Jesuit mission statement is "Creating people of Good Judgement, Clarity of Thought, and Principled Leaders for the Next Generation".

The Jesuit ethos has three central components:

Creating men and women for others Stonyhurst has a long and well-developed tradition of voluntary service, helping students to understand the problems faced by disadvantaged people. This tradition had evolved today into the Arrupe programme named after the Jesuit priest Pedro Arrupe from Spain. The programme places students in a wide variety of community settings with the aim that every student will have volunteered during their time at school. Students are encouraged to develop and use their skills to contribute to society; Medicine and the Law are popular career choices for example. One of the opportunities that students have through being part of the wider Jesuit community is the "Chiwirangwe" (a Shona word meaning 'we will struggle together') project that twins Stonyhurst with the Jesuit school, St Peter's Kubatana (in Zimbabwe). The project is organised as part of their Companions programme that twins all nine UK Jesuit schools with Jesuit schools around the world. Stonyhurst alumni have the opportunity to take a gap year working in Jesuit projects around the world.

Pupils run, under the supervision of adult trustees, their own charity, Learning to Care, raising money for various causes. St Mary's Hall has its equivalent called Children for Children. Each year the S.C.H.T. (Stonyhurst Children's Holiday Trust) Week takes place at St Mary's Hall. It is funded largely through the sale of Christmas cards and the Poetry Banquet, which is organised and managed by pupils. During the holiday week, as it is known, Poets and Rhetoricians (lower and upper sixth-formers) volunteer a week of their summer holiday in order to look after disadvantaged or disabled children from local schools, giving them an enjoyable holiday, with activities and trips out, which they would otherwise be unable to experience.

Ignatian spirituality This, based on the Spiritual Exercises of St Ignatius of Loyola, is confident, inclusive and outward looking, encouraging the school and its students to engage with the complexities of modern life. A Jesuit Catholic education provides both a solid grounding in the teachings of the Catholic Church whilst also encouraging a robust philosophical engagement with faith and moral issues. The Jesuit retreats that pupils experience aim to lay the foundations for a lifelong personal relationship with God. The school also runs a thriving Easter Retreat each year for the Association, parents and friends.

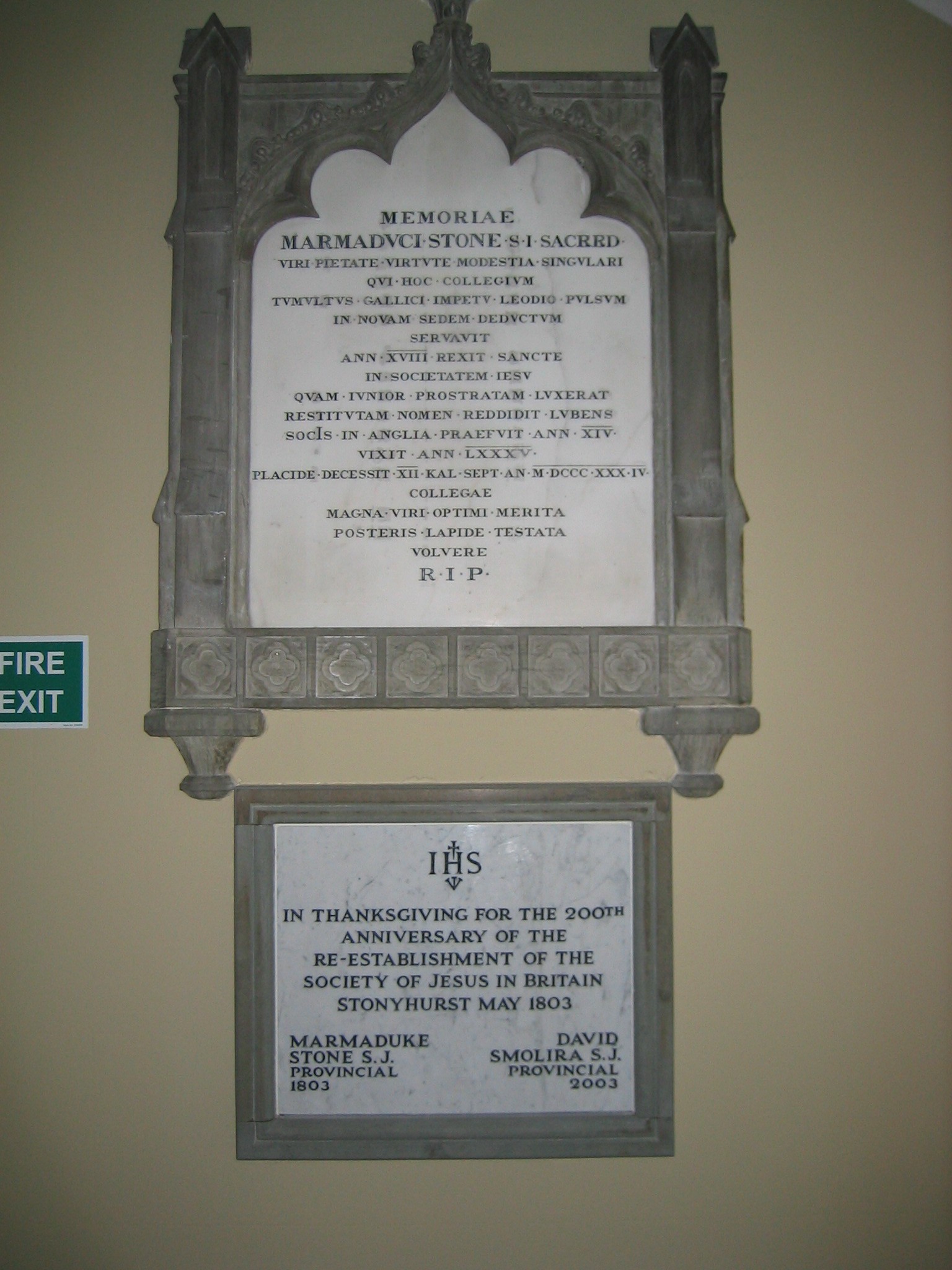
Plaques marking the Jesuit restoration in England at Stonyhurst and its bicentenary in 2003.

Development of Reasoning Skills Well developed reasoning skills are seen as essential both for students to think through their faith and to be effective in the contributions they make to society. The Jesuits remain at the fore in the intellectual life of the Catholic Church. With many universities worldwide, they run colleges in both Oxford (Campion Hall) and London (Heythrop College).

== Jesuit Presence ==
In recent years the number of Jesuits at the school has slowly diminished, but the school nevertheless keeps a very strong connection with the order through its history, retreats, religious life, the governing body and a small Jesuit community which now resides in the Old Infirmary. Since the Second Vatican Council the Jesuits have worked hard to develop a partnership between lay and religious people. Jesuit schools are supported through a strong network co-ordinated by a Director of Education based in London. Roman Catholicism and the Jesuit identity are still very much at the heart of the school, reflected in its ethos and relationship to the community. The spiritual life of the school is led by a Jesuit chaplain and lay chaplaincy team, based in the Emmaus Centre adjoining the Do Room, the former Jesuit Refectory. It is a long-standing practice that pupils write A.M.D.G. in the top left hand corner of any piece of work they do. It stands for the Latin phrase Ad Majorem Dei Gloriam (For the Greater Glory of God). At the end of a piece of work they write L.D.S. in the centre of the page. It stands for Laus Deo Semper (Praise to God Always); both of which are traditional Jesuit mottoes.

== Pater Noster ==
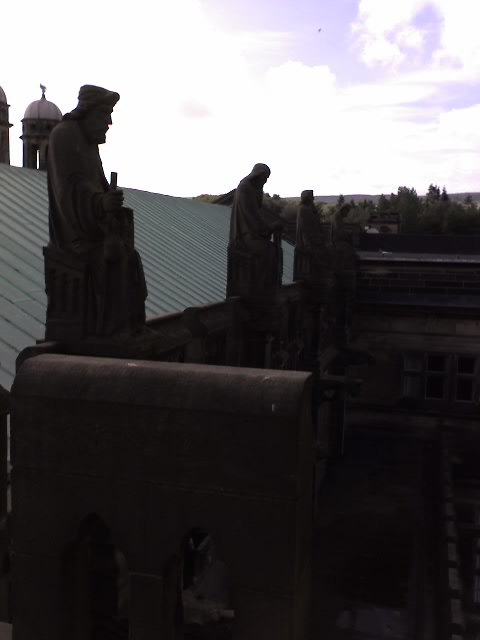
The roof of the Boys' Chapel from the Syntax Wing.

A distinguishing feature of Stonyhurst is the singing of the Pater Noster, the "Lord's Prayer" in Latin. It is not only sung at Mass; pupils learn it by heart and sing it with pride as an anthem before sporting events.

style="font-size:100%;"

Pater noster, qui es in caelis:
sanctificetur Nomen Tuum;
adveniat Regnum Tuum;
fiat voluntas Tua,
sicut in caelo, et in terra.
Panem nostrum cotidianum da nobis hodie;
et dimitte nobis debita nostra,
Sicut et nos dimittimus debitoribus nostris;
et ne nos inducas in tentationem;
sed libera nos a Malo.
Amen.

Our Father, who art in heaven,
hallowed be thy name;
thy kingdom come;
thy will be done,
on earth as it is in heaven.
Give us this day our daily bread.
And forgive us our trespasses,
as we forgive them who trespass against us.
And lead us not into temptation;
but deliver us from evil.
Amen.

== Places of worship ==
The school has one main church, St Peter's, and five chapels: The Boys' (College Chapel), Angels, the St Aloysius Chapel and the St Ignatius Chapel, both within the towers of St Peter's Church, and the Sodality. The latter is the home of the remains of third century Roman convert Saint Gordianus. His bones have rested beneath the altar since 1859, having travelled with the Jesuits from the College of St Omer. He was temporarily removed again in 2006 while the chapel underwent restoration, but has since been returned. The Chapel is once again used by the re-established Sodality.

The interior of the Victorian St Peter's Church was ornately decorated with angels and elaborate patterns until the 1950s when these were white-washed over. The Bayley Room was originally a chapel in the old hall, and at one time the present day Classics Department was a staff chapel. The original Boys' Chapel is now Higher Line Common Room.

== Religious Publications ==
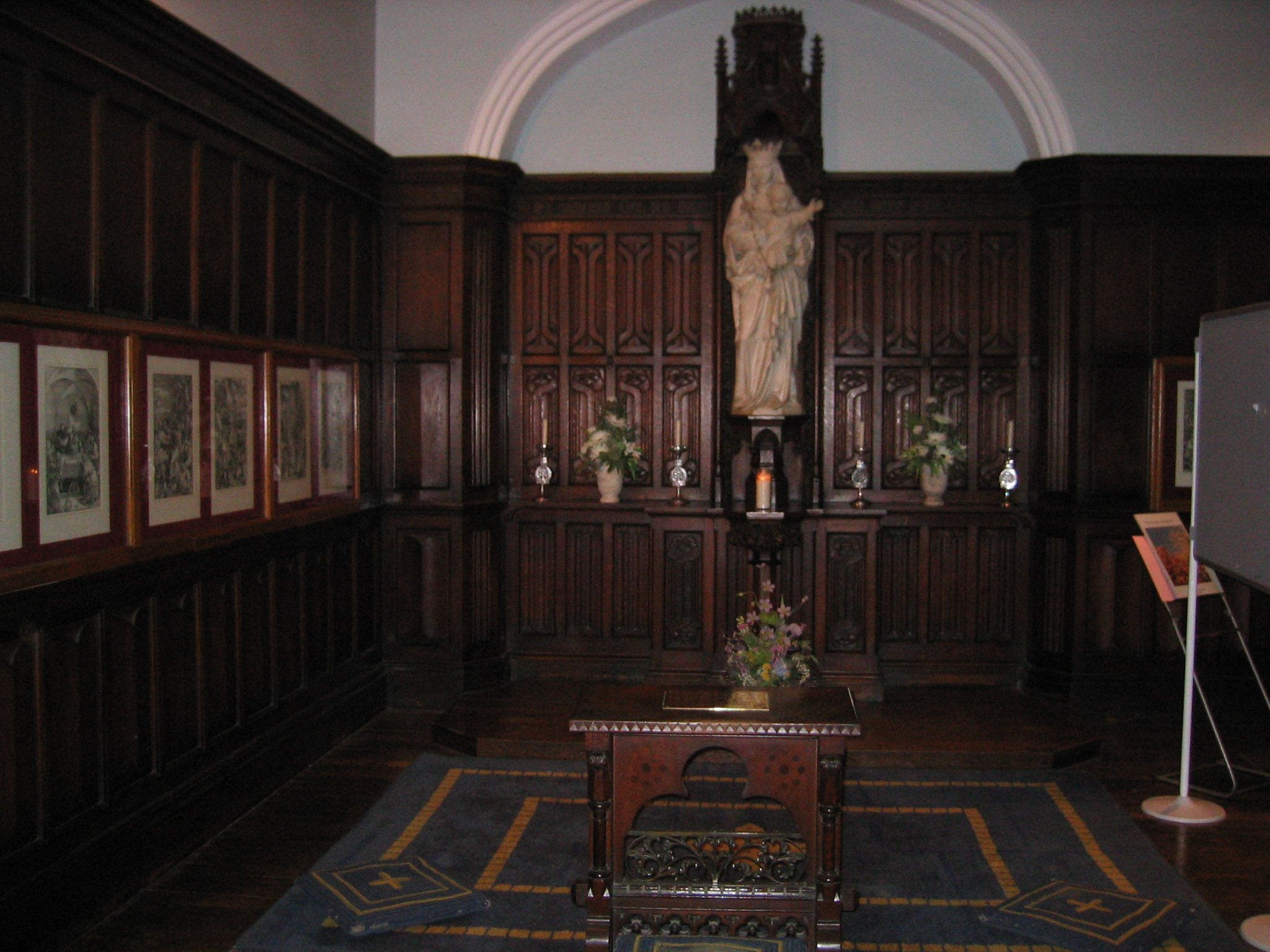
The Boys' Chapel Landing.

The school runs its own publication company, St Omers Press from the original 1838 observatory in the gardens. It was established at the College of St Omer where, in its early days, it concentrated on producing controversial works on theology and devotions to be sent over to England at a time when such literature was illegal there. Its first publications date from 1608 and include John Wilson's English Martyrologe.

Today, the press continues to publish Catholic literature, notably the Glory to God prayer books which feature prayers and photographs contributed by pupils, and are given to leavers of the school as a gift. The College curator has recently acquired an Albion Printing Press which will be used by pupils in a newly designated printing room, a successor to the Octagon Press which fell out of use in the 1980s.

== Patron Saint ==
The school's patron saint is Aloysius Gonzaga. A small chapel in one of the towers of St Peter's Church is dedicated to him, while scenes from his life are depicted in the large murals above the tabernacle of the Boys' Chapel.

== Our Lady ==
The Jesuits' founder, St Ignatius of Loyola, in his Spiritual Exercises asks the reader to pray to Our Lady, and through Our Lady to offer themselves as poor servants to her Son. Following these guidelines the school has always kept the feast days of Our Lady, and has a number of statues and altars dedicated to her. The school has the Lady's Statue, which sits at the top of a grand avenue to the school. The long avenue became a useful place for processions, such as the grand Corpus Christi processions, and to add to the religious experience the statue of Our Lady was erected by the school (in 1882) at the top of it. The statue is a replica of one put up in Rome by Pius IX in honour of the Immaculate Conception.

Inside the school, depictions of Our Lady's life are in all areas of the school. Outside the Boys Chapel, there is a statue of Our Lady with the baby Jesus, and in the past during the month of May, May Verses were exhibited here.

Early on in the development of the Society of Jesus, they founded and promoted the Sodality of Our Lady, their primary organisation for their students until the 1960s, which they used to encourage frequent attendance at Mass, reception of communion, daily recitation of the Rosary, and attendance at retreats. The Sodality Chapel of Our Lady at Stonyhurst is situated near the Arundel Library, and recently the Association re-founded the Sodality.

The school's dedication to Our Lady is also very apparent outside the school, as it has attended the Catholic Association Pilgrimage since 1963/4. The connection to Lourdes is extremely important to the school, and in celebration of the 150th anniversary a new Rosary Garden and statue were built in front of the historic building. Also, in the 1960s the college received a piece of rock from the Grotto, as a gift from the Soubirous family (St Bernadette's family), and this is on show near the Angels Chapel.

== Classroom names ==
Each of the general classrooms on the Upper and Lower Galleries of the school is named after a saint. Formerly they were named after the classes which mostly occupied them but the creation of study centres for each playroom meant that no one class became associated with a particular room. A short biography of each saint hangs on the wall of each classroom.

The general classrooms:

- Clitherow
- Garnet
- Gonzaga
- Southwell
- Xavier
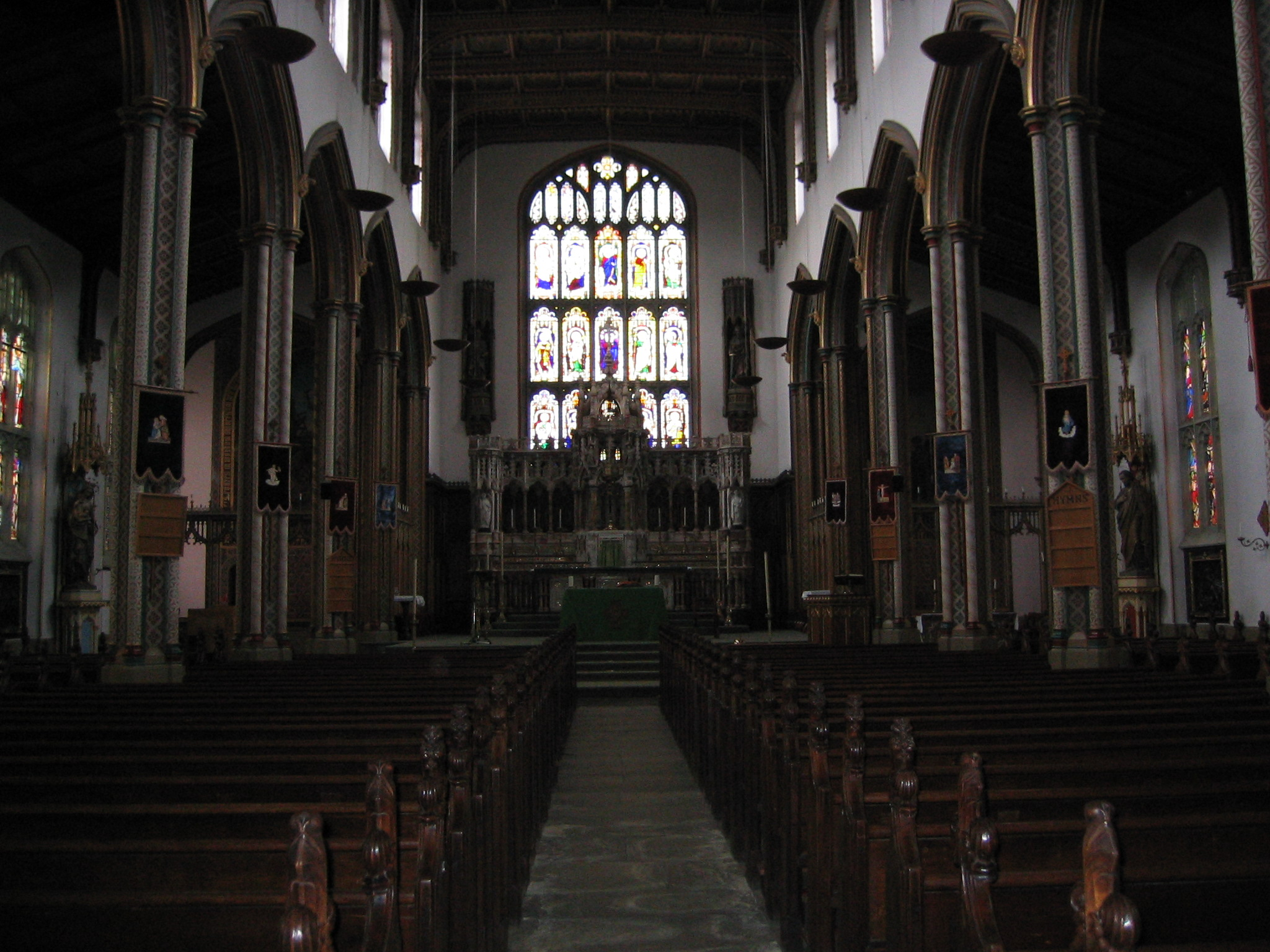
The interior of St Peter's Church.

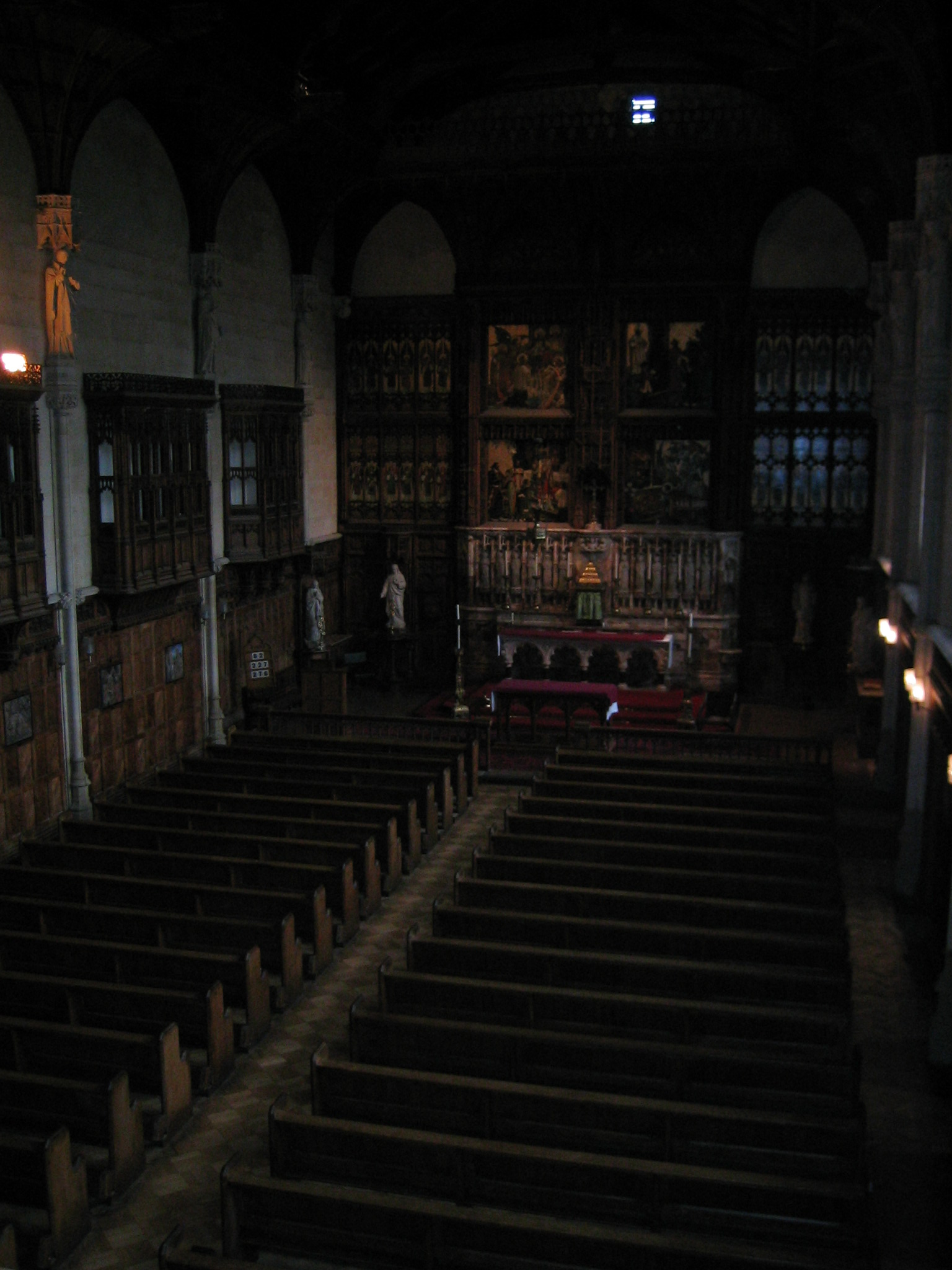
The interior of the Boys' Chapel from the organ loft. The chapel is now known as the College Chapel.

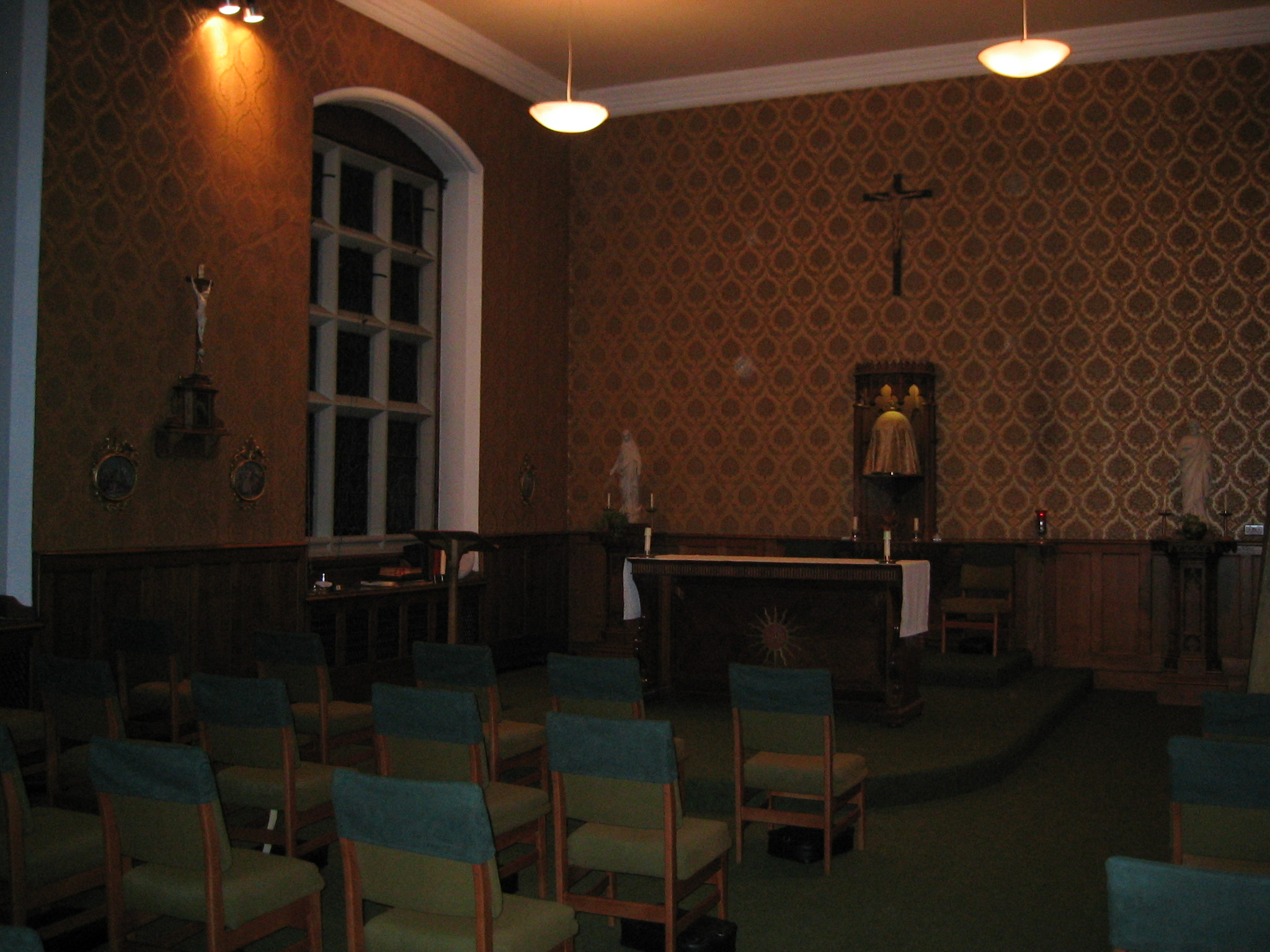
The Angels' Chapel, first floor, Stonyhurst.

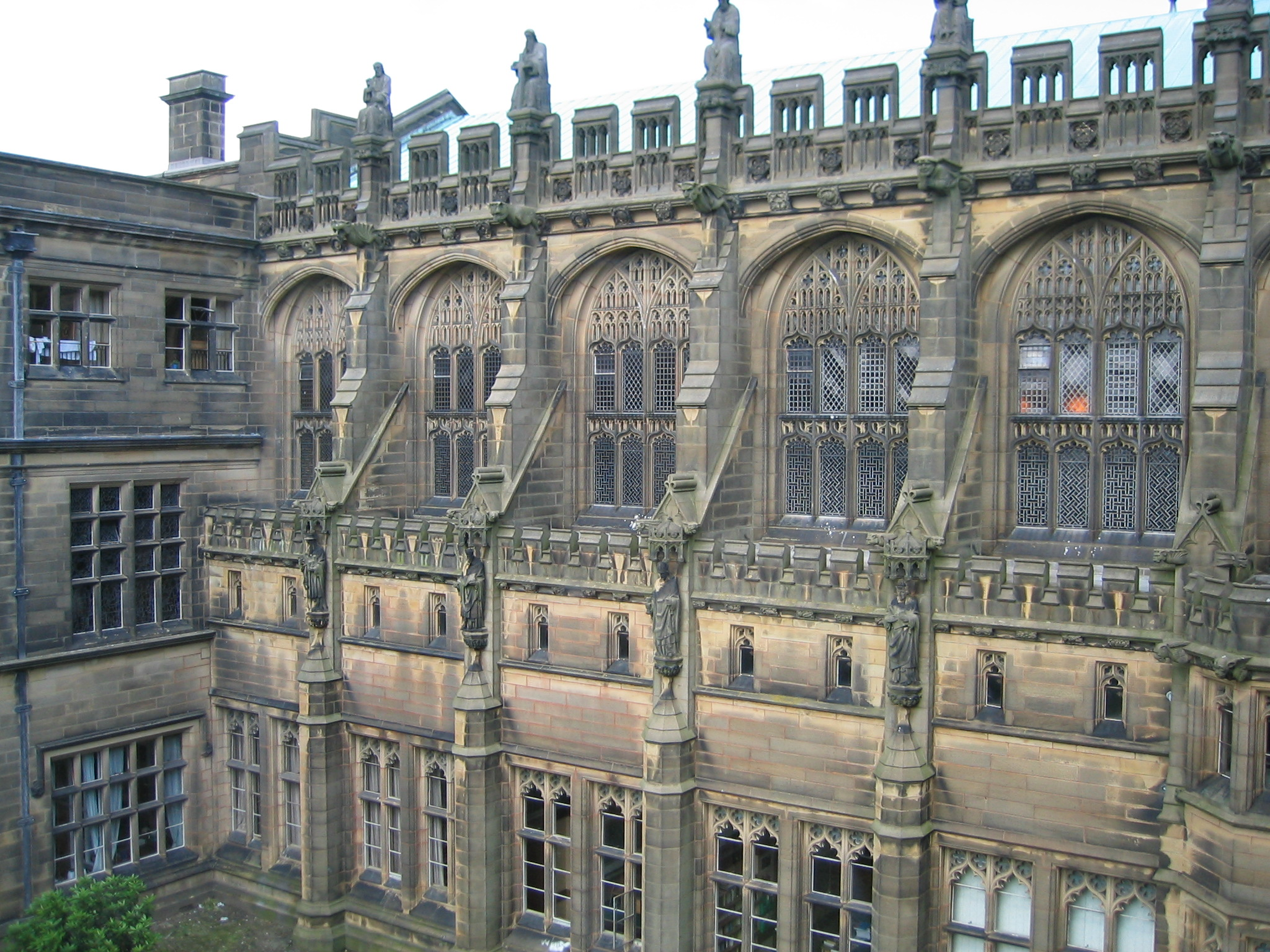
Detail from the exterior of the Boys' Chapel. The room on the ground floor is the Campion room, once the Washing Place.

== See also ==
- Stonyhurst College
- Stonyhurst Estate
- College of St Omer
- Stonyhurst Saint Mary's Hall
- Hodder Place
- Stonyhurst Gospel
- Eagle Aid
- Roman Catholic Church
- Society of Jesus
- St Ignatius, founder of the Jesuits
- St Aloysius Gonzaga, patron saint

== Sources ==
- Chadwick, Hubert, S.J. (1962). St Omers to Stonyhurst, Burns & Oats. No ISBN
- Muir, T.E. (1992). Stonyhurst College 1593–1993, James & James (Publishers) Ltd. ISBN 0-907383-32-7
- The Authorities of Stonyhurst College (1963), A Stonyhurst Handbook for Visitors and Others, Third edition
- Hewitson, A. (Preston, 1878), Stonyhurst College, Present and Past: Its History, Discipline, Treasures and Curiosities, Second edition
- Stonyhurst College website
- Betts, MJW, Our Lady of Stonyhurst. From Catholic Association Pilgrimage website
