= Stonyhurst disks =

A Stonyhurst disk is a transparent circular grid with lines of solar longitude and latitude that can be overlaid on a solar image to reference the positions of sunspots. This system was originally developed at the Stonyhurst College observatory.
