= Stephen Joseph Perry =

English Jesuit and astronomer (1833–1889)

The Reverend Stephen Joseph Perry SJ FRS
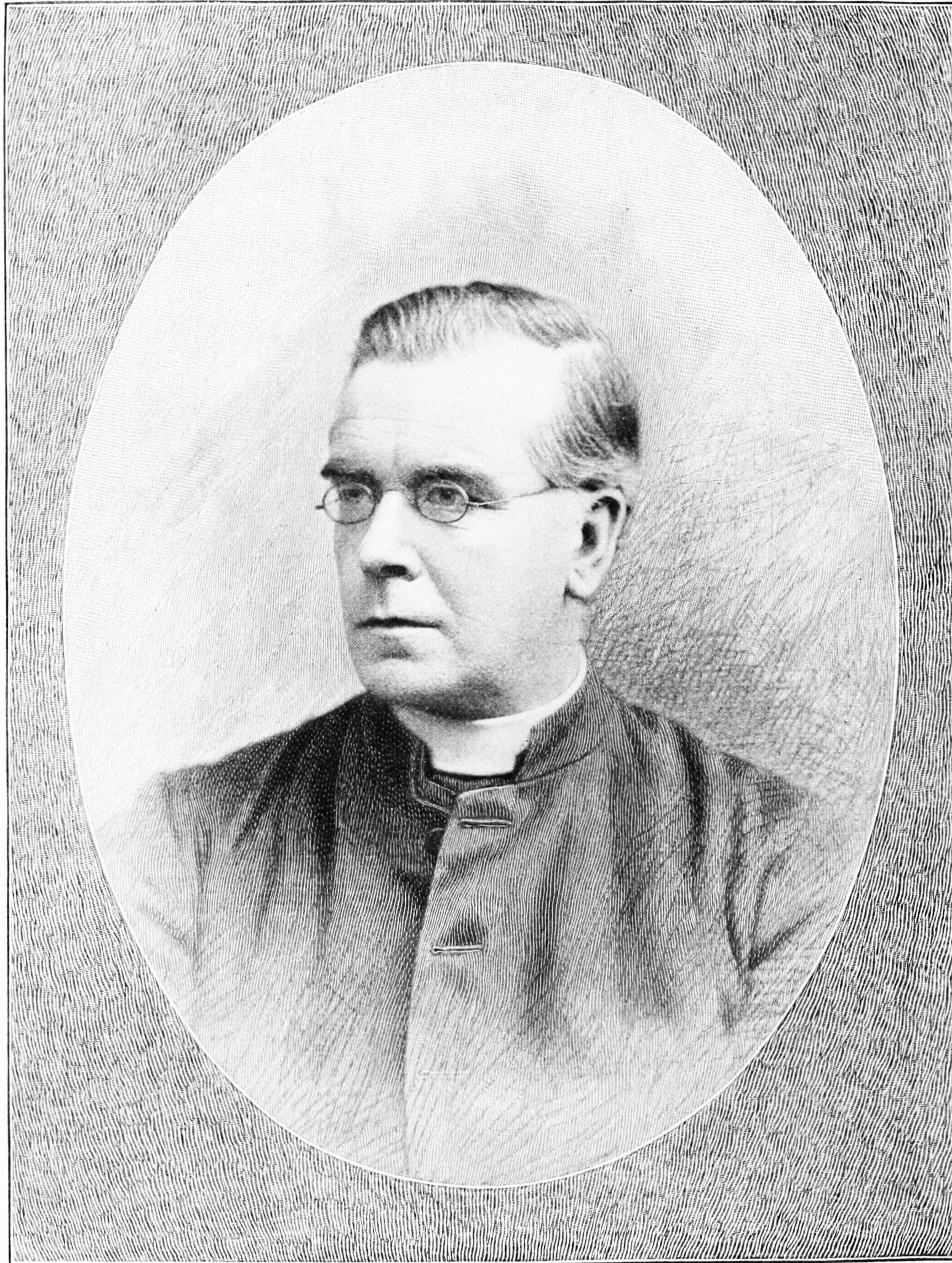
- Born: 26 August 1833; London, England
- Died: 27 December 1889 (aged 56) at sea
- Occupations: Priest, astronomer
- Known for: Astronomy
- Notable work: Stonyhurst College Observatory
- Awards: Fellow of the Royal Society

Stephen Joseph Perry SJ FRS (26 August 1833 – 27 December 1889) was an English Jesuit and astronomer, who was in charge of Stonyhurst observatory. He also made long voyages as a participant in scientific expeditions, particularly in studies of solar eclipses, terrestrial magnetism and meteorology.

== Life ==
Perry was born in London and his father belonged to the Catholic family that owned Perry and Co, of Red Lion Square, who produced steel-nib pens. He suffered from an early age, with a brain inflammation as an infant. His mother died when he was just seven. He studied Gifford Hall, and then at twelve, to the Benedictine College, Douai, where he became interested in mathematics and physics. In 1851 he proceeded to Rome to study for the priesthood. Having resolved to enter the Society of Jesus, he entered the novitiate (1853–5) first at Hodder, and then at Beaumont Lodge, after which he pursued his studies at St. Acheul, near Amiens, and at Stonyhurst College. In consequence of his marked bent for mathematics, he was chosen to direct the Stonyhurst observatory founded in 1838. As training for this position, he was sent in 1858 to attend the lectures of Augustus De Morgan, in London, and those of Bertrand, Liouville, Delaunay, Cauchy, and Serret, in Paris. In the autumn of 1860 he was recalled to Stonyhurst to teach physics and mathematics, and taking charge of the observatory.

In 1863 he commenced his theological studies at St. Beuno's College, North Wales, and was ordained in 1866. He resumed his former duties at Stonyhurst, which during the rest of his life were uninterrupted, save by special scientific engagements.

== Scientific work ==
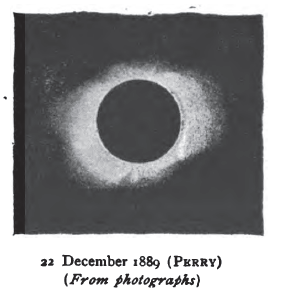
Print of the December 1889 solar eclipse, Perry's final expedition

In company with Father Walter Sidgreaves, he made magnetic surveys, in 1868 of western France, in 1869 of eastern France, and in 1871 of Belgium. In 1870 he was in charge of a government expedition to observe a solar eclipse at Cádiz; at Carriacou (West Indies) in 1886; in Moscow in 1887; and at the Îles du Salut in 1889, on which journey he died.

In 1874 he headed a party similarly sent to Kerguelen in the South Indian Ocean, to observe a transit of Venus. He took a series of observations to determine the absolute longitude of the place, and others for the magnetic elements, at Kerguelen, the Cape, Bombay, Aden, Port Said, Malta, Palermo, Rome, Naples, Florence, and Moncalieri. He likewise drew up a Blue-book on the climate of "The Isle of Desolation", as Kerguelen was called by Captain Cook.

In 1882 he went again with Sidgreaves to observe a similar transit in Madagascar, and he again took advantage of the occasion for magnetic purposes. In 1874 he became a Fellow of the Royal Society.

At Stonyhurst College, while he greatly developed the meteorological work of the observatory, and in the province of astronomy made frequent observations of Jupiter's satellites, stellar occultations, comets, and meteors, it was in the department of solar physics that he specially laboured, paying particular attention to sun spots and faculae. For observation in illustration of these an ingenious method was devised and patiently pursued. Perry acted as director of the Stonyhurst College Observatory between 1860 and 1863, and again from 1868 until his death in 1889.

Father Perry was much in request as a lecturer.

He died on an expedition to observe the December 1889 total solar eclipse from the Îles du Salut in French Guiana. Perry fell ill during his preparations for the observations. He managed to observe the eclipse successfully, despite feeling very weak, completing his scientific objectives in full. As soon as it was over, however, his health deteriorated. He returned to the ship HMS Comus, and died at sea five days later on 27 December 1889. He was buried in the Catholic cemetery at Georgetown, Demerara.

== See also ==
- List of Roman Catholic scientist-clerics
