= Stonyhurst Observatory =

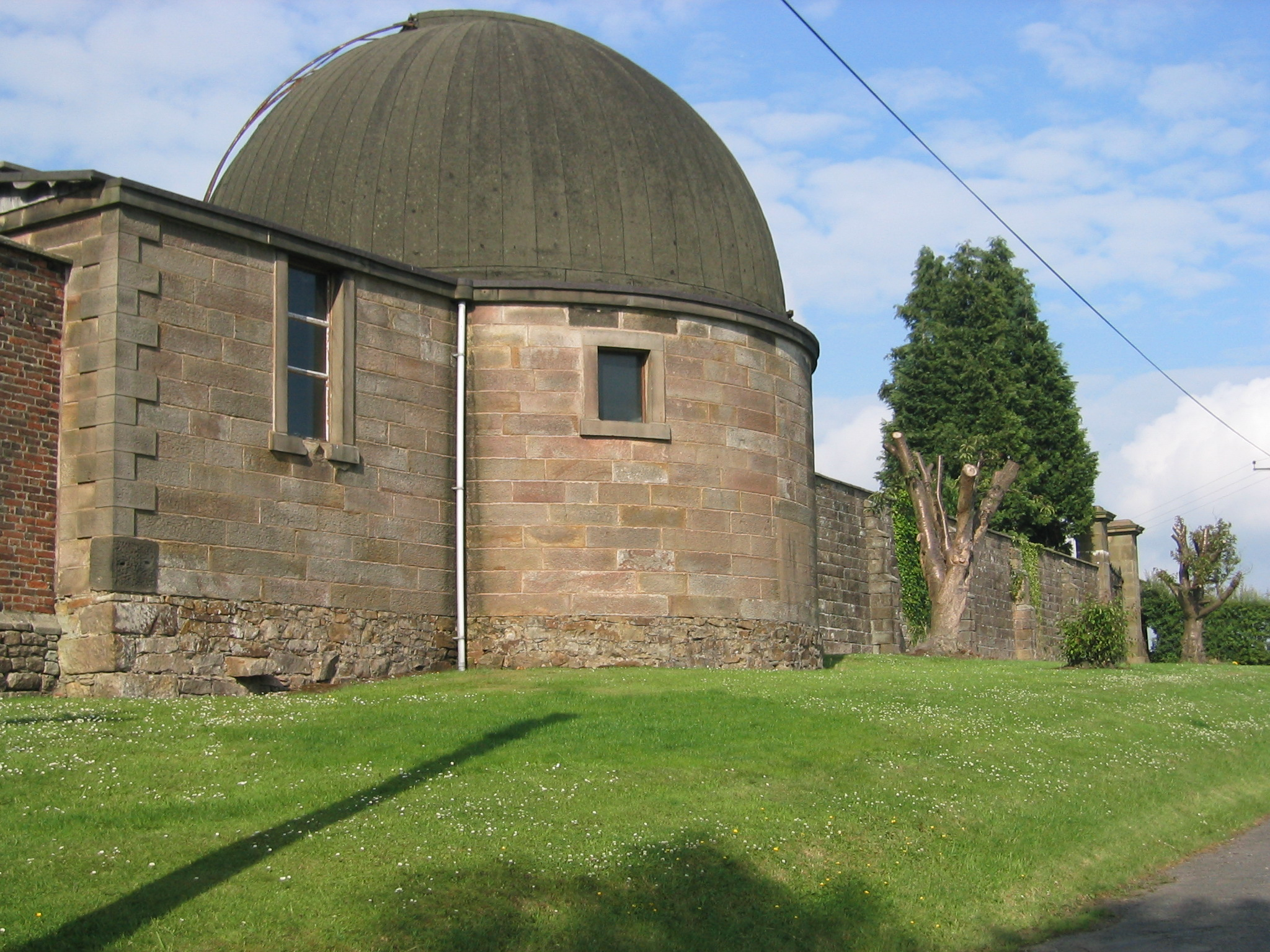
- The rear of the 1866 Observatory
- Organization: Stonyhurst College
- Location: Stonyhurst, Lancashire, United Kingdom
- Coordinates: 53.80°N 2.50°W
- Altitude: 115 m (377 ft)
- Weather: Average temperature: 8.4°C
- Established: 1838
- Website: https://www.stonyhurst.ac.uk
- Location within the United Kingdom Location within Lancashire Location within the Borough of Ribble Valley

The Stonyhurst Observatory is a functioning observatory and weather station at Stonyhurst College in Lancashire, England. Built in 1866, it replaced a nearby earlier building, built in 1838, which is now used as the Typographia Collegii.

The records of temperature, which continue to be taken there, began in 1846 and are among the oldest continuous daily records in the world (the very oldest continuous daily temperature records have been taken at the Old Stockholm Observatory since 1756). In 2004, Stonyhurst replaced Ringway as one of four weather stations used by the Met Office to provide central England temperature data (CET); revised urban warming and bias adjustments have since been applied to the Stonyhurst data.

During the course of the twentieth century, the observatory fell out of use for astronomical purposes and after the Second World War its telescope, parts of which dated to the 1860s, was sold. When its private owner came to re-sell it, the College was able to buy it back and restore it to its original home. See: Stonyhurst Refractor

The observatory is currently run by Classics master Fintan O'Reilly, who also teaches GCSE astronomy. Occasionally access is permitted to the observatory for visitors.

== History ==
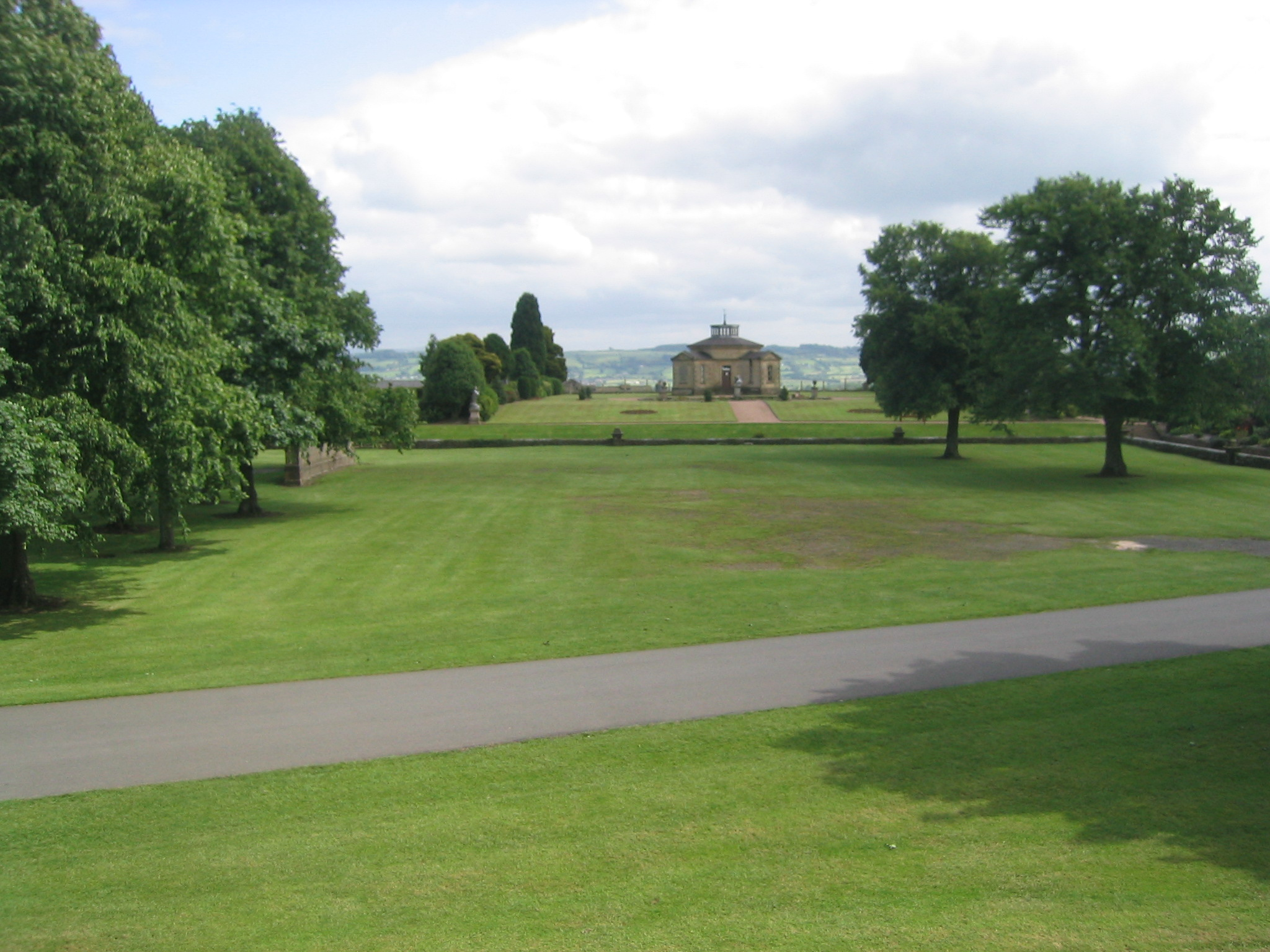
The 1838 observatory amid the gardens at Stonyhurst

The observatory was originally established at Stonyhurst College in 1838, and intended primarily to serve as a meteorological station. With the foundation of the Meteorological Office in 1854, it became one of seven key UK stations. The observatory was managed and operated by the Jesuit priests who ran the school. During the mid-nineteenth century, Fathers Weld, Perry and Sidgreaves, broadened the scope of the observatory's operations to include astronomy, geomagnetrometry and seismology.

In 1858, the observatory was chosen as one of the main observing stations by General Sir Edward Sabine, when he was conducting a magnetic survey of England. Five years later, the observatory's first regular series of monthly geomagnetic observations was inaugurated by Fr Sidgreaves. In 1866, the latter installed a set of self-recording photographic magnetographs, donated by the Royal Society, in a specially constructed underground chamber.

Sidgreaves also carried out original research into the solar spectrum, contained in many papers published in the Monthly Notices of the Royal Astronomical Society. In solar physics he made a long photographic study of the Sun, including hundreds of photographs taken in the violet light of calcium, using a Hilger spectroscope acquired by Father Perry. In this research he showed that the Sun is spectroscopically, a variable star.

During his time as president of the Branch, Sidgreaves carried out original work into the spectroscopy of novae. His work on Nova Aurigae, in 1892, contained some of the first photographs of the spectra of novae ever taken. He recognised in them the similarity between the spectrum of the new star and that of the solar chromosphere, rich in the pink light of ionised hydrogen. Equally significant results were obtained with the spectrum of Nova Perseii, in 1901.

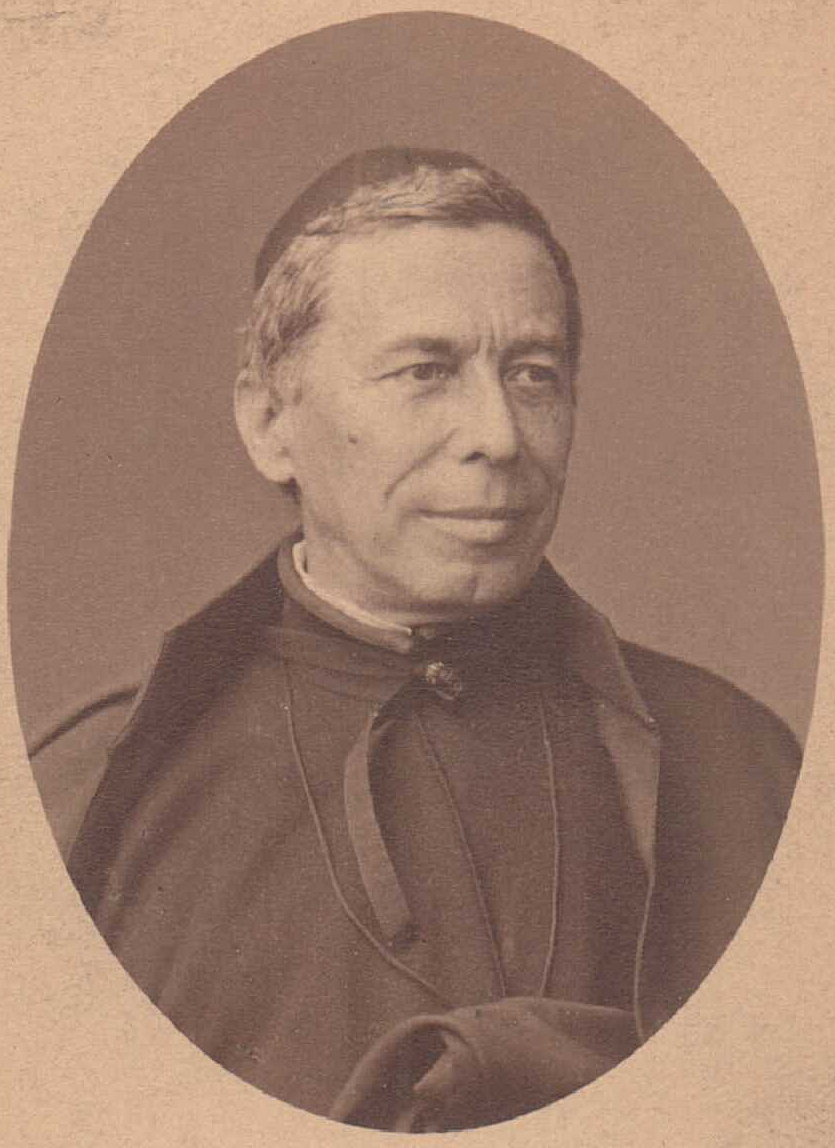
Angelo Secchi

Sidgreaves was particularly interested in the connection between sunspots and fluctuations in Earth's magnetic field. He published several papers on the subject based on observations made at Stonyhurst. In work carried out between 1881 and 1898, he came to the conclusion that although magnetic storms were not directly a result of sunspots, they were due to clouds of electrified particles moving between the Sun and Earth. It is now known that solar mass ejections caused by solar flares can interact with the Earth's magnetic field to produce magnetic storms. They are now of great importance, having been known to disrupt national power-grids and cause expensive damage to Earth-orbiting telecommunication satellites.

In 1848, the year in which Sidgreaves first attended the College, the Italian astronomer, Father Angelo Secchi, of the Jesuit Collegio di Romano Observatory, in Rome, had stayed at Stonyhurst, in retreat from revolutionary troubles in Italy. Stonyhurst's astronomical leanings, particularly in solar observation, apparently stemmed from his time in residence.

== Stonyhurst heliographic coordinates ==
The 'Stonyhurst System of heliographic coordinates' is one of two 'heliographic coordinate' systems used for identifying the position of features on the Sun's surface. In the Stonyhurst system the zero point is set at the intersection of the Sun's equator and central meridian as seen from the Earth. Longitude increases towards the Sun's western limb. A solar feature will have a fixed latitude as it rotates across the solar disk, but its longitude will increase. This is in contrast to the Carrington heliographic coordinate system, where the longitude remains approximately fixed in time. The coordinates take their name from the College where they were devised in the nineteenth century.

== Stonyhurst disks ==
A 'Stonyhurst disk' is used to determine the longitude and latitude of sunspots. The Earth doesn't orbit precisely around the Sun's equator, so through the year the center of solar pictures moves up and down a little more than 7 degrees. This angle varies sinusoidally through the year and is called B0. Earth crosses the Sun's equator about December 7 and June 7 each year. This means that the lines of latitude on the sun do not appear as lines from the Earth, but as elliptical arcs. Sunspots and other features will rotate across the face of the Sun along lines of latitude. Stonyhurst disks are transparent overlays that match the size of whole-disk images of the Sun. These disks provide a graphic means of locating sunspots on the solar disk in reference to lines of latitude and longitude. Different disk overlays are produced for different dates.
