= Charities of Stonyhurst College =

Stonyhurst College and Stonyhurst Saint Mary's Hall are both Catholic boarding schools in the Jesuit tradition in Lancashire, England, which aim at the creation of Men and Women for Others. Under this principle, a number of charities operate within the two schools. The schools are themselves registered charities, and as such are obliged to benefit the wider community under the terms of the Charities Act 2006.

== Children for Children ==
Children for Children is the charity run by pupils of Stonyhurst Saint Mary's Hall under the guidance of adult trustees. It was founded in September 2004. Its primary concern is to work with the Jesuit Musami Mission in Zimbabwe which consists of St Paul’s primary school, a secondary school, hospital, and numerous outstations.

== Learning to Care ==
Learning to Care (LTC) is the primary charity of Stonyhurst College which is run by the pupils under the guidance of adult trustees. It supports a variety of causes, including CAFOD through fundraising activities, such as the Rhetoric Fair, raffles, and concerts.

== Stonyhurst Children's Holiday Trust ==
The Stonyhurst Children's Holiday Trust (SCHT) is organised by pupils in Higher Line. It raises money through the sale of Christmas cards and the Poetry Banquet which takes place annually in February. Proceeds go towards the Holiday Week which takes place at Stonyhurst Saint Mary's Hall each June. Disadvantaged and disabled children are invited from nearby special needs schools and given a holiday by Higher Line pupils where each child is an assigned a carer to look after them twenty-four hours a day, for six days. The week involves a trip to a Windermere and the Sea Life Centre beside the lake, a trip to the zoo, a disco, magician and other entertainment-based activities.

== Stonyhurst War Memorial Trust ==
The Stonyhurst War Memorial Trust was set up to provide for the annual celebration of a requiem Mass for College alumni who have died in active service, and to augment the income of the Stonyhurst Association Charitable Trust or of the Stonyhurst Association Charity.

== Stonyhurst Association ==
The mission of the Stonyhurst Association is: "to unite and associate past and present pupils and friends of Stonyhurst in the carrying on, promotion, advancement or support of all or any of the following charitable purposes (whether in the United kingdom or elsewhere) that is to say the advancement of education and of the Roman Catholic Religion, the relief of poverty, relief and prevention of sickness, disease and physical or mental disability, as the committee shall from time to time in its absolute discretion think fit".

== Stonyhurst Association Charitable Trust ==
The Stonyhurst Association Charitable Trust raises money to advance the further education of current and former pupils of the College.

== Eagle Aid ==
Eagle Aid is a fund-raising initiative for the poor and disadvantaged, started by the Stonyhurst Association in 1987, to support major projects considered to have appeal to all Jesuit alumni.

=== Projects ===
Projects in 2006 included:

- Land-Mine victims in Kosovo
- Help for the Christians in the Holy Land
- Makumbi Mission, Zimbabwe
- Kangemi Mission, Kenya
- Nava Jeevan, India
- The Homeless in Lisbon

== See also ==
- Stonyhurst College
- Stonyhurst Saint Mary's Hall
