= Stonyhurst College =

Co-educational Catholic school in Lancashire, England (UK)

Coordinates: 53.8471°N 2.4713°W

- Schola Saxosylvanensis; Collegium Saxosylvanum
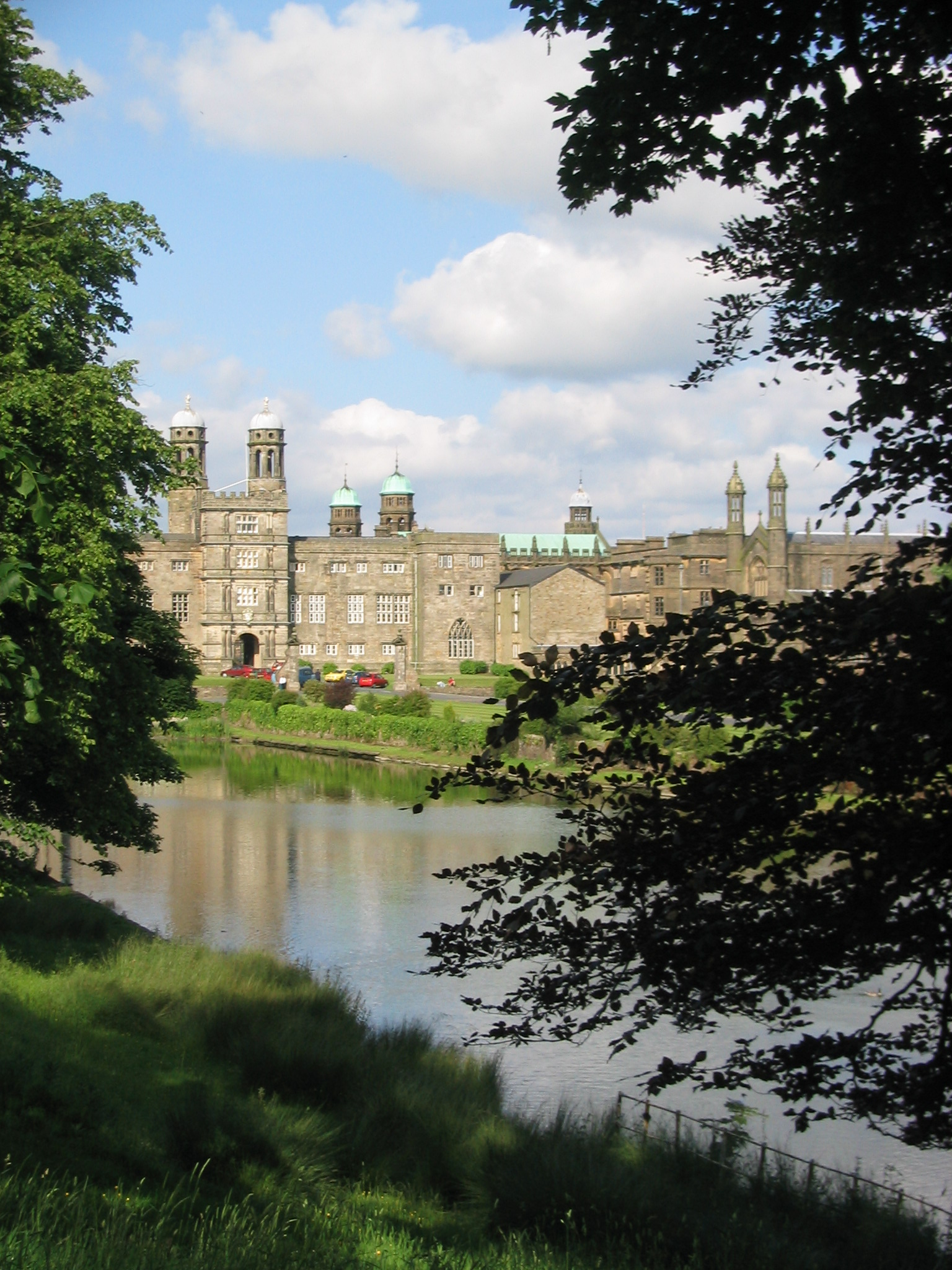
- Motto: Quant Je Puis (Old French)
- Motto in English: As much as I can
- Type: Public; Private co-educational Catholic boarding and day school
- Established: 1593; 433 years ago
- Founder: Robert Persons under the patronage of King Philip II of Spain
- Religious affiliation: Catholic Church (Jesuit)
- Headmaster: William Doherty
- Students: 524
- Location: Clitheroe, Lancashire, BB7 9PZ, England
- Former pupils: Old Stonyhursts
- Patron saint: Aloysius Gonzaga
- Colours: Green and White
- Website: stonyhurst.ac.uk

Stonyhurst College is a co-educational Catholic public school providing education for boarding and day pupils, adhering to the Jesuit tradition. It is based on the Stonyhurst Estate, next to the village of Hurst Green, in Lancashire, in the United Kingdom. It occupies a Grade I listed building. The school has been fully co-educational since 1999. It is a member of the Headmasters' and Headmistresses' Conference.

A precursor institution of the college was founded in 1593 by Father Robert Persons SJ at St Omer, at a time when penal laws prohibited Catholic education in England. It relocated to Stonyhurst Hall in 1794, having moved already to Bruges in 1762 and Liège in 1773, after an old boy, Thomas Weld (of Lulworth), granted it the Stonyhurst estate. It provides boarding and day education to approximately 500 boys and girls aged 11–18. On an adjacent site, its preparatory school, St Mary's Hall, provides education for boys and girls aged 3–11.

Its alumni/ae include three Saints, twelve Beati, twenty-two martyrs, seven archbishops, seven Victoria Cross winners, a Peruvian president and prime minister, a New Zealand Prime Minister, a signatory of the American Declaration of Independence and a number of writers, sportsmen, politicians, and European royals.

== History ==
=== Stonyhurst Hall ===
The earliest deed concerning the Stanihurst is held in the college's Arundell Library; it dates from approximately 1200. In 1372, a licence was granted to John de Bayley for an oratory on the site. His descendants, the Shireburn family, completed the oldest portion of the extant buildings. Richard Shireburn began building the hall, which was enlarged by his grandson Nicholas who also constructed the ponds, avenue and gardens. Following his death, the estate passed to his wife and then to sole heir, their daughter, Mary, the Duchess of Norfolk.

=== The college ===
Fr Robert Persons SJ

The story of the school may be traced back to establishments in St Omer in what was then the Spanish Netherlands in 1593, where a college, under the Royal Patronage of Philip II of Spain, was founded by Fr Robert Persons SJ for English boys unable to receive a Catholic education in Elizabethan England. As such it was one of several expatriate English schools operating on the European mainland. In 1762, the Jesuits were forced to flee and re-established their school at Bruges. The school was moved in 1773 to Liège, where it operated for two decades before moving to Stonyhurst on 29 August 1794.

The number of students increased during the 19th century: the Society of Jesus was re-established in Britain at Stonyhurst in 1803, and over the century, student numbers rose from the original twelve migrants from Liège. By the turn of the following century, it had become England's largest Catholic college. Stonyhurst Hall underwent extensive alterations and additions to accommodate these numbers; the Old South Front was constructed in 1810, only to be demolished and replaced with larger buildings in the 1880s. A seminary was constructed on the estate, and an observatory and meteorological station erected in the gardens. The 20th century saw the gradual hiring of a mostly lay staff, as the number of Jesuits declined. The seminary at St Mary's Hall was closed, and the school discontinued its education of university-aged philosophers.

Since the Second World War, the buildings have been refurbished or developed. Additions include new science buildings in the 1950s and 1960s, a new boarding wing in the 1960s, a new swimming pool in the 1980s and Weld House in 2010. The school became fully co-educational in 1999.

== Hodder Place, St Mary's Hall and Hodder House ==
The original preparatory school to Stonyhurst, Hodder Place, came into the hands of the Jesuits as part of the estate donated by alumnus Thomas Weld. Originally used as a novitiate, it became a preparatory school to the college in 1807.

St Mary's Hall, on an adjoining site to Stonyhurst, was built as a Jesuit seminary in 1828 (extended in the 1850s) and functioned until 1926, when the seminarians moved to Heythrop Hall. The poet Gerard Manley Hopkins, and John Tolkien, son of J. R. R. Tolkien, trained as priests there. During World War II, the English College left Benito Mussolini's Italy and occupied the hall. After their return to Rome, St Mary's Hall opened as a middle school in 1946. At the same time, Hodder Place continued to educate those aged eight to eleven, until its closure and conversion into flats in 1970. Hodder Place pupils moved up to St Mary's Hall to form Hodder Playroom. As successor to Hodder Place, St Mary's Hall claims to being one of the oldest surviving preparatory school in Britain.

In 2004, the old gymnasium at St Mary's Hall was converted into new nursery and infant facilities named Hodder House, for those aged three to seven.

== Religious life ==
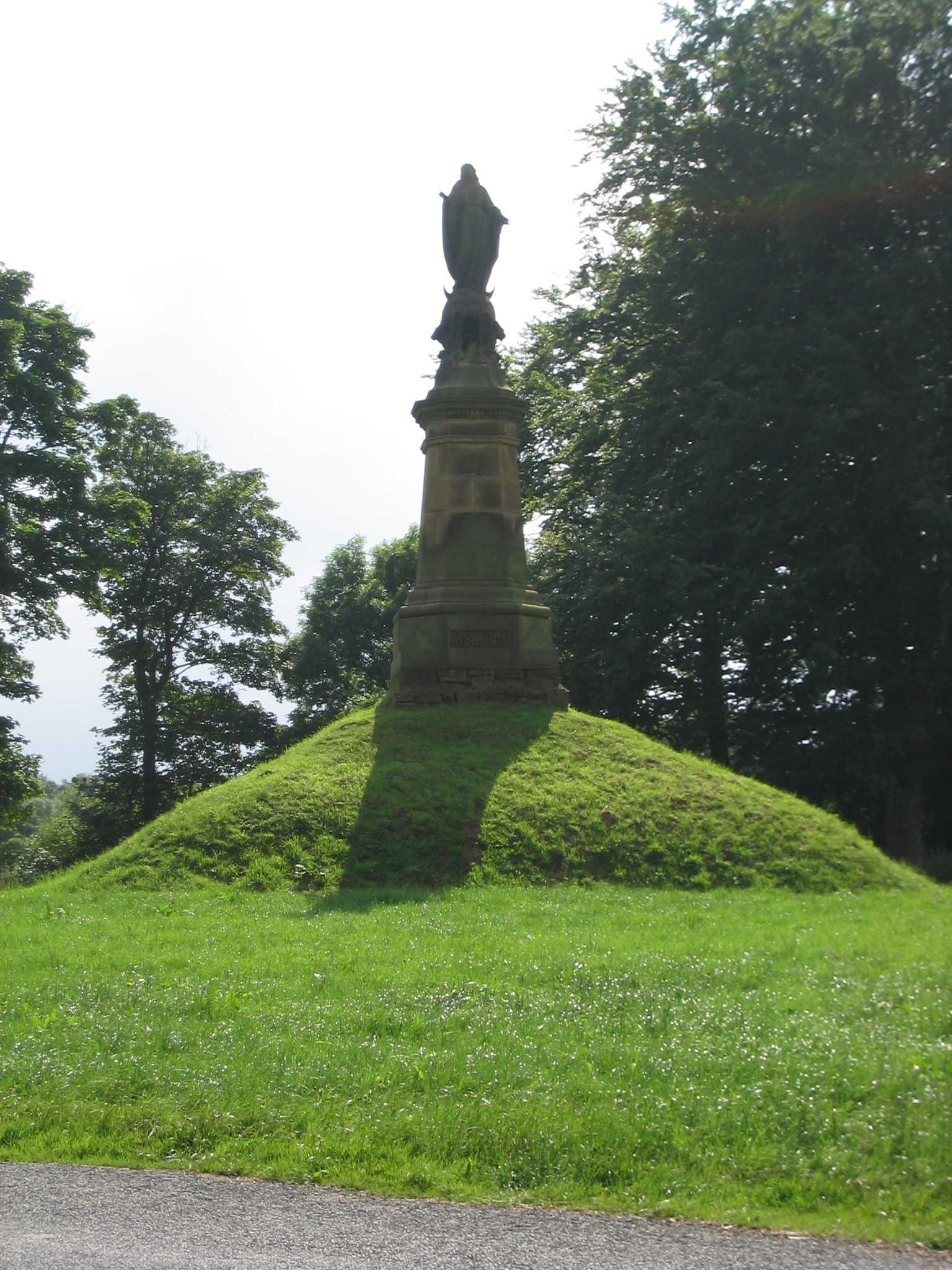
The Lady Statue at the top of the Avenue, erected in 1882

The college is Catholic and has had a significant place in English Catholic history for many centuries (including events such as the Popish Plot and Gunpowder Plot conspiracies). It was founded initially to educate English Catholics on the continent in the hope that, through them, Catholicism might be restored in England.

After the school settled in England in 1794 and the Society of Jesus was officially re-established in Britain in 1803. Stonyhurst remained the headquarters of their English Province until the middle of the century; by 1851, a third of the province's Jesuits were based there. Until the 1920s, Jesuit priests were trained on site in what is today the preparatory school. There was a drop in vocations after World War I and the seminary was closed. The number of Jesuits teaching at Stonyhurst fell to a third of the staff within a decade. Since then, the Jesuit presence has been in decline, but the school continues to place Catholicism and Jesuit philosophy at its core under the guidance of a Jesuit-led chaplaincy team and the involvement of the Jesuits in its governance.

It is a long-standing practice, as with many Jesuit schools around the world, that pupils write A.M.D.G. in the top left hand corner of any piece of work they do. It stands for the Latin phrase Ad Majorem Dei Gloriam which means For the Greater Glory of God. At the end of a piece of work they write L.D.S. in the centre of the page. It stands for Laus Deo Semper which means Praise to God Always. These are both traditional Jesuit mottoes.

=== Chapels ===
The school has one main church, St Peter's, and five chapels: the Boys' Chapel, the Chapel of the Angels, the Sodality Chapel, the St Francis Chapel and the St Ignatius Chapel. The last two are both within the towers of St Peter's Church. The Sodality Chapel is the home of the relics of the 3rd-century Roman convert St Gordianus. The Jesuits brought his remains from the College of St Omer and held them beneath the altar since 1859. His bones were temporarily removed in 2006 while the chapel underwent restoration, but they have since been returned. The chapel is again used by the re-established Sodality. Adjacent to the Old Infirmary is the Rosary Garden, a place for spiritual contemplation, at the centre of which is a stone statue of the Blessed Virgin Mary. St Peter's Church underwent repair and refurbishment in 2010–11.

== Charitable status ==
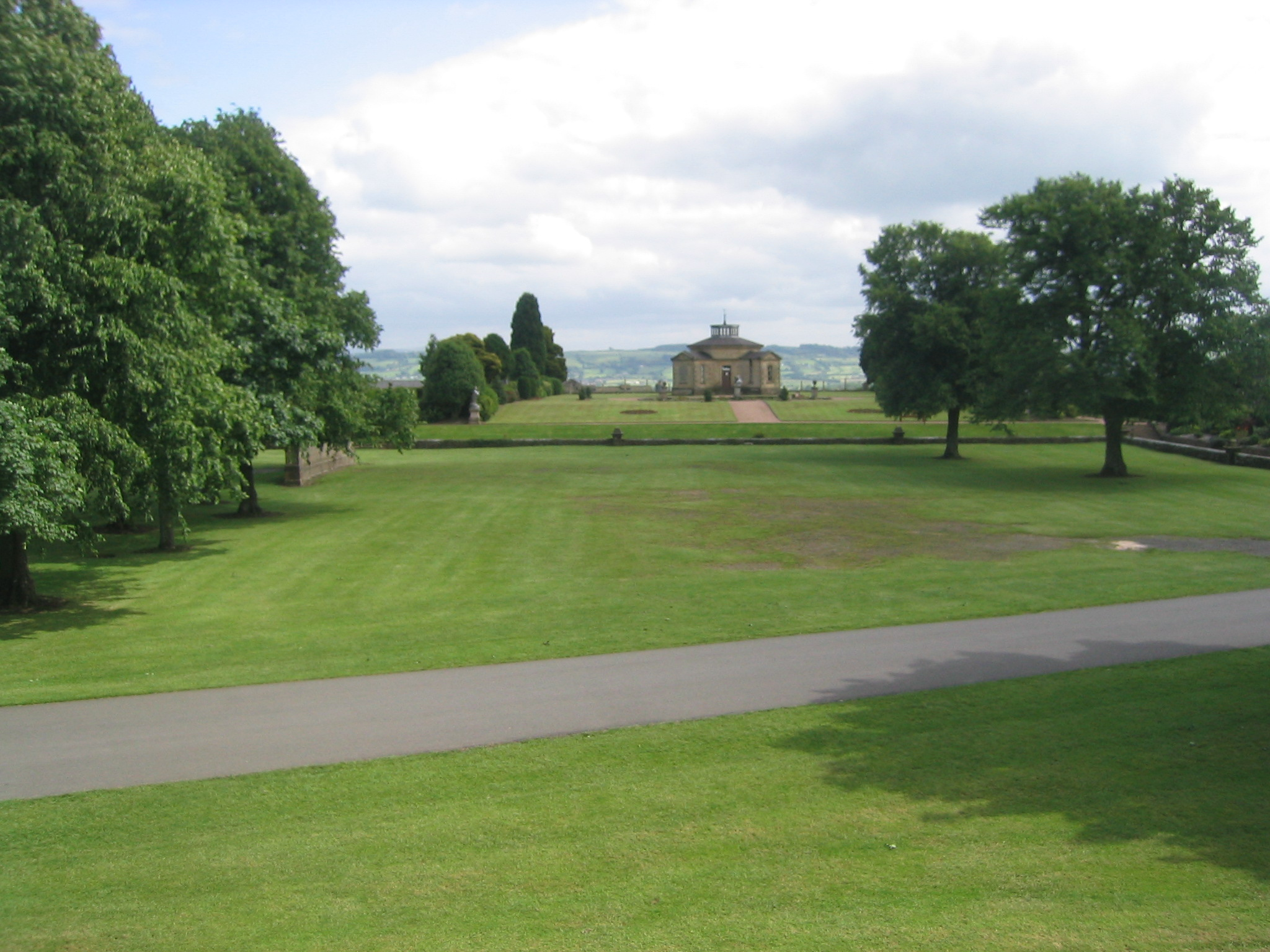
Public gardens and Typographia Collegii

As a registered charity, Stonyhurst is obliged to provide benefits to the wider community under the terms of the Charities Act 2006. As such, the college is home to the local Catholic parish church, which receives worshippers from Hurst Green every day. Its sports facilities, including the swimming pool and all-weather pitch are available for public use; the latter was used for competitors training for the London 2012 Olympic Games. Much of the estate has public access. Many of its facilities such as its swimming pool, leisure complex, golf course, grounds and museum are open to the public. The school has relationships with several state schools, arranging shared activities with their pupils, in particular those serving special needs children. In addition, the school makes available some places to pupils offered on scholarship, bursaries or free of charge; almost a third of current pupils receive financial support for their places.

== Motto ==
The French motto Quant je puis, 'As much as I can' refers to all-round development of the individual. It is inherited from the Shireburn family who once owned the original mansion on the site; the family emblem is emblazoned, in stone, with the motto, above the fireplace in the Top Refectory.

== Academic ==
In 2024, 88% of GCSE students attained 9-4 grades; there is a 99% pass rate at A-Level; and 89% pass rate for the IB Diploma. 100% of A-Level leavers take up places at universities (10% to Oxbridge) or on gap year schemes. The school's most recent inspection rated much of the education and pastoral provision as 'outstanding'.

Education during the college's early history was based on St Ignatius' Ratio Studiorum, with emphasis upon theology, classics and science, all of which still feature prominently in the curriculum. The educational practice, observed at the College of St Omer, of dividing a class into Romans and Carthaginians continued long after the migration to Stonyhurst but is not employed today; each pupil would be pitched against an opponent with the task of picking up on the other's mistakes in an attempt to score points.

Until Catholics were admitted to Oxbridge in 1854, Stonyhurst was also home to "philosopher gentlemen" studying BA courses under the London Matriculation Examination system. Their numbers began to fall after 1894 and the department was closed in 1916.

== Libraries and collections ==
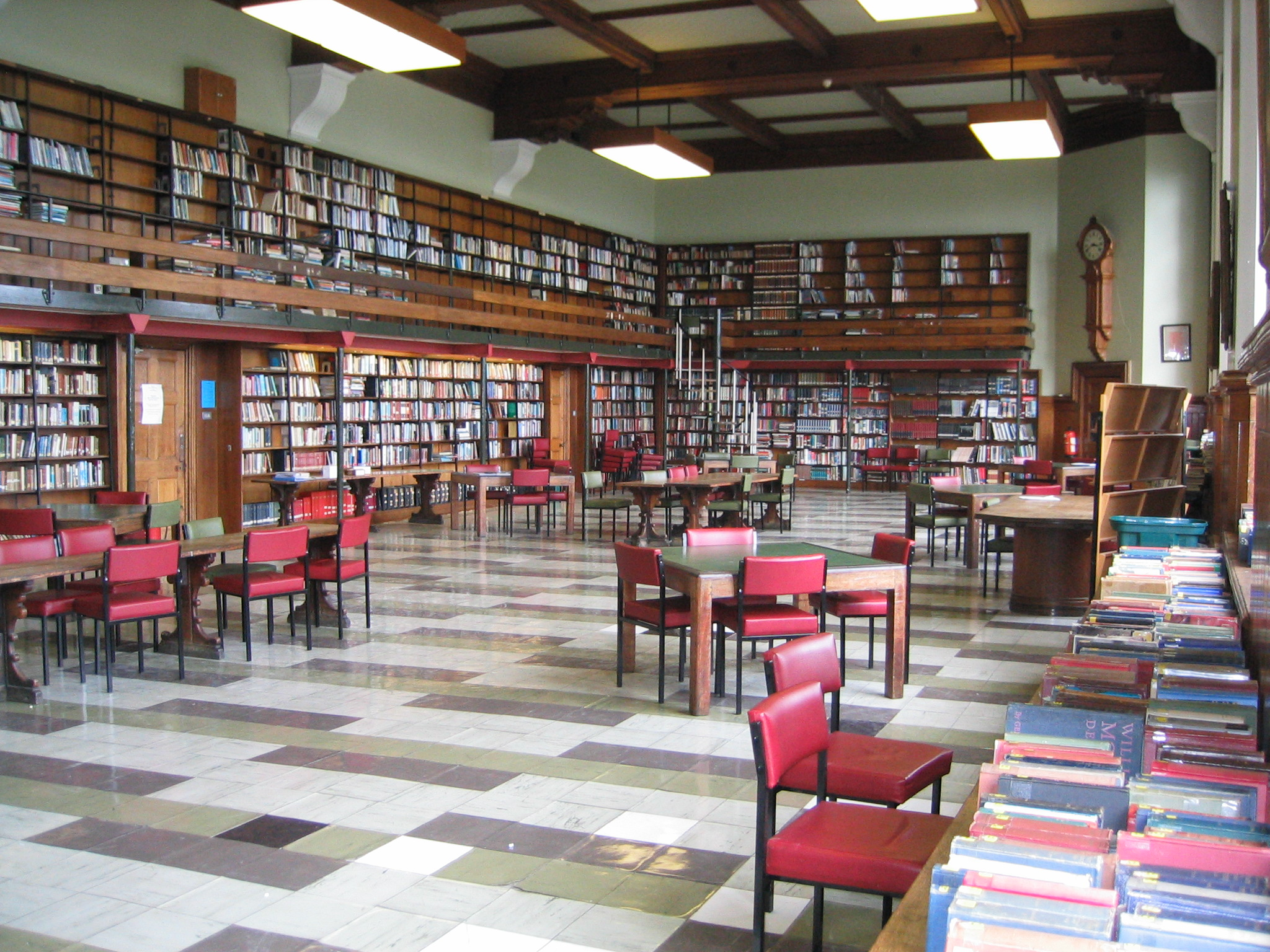
The More Library in 2003, prior to refurbishment.

Stonyhurst College has four main libraries: the Arundell, the Bay, the Square and the More (dedicated to Saint Thomas More).

The More Library is the main library for students while the 'House Libraries' (the Arundell, the Bay, and the Square) contain many artefacts from the Society of Jesus and English Catholicism. The Arundell Library, presented in 1837 by Everard, 11th Baron Arundell of Wardour, is the most significant; it is not only a country-house library from Wardour Castle but also has a notable collection of 250 incunabula, medieval manuscripts and volumes of Jacobite interest, signal among which is Mary Tudor's Book of Hours, which it is believed was given by Mary, Queen of Scots to her chaplain on the scaffold. The manuscript Le Livre de Seyntz Medicines was written in 1354 by Henry, Duke of Lancaster. To these were added the archives of the English Province of the Society of Jesus, which include 16th-century manuscript verses by St Robert Southwell SJ, the letters of St Edmund Campion SJ (1540–81) and holographs of the 19th-century poet Gerard Manley Hopkins. The Arundell Library has a copy of the Chronicles of Jean Froissart, captured at the Battle of Agincourt in 1415, and held the 7th-century Stonyhurst Gospel of St John before it was loaned to the British Library, as well as a First Folio of Shakespeare.

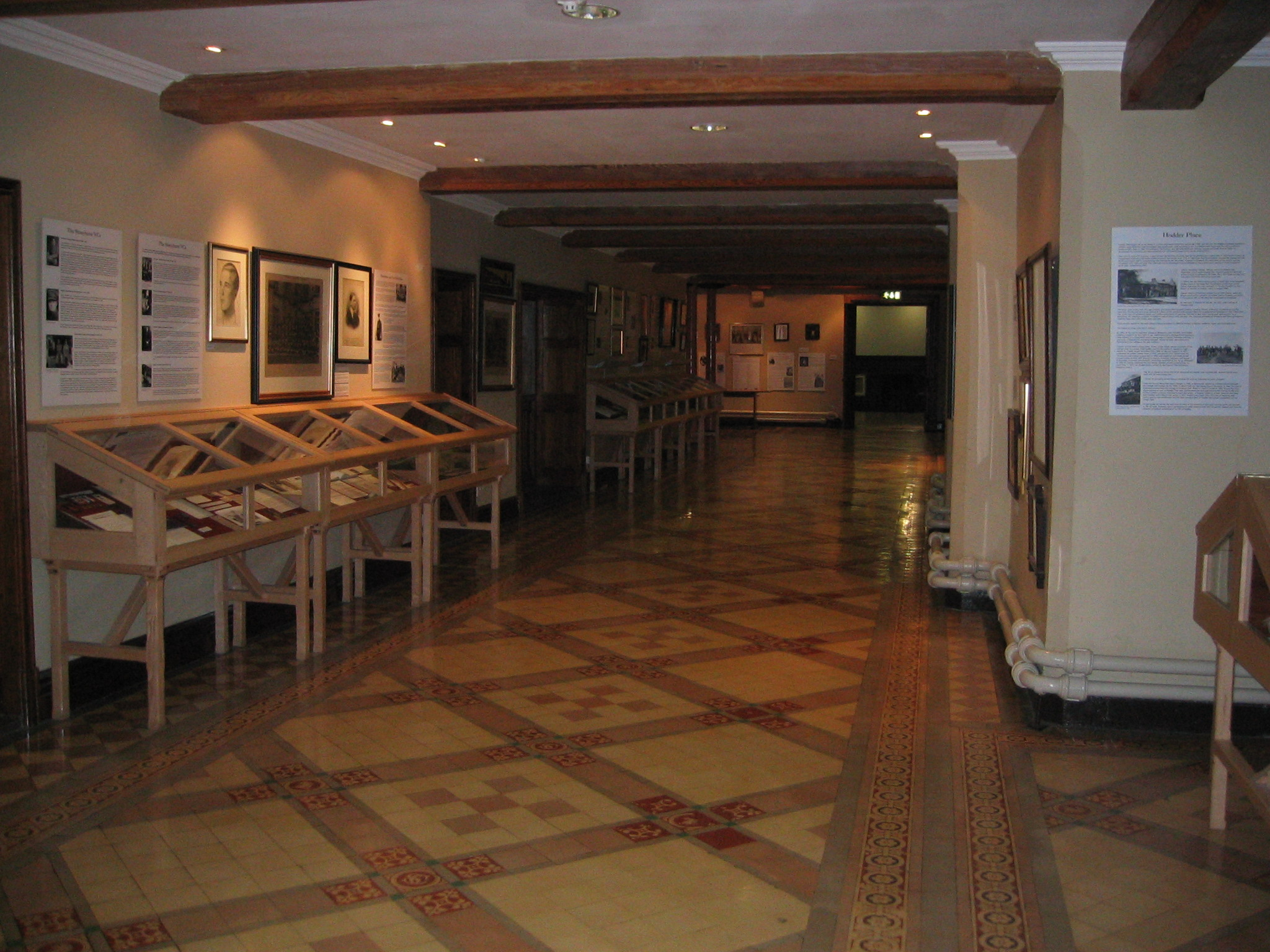
The Do Room, displaying items from the collections

Among those collections kept away from public view are numerous blood-soaked garments from Jesuits martyred in Japan, the skull of Cardinal Morton, ropes used to quarter St Edmund Campion SJ, hair of St Francis Xavier SJ, an enormous solid silver jewel-encrusted monstrance, the Wintour vestments, a cope made for Henry VII, and a thorn said to be from the crown of thorns placed upon Jesus' head at the crucifixion.

The school owns paintings, including a portrait of Tsar Nicholas I of Russia and another of the Jesuit Henry Garnet. In the Stuart Parlour are portraits of Jacobites including James Francis Edward Stuart, and his sons Charles Edward Stuart and Henry Benedict Stuart. There are also several original engravings by Rembrandt and Dürer, such as the 'Greater Passion' and the 'Car of Maximillian'.

== Observatory ==
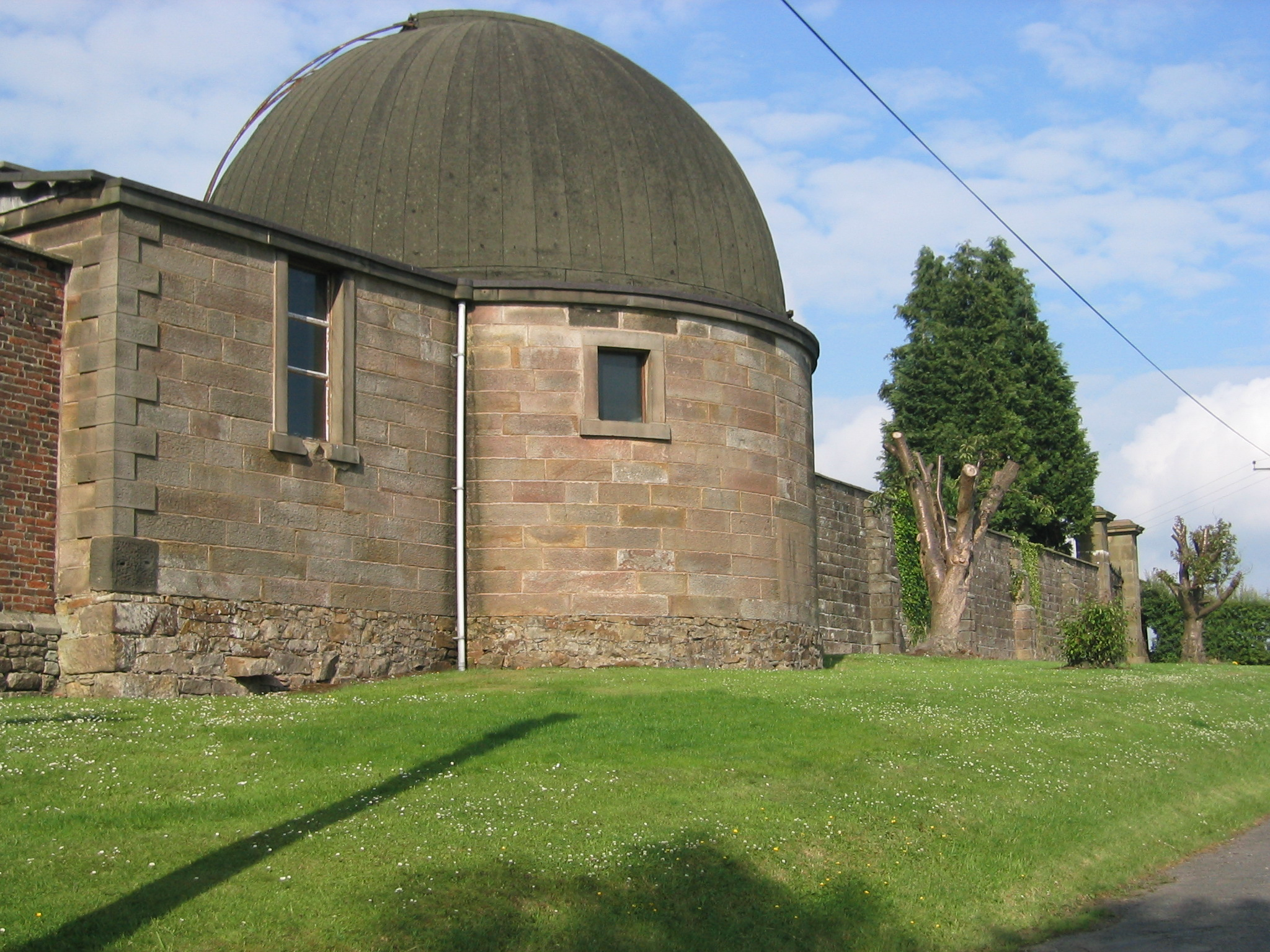
The rear of the Observatory

The school has a functioning observatory which was built in 1866. An older observatory, built in 1838, is now the Typographia Collegii, but was once one of seven important stations in the country when the Meteorological Office came under the auspices of the Royal Society. The records of temperature taken there start from 1846 and are the oldest continuous daily records in the world. During the nineteenth century, the observatory was maintained by the astronomer priests, Fr Alfred Weld, Fr Perry and Fr Sidgreaves whose research included astronomy, geomagnetrometry and seismology. Astrophysicist Pietro Angelo Secchi, director of the Vatican Observatory, also taught astronomy at the college during the period. Sir Edward Sabine chose the observatory as one of his main stations when conducting a magnetic survey of Britain in 1858. Five years later Fr Sidgreaves began the first series of monthly geometric observations, which continued until May 1919. During the course of the twentieth century, the observatory fell out of use and its telescope, parts of which dated to the 1860s, was sold after the Second World War. When its private owner came to sell it, the college was able to buy it back and restore it to its original home. The observatory is today used for astronomical purposes again, whilst also functioning as one of four weather stations used by the Met Office to provide central England temperature data (CET).

== Arts ==
=== Music, drama and art ===
There are two choirs: the Chapel Choir, which sings regularly at Mass, and the Schola Cantorum, composed of teachers and pupils, of all ages.

The school has two theatres and has after-school programs, lessons, and sessions in drama and music. In September 2024, a new dance studio was opened. The college has a traditional theatre, the Academy Room, and a high-tech theatre built at St Mary's Hall as part of the Centenaries Appeal in 1993. The latter plays host to the annual Ribble Valley International Piano Week. Several former pupils have gone on to achieve success upon the stage, including OSCAR-winning actor and director Charles Laughton and BAFTA-winning director and producer Peter Glenville.

There is a dedicated art studio in addition to a separate design and technology centre. Student artwork is displayed on the walls of the Lower Gallery, including a portrait of the Queen painted by Isobel Bidwell during the Golden Jubilee year; upon receipt of a copy, the Queen's lady-in-waiting said that "The Queen was delighted to see the painting and know that it is on display in the school".

=== Literary associations ===
Stonyhurst has provided inspiration for poets and authors who include former classics teacher Gerard Manley Hopkins, whose poems feature details of the local countryside, and former pupil Sir Arthur Conan Doyle whose "Baskerville Hall" was modelled on Stonyhurst Hall, and who named Sherlock Holmes' nemesis, Moriarty, after a fellow pupil. J. R. R. Tolkien wrote part of The Lord of the Rings in a classroom on the Upper Gallery during his stay at the college where his son taught Classics; his "Middle-earth" is said to resemble the local area, while there are specific resonances in names such as "Shire Lane", (the name of a road in Hurst Green) and the "River Shirebourn" (the Shireburns built Stonyhurst). Poet Laureate Alfred Austin, and the poet Oliver St John Gogarty ("Stately plump Buck Mulligan" in James Joyce's Ulysses) were educated at the school, (as were the sons of Oscar Wilde and Evelyn Waugh). George Archer-Shee, at the centre of Terence Rattigan's play The Winslow Boy, is an alumnus.

The school runs its own publication company, St Omer's Press, which publishes religious literature, and first began when the college was located at St Omer in Flanders.

== Sport ==
=== Rugby ===
Stonyhurst College Rugby Union Football Club (SCRUFC) has played a big part in the life of the school, despite only supplanting football as the school's primary sport in 1921. Sporting rivalry is particularly prominent against fellow Catholic independent schools Ampleforth College, Mount St Mary's College and Sedbergh School in Cumbria. The Stonyhurst Sevens take place annually.

The school has produced sixteen international rugby players (England (5), Ireland (6), Scotland (1) Italy (1), the USA (1) Bermuda (1) and the Bahamas (1)), as well as players for the Barbarians and the British and Irish Lions. Most recently they include Iain Balshaw and Kyran Bracken, who both played for England when they won the 2003 Rugby World Cup, whilst another member of that team, Will Greenwood, went to Stonyhurst Saint Mary's Hall, where his mother taught maths until 2007. Current pupils of the school have won places to represent Spain, Mexico (under 19s) the Irish Exiles and the Welsh Exiles (under 19s). Old boys have also played at varsity level and have won blues for Oxford or Cambridge.

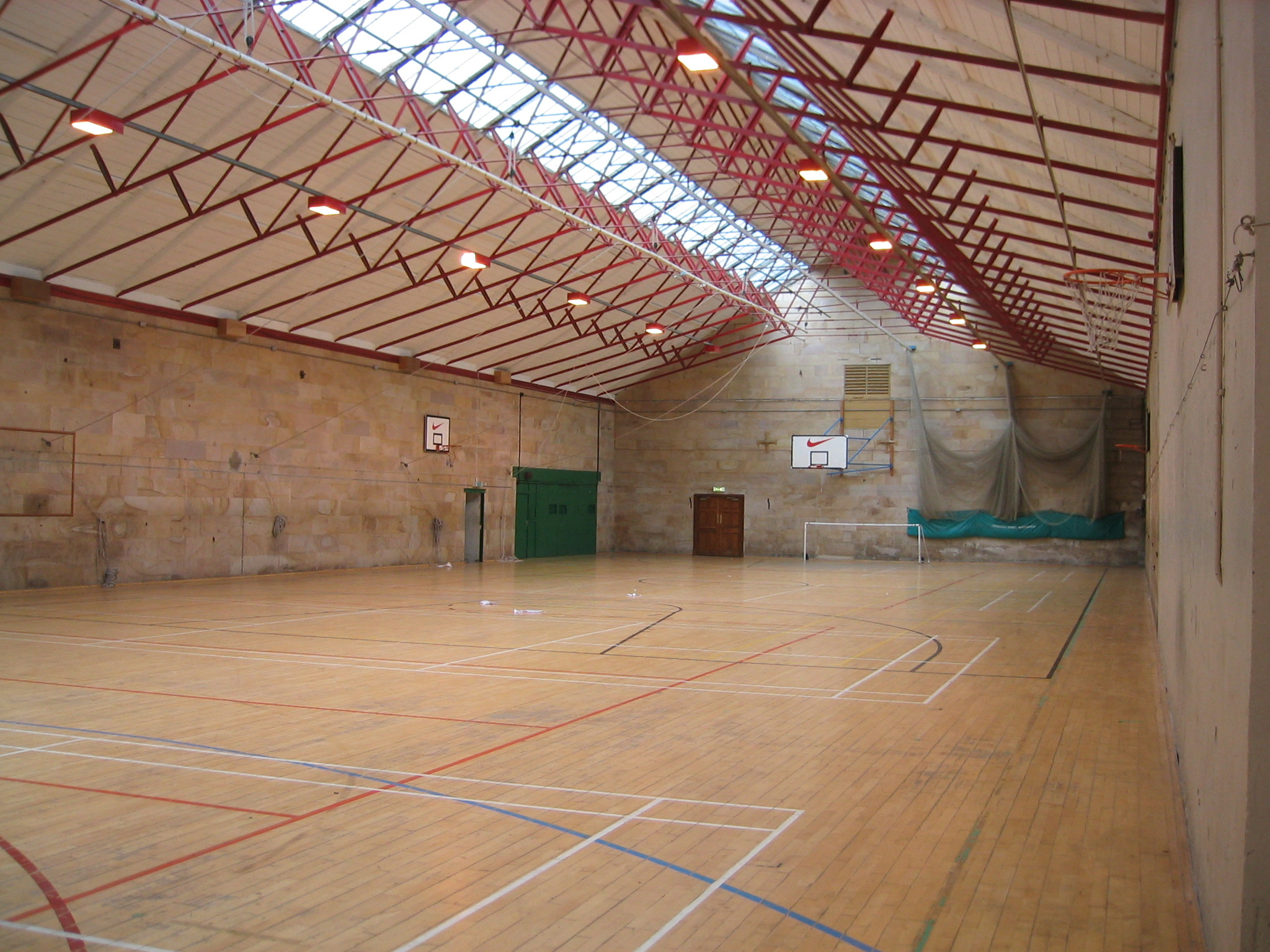
The Ambulacrum, used for sport, the CCF, and indoor marquee, one of the first structures of its kind in Britain, built in 1851.

Stonyhurst's coaches have included former England coaches Dick Greenwood and Brian Ashton who coached the first XV.

=== Stonyhurst Football ===
Stonyhurst Football, inherited from the College of St Omer (along with Stonyhurst Cricket), was a sport played between the handball walls on the Playground. The game was discontinued with the advent of association football but was re-established in 1988 when a "Grand Match" was played at Great Academies; traditionally a "Grand Match" was played on Shrove Tuesday and was the primary Stonyhurst Football match of the season. The teams were England v France (although during the Crimean War England v Russia was played and more recently England v Ireland was played in the 1980s). The last game took place in 1995.

== Military ==
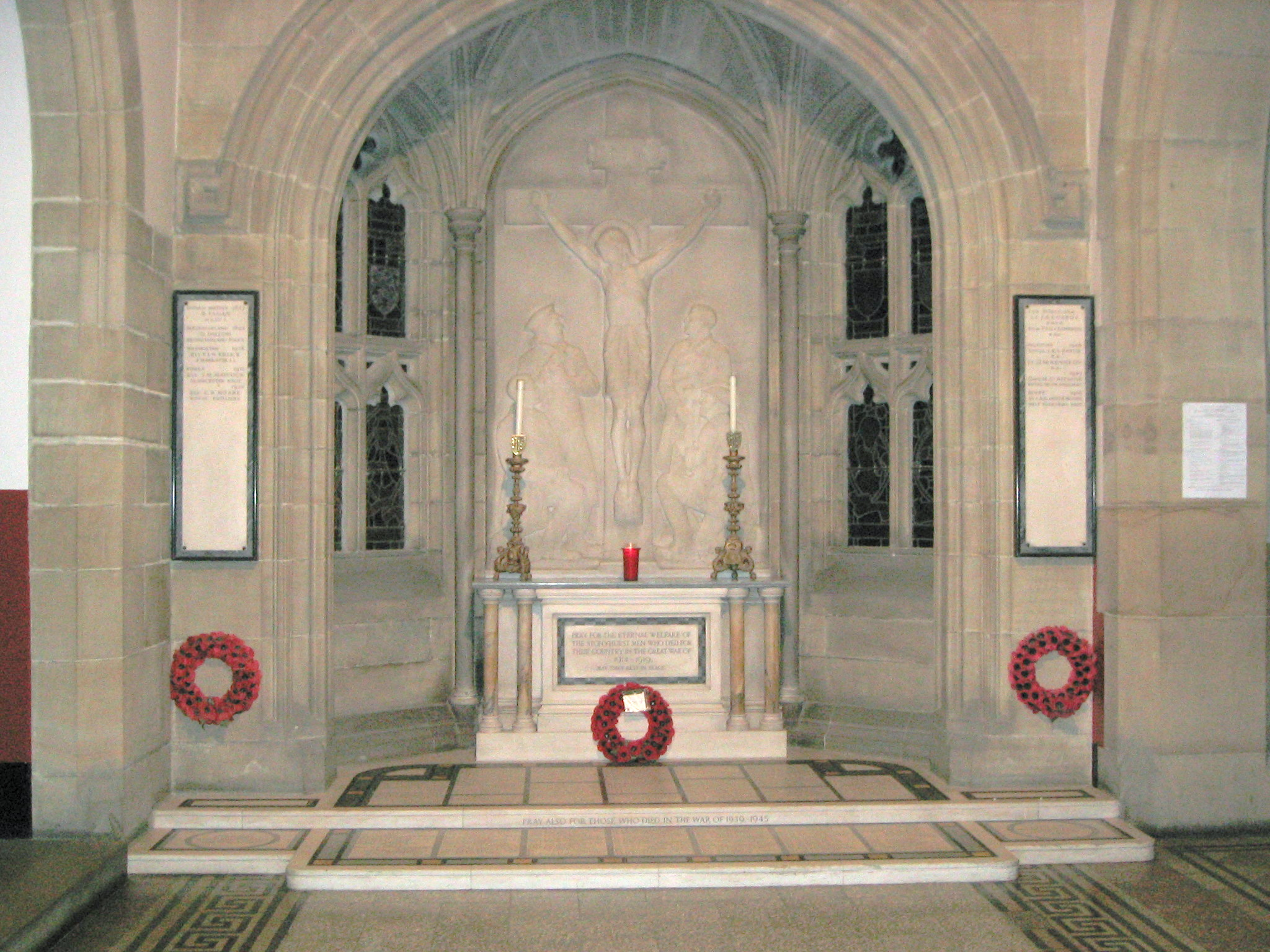
The war memorial, by Gilbert Ledward

=== Officer Training Corps (OTC) ===
The Stonyhurst Officer Training Corps assembled for the first time on 16 October 1900, in the Ambulacrum, overseen by The First Volunteer Battalion, the East Lancashire Regiment who gave instruction in drill and musketry. The Corps was granted the honour of representation at the Coronation of 1910 and sent members to the Royal Review at Windsor in 1911. It also appeared on parade annually for the spectacle of the Corpus Christi celebrations until the practice became obsolete after Vatican II.

=== Combined Cadet Corps (CCF) ===
After the Second World War, school OTCs were succeeded by the Combined Cadet Force. Stonyhurst's comprises the following platoons named after Stonyhurst's seven Victoria Cross winners:

==== Junior company ====
- Costello Platoon (Lieutenant Edmund William COSTELLO, Malakand, India 1897)
- Coury Platoon (Second Lieutenant George Gabriel COURY, Guillemont, Somme 1916)
- Liddell Platoon (Captain John Aiden LIDDELL, Ostend, Belgium 1915)
- Kenna Platoon (Captain Paul Aloysius KENNA, Khartoum, Sudan 1898)

==== Senior company ====
- Dease Platoon (Lieutenant Maurice James DEASE, Mons, Belgium 1914)
- Jackman Platoon (Captain James Joseph Bernard JACKMAN, Ed Duda, Tobruk, 1941)
- Andrews Platoon (Captain Harold Marcus ERVINE-ANDREWS, Dunkirk 1940)
- Support Platoon

=== Military careers ===
Some pupils have gone on to receive places at the Royal Military Academy Sandhurst. This follows a long tradition of service from Stonyhurst pupils: many Old Stonyhurst (O.S.) were killed in the two World Wars and are commemorated on the war memorial at the end of the Upper Gallery. The Stonyhurst War Records were published in their honour. A memorial at the top of the main staircase records the names of the six O.S. killed in the Boer War.

== School organisation ==
=== Playroom system ===
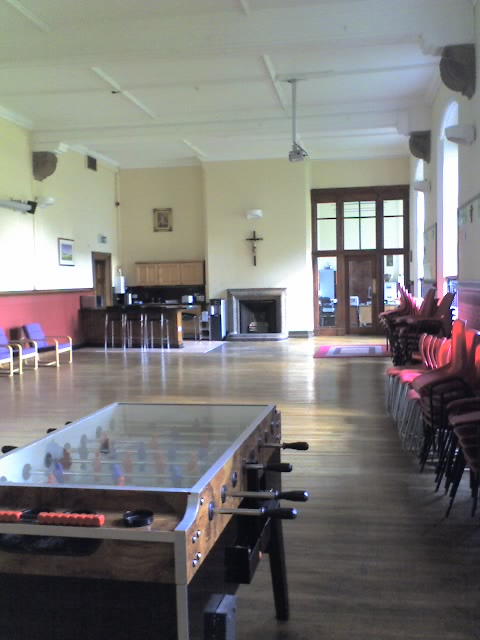
Lower Grammar Playroom in 2006

Unlike most English public schools, Stonyhurst is organised horizontally by year groups (known as playrooms) rather than vertically by houses, although the girls are also split into junior and senior houses.

=== Lines ===
In addition to the horizontal division of the school into playrooms, there is also a vertical grouping which cuts through the year groups, the "lines", and is used mostly for competitive purposes in sport and music. The lines and colours are as follows:

- Campion (red) (named after St Edmund Campion)
- St Omers (yellow, though brown for sporting attire) (named after St Omer, the town the school was founded in)
- Shireburn (green) (named after the Shireburn family which built Stonyhurst)
- Weld (blue) (named after Thomas Weld who donated Stonyhurst to the Jesuits)

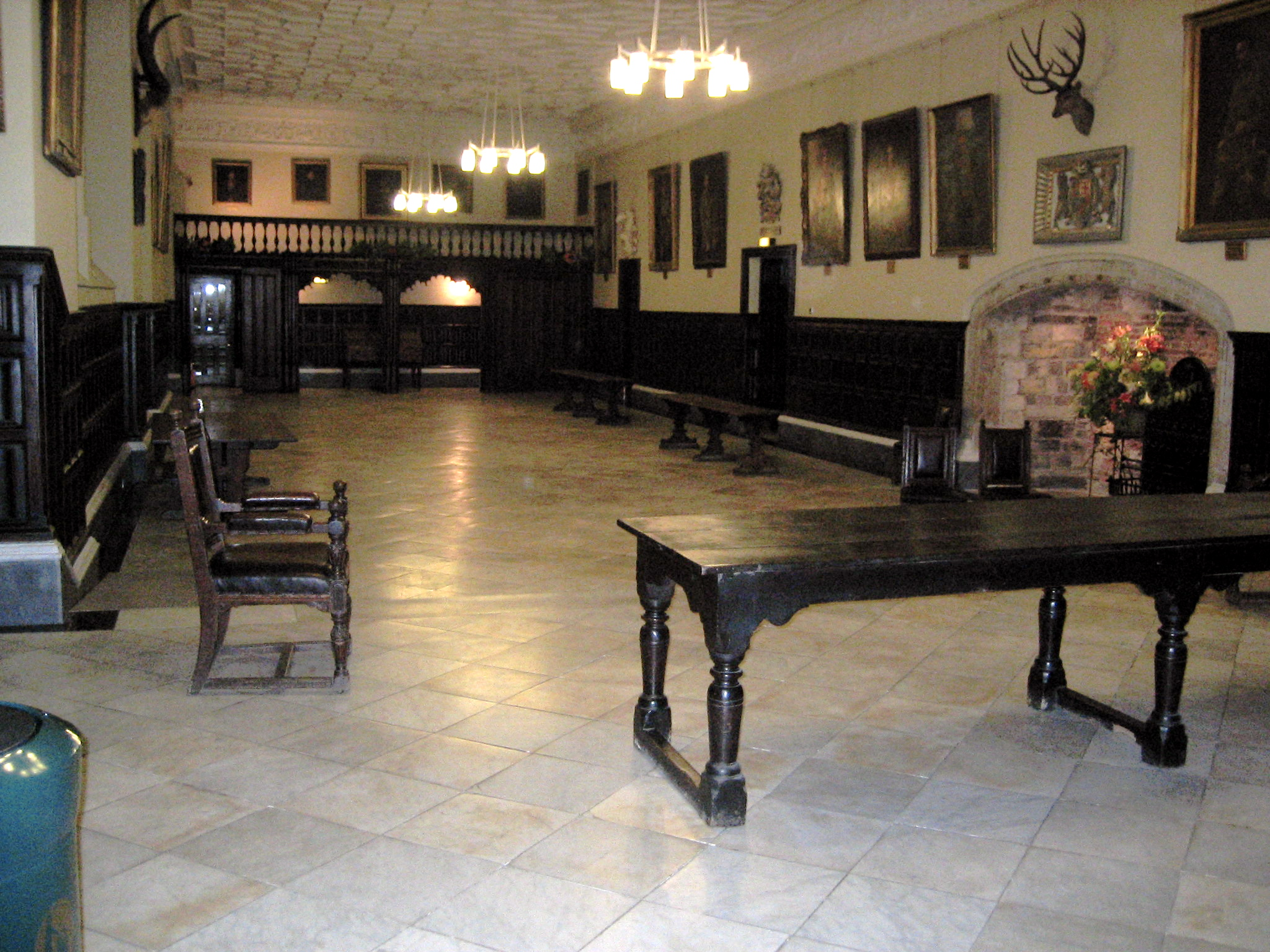
Top Refectory, today used for social functions

== Sister schools ==
Stonyhurst College has one sister school in Penang, Malaysia, called Stonyhurst International School Penang.

== Stonyhurst Association ==
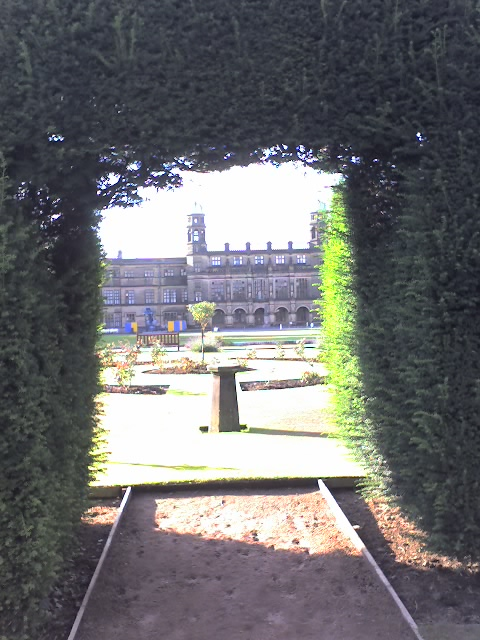
The South Front viewed from the gardens

After less formal arrangements had been made for many years, the Association was formed in 1879. In 1985, it was granted charitable status by the Charity Commission. Its primary objective is to foster a strong spirit of union among past pupils and friends of Stonyhurst, with a strong charitable emphasis.

=== Alumni ===
Stonyhurst has educated prominent individuals in many areas, from statesmen to sportsmen, and actors to archbishops. Seven alumni have been awarded the Victoria Cross, the highest award for gallantry; paintings of them adorn the walls of the Top Refectory in the school. The school's alumni include three saints, twelve Beati, seven archbishops, seven Victoria Cross winners, a Peruvian president, a Bolivian president, a New Zealand prime minister, a signatory of the American Declaration of Independence and several writers, sportsmen, and politicians.

Notable alumni include:

- Charles Carroll of Carrollton, signatory of the U.S. Declaration of Independence
- Arthur Conan Doyle, author of Sherlock Holmes
- St Thomas Garnet SJ, canonised saint and protomartyr of St Omers, one of the Forty Martyrs of England and Wales
- John Harbison, first State Pathologist of Ireland
- Joseph Mary Plunkett, Irish signatory of the Irish Proclamation of Independence leading activist in the Easter Rising, for which he was executed
- John Francis Moriarty, Attorney General for Ireland
- Richard More O'Ferrall, Governor of Malta and Irish landownder.
- Frederick Weld, New Zealand prime minister
- Eduardo Lopez de Romaña, president of Peru
- Lieutenant Maurice James Dease, was the first posthumous recipient of the Victoria Cross during WWI, fought and died at the Battle of Mons
- Thomas Meagher, Irish poet, leader of the Young Ireland movement, American Civil War Brigadier General, and Acting Governor of the Montana Territory.
- Daniel Carroll, brother of John and cousin of Charles, one of only five men to sign both the Articles of Confederation and the United States Constitution.
- John Carroll, brother of Daniel and cousin of Charles, served as first bishop and archbishop in the United States, founder of Georgetown University.

Contemporaries

- Joe Ansbro, Scottish rugby international
- Crispian Hollis, Bishop of Portsmouth
- Michael D. Hurley, Cambridge don engaged in literature, philosophy and theology
- Paul Johnson, writer, artist and popular historian
- Gabriel Leung, Dean of the Li Ka Shing Faculty of Medicine, University of Hong Kong
- Mark Thompson, former Director-General of the BBC
- Chris Morris, satirist, BAFTA winner
- Tom Morris, theatre director, producer and writer, and Tony Award winner
- Matt Greenhalgh, screenwriter, BAFTA winner
- Tim Hetherington, photographer, Oscar nominee
- Patrick Rock former government deputy director of policy for Prime Minister David Cameron and convicted sex offender*
- Bill Cash, MP for Stone, Staffordshire and prominent Brexiteer
- Patrick McGrath, novelist

== Notable masters ==
- Brian Ashton, history master and England rugby coach.
- Dick Greenwood, Assistant bursar and England rugby coach.
- Giovanni Antonio Grassi SJ (anglicized as John Anthony Grassi (1775 – 1849); Italian Jesuit who led many academic and religious institutions in Europe and the United States, including as 7th President of Georgetown University and the Pontificio Collegio Urbano de Propaganda Fide in Rome.
- Christopher Hollis (1925–1935), author, Member of Parliament; father of Bishop Crispian Hollis; brother of Sir Roger Hollis, Director of MI5; sometime President of the Oxford Union.
- Gerard Manley Hopkins, classics master and poet.
- Stephen Joseph Perry, astronomy master.
- Alfred Weld SJ, director of the Observatory, grandson of founder Thomas Weld (of Lulworth)
- Pietro Angelo Secchi, astronomy master, astrophysicist, and director of the Vatican Observatory.
- George Tyrrell, philosophy master and Roman Catholic modernist.

=== Headmasters ===
Since the college's foundation in Flanders in 1593, there have been 78 headmasters, (variably known as presidents, rectors, superiors and directors). Until the appointment of Giles Mercer in 1985, the headmaster had always been a member of the Society of Jesus.

St Omer, Bruges, Liège (1593–1794) See: Heads of St Omer, Bruges, Liège Stonyhurst (1794–present) Presidents Fr. Marmaduke Stone SJ (1794–1808) Fr. Nicholas Sewall SJ (1808–1813) Fr. John Weld SJ (1813–1816) Fr. Nicholas Sewall SJ (1816–1817) Rector and Headmaster Fr. Charles Plowden SJ (1817–1819) Fr. Joseph Tristram SJ (1819–1827) Fr. Richard Norris SJ (1827–1832) Fr. Richard Parker SJ (1832–1836) Fr. John Brownbill SJ (1836–1839) Fr. Francis Daniel SJ (1839–1841) Fr. Andrew Barrow SJ (1841–1845) Fr. Richard Norris SJ (1845–1846) Fr. Henry Walmesley SJ (1846–1847) Fr. Richard Sumner SJ (1847–1848) Fr. Francis Clough SJ (1848–1861) Fr. Joseph Johnson SJ (1861–1868) Fr. Charles Henry SJ (1868–1869) Fr. Edward Purbick SJ (1869–1879)	Fr. William Eyre SJ (1879–1885) Fr. Reginald Colley SJ (1885–1891) Fr. Herman Walmesley SJ (1891–1898) Fr. Joseph Browne SJ (1898–1906) Fr. Pedro Gordon SJ (1906–1907) Fr. William Bodkin SJ (1907–1916) Fr. Edward O'Connor SJ (1916–1924) Fr. Walter Weld SJ (1924–1929) Fr. Richard Worsley SJ (1929–1932) Fr. Edward O'Connor SJ (1932–1938) Fr. Leo Belton SJ (1938–1945) Fr. Bernard Swindells SJ (1945–1952) Fr. Francis Vavasour SJ (1952–1958) Fr. Desmond Boyle SJ (1958–1961) Headmasters Fr. Frederick J. Turner SJ (1961–1963) Fr. George Earle SJ (1963–1971) Fr. Michael Bossy SJ (1971–1985) Giles Mercer (1985–1996) Adrian Aylward (1996–2006) Andrew Johnson (2006-2016) John Browne (2016-2026) William Doherty (2026-present) Headmasters of Hodder Place & St Mary's Hall (1807–present) See: Headmasters of Stonyhurst Saint Mary's Hall

== Controversy ==
James Chaning-Pearce, a priest who taught at the school, was jailed for sexually assaulting pupils between 1987 and 1995. The youngest victim was a boy of 12. In 1999, the Lancashire Constabulary conducted "Operation Whiting", which looked into allegations of abuse at the school dating back to the 1970s. This resulted in two convictions, one of which was quashed on appeal. On 14 May 2002, in evidence to the House of Commons Home Affairs Committee, journalist David Rose described the operation as "a scandal in itself" and an "expensive... fiasco".

Another priest, Father Paul Symonds, at Stonyhurst between 1972 and 1979, was arrested in November 2009 for having allegedly abused a 13-year-old boy for three years. The case was dropped by the CPS Lancashire, a year later and was revealed in March 2014.

In 2014, Stonyhurst was fined £100,000 and ordered to pay £31,547.78 in legal costs for the prosecution after pleading guilty to a breach of the Health and Safety at Work etc. Act 1974 for health and safety failings after a stonemason working for the college developed silicosis, a potentially fatal lung disease. The college made the stonemason, who had worked for the college for almost 12 years, redundant, four months after his diagnosis.

== See also ==
- List of Jesuit sites in the United Kingdom
- List of Jesuit schools
- St Gordianus, interred in the school
- Listed buildings in Aighton, Bailey and Chaigley
