= Stonyhurst Saint Mary's Hall =

Stonyhurst St Mary's Hall Latin: Aula Sanctae Mariae

Location
- Clitheroe, Lancashire, England BB7 9PU; 53°50′53″N 2°28′02″W

Information
- Type: Private day and boarding
- Motto: Quant Je Puis (As much as I can)
- Religious affiliation: Roman Catholic (Jesuit)
- Established: 1807; 219 years ago (as Hodder Place); 1946 (as Saint Mary's Hall)
- Department for Education URN: 119825 Tables
- Headmaster: Christopher Cann
- Gender: Coeducational, since 1997
- Age: 3 to 11
- Enrollment: 137~
- Colours: Green, White
- Lines: Campion, St Omers, Shireburn, Weld
- Affiliated school: Stonyhurst College
- Diocese: Salford
- Patron saint: Blessed Virgin Mary
- Website: saintmaryshall.com

Stonyhurst St Mary's Hall (commonly known as S.M.H.) is the preparatory school to Stonyhurst College. It is an independent co-educational Catholic school, for ages 3–11, founded by the Society of Jesus (Jesuits). It is adjacent to Stonyhurst College, outside the small village of Hurst Green, near Clitheroe in Lancashire, England. It is primarily a day school but has some boarders. Its building was constructed in 1830 and it is a Grade II Iisted building. Close by was Hodder Place School (opened in 1807) and in 1970 the pupils were transferred from Hodder Place to St Mary's Hall, giving St Mary's a claim to be the oldest preparatory school in the country.

== History ==
=== Jesuit College ===
Stonyhurst College was founded in 1593 as the English Jesuit College at St Omers in present-day France, at a time when Catholic education was prohibited by law in England. Having moved to Bruges in 1762 and then Liège in 1773, due to the persecution of the Jesuit order which ran the school, it finally settled at Stonyhurst in 1794. An attempt had been made to found a preparatory school to the college at St Omers, which would have been based in Boulogne, but this was abandoned and ultimately ended by the expulsion of the Jesuits from France in 1762. In 1768 new buildings were erected for a preparatory school at Bruges; this 'Little College' was closed in 1775, two years after the migration of the college to Liège. Thirteen years after the settlement in England, the preparatory school was established in 1807.

=== Hodder Place ===
The Stonyhurst Estate donated by an old boy of the college at St Omers, Thomas Weld, included the Shireburn family Hall and a large building on the edge of the River Hodder, Hodder Place. The latter opened as a Jesuit novitiate when the Jesuits were formally re-established in Britain in 1803. Four years later, in 1807, preparatory schooling started when the youngest pupils in the school, which had settled in the Hall, were transferred to Hodder Place. It was not until 1855, however, that the preparatory school was formally opened. The building underwent extension in 1836 and again in 1869 when two towers were constructed on either side. Hodder Place continued to function as the preparatory school to the college until 1970 when it was shut and converted into residential flats.

=== St Mary's Hall ===
Between 1828 and 1830, a new building in Georgian style was constructed closer to the college and opened as the new novitiate, St Mary's Hall. In the nineteenth century, the poet Gerard Manley Hopkins trained as a priest there, and in the twentieth century John Tolkien, son of J.R.R. Tolkien, also trained there.

The building was extended with two symmetrical wings on either side in the 1850s when the symmetry of the college's south front was also finally completed.

St Mary's Hall continued to function as a formation centre for Jesuits until 1926 when they were moved to Heythrop Hall in Oxfordshire. During World War Two, the building lay derelict until the English College moved in for the war's duration. After their return to Rome, the Figures Playroom (ages 11 to 12) was transferred from the college to St Mary's Hall, which opened as a middle school to Stonyhurst in 1946. When Hodder Place was closed in 1970, the pupils were moved across to St Mary's Hall to form the Hodder Playroom. As successor to Hodder Place, the school has a claim to be the oldest surviving preparatory school in Britain.

In the 1980s, a fire destroyed much of the building's wooden panelling. In 1993, as part of the Stonyhurst Centenaries, celebrating the four-hundredth anniversary of the school's founding and the two-hundredth anniversary of its settlement at Stonyhurst the year later, the Centenaries Theatre was built. In 1997, the transition to becoming a fully co-educational school started. In 2004, with the opening of Hodder House, the pre-school for 3-year-olds, was created.

Until 2007, the school was officially known as "St Mary's Hall, Stonyhurst". That year, the school officially became known as "Stonyhurst St Mary's Hall".

In September 2024, the education of pupils aged 11 to 13 was transferred from St Mary's Hall to Stonyhurst College.

== Religious life ==
St Mary's Hall is a Catholic school, overseen by the Jesuits. As such, the Jesuit ethos pervades the life of the school, with emphasis upon spiritual development, reasoning skills, and the creation of "Men and Women for Others", with focuses on prayer and charity.

St Mary's Hall has its own chapel where Mass is celebrated.

As at the college, pupils write AMDG in the top, left-hand corner of any piece of work they do. It stands for the Latin phrase Ad Majorem Dei Gloriam which means "To the Greater Glory of God". At the end of a piece of work they write L.D.S. in the centre of the page. It stands for Laus Deo Semper which means "Praise be to God Always". These are both traditional Jesuit mottoes.

== School organisation ==
=== The playroom system ===
Unlike most English public schools, Stonyhurst is organised horizontally by year groups (known as playrooms) rather than vertically by houses.

=== Lines ===
In addition to the playrooms, there is also a system which cuts through the year groups, the "Lines", which are used mostly for sports and competitions. The Lines and colours are as follows:

- Campion (Red) (after St Edmund Campion)
- St Omers (Yellow, though some brown rugby shirts as yellow shows too much dirt) (after St Omer, the French town where the school was founded)
- Shireburn (Green) (after the Shireburn family that built Stonyhurst Hall)
- Weld (Blue) (after the Weld family that donated Stonyhurst)

Pupils remain in the same Line throughout their time at the school, and if their parents, older siblings, or grandparents etc. were also pupils, automatically enter the same Line.

== Academic ==
In Rudiments, pupils sit the Common Entrance and/or the 11+ Scholarship examinations in preparation for entry to the college. The Common Entrance examinations were only a recent addition to the school. Before that, pupils leaving St Mary's Hall took the Stonyhurst entrance exams, which were internally set.

== Notable Alumni ==
- George Archer-Shee, (Hodder Place alumnus), cause célèbre, his case was the inspiration for the play The Winslow Boy by Terence Rattigan.
- Patrick Baladi, actor.
- Iain Balshaw, rugby player and Rugby World Cup winner.
- Sir Arthur Conan Doyle (Hodder Place alumnus), author of Sherlock Holmes.
- Will Greenwood, rugby player (whose mother taught mathematics at the school until 2007).
- Vyvyan Holland (Hodder Place alumnus), author, translator, and son of Oscar Wilde.

== Headmasters ==
=== Hodder Place ===
Superiors

- Fr. George Lambert SJ (1856-1857)
- Fr. George Tickell SJ (1857-1858)
- Fr. John Laurenson SJ (1858-1865)
- Fr. Francis Brownbill SJ (1865-1869)
- Fr. Matthew Newsham SJ (1869-1875)
- Fr Walter Bridge SJ (1875-1876)
- Fr. Francis Cassidy SJ (1876-1878)
- Fr. William Kerr SJ (1878-1880)
- Fr. Francis Scholes SJ (1880-1882)
- Fr. William Burns SJ (1882-1884)
- Fr. Charles Clarke SJ (1884-1885)
- Fr. Francis Cassidy SJ (1885)

- Fr. Edward King SJ (1916)
- Fr. Walter Weld SJ (1916-1925)
- Fr. Aloysius Parkinson SJ (1925-1927)
- Fr. Leo Belton SJ (1927-1939)
- Fr. Hubert McEvoy SJ (1939-1942)
- Fr. Walter Weld SJ (1942-1949)

Ministers

- Fr. Oswald Fishwick SJ (1949-1959)
- Fr. John Firth SJ (1959-1965)

Headmasters

- Denis Unsworth (1965-1968)
- Mr. Earle (1968-1970)
- Rob Sinclair (1970-1971)
- John Mallinson (1971)

=== St Mary's Hall ===
Ministers

- Fr. Dermot Whyte SJ (1946-1948)
- Fr. Philip Prime SJ (1948-1954)
- Fr. William Maher SJ (1954-1959)
- Fr. Anthony Powell SJ (1959-1965)

Headmasters

- R Vaughan Rigby OS (1965-1968)
- Rae Carter (1968-1978)
- Peter Anwyl (1978-1990)
- Rory O'Brien (1990-1999)
- Michael Higgins (1999-2004)
- Laurence Crouch (2004-2014)
- Ian Murphy (2014-2022)
- Fr. Christopher Cann (2022-)

== Exterior ==
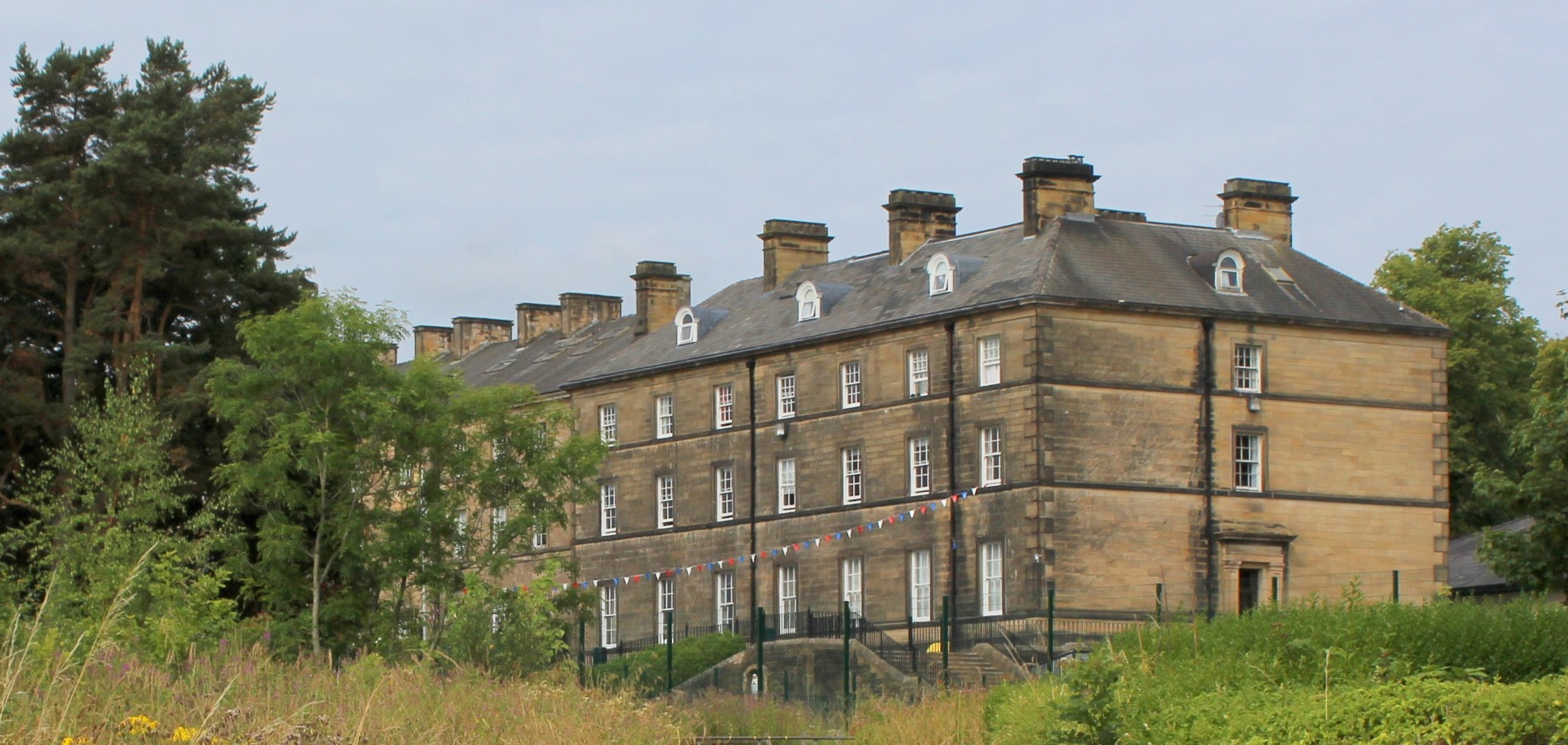
School building in 2018

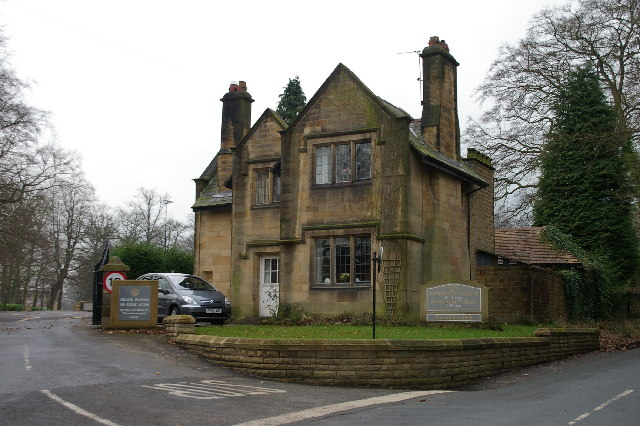
Entrance lodge to school

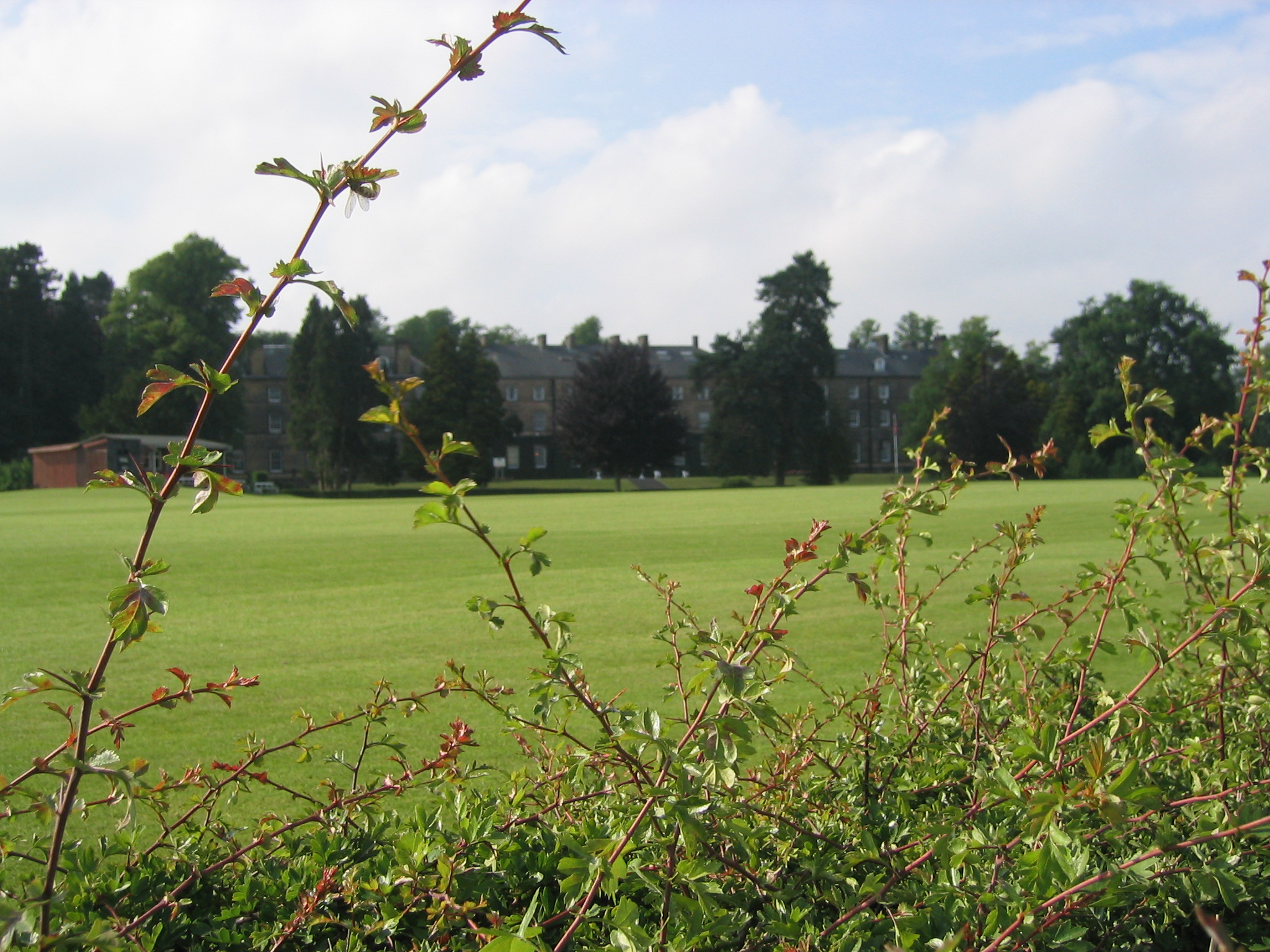
The school from across the sports pitches

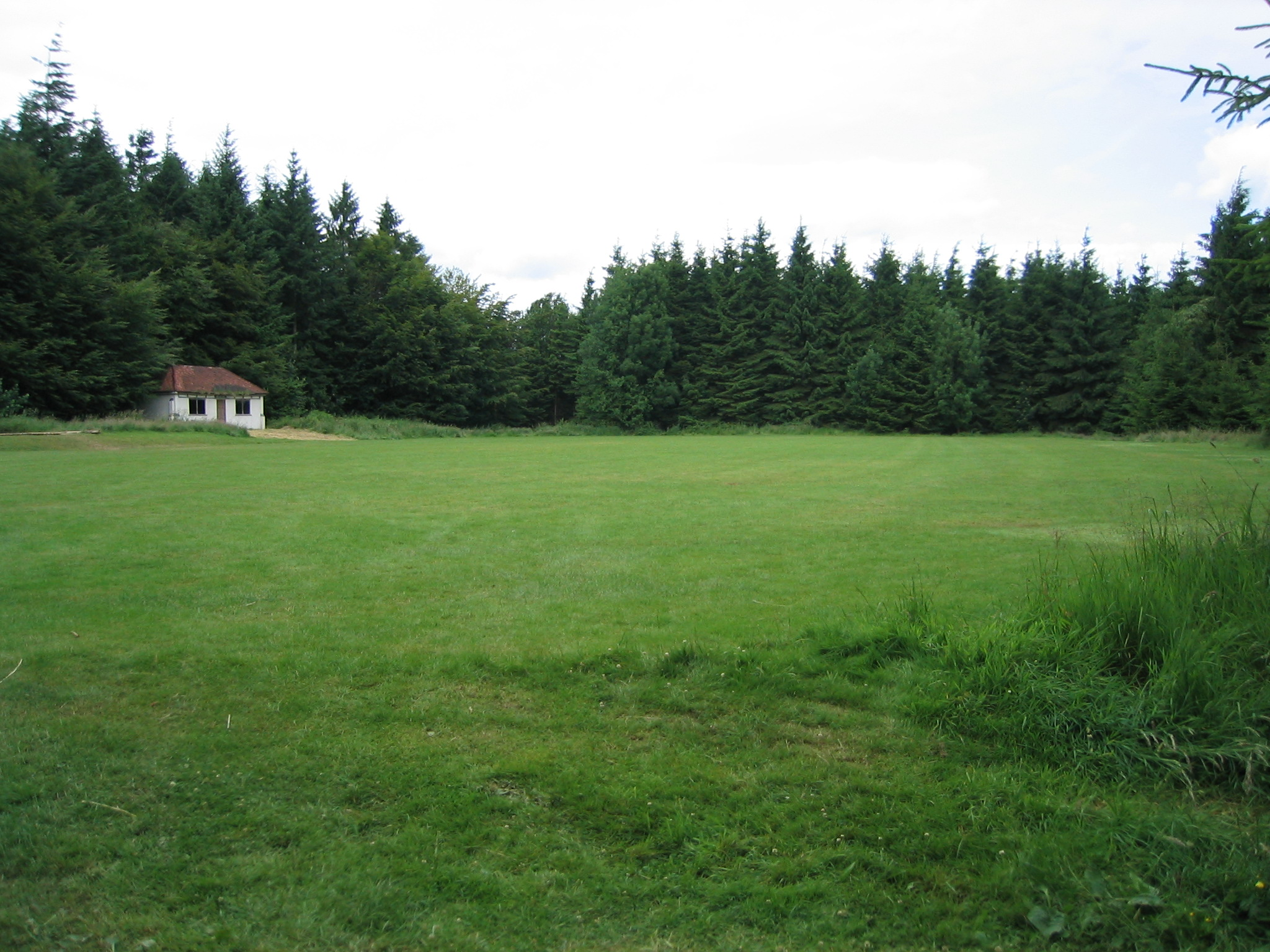
The sports pitch at Hodder Place, 2003

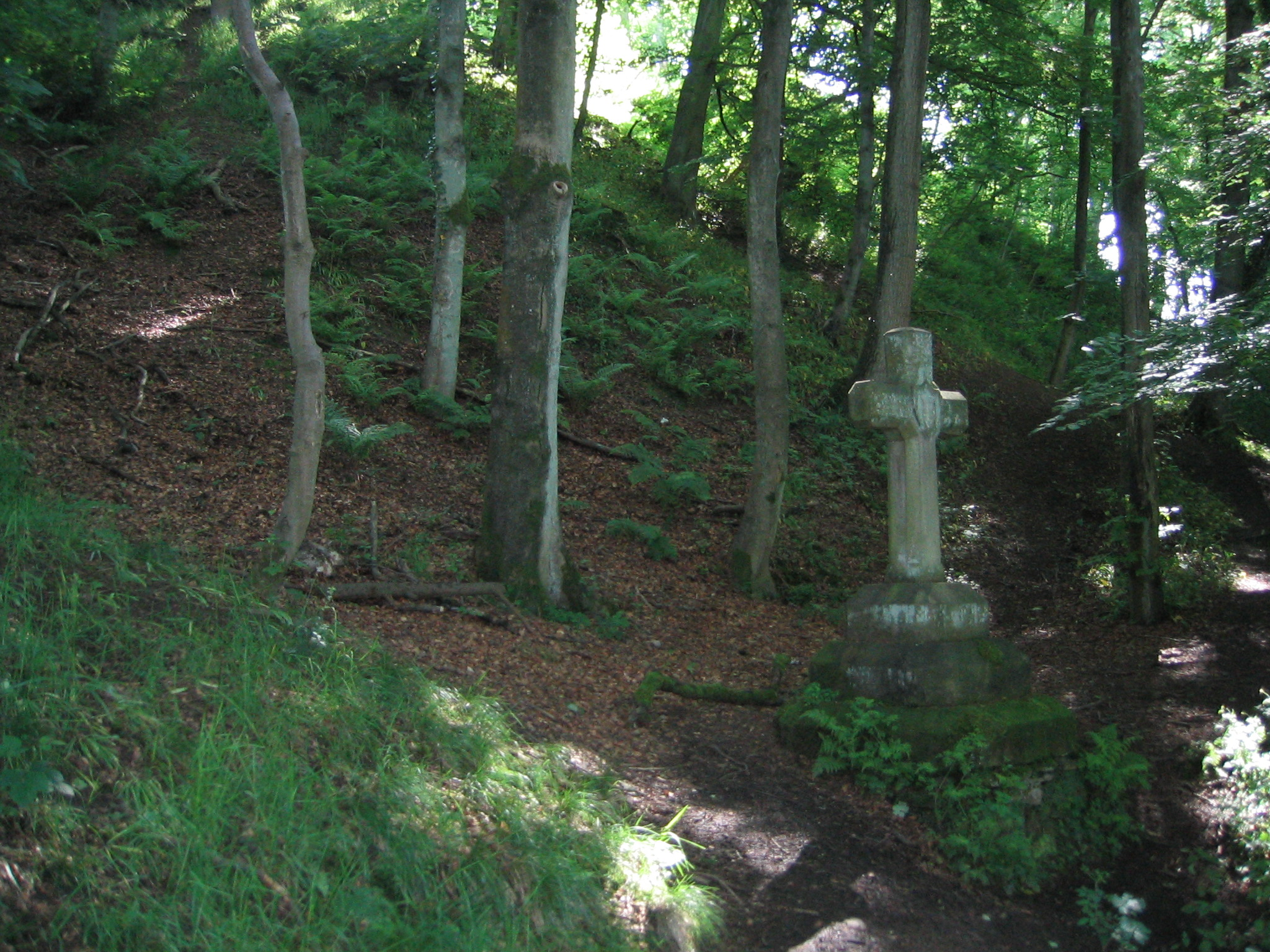
Stonyhurst Park Cross

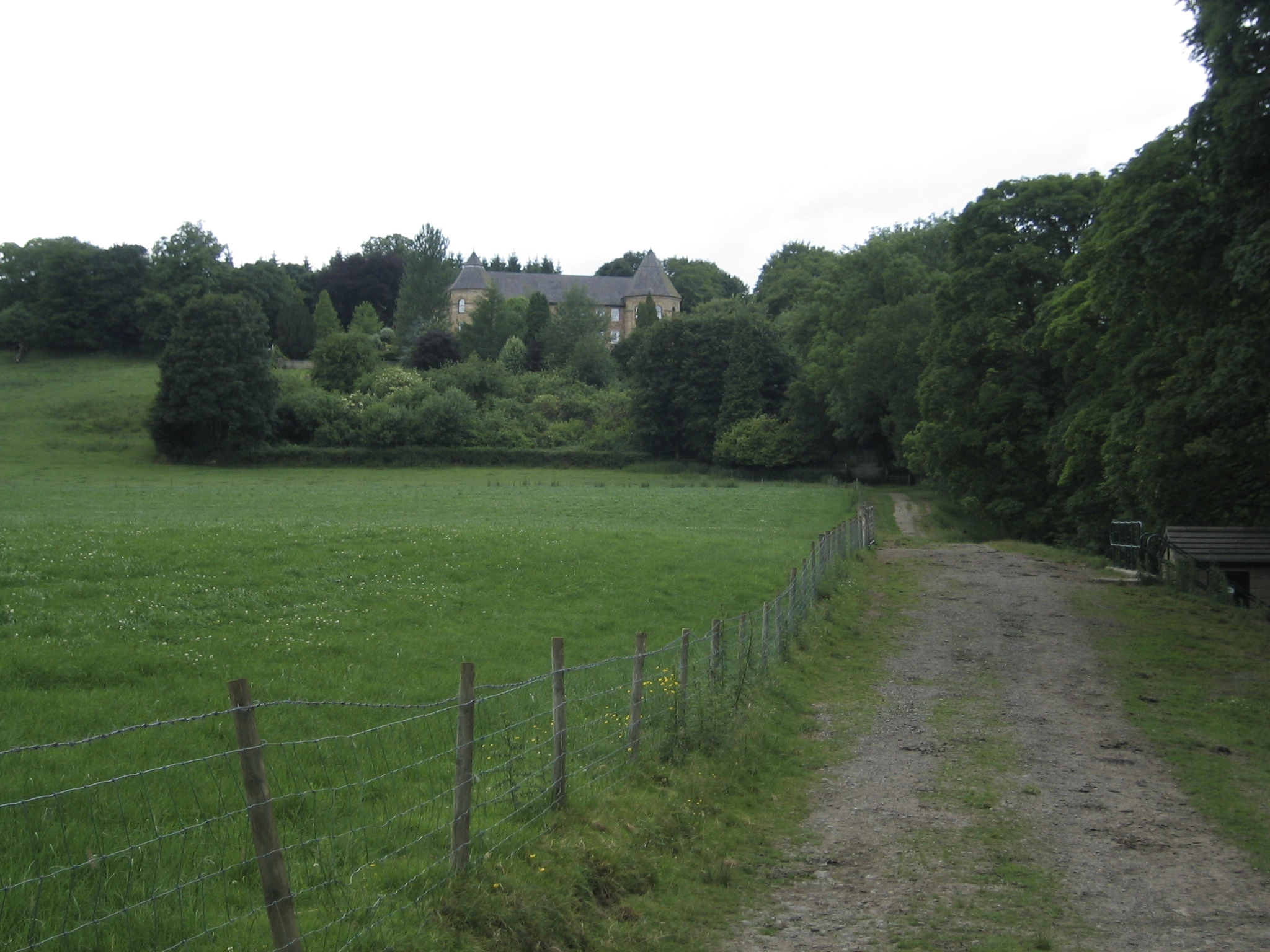
Hodder Place, former Jesuit novitiate and preparatory school

== See also ==
- Stonyhurst Estate
- College of St. Omer
- List of Stonyhurst Alumni/ae
- Charities of Stonyhurst College
- St Ignatius, founder of the Jesuits
- List of Jesuit sites in the United Kingdom
- List of Jesuit schools
