= Eugène Lafont =

Belgian Jesuit missionary and scientist

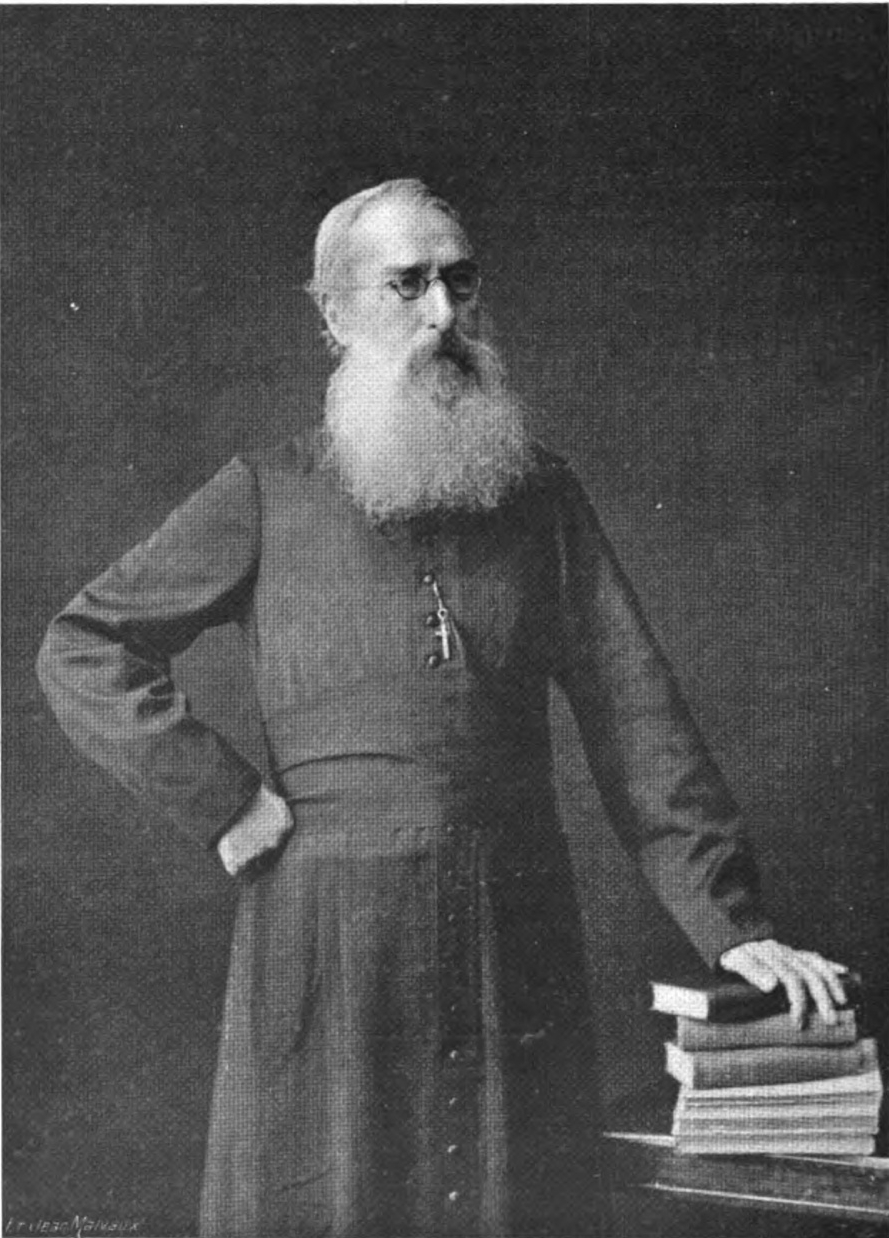
Father Lafont

Eugène Lafont, S.J. (26 March 1837 in Mons, Hainaut, Belgium – 10 May 1908 in Darjeeling, British India), was a Belgian Jesuit priest, who became a missionary in India, where he became a noted scientist and the founder of the first Scientific Society in India.

== Formation and early years ==
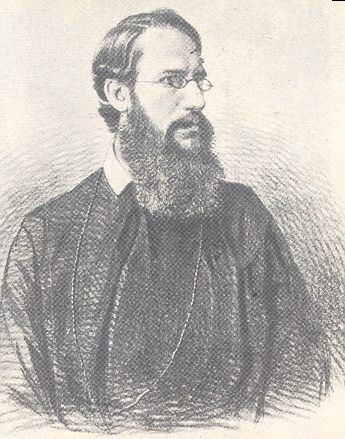
A drawing of Father Lafont as a young man

He was born in Mons, where his father, Pierre Lafont, a military officer, was stationed. After secondary studies in the Jesuit Collège de Sainte-Barbe in his town, in 1854 Lafont was received into the novitiate of the Society of Jesus, located in the former Norbertine Abbey of Tronchiennes in Ghent. He then went through the usual Jesuit formation, spending his period of Regency teaching in Jesuit schools in Ghent (1857–59) and Liège (1862–63), followed by his studying to obtain degrees in both philosophy in Tournai and the natural sciences in Namur (1863–65). In Namur he showed a particular aptitude for physical experimentation.

== Service in India ==
=== St. Xavier's College ===
In 1859 the Superior General of the Society of Jesus entrusted the opening of a college for the native Catholics of West Bengal to the Jesuit Province of Belgium. The superior of the Jesuit community at Namur, Henri Depelchin, S.J., was sent to India by as the head of a group of Jesuits who were charged with this task. St. Xavier's College, Calcutta, was opened for classes in January 1860. Aware of Lafont's talent in the field of science, Delpelchin requested that he be assigned to the mission. In 1865 Lafont left for India where he arrived, in Calcutta on 4 December of that year.

Soon after arriving in the capital city of British India, Lafont was appointed to teach science. The school was barely 5 years old and everything had to be done. Since he could not teach science without practical experiments, however, he promptly installed a laboratory in the college—the first such science laboratory of modern India. In November 1867, he made headlines in the local press thanks to a makeshift observatory set on the roof of the college. He recorded daily meteorological observations which allowed him to anticipate with much accuracy the arrival of a devastating cyclone. The government authorities were informed and took immediate measures that prevented the loss of many lives. From that day forward, meteorological forecasts by Lafont were regularly published in the major weekly newspaper of Calcutta, the Indo-European Correspondence.

=== Scientific lectures ===
By 1870 Lafont was at ease in the English language and began to give scientific lectures for the general public, in which he demonstrated that he had a particular gift in popularizing scientific knowledge. All the new scientific discoveries and inventions of the second half of the 19th century were thus made known, always with empirical evidence. So was it of the magic lantern, the telephone, phonograph, X-rays, photography, etc. Through contacts the science enthusiast had brought from Europe the most modern scientific tools, such as the meteorograph of Angelo Secchi (meteorology remained his favourite field of activity). The lectures had a huge success and came to an end only with Lafont's retiring to Darjeeling, a few months before his death in 1908.

In 1873 Lafont was named the Rector of St. Xavier's College. The next year, a high level international scientific expedition visited Calcutta on its way to the nearby town of Midnapore in order to observe a very rare astronomical phenomenon: the passage of planet Venus before the sun. Lafont joined the group. His observations made him known internationally and the following year he easily obtained the financial help needed in order to build an astronomical observatory on the school grounds, equipped with the most modern telescope.

=== Indian Association for the Cultivation of Science ===
With the financial support of philanthropist Mahendralal Sarkar, whose friend he was since 1869, Lafont founded in 1876 the Indian Association for the Cultivation of Science. The first aim of the association was to disseminate scientific knowledge and keep the general public abreast with the latest scientific progresses. From its early days the Thursday evening lectures given by Lafont were one of the association's main activities. Later it developed into a center of research which supported, among others, the spectrographic investigations of C.V. Raman (1930 winner of the Nobel Prize in Physics) and of K.S. Krishnan.

Jagadish Chandra Bose (1858–1937) was another student, and later friend, of Lafont. When Bose discovered the 'wireless telegraphy' (at the source of radiophonic inventions) it is Lafont who made in Calcutta (1897) a public demonstration of this discovery. For Lafont there was no doubt that Bose had preceded the Italian Guglielmo Marconi in this discovery. He never failed to give due credit to his former student.

In fact Lafont was more of an educator than a research scholar or inventor. His competence and varied activities gave him a place in the University of Calcutta, of which he was a Senate member for many years. Thanks to him the importance of the study of science in the university was acknowledged: he prepared the science syllabus and in 1903 obtained from the Indian Universities Commission more substantial means for the setting up of laboratories and the improvement of the science courses. In 1908, a few months before his death, he received a Doctorate in Sciences Honoris Causa from the University of Calcutta.

== Evaluation ==
Lafont was a science enthusiast. He was also religious. As the Catholic Church at that time had a very negative image in the world of science, Lafont gave an account of himself to scientists who expressed surprise. "Though Catholic and priest, I may well tell you that I receive with profound joy, and even love, every progress made in science." He believed there were dangers of the widespread ‘scientism' of his times and what he said when radium was discovered may well be premonitory: "These discoveries must make us cautious. We shouldn't easily believe that we are in possession of a final certainty in what concerns Matter and the forces of nature in general. It is noble and wonderful to say: 'I do not know'."

== Bibliography ==
- Arun Kumar Biswas (2001). Father Eugene Lafont of St. Xavier's College, Kolkata and the Contemporary Science Movement. Asiatic Society. ISBN 978-81-7236-104-4.
- Udayan Namboodiry (1995). St. Xavier's, the making of a Calcutta institution. Viking. ISBN 9780670861767.
- Achille Verstraeten: A Jesuit physicist and Astronomer, in Jesuit profiles, Anand, 1991.

== See also ==
- List of Jesuit scientists
- List of Roman Catholic scientist-clerics
