= Alfred Weld =

English Jesuit and astronomer

- Born: 1823; Leagram, Lancashire
- Died: 1890 (aged 66–67); South Africa
- Resting place: Makhanda, Eastern Cape
- Known for: Contributions to Astronomy, the management of the Society of Jesus
- Scientific career
- Fields: Astronomy, Theology
- Workplaces: Stonyhurst College, Society of Jesus, Zambesi Mission

Alfred Weld S. J. (1823 Leagram, Lancashire – 1890 South Africa) was an English Jesuit priest, professor of Science and Director of Stonyhurst Observatory. While working at the observatory, he welcomed in 1848 the Italian refugee Jesuit, Angelo Secchi, who went on to be a pioneer in Astronomy. Weld was ordained in 1854. After briefly managing St Marys Hall in Lancashire, he became Novice Master at Manresa House, Roehampton. During this period, in 1862, he was the founding editor of the Jesuits' in-house magazine, Letters and Notices (still circulating in the new Millennium) and ensured The Month (a Catholic review) was edited by the Society. It was his desire to foster a community of writers. The anonymous author of his obituary in Letters and Notices, wrote: "It is no exaggeration then to say that the literary work of the Province, so promising, so prolific, and so fruitful of good which has marked the last thirty years, is in great measure due to the initiatif and large-minded encouragement of Father Weld." It was during Weld's time at the helm that the poet Gerard Manley Hopkins was welcomed into the Society.

Weld was rapidly elected Provincial of the English Province in 1864. In 1871 he became Rector of St Beuno's Theological College in Wales. Two years later in 1873 he became English Assistant to the Jesuit General, Peter Jan Beckx. He spent the last three years of his life with the Zambesi Mission, having first directed operations from Rome and then going out himself to replace Henri Depelchin SJ to rescue the failed settlement, carry on missionary work and manage St Aidan's College in Grahamstown, (now Makhanda, Eastern Cape).

Alfred Weld was born into an old English recusant family, son of Mary Searle and George, eighth son of Thomas Weld (of Lulworth) and Mary Stanley-Massey-Stanley. His paternal grandfather was the benefactor and founder of the Jesuit Stonyhurst College. Cardinal Weld was his uncle.

== Distinctions ==
- Fellow of the Royal Astronomical Society

== Publications ==
His publications include:

- The Suppression of the Society of Jesus in the Portuguese Dominions, London, 1877
