= Rimae Secchi =

System of rilles on the Moon

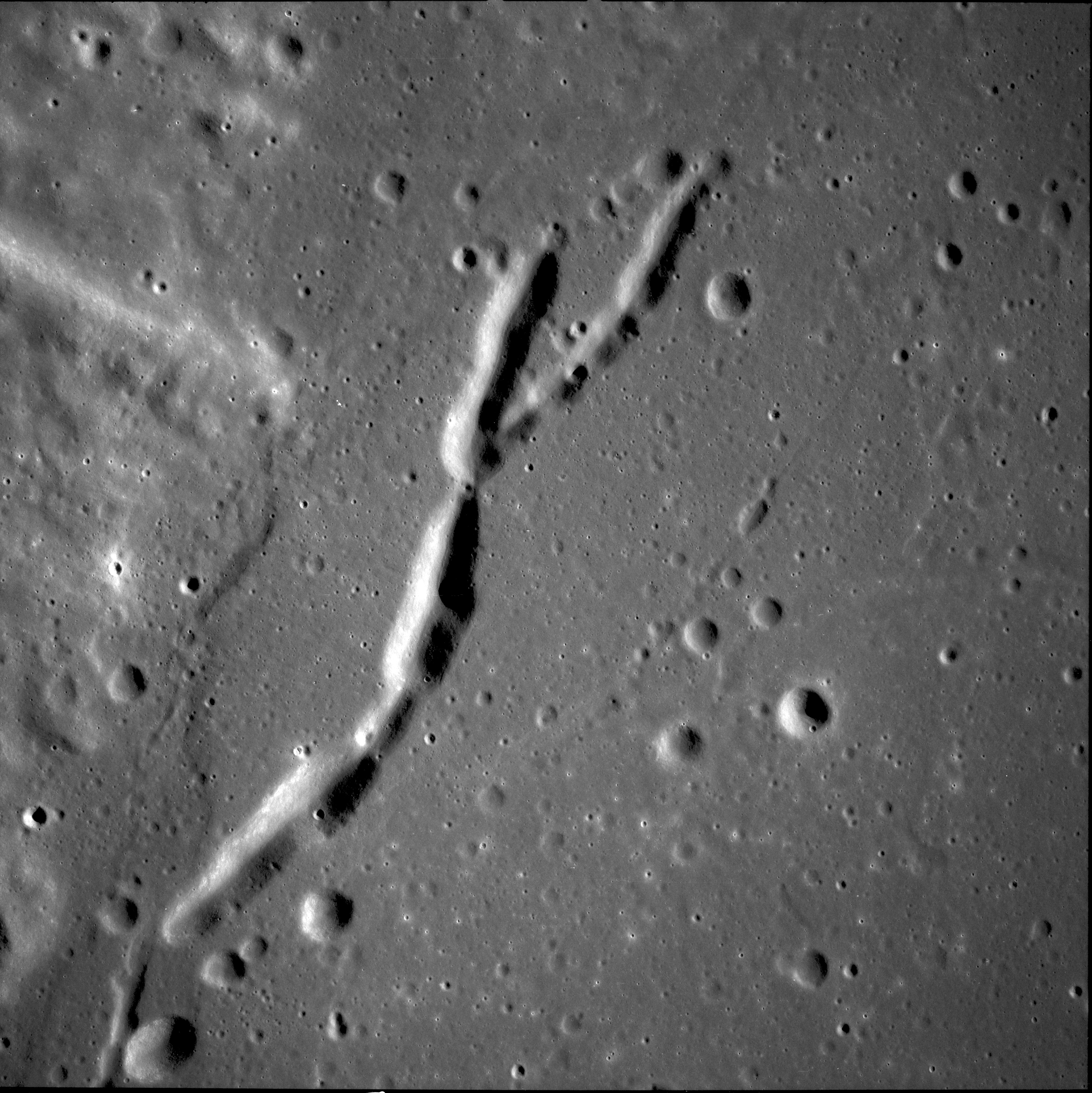
Northeastern portion of Rimae Secchi. Photo by Apollo 11, 1969.

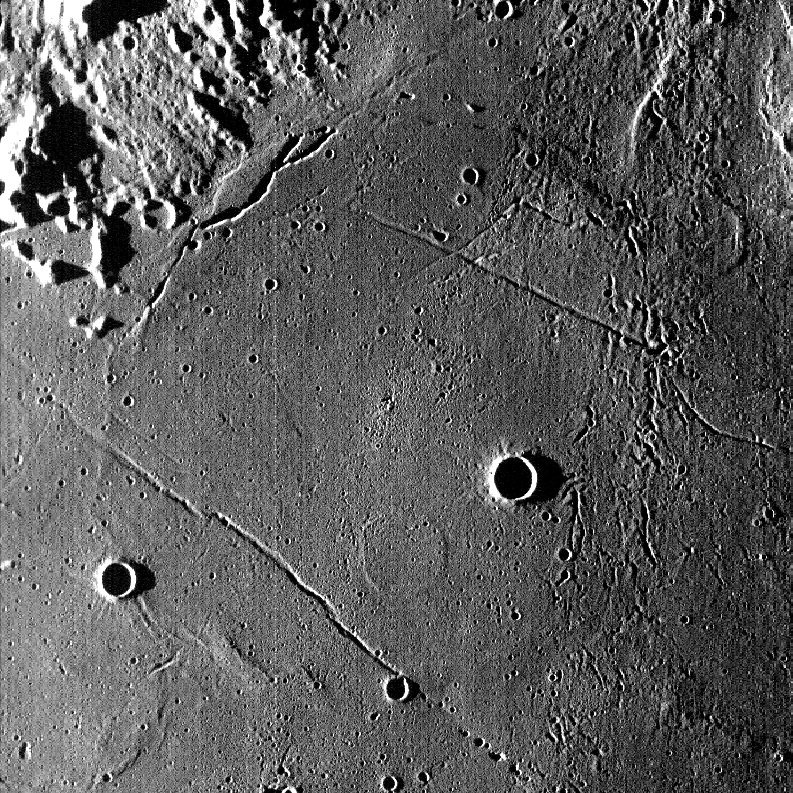
Ghost crater with Rimae Secchi atop its northwestern rim. A smaller ghost crater is seen inside the bigger one. Photo by LRO, 2018.

Rimae Secchi is a system of rilles on the Moon, in northwestern Mare Fecunditatis. They are approximately 40 km long and run along the shore of the mare.

Rimae Secchi are named after the nearby crater Secchi which, in turn, is named after an Italian astronomer Angelo Secchi. The name of the rilles was approved by the International Astronomical Union in 1985. In 1974, the name Fossae Secchi was proposed on a map published by the US Defense Mapping Agency, but this name was not adopted (on the Moon, the term Rima is traditionally used instead of Fossa). Before this, during preparation to Apollo 8 and 10 flight, the rilles were informally nicknamed Apollo Rille.

The northern end of Rimae Secchi is Y-shaped, and the southern part consists of several separate troughs. Rimae Secchi run along the northwestern rim of a ghost crater (lava-filled crater) of approximately 85 km diameter. The rilles are centered at 1.0°N 44.1°E.

The northern part of Rimae Secchi is surrounded with a dark halo, probably pyroclastic deposits like volcanic ash. Such deposits are common near the edges of lunar maria, including several areas in Mare Fecunditatis.

To see this feature, a telescope with an aperture of 20 cm or larger is needed.

== Literature ==
- Rükl A. (2004). Atlas of the Moon. Cambridge: Sky Publishing Corp. pp. 100–101. ISBN 1-931559-07-4.
- Chu A., Paech W., Weigand M. (2012). The Cambridge Photographic Moon Atlas. Cambridge University Press. p. 50. doi:10.1017/CBO9781139095709.014. ISBN 9781107019737.
