= Mahendralal Sarkar =

Bengali medical doctor and social reformer

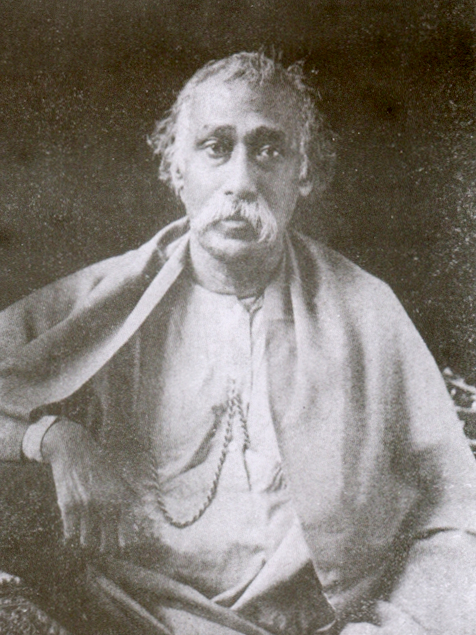
- Born: 2 November 1833; Paikpara village, Howrah district, India
- Died: 23 February 1904 (aged 70); Calcutta, India
- Occupations: Physician, academic
- Spouse: Rajkumari

Mahendralal Sarkar
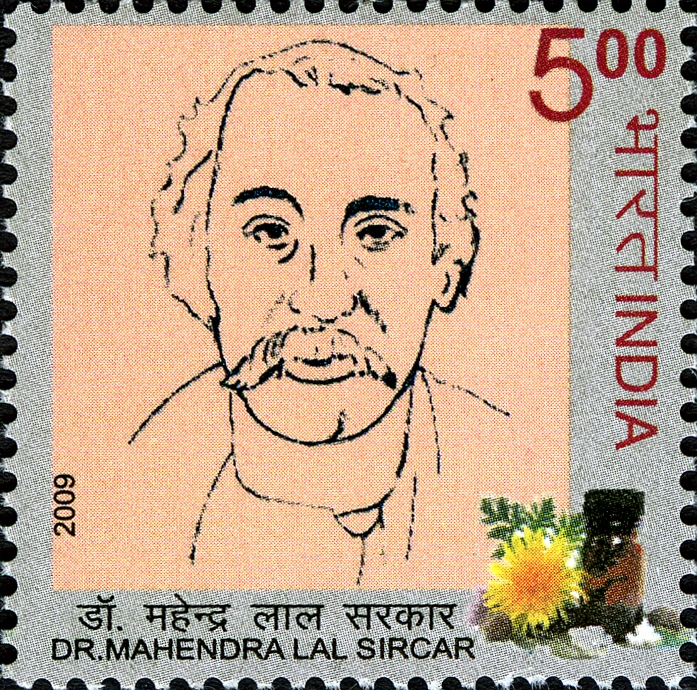
- A commemorative postage stamp on Mahendra Lal Sircar issued on 2 November 2009 by Department of Posts, Government of India.
- Type: Commemorative
- Country of issue: INDIA
- Date of issue: 2 November 2009
- Face value: INR 05.00

Mahendralal Sarkar CIE (other spellings: মহেন্দ্রলাল সরকার, Mahendra Lal Sarkar, Mahendralal Sircar; 2 November 1833 – 23 February 1904) was a Bengali medical doctor (MD), the second MD to graduate from the Calcutta Medical College, social reformer, and propagator of scientific studies in nineteenth-century India. He was the founder of the Indian Association for the Cultivation of Science.

== Early life and education ==
Mahendralal Sarkar was born at Paikpara village in Howrah district in the Bengal Province of British India. He lost his father when he was five years old and his mother when he was nine years old. He was brought up by his maternal uncles, Iswar Chandra Ghosh and Mahesh Chandra Ghosh, in their house at Nebutala in Calcutta. First he was sent to a "gurumasai", or tutor, to learn Bengali, and subsequently to another tutor named Thakurdas Dey, to learn English. On learning some English, he secured admission to Hare School as a free student in 1840. In 1849, he passed the junior scholarship examination and joined Hindu College, where he studied until 1854. At that time, Hindu College did not have facilities for teaching science, and as he was bent upon studying medicine, he transferred to Calcutta Medical College.

At Calcutta Medical College he was so esteemed by his professors that in the second year of his course he was invited by them to deliver a series of lectures on optics to his fellow students, a task he performed honourably. He had a brilliant career at that college, where, besides winning several scholarships, he passed the final examination in 1860 with the highest honours in medicine, surgery, and midwifery. In 1863, he took the degree of M.D. with special success. He and Jagabandhu Bose were the second MDs of the Calcutta University after Chandrakumar De (1862).

== Career ==
Although educated in the traditional European system of medicine, Mahendralal Sarkar later turned to homoeopathy due to the inability of ordinary Indians to afford treatment with Western medicines. He was influenced by reading William Morgan's The Philosophy of Homeopathy, and by interaction with Rajendralal Dutt, a leading homoeopathic practitioner of Calcutta. In a meeting of the Bengal branch of the British Medical Association, he proclaimed homoeopathy to be superior to the "Western medicine" of the time. Consequently, he was ostracised by the British doctors, and had to undergo loss in practice for some time. However, soon he regained his practice and went on to become a leading homoeopathic practitioner in Calcutta, as well as India.

In the course of his career, he treated several notable persons of those days, including the author Bankimchandra Chattopadhyay, the ascetic Ramakrishna, the Maharaja of Tripura, and others.

== Activism and reforms ==
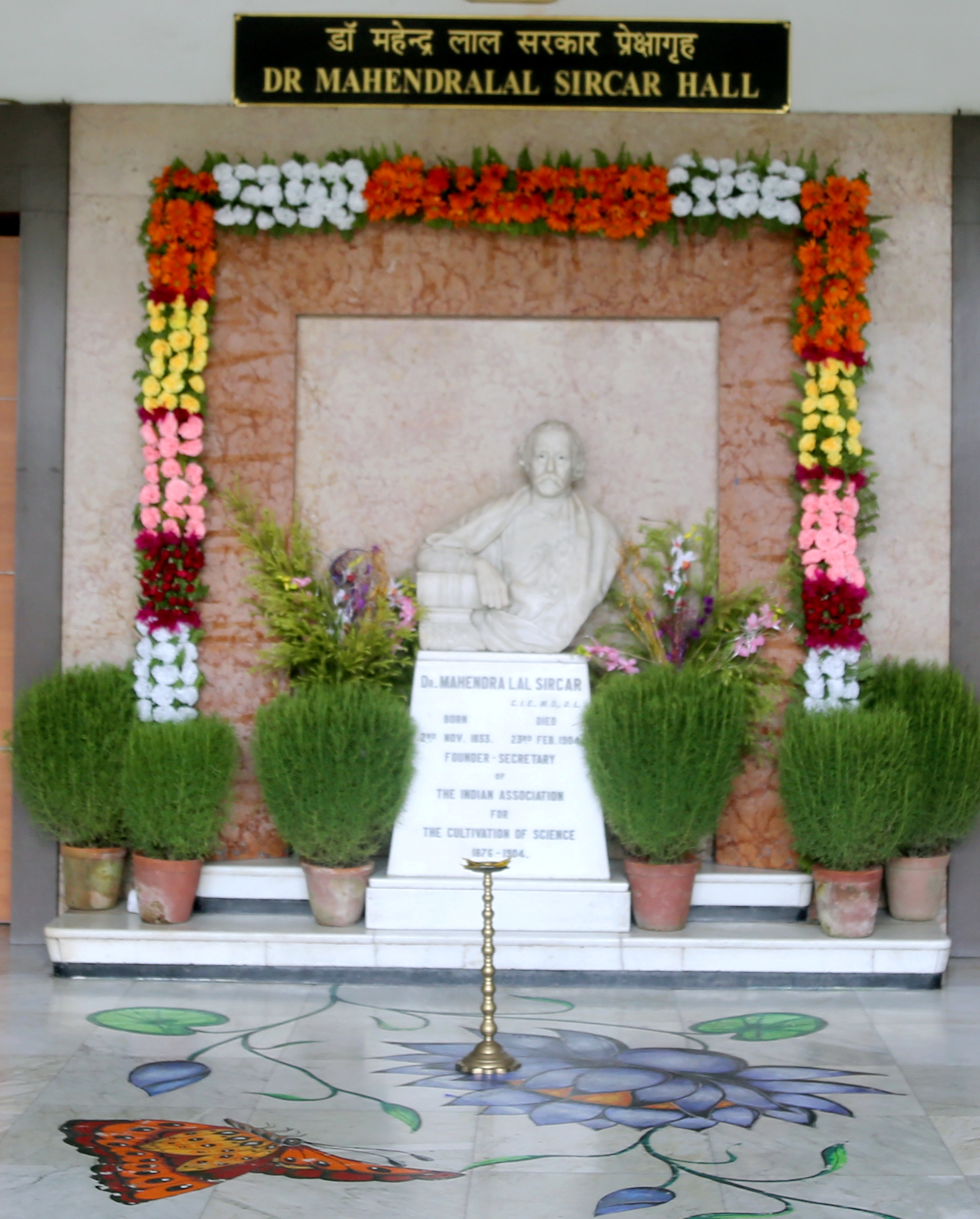
Bust of ML Sircar at the Indian Association for the Cultivation of Science in front of ML Sircar Hall.

Mahendralal Sarkar started a campaign with the motto of reconstructing colonial India in 1867 for a national science association. He planned for an association with Sashibhusan Chattopadhyay FRGS FRSA that would be funded, run, and managed by native Indians, with the aim of turning out a pool of scientists for national reconstruction. The Indian Association for the Cultivation of Science (IACS) was established in 1876, and Sarkar was its first secretary. IACS was the first national science association of India. Basic science departments such as physics, chemistry, mathematics, physiology, geology, botany, etc. were established, and notable Indian scientists participated in the association. Regular lectures and demonstrations were arranged for the public to popularise science. The weekly lectures of Saint Xavier's College Jesuit Father, Eugène Lafont, cofounder of the IACS were particularly popular.

Sarkar supported women's education in nineteenth-century India, when higher education among women was rare. For example, he was a supporter of Abala Bose's decision to pursue the study of medicine at Madras Medical College instead of Calcutta Medical College, where admission of females was not permitted. He also arranged for Sarala Devi Chaudhurani's attendance at the evening lectures at IACS so that she could pursue higher studies in physics.

== Awards and honours ==
He was a fellow of Calcutta University and an honorary magistrate and Sheriff of Calcutta (1887). He was made a CIE in 1883 and honoured with an honorary doctorate degree by the University of Calcutta in 1898.
