= Arun Kumar Biswas =

Indian scientist (1934–2015)

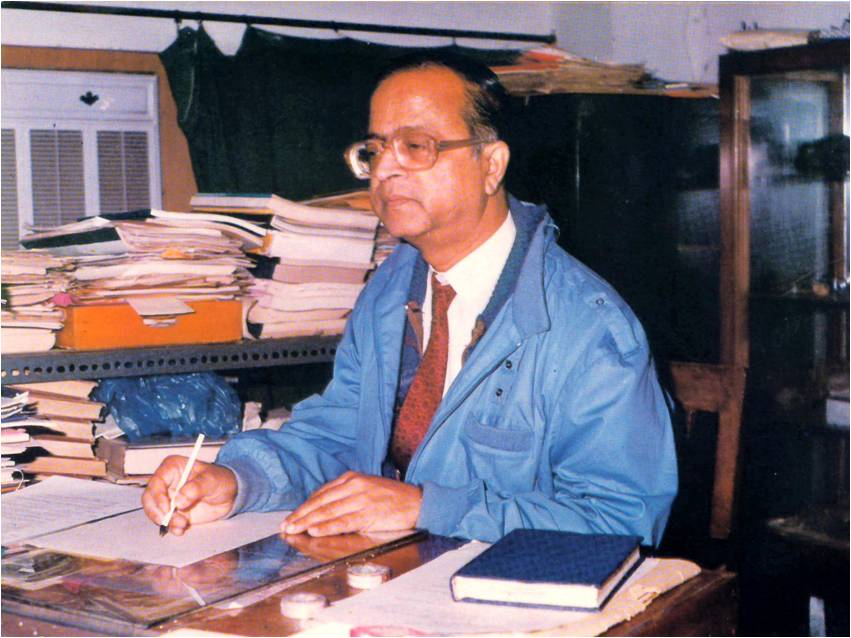
- Biswas in 1995
- Born: 6 July 1934; Kolkata, West Bengal, India
- Died: 30 November 2015 (aged 81); Kolkata, India
- Education: St. Xavier College, Kolkata, Science College, Kolkata, Massachusetts Institute of Technology
- Spouse: Sulekha Biswas
- Children: 1
- Scientific career
- Fields: Metallurgy, mineral processing, archaeometallurgy, minerals and gemstones, history of science, Languages
- Workplaces: Indian Institute of Technology, Kanpur (1963–94); Asiatic Society, Kolkata (1995–2002), Jadavpur University (AICTE Fellow, 2002–05), Indian Institute of Advanced Studies, Shimla

Arun Kumar Biswas (6 July 1934 – 30 November 2015) was a professor at Indian Institute of Technology, Kanpur (India) during 1963–95. He is well known for his contributions in the area of mineral engineering, archaeometallurgy, minerals and gems in antiquity, history of science, philosophy, science and music, etc. Biswas was the founding member of Indian Institute of Mineral Engineers (1969). Founder president of Indian Language Society in the early 1980s at IIT/K, he served several organizations in various honorary capacities: Mahendralal Sircar Research Professor in History of Science at the Asiatic Society, Kolkata (1995–2001); the AICTE Emeritus Fellow at the Jadavpur University (2001–2004); and INSA Research Fellow in Kolkata. He was a member of the INSA National Commission for History of Science and, the editorial board member of the Indian Journal of the History of Science.

== Early years and education ==
After his initial studies at Saint Xaviers College (1948–52), he went on to Science College (1952–59) (both in Calcutta) to complete his Master and Doctorate degrees in Applied Chemistry. He submitted his doctoral thesis (1959) on surface-active agents from glycerides and their fascinating micellar world in aqueous solutions. Inspired by the advice of his mentor, Dr. K.K. Majumdar (who later became the founding President of the Indian Institute of Mineral Engineers (IIME)), Biswas took up mineral engineering as one of the goals of his professional career and the study of the challenging subject of froth flotation which involved the investigations related to surface science, one of his passions. In his own words, '... (he) contacted Professor AM Gaudin of MIT and was warmly invited ... and then opened before him the glamorous world of MIT education in several fields: mineralogy and crystallography (William Dennen and Martin Burger), optical mineralogy (GE Agar), mineral engineering (AM Gaudin), physical chemistry of surfaces (PL de Bruyn and Alan Michaels) and even archaeometallurgy (the famous CS Smith) and history of science and civilization (guess who, Aldous Huxley who was a Visiting Professor during the Centenary year of 1961)!' He went to MIT as a Fulbright Fellow. At MIT (1960–63), he worked on hysteresis of contact angle under the guidance of Professor Antoine Marc Gaudin. Learning at MIT was not confined to science of mineral processing; he continued with his interest in music, which he developed in early fifties, and simultaneously attended a course in Music Department on 'Music Appreciation'.

== IIT Kanpur era (1963–95) ==
Professor Biswas returned to India in 1963 and joined Department of Metallurgical Engineering (now Materials and Metallurgical Engineering) at the Indian Institute of Technology, Kanpur. He was the founding members of the department where he served as a faculty member during (1963–95).

=== Contributions to mineral processing ===
The essence of his early years at IIT Kanpur can be gauged from his personal recollection, 'During the period 1964–1970, Biswas was extremely busy in organising the mineral engineering programme at IIT Kanpur in collaboration with his esteemed colleagues: TC Rao who had worked with Professor AJ Lynch in Australia, A Ghosh who had worked with Professor TB King at MIT, and the two geologist colleagues: KVGK Gokhale who wrote a book on mineral resources in India, co-authored by TC Rao, and BC Ray Mahasay the renowned geochemist from the Harvard University. Professor Gerhard Derge had gone back to USA, but he kept on sending valuable advice to Biswas on the subject of mineral engineering ... 1968 ..., A K Biswas planned a Short Course on 'Mineral Engineering Practice' to be held at IIT Kanpur on 27 and 28 February 1969, to be followed by a Seminar on "Mineral Engineering Education" scheduled on 1 March ... An invitation was sent to Professor AM Gaudin through the KIAP (unfortunately the visit did not take place) .... Professor Gaudin's love for antiquity was very deep and infectious, imbibed by many of his students, including AK Biswas'. In 1969, he published his first book, Science in India (Firma KLM, Kolkata). Along with Dr. KK Majumdar, head of ore dressing section at BARC and several other stalwarts working in the area of mineral processing, he played a very active role in the setting up of Indian Institute of Mineral Engineers (IIME) which was registered as a Society on 12 November 1969. On his association with IIME, in 2012, he observed, 'I was proud (and still am) to become the first Life Member of the proposed institute'.

During his distinguished career of 32 years (1963–94) at IIT/K, Biswas developed and taught several courses related to mineral processing. He established the Materials Separation and Surface Chemistry laboratories. Biswas enjoyed the reputation of a dedicated teacher and was popular among students. Industrial perspective was a hallmark of his teaching. Starting from his early career, he used to visit mineral based industry/institutes almost every summer. Besides teaching, he guided many students in their research at Doctoral, Masters and Bachelors levels. Many of them are well-established professionals now in India and abroad.

Biswas believed that both basic and applied research are critical for the industry. He advocated the importance of characterisation in mineral research and collaborated with several of his colleagues in the institute, notably professors TR Ramachandran and Ranjit K Ray. The motivation of many of the research projects pursued under his guidance was to find innovative means of beneficiating several complex and/or low-grade Indian mineral deposits, such as monazite beach sand, zircon, molybdenite, diamond, phos¬phorites, zinc ferrite, zinc tailings and residues, alumina-rich iron ore, pyrite, separation amongst calcium mineral systems, Kudremukh-iron ore tailing, deep sea manganese nodules, ferrotungsten deposits etc. Simultaneous studies were also carried out in his laboratory on several key unit operations in mineral processing, such as comminution, froth flotation, selective flocculation, leaching and bacterial leaching . In basic research, some studies by Biswas and his coworkers received international attention; for example:

- role of CO2 in calcite flotation
- collector-frother interactions
- adsorption at three phase interline
- tannin-fatty acids and starch-fatty acids interactions in calcite-fluorite flotation separation
- selective dispersion and flocculation in hematite-clay system

In late seventies and eighties, Biswas and coworkers made important contributions towards characterization of mineral separation systems using XRD, SEM with X-ray microanalysis, EPMA, TEM and several spectroscopic techniques (IR, NMR, Mossbauer, etc.). The systems studied included fine grained alumina-rich Indian iron ore, Zn-containing flotation tails, Zawar ancient siliceous slag and retorts, and ferromanganese nodules from the Indian Ocean and their synthetic analogues, chalcopyrite, and synthetic tungsten minerals. Biswas participated in several important international conferences such as International Mineral Processing Congresses (Cannes, 1963; Prague, 1970; Cagliari, 1975; Warsaw, 1979) and International Symposium on Surfactants, Gainesville, Florida, 1990.

=== Contributions to archaeometallurgy and beyond ===
Biswas's intellectual activities extended far beyond mineral engineering and covered languages, archaeometallurgy, minerals and gems in ancient India, literature, music and religions – mostly in the Indian context. Biswas was the founder-president of the Indian Languages Society, which organized a national seminar on Profiles in Indian languages during 10–12 December 1982. The proceedings of the seminar were published as a multi-authored book Profiles in Indian languages and literatures, which received international acclaim. The period around 1980 was also the beginning of his increasing interest in archaeometallurgy. Characterisation studies on ancient slag and retorts from Zawar mines later culminated in a number of papers on the primacy of India in brass and zinc metallurgy. During 1987–90, History of Science Division of Indian National Science Academy (INSA) sponsored a project on 'Minerals and Metals in Ancient India up to 1200 AD from Sanskrit Literature and other Sources'. In this project, he was ably assisted by his wife, Sulekha, a Sanskrit scholar. The project completion report submitted in 1991 later (in 1996) resulted in the publication of the monumental monograph called 'Minerals and Metals in Ancient India'. This two volume monograph (volume 1 – Archaeological Evidence, Volume – 2 Literary Evidence) tells the fascinating, coherently woven story of the Mineral and Metals from across the entire sub-continental sprawl of the old-world India (including Pakistan and Bangladesh). In following years (1991–94), INSA sponsored another project on Minerals and Metals in Pre-Modern period (1200–1900 AD) which led to the publication of several interesting papers in Indian J History of Science; Gem minerals in pre-Modern India, Non-Gem Minerals in Pre-modern India and Iron and Steel in Pre-modern India. Biswas delved deep into the ancient Indian texts and established the etymology of beryllium-containing minerals in the Indian and world literature – particularly of Beryl (Vaidurya) and emerald (Marakata). Similarly, other topics related to history of science included : History of science in India : In search of a new paradigm, Rasa-Ratna Samuccaya and Mineral Processing State of Art in the 13th Century A.D. India, Revered father Eugene Lafont and science activity of St Xavier's College,

During the period 1985–94, he also wrote and edited several books

- Swami Vivekananda and the Indian Quest for Socialism (Firma KLM Pvt Ltd, Calcutta, 1986);
- A Pilgrimage to Khetri and the Sarasvati Valley (Sujan Publications, Calcutta, 1987);
- Buddha and Bodhisattva – A Hindu View (Cosmo Publications, New Delhi, 1987);
- Frontiers in Applied Chemistry (edited volume, Springer Verlag, Berlin and Narosa Publishing House, New Delhi, 1989); and
- Swami Vijnanananda and his Paramahamsa Carita (Sujan Publication, 1994).

The superannuation of Professor Biswas from IIT/K on 31 July 1994, marked the beginning of a new chapter in his life. He moved to Kolkata where he spent a lot more time with Ramakrishna Mission. He served several organizations in various honorary capacities for example, Mahendralal Sircar Research Professor in History of Science at the Asiatic Society, Kolkata (1995–2001); the AICTE Emeritus Fellow at the Jadavpur University (2001–2004); and INSA Research Fellow in Kolkata. He joined as a member of the INSA National Commission for History of Science and the editorial board member of the Indian Journal of the History of Science.

== Post IIT Kanpur era ==
=== Research papers and book reviews ===
Biswas's academic interest and firm conviction that both social sciences and humanities and science and technology are essential for human progress, propelled him to publish a large number of research papers and reviews on a wide spectrum of topics. The topics covered included: Epic of Saltpetre to Gunpowder; Why did Scientific Renaissance take place in Europe and not in India; Brass and zinc metallurgy in the ancient and medieval world : India's primacy and the technology transfer to the west, Raman, Krishnan and the IACS Episodes of the 1930s; The Era of Science Enthusiasts in Bengal (1841–1891): Akshayakumar's; Vidyasagar and Rajendralala; Calcuttan Science 1784–1930 and the Awakening in India; Rammohun Roy, his Intellectual Compatriots and their Scientific Contributions; Science in the Path of Syncretism, Syncretism in the Future of Humankind – Some Golden thoughts of Swami Vivekananda; Social Factors in the Development of Technology in Ancient India; Science, Spirituality and Socialism: A Tribute to Joseph Needham; Science and Music with a Special Note on Helmholtz, James Jeans to Pandit Ravishankar. He also published some interesting book reviews, such as: Images and Contexts: The Historiography of Science and Modernity in India; Story of the Delhi Iron Pillar; The Indus Civilization, A People's History of India. Jagadish Chandra Bose and National Science; Kautilya's Arthasastra in the light of modern science and technology; An Eye For Excellence: (Fifty Innovative Years of IIT Kanpur); la vintage metallurgie (coffee table book, CSIR-NML); Caught between two Cultures – Science in Nineteenth Century Bengal, etc.

=== Books ===
Some of his well-known books after 1995 include:

- Minerals and Metals in Ancient India (volume 1 – Archaeological Evidence, Volume – 2 Literary Evidence) (D.K. Printworld (P) Ltd., 1996)
- Gleanings of the past and the science movement : in the diaries of Drs. Mahendralal and Amritalal Sircar (The Asiatic Society, 2000);
- History, Science and Society in the Indian context (The Asiatic Society, 2001);
- Minerals and Metals in the Pre-Modern India (DK Printworld, 2001);
- Father Lafont of St. Xavier's College, Kolkata and the Contemporary Science Movement (The Asiatic Society, 2001);
- Collected Works of Mahendralal, Father Lafont and the Science Movement (The Asiatic Society, 2003);
- Science in Archaeology and Archaeo-materials (DK Printworld, 2005);
- Mineral Processing to Elemental Science in the Medieval World: India and Europe (The Asiatic Society, 2011);
- Mineral Engineering in India – Reflections (IIME, 2012); etc.

=== Writings in Bengali ===
Biswas's writings were not confined to English language alone. He also wrote several books and articles in Bengali and the topics encompassed spirituality, art and science to short stories; for example:

- ŚrīśrīRāmakr̥shṇa janmot̲asaba o abatāra-pūjāra ādiparba (Kalakātā :Phārmā Ke. Ela. Ema, 2003).
- Aśarīrī (Ḍhākā : Dibyaprakāśa, 2007)
- Raktakheko hīrera putula (Dhākā : Jāgr̥ti Prakāśanī, 2011)
- Mâtri Sâdhanâ O Kamâlâkânta (Ananda Publishers Private Ltd. and Signet Press, Kolkata, 2013)
- Rgveda Theke Rta Sri Ramakrishna (Samskrita Pustak Bhandar, Kolkata, 2008)

== Postscript ==
As a part of IIT Kanpur Golden Jubilee Celebration, Biswas delivered the lecture (4th lecture under EC Subbarao Lecture Series), 'IIT Kanpur Formative Years: Some Recollections, Residents and Visitors' – a nostalgic recollection of IIT Kanpur formative years. He also delivered Institute Lecture (18 February 2009), Why did Scientific Renaissance Take Place in Pre-Modern Europe and not in India.

He died on 30 November 2015. As a mark of respect and tribute to Professor Biswas, the organising committee of The International Conference on Mineral Processing Technology (MPT 2016), the fourteenth edition in the series and the annual technical meeting of the Indian Institute of Mineral Engineers (IIME) (January 2016, Pune), organized a special plenary session dedicated to his memory. A Special Commemorative Issue of Trans IIM on Mineral Processing and Metallurgy in Memory of Professor Arun Kumar Biswas is published (Transactions of the Indian Institute of Metals, Volume 70, Issue 2, March 2017). The issue was released during MPT 2017, held at Mahabalipuram from 1–3 February 2017.
