= St. Joseph's School, Darjeeling =

St. Joseph's School, North Point, Darjeeling
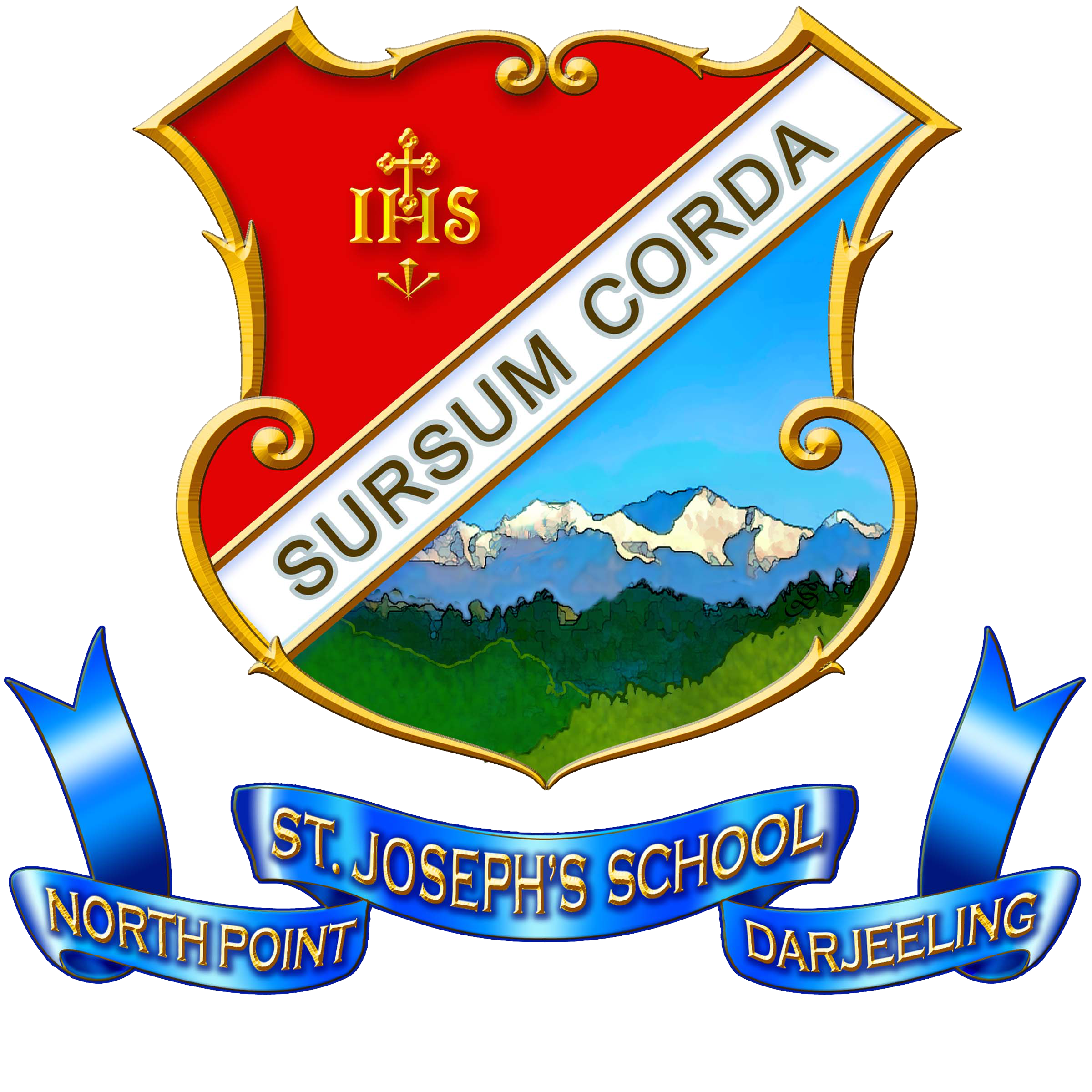

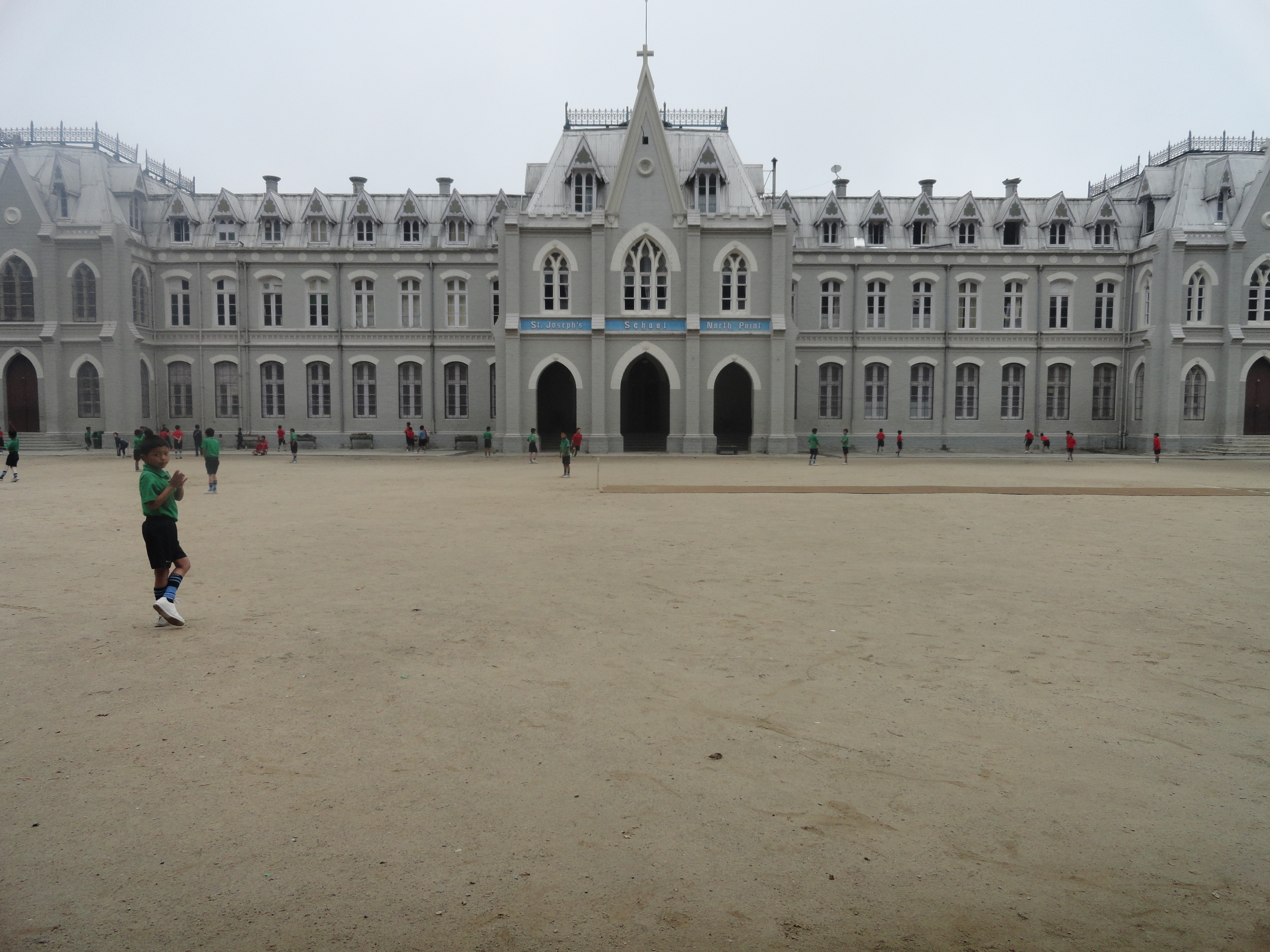
- Coat of arms

Location
- West Bengal; India; 27°03′42″N 88°15′09″E

Information
- Other name: North Point
- Former name: St Joseph's College, Darjeeling
- Type: Private primary and secondary school
- Motto: Latin: Sursum Corda (Lift Up Your Hearts)
- Religious affiliation: Catholicism
- Denomination: Society of Jesus
- Established: 1888; 138 years ago
- Founder: Fr. Henri Depelchin, S.J.
- School board: CISCE
- School district: Darjeeling
- Rector: Fr. Stanley Karakkada, S.J.
- Gender: Boys
- Enrollment: 1,220
- Houses: O'Neil: Latin: Velocitur Ad Finem; Depelchin: Latin: Dando Se Illuminat; Laenen: Latin: Vocans Ad Sublimora; Fallon: Latin: Vigilando Vincitur
- Colours: Navy and sky blue
- Sports: Basketball; Swimming; Football; Table Tennis; Cricket; Volleyball; Badminton; Track and Field; Lawn Tennis; Chess; Billiards; Kickboxing
- Nickname: North Pointers; Josephites
- Publication: Among Ourselves (Monthly)
- Yearbook: The North Point Annual
- Prefect: Fr. John Banerjee
- Website: sjcnorthpoint.com

St. Joseph's School, Darjeeling, popularly called North Point or N.P. (as it serves as a landmark for the North Point locality in Darjeeling), is a private Catholic school primary and secondary school for boys located in Darjeeling, West Bengal, India. Originally called St. Joseph's College, the school was founded in the year 1888 and is owned and managed by the Jesuits

== History ==
St. Joseph's School, Darjeeling was founded by Fr. Henri Depelchin with 25 students on 13 February 1888, at Sunnybank, Darjeeling. The following captured a chronological sequence of events that led to the foundation of the school:

1888

- 13 February 1888 - saw the official opening of St Joseph’s College at Sunnybank (above the present Bishop’s House, Darjeeling)
- 14 February 1888 - Classes Begin with 25 students (18 boarders and 7 Day- scholars)
- 10 July 1888 - The North Point property was bought from the Government of India. Building work was entrusted to Brother Eugene Rotsaert who with the help of 2000 men leveled the ground by the end of December 1888.
- 15 August 1888 - Affiliation of Boys’ Sodality to the Prima Primaria in Rome
- 16 November 1888 - First Rector’s Day
- 13 December 1888 - The End of the First Academic Year December 1888 - Ladbrooke Farm (the present UD Flat) was acquired from the Maharaja of Burdwan on a long lease

=== 1889 ===
- 22 February - Beginning of the second academic year at Sunnybank Cadet Corps came into being in the College
- 2 May 1889 - The Foundations for the College building marked out
- 3 May 1889 - First cricket match. The opponents were an Army team. St Joseph’s College won.
- 10 May 1889 - Building work started. Stones were quarried from Ladbrooke Farm.
- 27 April 1890 - Blessing of the foundation stone by His Grace, Archbishop Goethals

=== 1891 ===
- 8 December - Blessing of the New College building by Fr Depelchin

=== 1892 ===
- Fr Neut was appointed Rector Establishment of a section for University Students known as the ‘Special Department’. This section prepared young men for the different government Examinations such as the Superior Branch Accounts, Police, Finance, Opium, Forest etc. as well for the London Matriculation Examination, and for Entrance into the Thomson C.E. College, Roorkee, and Cooper’s Hill.
- 18 February 1892 - Classes began in the New Building at North Point. February - Visit of Lord Lansdowne, Viceroy of India

North Point celebrated its 125th year anniversary on 10 November 2013 which was graced by the presence of the then President of India, Shri Pranab Mukherjee.

== School system ==
The school is divided into four divisions:

- Primary Division – Classes 1 to 5
- Lower Division – Classes 6, 7 and 8
- Upper Division – Classes 9 and 10
- Senior Division – Classes 11 and 12

The Primary division has eight captains, the lower division has eight head boys, the upper division has eight prefects, the senior division has eight beadles. These are the student representatives and leaders of the school from both the boarding and day scholar sections of the school, appointed on leadership, academic, and sportsmanship abilities. Also all the classes in the school have two monitors, one from the boarding section and other one from day scholar section.

The school provides facilities for various games such as cricket, football, basketball, volleyball, table tennis, chess; and also engages in co-curricular activities such as quiz, debate, music and drama. The school also encompasses a variety of clubs ranging from the Western Vocals Singing Club to the Elections Literacy Club. Over the years of its long history, the school has developed a competitive rivalry in Inter-School Tournaments with the other Anglo-Indian schools of Darjeeling and Kalimpong, particularly St. Paul's School, Darjeeling, and St. Augustine's School, Kalimpong.

== House system ==
The school has four houses:

1. Depelchin House (Red)
2. Fallon House (Blue)
3. Laenen House (Yellow)
4. O'Neil House (Green)

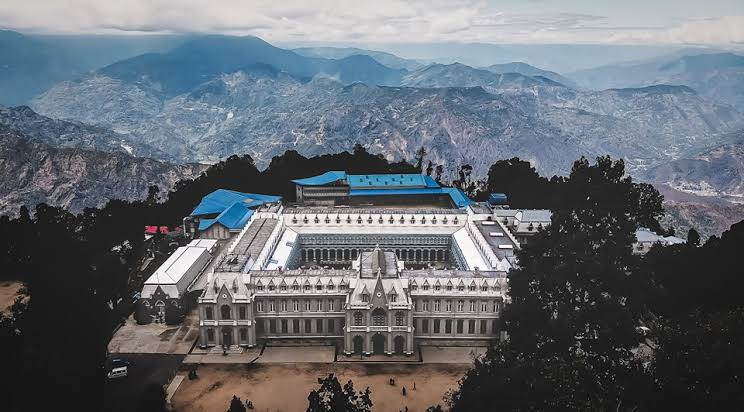

== Publications ==
The school has a number of publications, which include the Among Ourselves (monthly), and the North Point Annual (yearly), all compiled and edited by the students' Editorial Board.

== School rankings ==
In 2020, St. Joseph's School, North Point ranked second among boarding schools in Darjeeling and West Bengal and, in 2021, eleventh in India according to the Education-World India School Rankings. The school has consistently been regarded as among the most prestigious boarding schools in India. In continuation with the excellence in academics, St. Joseph's School, Darjeeling is ranked 8th amongst the Vintage Boarding Schools category as published in the reputed EducationWorld India school rankings for 2024-25.

== Notable alumni ==
- Admiral Ronald Lynsdale Pereira – ninth Chief of Naval Staff
- Erick Avari – Hollywood actor
- E J Anthony – Founding member of Group Analytic Society and child Psychiatrist
- Birendra Bir Bikram Shah Dev – former King of Nepal
- Gyanendra Bir Bikram Shah Dev – former King of Nepal
- Paras Bir Bikram Shah Dev – former Crown Prince of Nepal
- Lawrence Durrell – poet and novelist
- Michael Ferreira – world billiard champion
- William John Harper—Rhodesian politician
- Jamyang Norbu – Tibetan activist and author
- Cardinal Lawrence T. Picachy – Archbishop of Calcutta
- Kasit Piromya – former Foreign Minister of Thailand
- Frank Ryan – first-class cricketer
- Tsoltim Ngima Shakabpa – international banker, activist, writer and poet
- Jigme Singye Wangchuck – former King of Bhutan
- Yeshey Zimba – former Prime Minister of Bhutan
- Brian Hayes - Australian KC and co-producer of the movie "Hotel Mumbai"
- Jeremy Bujakowski - Polish–Indian alpine skier
- Pratapaditya Pal - Art-historian
- Gyanedra, last King of Nepal

== See also ==
- List of Jesuit schools
- List of schools in West Bengal
