= St. Vincent's High School =

St. Vincent's High School, Pune

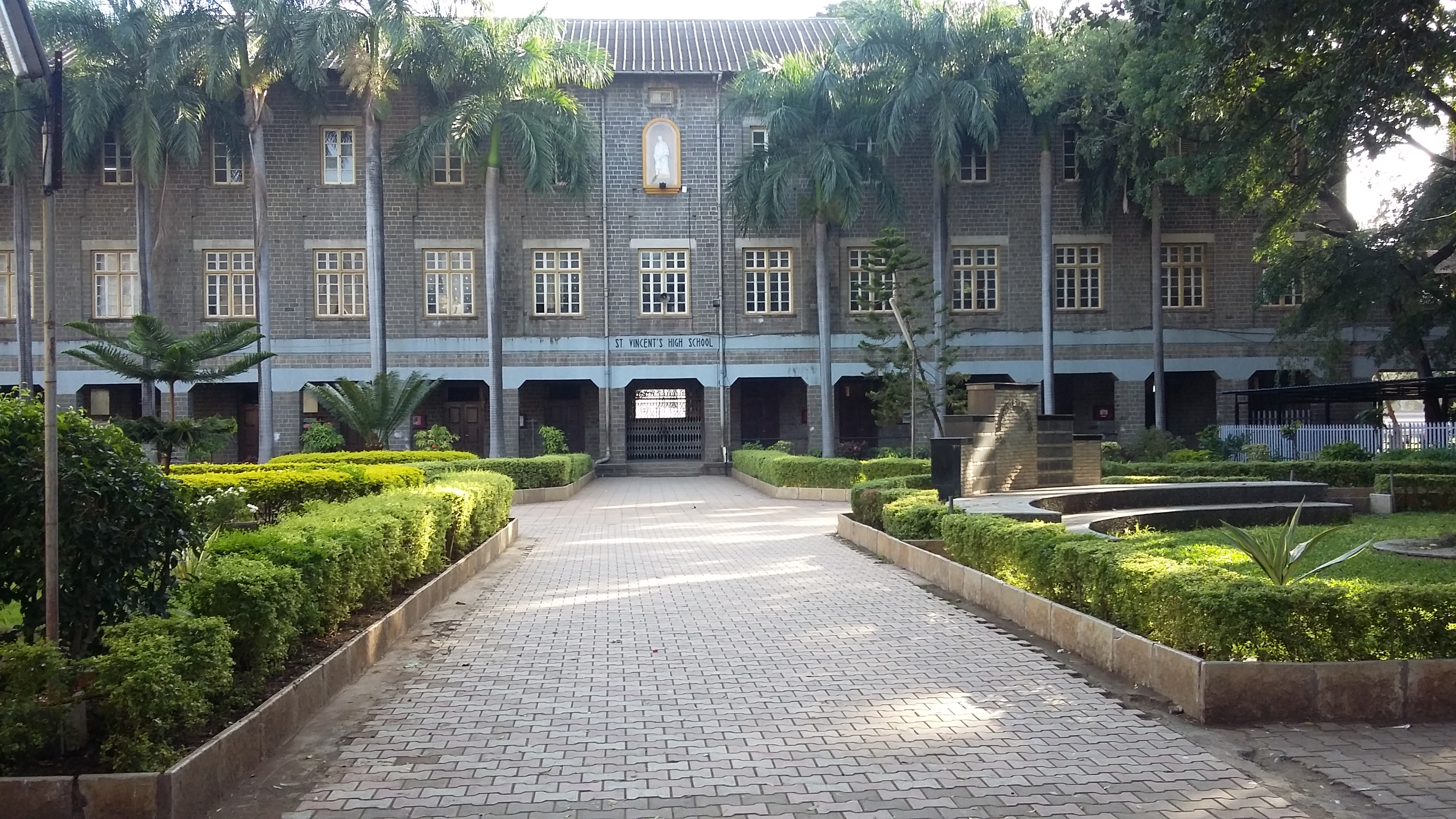

Location
- Pune; Maharashtra; India
- Coordinates: 18°30′46″N 73°52′30″E

Information
- Type: Private primary and secondary school
- Motto: To Dare and Do and Win
- Religious affiliation(s): Catholicism
- Denomination: Jesuits
- Patron saint(s): Vincent de Paul
- Established: 1867; 158 years ago
- Principal: Fr. Titus Thangaraj, S.J.
- Grades: PreK-12
- Gender: Boys
- Enrollment: 3,500–4,000
- Language: English
- Campus size: 4.5 acres (1.8 ha)
- Color(s): Cream
- Nickname: Vincentians
- Website: stvincentspune.com

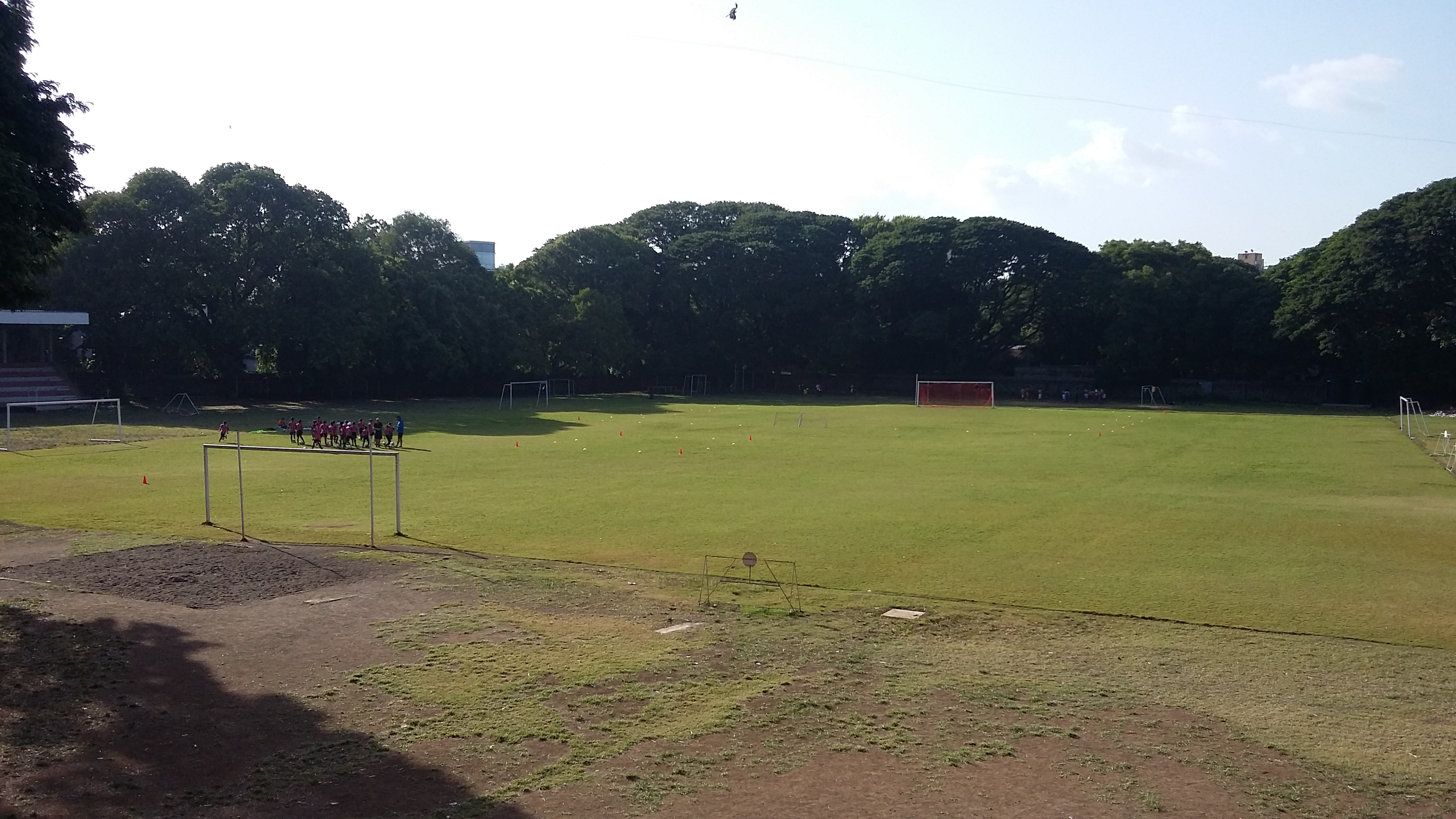
School Playground

Old campus

St. Vincent's High School is a private Catholic primary and secondary school and pre-university college for boys located in the city of Pune, Maharashtra, India. The English-medium convent school was founded by the Jesuits in 1867, located and is named in honour of Vincent de Paul, a seventeenth-century saint known for his love for the poor and the downtrodden. The school, which is recognized by the Government of Maharashtra, prepares pupils for the Secondary School Certificate Examination (Std. X) and for the Higher Secondary Certificate examination (Std. XII).

== Management ==
It is owned by the Poona Catholic Educational Association and managed by the Poona Jesuit School's Society, which belong to the Christian Religious Minority group, and therefore it enjoys the rights and privileges guaranteed by Article 30 (I) of the Constitution of India. It is considered one of the best schools in Pune and provides quality education to the students. As of 2013 it was ranked at No. 9 of all boys' schools in India. The Society of Jesus, to which the Jesuit Fathers and Brothers belong, is a Catholic religious order founded by St. Ignatius of Loyola in 1540. Active in the field of education throughout the world since its origin, the Society runs 179 high schools and 98 colleges in India, in which young people of every social class, community, and linguistic group are educated through the medium of both English and the regional languages.

== Curriculum and facilities ==
St. Vincent's High School imparts English-medium education from Std.I to Std.X. The St. Vincent's Junior College prepares students for the Higher Secondary Certificate Examination. The St. Xavier's pre-primary school prepares children to study English. Admissions are competitive, based on merit. The plans on making an Olympic sized swimming pool in the campus has been achieved. The massive school football ground is just the exact size of a real football field along with a stadium to suit the audiences. The school is situated on 4.5 acres (1.8 ha).

=== Co-curriculum activities ===
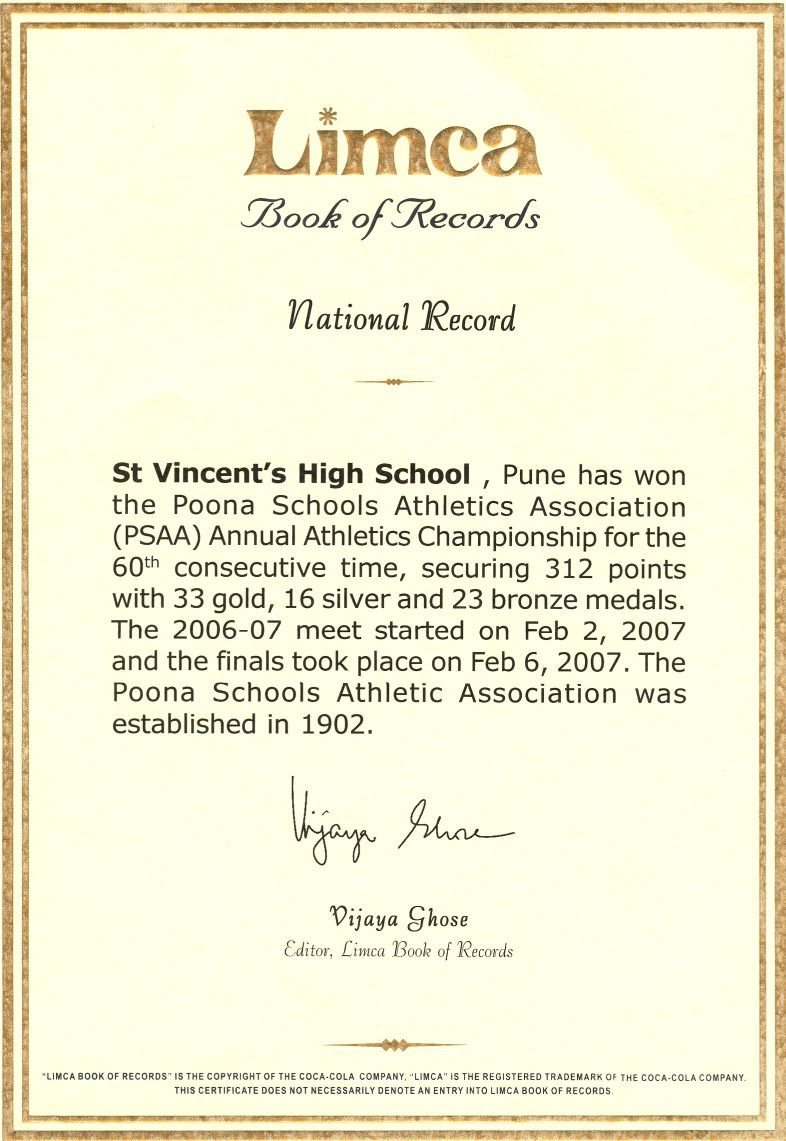
An image of the Limca Book of Records held by St. Vincent's

St. Vincent's has the notable record of winning the PSAA's (Poona Schools Athletics Association) Annual Athletics Championship for 60 consecutive years as of 6 February 2007. This achievement was recorded as a national record in the Limca Book of Records.

== Principals ==
The following individuals have served as principal of St. Vincent's High School:

Ordinal	Officeholder	Term start	Term end	Time in office
1	Fr. Joseph Brunner, S.J.	1867	1872	4–5 years
2	Fr. Henry Depelchin, S.J.	1872	1873	0–1 years
3	Fr. Henry Schumacher, S.J.	1873	1879	5–6 years
4	Fr. George Weniger, S.J.	1879	1880	0–1 years
5	Fr. Ignatius Kunzler, S.J.	1880	1881	0–1 years
6	Fr. Jusoph Nuckle, S.J.	1881	1883	1–2 years
7	Fr. William Althoff, S.J.	1883	1886	2–3 years
8	Fr. Bernard Beider-Linden, S.J.	1886	1887	0–1 years
9	Fr. Ferdinand Hillenkamp, S.J.	1887	1889	1–2 years
10	Fr. Kilian Hahn, S.J.	1889	1890	0–1 years
11	Fr. Joseph Willy, S.J.	1890	1895	4–5 years
12	Fr. Julius Mayr, S.J.	1895	1903	7–8 years
(10)	Fr. Killian Hahn, S.J.	1903	1908	4–5 years
13	Fr. William Windhausen, S.J.	1908	1914	5–6 years
14	Fr. Francis X. Larbolette, S.J.	1914	1915	0–1 years
15	Fr. Ernest Hoogewerf, S.J.	1915	1915	0 years
16	Fr. Peter Alborghetti, S.J.	1915	1916	0–1 years
17	Fr. Thomas Baret, S.J.	1916	1916	0 years
18	Fr. John Lauder, S.J.	1916	1918	1–2 years
19	Fr. Charles Ghezzi, S.J.	1918	1929	10–11 years
20	Fr. Maximillan Riklin, S.J.	1929	1950	20–21 years
21	Fr. Anton Rehm, S.J.	1950	1955	4–5 years
22	Fr. William Clement, S.J.	1955	1957	1–2 years
23	Fr. Rudolf Schoch, S.J.	1957	1966	8–9 years
24	Fr. Edmund D'Souza, S.J.	1966	1967	0–1 years
25	Fr. Romauld D'Souza S.J.	1967	1973	5–6 years
(23)	Fr. Rudolf Schoch, S.J.	1973	1977	3–4 years
(24)	Fr. Edmund D'Souza, S.J.	1977	1983	5–6 years
26	Fr. Kenneth Misquitta, S.J.	1983	1993	9–10 years
27	Fr. Bertie Rozario, S.J.	1993	1998	4–5 years
(26)	Fr. Kenneth Misquitta, S.J.	1998	2003	4–5 years
28	Fr. Mario Fernandes, S.J.	2003	2009	5–6 years
29	Fr. Andrew Fernandes, S.J.	2009	2019	9–10 years
30	Fr. Francis Patekar, S.J.	2019	2024	5–6 years
31	Fr. Titus Thangaraj, S. J.	2024	Incumbent	Incumbent

== Notable alumni ==
- Ebrahim Alkazi – theatre director and Padma Vibhushan
- Banoo Jehangir Coyaji – the first female to matriculate from St Vincent's, an all-boys school, in 1933
- Merwan Sheriar Irani – an Indian spiritual master
- Thomas Kailath – an electrical engineer, information theorist, control engineer, entrepreneur and the Hitachi America Professor of Engineering, Emeritus, at Stanford University

== See also ==
- List of Jesuit schools
- List of schools in Pune
- Violence against Christians in India
