= Brian Hayes (lawyer) =

Australian lawyer

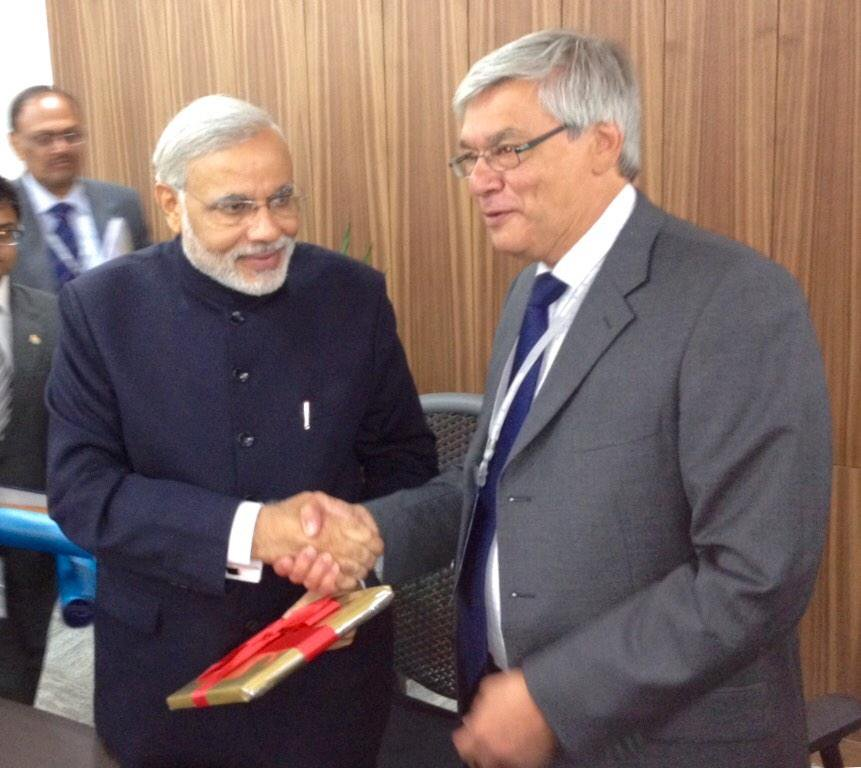
- Brian Hayes meeting with Indian Prime Minister Narendra Modi
- Born: July 1944 (age 82); Bombay, British India
- Education: St Joseph's School, Darjeeling
- Alma mater: University of London
- Occupation: Lawyer (Barrister)
- Known for: King's Counsel (KC), Former National Chairmen of the Australia India Business Council & Life Fellow of the Planning Institute of Australia
- Notable work: Executive producer of Hotel Mumbai, Producer of Emotion is Dead, Co-producer of Coconut
- Children: 3

Brian Hayes KC (born July 1944) is a prominent Indian-born Australian lawyer who specialises in public and administrative law. He was appointed as South Australia's strategic adviser to India in 2008 and has held related roles in subsequent years. He is an adjunct professor in the School of Natural and Built Environments at the University of South Australia and has acted as a consultant to federal, state and local governments. Hayes represented the Conservation Council of South Australia in an appeal against a proposal to intensively farm southern bluefin tuna in Louth Bay. The case became South Australia's longest environmental trial was ultimately successful and enshrined the precautionary principle in law.

== Career ==
Hayes studied at London University, where he completed a Bachelor of Laws with honours. Hayes was admitted to legal practice in 1971 and signed the bar roll in 1984. He was appointed Queen's Counsel in 1986. His areas of practice include appellate advocacy, commercial litigation and land acquisition. His practice is located in Adelaide, South Australia. In January 2005, Hayes was appointed deputy presiding member of the Legal Practitioners Disciplinary Tribunal for a term of three years, under the Legal Practitioners Act 1981.

In 2013, Hayes told ABC radio that he had acted professionally for environmental groups, residents groups, for the State Government, and for developers. His clients have included the Wakefield Regional Council, the City of Unley, developer George Diakos, and others.

== Early life ==
Brian Hayes was born as the eldest of 3 children in July 1944 in Bombay British India, during a turbulent period of history as the country was moving towards independence. His father Henry was an Anglo-Indian from Karachi, Sindh province, while his mother Joan came from a Portuguese-Indian family. Hayes' paternal family were mainly of Indian, Irish and English ancestry. Additionally, his paternal great-great grandmother, born in Mawlamyine, was Anglo-Burmese through her Burmese mother, who most likely a Shan or Pa'O woman. Hayes was raised in his father's native Karachi until 1947 when his family returned to Bombay. He boarded at St Joseph's School, Darjeeling in the Himalayas until the age of 11. In 1957 he and his family migrated to England upon the R.M.S. Strathnaver.

After completing his secondary education in England and qualifying as a legal practitioner, he migrated to Australia in 1971 under the Australian Government's Assisted Passage Migration Scheme. He currently resides in Adelaide, South Australia with his wife and has 3 children and 7 grandchildren.

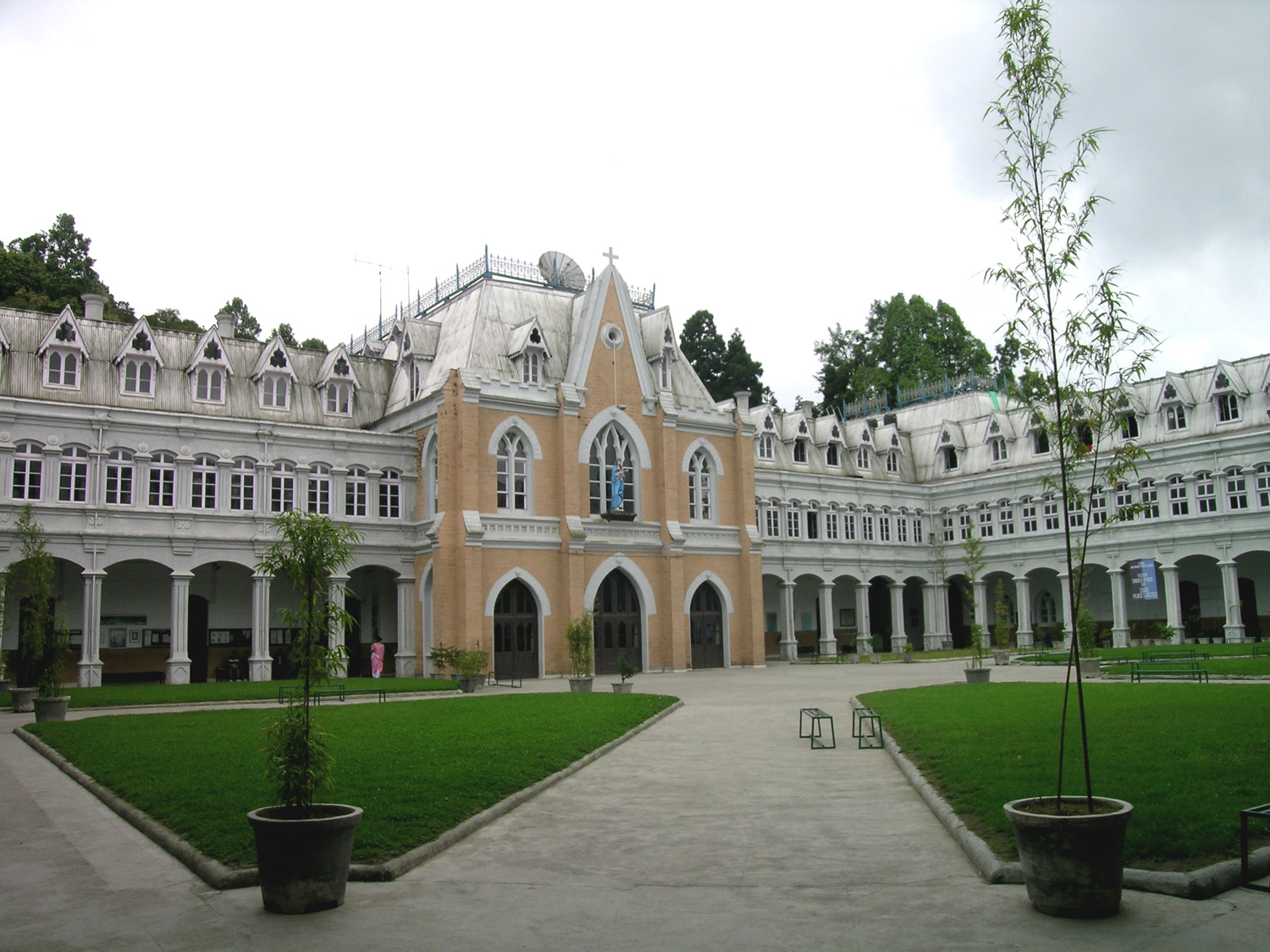
St Josephs School Darjeeling, India

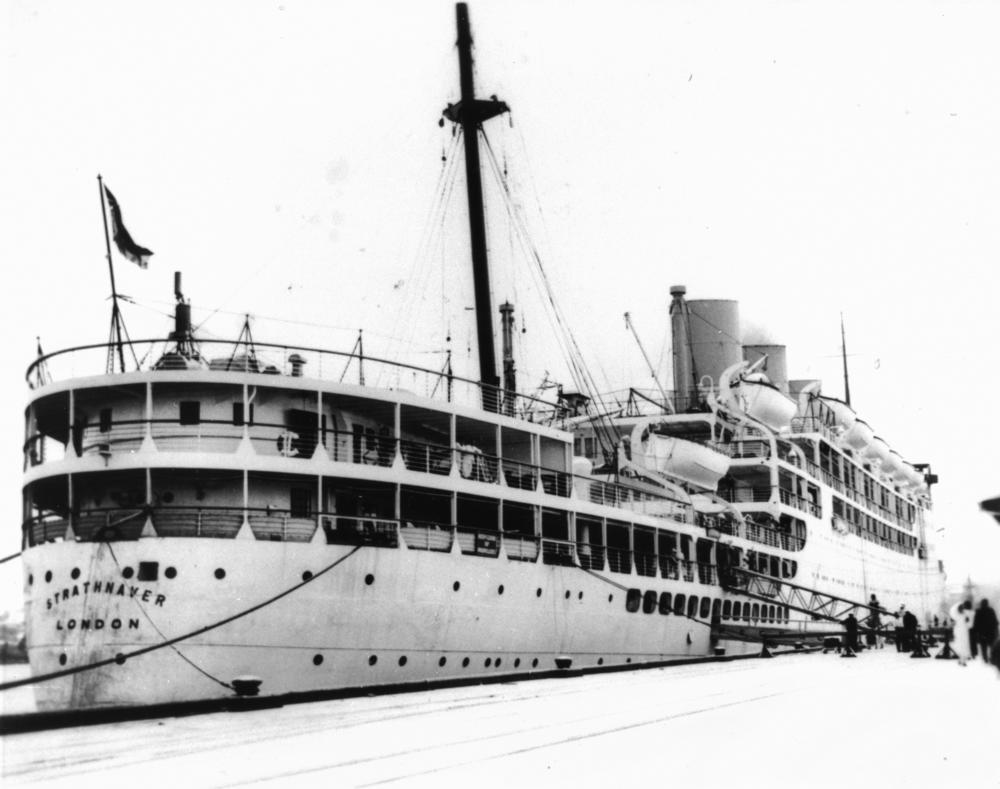
RMS Strathnaver

== Public service ==
=== Strategic advisor to India ===
He is a former National Chairman of the Australia India Business Council, and established its South Australian chapter in 2004. As National Chairman, he has chaired two Joint Business Council Meetings in Australia and India. Hayes first acted as a consultant advising the Government of South Australia on the state's relations with India in 2008 to develop bilateral trade and business between South Australia and India and to assist South Australian companies to export and import. Since his appointment, his work in the role has included leading six business delegations with the South Australian Premier and two Australian Federal Government trade delegations to India.

Members of the Liberal Party including Opposition leader Steven Marshall have criticised his ongoing appointment. Vincent Tarzia has described his remuneration as "outrageous" when compared to the average South Australian wage. In 2015, Hayes was receiving $120,000 annually to fulfill a part-time consultancy role. In 2012, Hayes' remuneration was greater than that received by a member of the South Australian parliament.

Hayes is also a Distinguished Fellow of the Australia India Institute, Australia's only national centre for research and analysis on India.

=== Planning reform ===
Hayes has been involved in planning review and reform processes in South Australia since the 1990s. In 2012, Hayes interviewed Premier Jay Weatherill about future planning reform at an event hosted by the Planning Institute of Australia, of which he is an Honorary Fellow. In February 2013 Hayes acted as Chair of South Australia's Expert Panel on Planning Reform and spokesperson for the panel and had some input into the appointment of its membership. He told ABC radio that the development legislation in South Australia was twenty years old and that a review was to be undertaken. He told journalist Ian Henschke that a revised planning system needs to be fair and meet the current expectations of communities. Hayes wrote of changing expectations of planning in South Australia that "people are looking for a planning system that is easy to understand and apply, that values community input, that includes clear rules and straightforward processes that ensures the right balance between statewide issues and local needs, and is based upon the most up-to-date expert knowledge." The Panel delivered its final report and recommendations in December 2014.

=== Board memberships ===
Hayes was a member of the board of the South Australian Tourism Commission from October 2011 until 2015. His academic board memberships include the University of South Australia Law School Advisory Board and the Advocacy and Justice Unit of the University of Adelaide. He is also a board member of the Independent Gaming Corporation Ltd, which was "established by the hotel and club industry to provide a secure, centralised computer monitoring facility for the management of gaming machines in hotels and clubs in South Australia."

== Filmography ==
According to the South Australian Film Corporation, Hayes has been active in the film industry for over seven years.

=== Co-producer, Hotel Mumbai ===
In 2018, Hayes was a co-producer of Hotel Mumbai, Australian director Anthony Maras' dramatic reconstruction of the 2008 terrorist attack on Mumbai's Taj Mahal Hotel. Hayes, who is patron of the Colaba fishing village where the gunmen first arrived, was involved in background research for the movie.

=== Producer, Emotion is Dead ===
Hayes also served as a producer of the indie film Emotion is Dead directed by Pete Williams. The movie details the story of a young talented skateboarder from a low socio-economic neighbourhood in South Australia who has grand ambitions to escape his working class background.

== Film board membership ==
In 2023, Hayes was appointed to the board of the South Australian Film Corporation, South Australia's main screen authority and investment body which aims to champion the screen business in South Australia. It has been in operation since 1972. Brian Hayes is also a member of the National Indian Film Festival of Australia's 2026 advisory council.
