= Secchi (lunar crater) =

Crater on the Moon

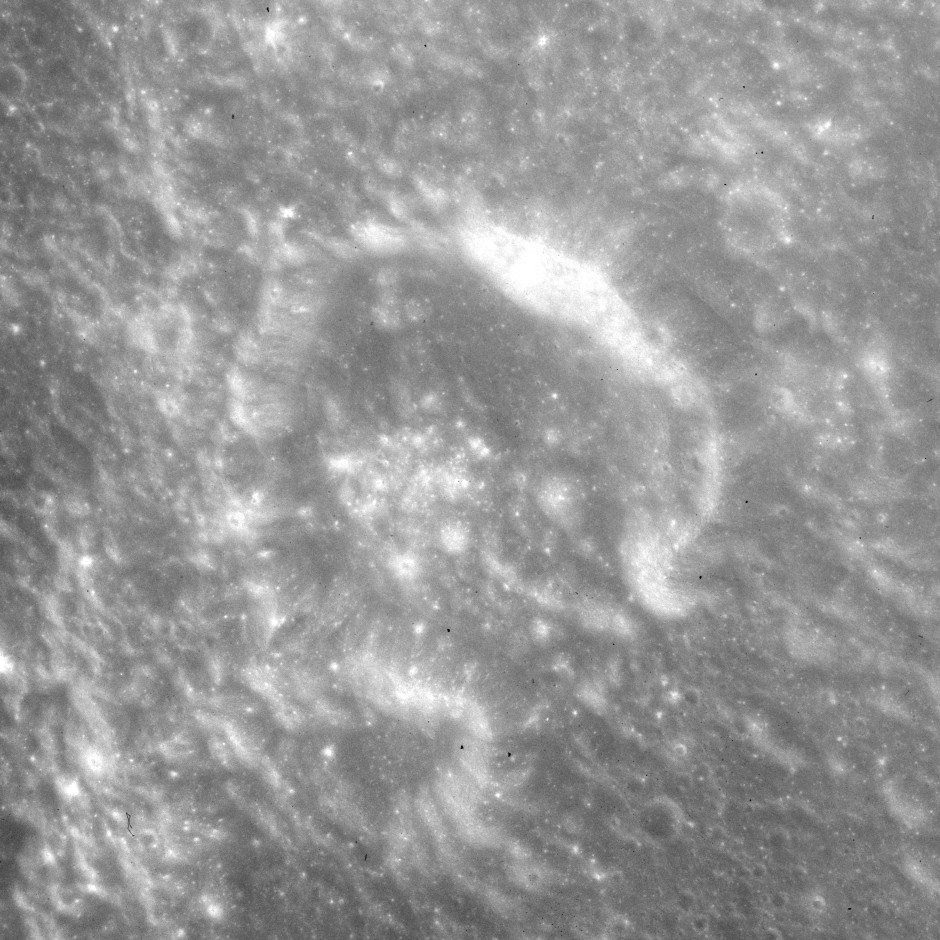
- Apollo 15 mapping camera image
- Coordinates: 2.4°N 43.5°E
- Diameter: 25 km
- Depth: 1.35 km
- Colongitude: 317° at sunrise
- Eponym: Angelo Secchi

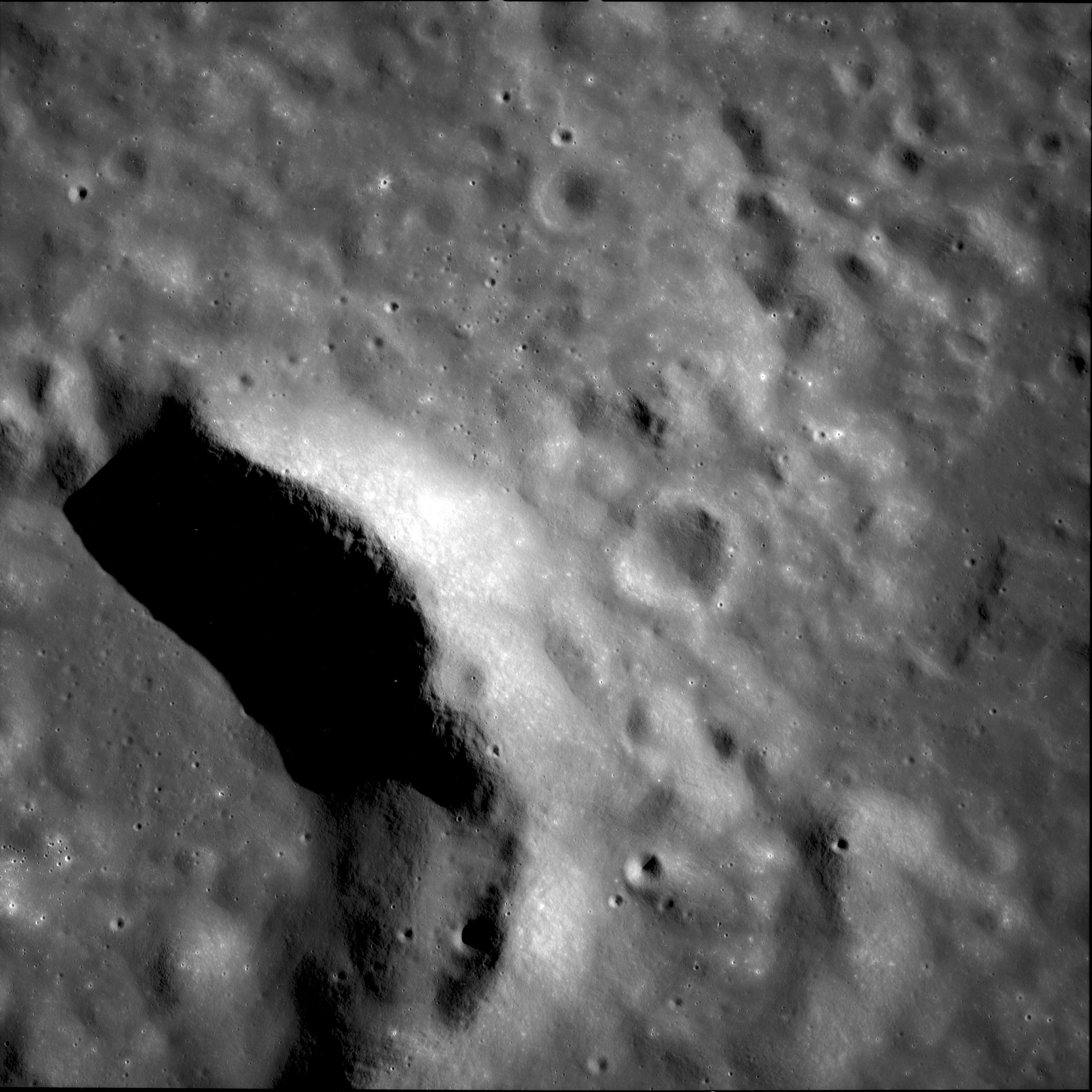
Northeastern Secchi at low sun angle, from Apollo 11

Secchi is a small lunar impact crater formation on the northwest edge of Mare Fecunditatis. It was named after the 19th-century Italian astronomer Angelo Secchi. To the northeast is the crater Taruntius. The western rim is joined with a section of the minor Montes Secchi range. The rim of this crater has been opened in the northern and southern ends, leaving two curved ridges facing each other across the crater floor. To the south is a pair of rilles designated the Rimae Secchi. These lie near the edge of the mare, and have a combined length of about 40 kilometers.

== Satellite craters ==
By convention these features are identified on lunar maps by placing the letter on the side of the crater midpoint that is closest to Secchi.

Secchi	Coordinates	Diameter
A	3.26°N 41.47°E	4.9 km
B	3.66°N 41.52°E	5.2 km
G	3.94°N 44.57°E	6.7 km
K	0.17°S 45.5°E	6.0 km
U	1.08°N 42.19°E	4.9 km
X	0.77°S 43.67°E	4.7 km

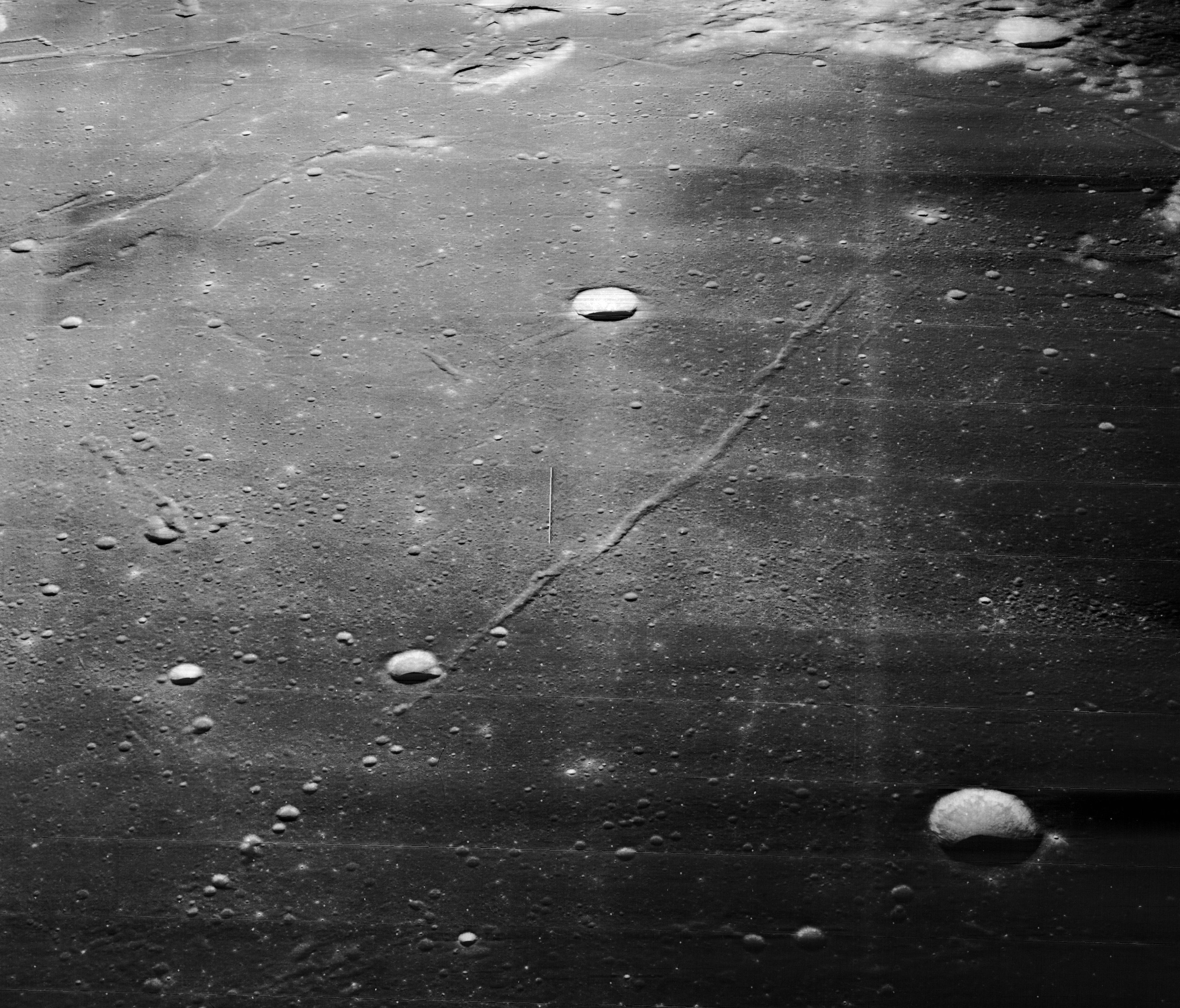
Oblique view of Rima Messier from Lunar Orbiter 5, also showing Secchi X above center and Secchi K at lower right

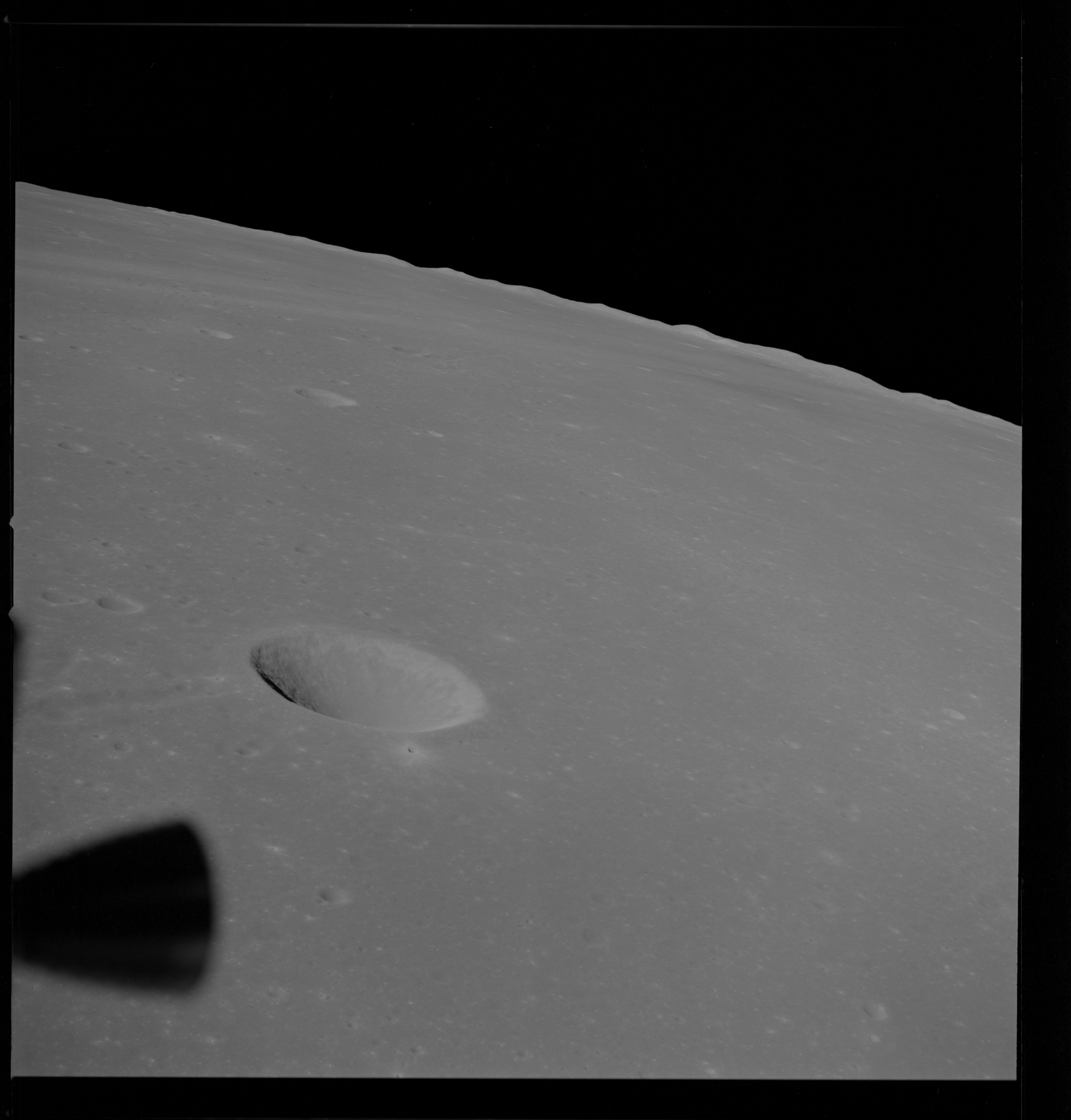
Oblique view of Secchi K satellite crater by Apollo 10. The double ray of Messier A crater is visible in the upper left.

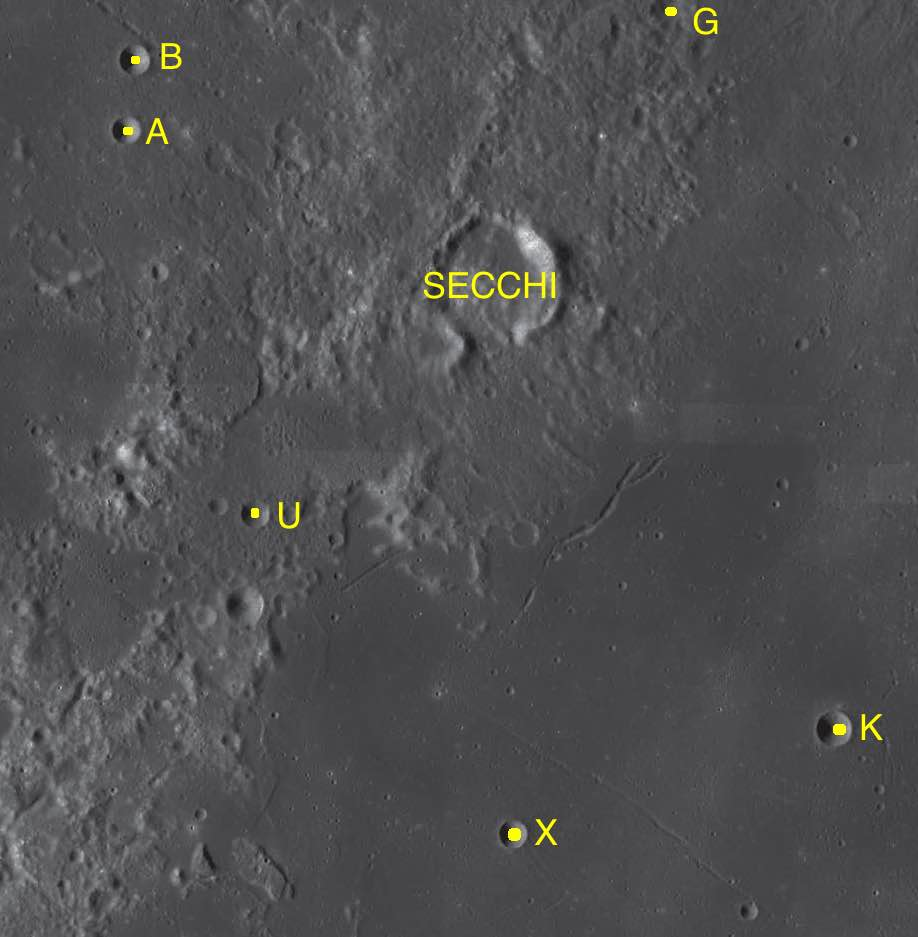
Satellite craters of Secchi
