= Henri Depelchin =

Belgian Jesuit priest and missionary in India and Africa

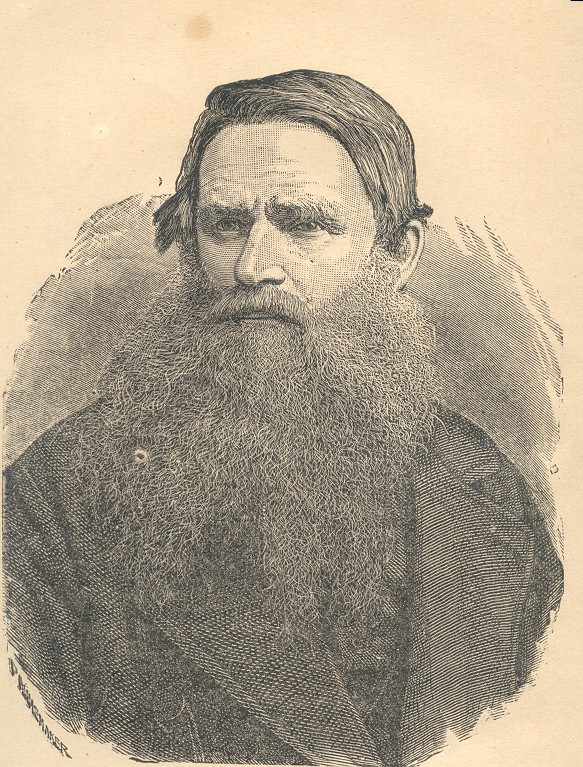
Henri Depelchin, S.J.

Henri Joseph Depelchin, SJ (also Henry Depelchin) (24 January 1822, Russeignies, East Flanders, Netherlands – 26 May 1900, Calcutta, District of West Bengal, British India), was a Belgian Jesuit priest and missionary in India and Africa. As a missionary, he was the first superior of the failed Zambesi Mission in Africa and the founder and first superior of the West Bengal Mission in India. As an educator, he was the founder and first director of three major colleges in India.

== Life ==
Depelchin's biographies show 24 January 1822 as the date of his birth but the civil registers of Russignies show that Henri Joseph Depelchin was actually born on 28 January 1822. He was the son of Almable François Joseph Depelchin, the innkeeper, and his wife, Marie Anne Matroye. At that time, his birthplace, Russignies, a farming village near Renaix, was a part of the United Kingdom of the Netherlands, in the province of East Flanders but today it is a part of the city of Mont-de-l'Enclus in the province of Hainaut in the Kingdom of Belgium.

On 25 September 1842, he was admitted to the Society of Jesus at the former Norbertine Abbey of Tronchiennes (now Drongen) for the novitiate. After taking his first vows in 1844, he spent the next five years in his Juniorate teaching in Jesuit schools in Tournai and Aalst. Then he studied philosophy at the University of Namur (1849–1851) and theology at the Catholic University of Louvain (1851–1854). On 14 September 1854, in Liège, he was ordained as a priest.

Afterwards, Depelchin spent the following year in his Third Year, the final stage of the Jesuit formation. Then he was sent to Antwerp and Namur to teach in the Jesuit schools and to serve as a superior. It seemed that he was destined to spend his life in education. Belgium had just been freed from the Kingdom of the Netherlands and the Catholic Church was now free to celebrate Mass and teach catechism in peace. As a result, the Jesuits were opening new schools across the new Kingdom of Belgium.

== Missionary years ==
In 1859, a call for help came out of British India, from the Vicar Apostolic of the West Bengal. The Catholics of Calcutta had sent their request to Pope Pius IX for a Jesuit college to be established in their city for the natives. He, in turn, asked the then Superior General of the Society of Jesus, Peter Jan Beckx, for the help. Te Superior General(a native of Belgium), in turn, chose the Jesuit Province of Belgium to supply the men for the mission.

=== Calcutta ===
Father Depelchin, then 37, was one of the men who was asked to come to India and help. He accepted, and he was appointed as the Superior of the new Mission. He and his group sailed from Antwerp and arrived at Calcutta on 29 November 1859. They, along with the local Catholics, immediately set to gather the funds and build the new school. 12 days later, Depelchin announced in the newspapers that College of St. Francis Xavier would be opening on 6 January 1860. A prospectus had already been published and distributed. Designed by a Brother Koppes, S.J., the school opened eight days later than planned, with Father Jean Devos, S.J., as its first Rector.

By that time, Depelchin had become so ill with cholera that he was not expected to live. However, he recovered in time. During his period of convalescence, he served as the military chaplain of the British troops at Fort William in Calcutta. He also served as the Rector of St. Xavier's College from 1864 to 1871. During these years, the enrolment of the college grew from 100 students to 500. To develop the science curriculum of the college, Depelchin recruited a young Belgian Jesuit priest, Eugène Lafont, S.J., the future leading figure in the scientific community of India.

=== Bombay ===
After brief stints as a pastor in Midnapore (1871–1872) and Poona (1872–1873), in 1873, Depelchin was sent by the Superior General to Bombay (now Mumbai) to answer the appeal for help from the Apostolic Vicar of Bombay, Leo Meurin, S.J. Meurin had grouped four little school, including a seminary, to form a Catholic institution worthy of the growing power and prestige of the new metropolis of western India. Henri felt they needed a dynamic and experienced Rector. Thus, he asked the Superior General, Pierre Beckx, who promptly sent Depelchin. Under his administration, the new school became St. Xavier's College of Bombay. He also lectured in philosophy, exegesis, dogmatics and Church history at the college's seminary. When he finally left, a local columnist commented, "Father Depelchin left the Bombay Saint Xavier's in even a more prosperous state than the St Xavier's of Calcutta."

=== Zambezia ===
In 1878 Depelchin was recalled to Europe by Beckx, who assigned him to organise and head the Zambesi Mission in southeastern Africa. The Mission was to cover, in today's maps, all of Zimbabwe, most of Zambia and some of Mozambique. At that time, very few Europeans knew anything about that part of Africa. But finding funds and volunteers were not a problem. In 1879, Depelchin sailed for Cape Town in the Cape Colony with an international team of five other priests and five lay brothers from various Jesuit provinces. They then went to the Zambezia bush to establish a mission base in Bulawayo in Matabeleland (now western Zimbabwe). The journey took almost six months. It was the first of three successive expeditions, taken between 1879 and 1882, Each of them began in the town of Grahamstown (about 70 kilometres (43 mi) from the coast), also in the Cape Colony, and involved hundreds of miles (kilometers) in ox-carts in a painful climate and through a hostile environment. The goal was always the same – to ask the natives for the permission to open a mission station in their land. Each time, they said no, and Depelchin and his men were dogged by misfortunes, trails, diseases, accidents and even probably poison. His letters sent "from the lands of the Matabeles", "in the huts of the Batongas" and from "the valley of the Barotses", were published in Brussels as a two-volume set in 1882 and 1883. Under the title of Trois ans dans l'Afrique australe [Three Years in Southern Africa], the collection was an immediate best-seller, drawing more missionary vocations to the Church.

In the end, the Zambesi Mission was a fiasco. It was cancelled in April 1883 by the superiors of the orders of the surviving missionaries. Ten missionaries, aged between 29 and 50, lost their lives. Depelchin himself was out with a broken leg from an ox-wagon accident.

Depelchin was recalled to Belgium in 1883 to regain his health and to allow his leg to heal. It took him four years to completely recover. He was assigned light duties at the schools in Aalst and Mons but his heart was still in the missions. So he went to the local parishes to speak about life in the missions, to encourage financial support for them and to recruit future missionaries. Like his books, his appearances were popular and successful. His letters and reports from India were also presented in numerous missionary periodicals in Europe.

=== Darjeeling ===
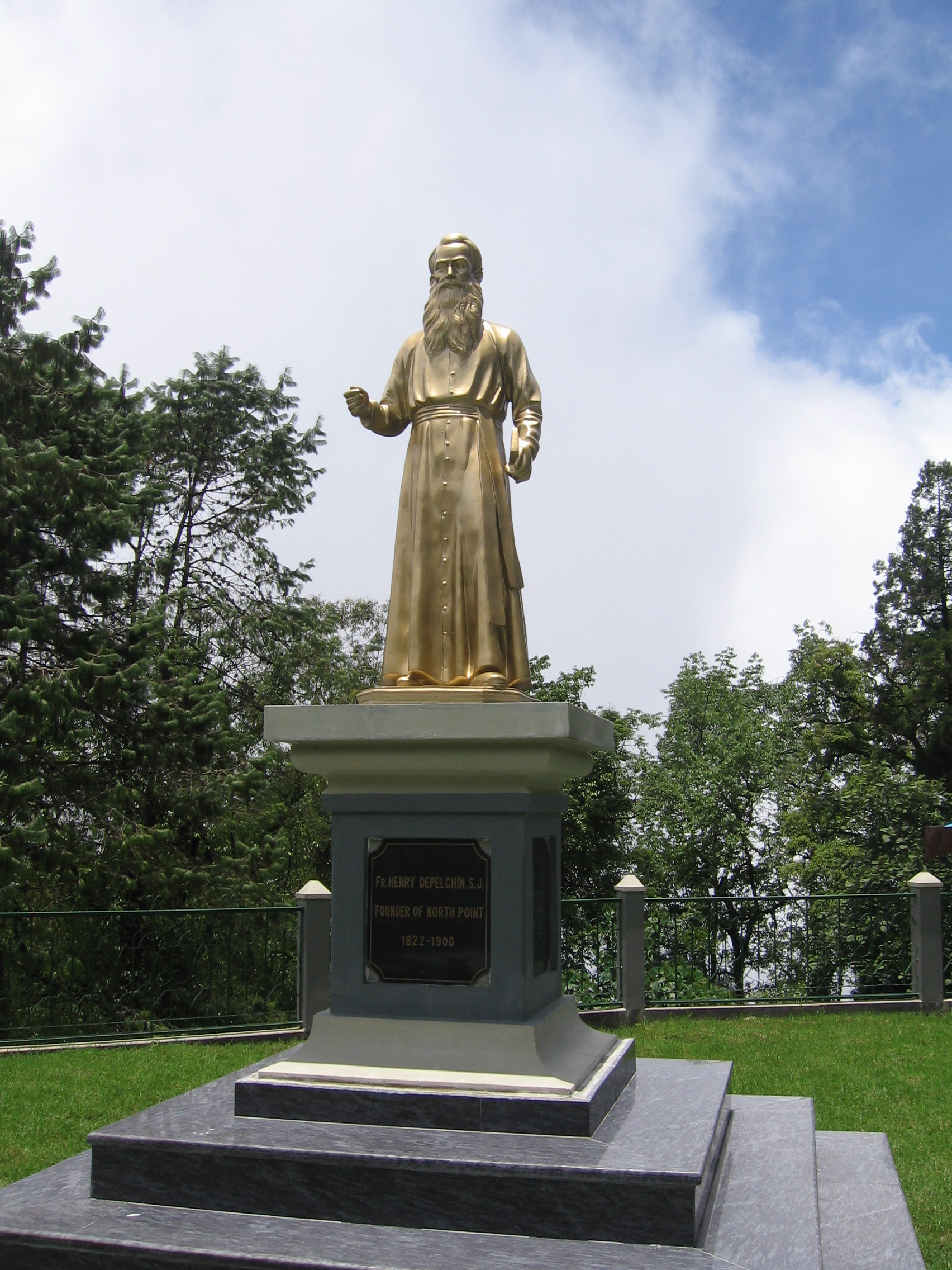
Statue of Henri Depelchin on the grounds of St. Joseph's School in Darjeeling

In 1887 Depelchin was sent back to India. This time, his mission was the establishment of a high school in Darjeeling, a town in the foothills in the Himalayas in the North Bengal. He was already 67 years old. With characteristic punctuality and efficiency, he began on 10 January 1888, the day he arrived in Darjeeling – and only six days after he came to Calcutta from Antwerp. He found a bungalow to temporarily house the new school in a place called Sunny Banks and it opened on 13 February with the name of St. Joseph's School. The first class had 25 students, with Father Depelchin as their first Rector. He also served as the pastor for the town.

Depelchin wanted newer, bigger and better buildings for his new school. To get them, he had to find land for the construction so he went out in search of it. In spite of apparently insurmountable obstacles, he used his powers of persuasion, sheer audacity and innate tact to find it at a place called "North Point" outside Darjeeling. The land was levelled and the largest of the buildings was finished in four years. The primary designer was Brother Eugène Rotsaert, S.J. Most of the costs were covered by Belgian benefactors as well as members of the Anglo-Indian Catholic community, and even the civil authorities. The new building was blessed on 8 December 1891 by Depelchin himself. Classes began there in February 1892 but with a new Rector – Alfred Neut.

== Last years ==
At the age of 69, already known as the "Grand Old Man", Depelchin had been sent up the hills to Kurseong, where he was given the task of forming young Jesuit missionaries who were studying philosophy there. He also lectured them on logic and metaphysics. in 1894, he was transferred to Ranchi, where he was named in 1896 an instructor to the Third Years. In the meantime, His letters and reports from India continued to be in numerous missionary periodicals across Europe.

Unfortunately, Depelchin's health was finally going into decline. In 1898 he was given an easier position in the parish of Serampore. But, in December 1899, he was sent to Calcutta to stay at the Archbishop's House, where he died a few months later, at the age of 78, on 26 May 1900.

== Works ==
- Trois ans dans l'Afrique Australe: le pays des Matabélés, débuts de la mission du Zambèse.
- Trois ans dans l'Afrique australe: débuts de la mission du Zambèse. Lettres des pères H. Depelchin et Ch. Croonenberghs, Volume 2.
- The Jesuit mission of the Zambesi: Letters from the Missionaries.
- Journeys beyond Gubuluwayo, to the Gaza, Tonga and Lozi: letters of the Jesuits' Zambesi Mission,1880–1883.
- Journey to Gubuluwayo: letters of Frs. H. Depelchin and C. Croonenberghs, S.J.

== See also ==
- Eugène Lafont
- St. Joseph's College (School Department)
- St. Joseph's School, Darjeeling
- University College of India
- St. Vincent's High School
