= Apostolic Prefecture of Zambesia =

The Zambesi Mission was a Catholic prefecture division in Rhodesia.

== Location ==
The prefecture comprised all Rhodesia south of the Zambesi River, that part of Bechuanaland which is north of the Tropic of Capricorn and east of the 22nd degree of longitude, that part of Rhodesia north of the Zambesi, south of the Congo Free State, and west of the 30th degree longitude. Originally it also included a part of North-eastern Rhodesia, which was split off into the Vicariate Apostolic of Nyassa.

Rhodesia was administered by the British South Africa Company from 1890 onwards.

=== Establishment ===
The Zambesi mission was founded in 1877, and entrusted to the English Province of the Society of Jesus; its limits were defined by Propaganda in 1879. In 1879 the first party of missionaries under Henri Depelchin, the first superior, started from Grahamstown, Cape Colony by oxen drawn wagon to Bulawayo. The thousand mile journey took five or six months.

The first years were difficult. Due to the lack of efficient transport, prices were very high which meant that many lives were lost from fever and privations. The Matabele were at the time hostile to Christianity, with their king, Lobengula, playing a crucial part in opposing the mission.

There were unsuccessful expeditions from the base in Bulawayo, one led by Depelchin to the north beyond the Zambesi and one led by Augustus Law went 300 miles east to the Portuguese border.

=== Under the British South Africa Company ===
In 1893 Lobengula was overthrown when Bulawayo and Matabeleland were seized by the British South Africa Company. A number of other Catholic missionaries entered the new territory with the Sisters of St. Dominic starting public hospitals, and later opening schools for the children of the settlers.

The progress of the mission was slow, with the adult population still attached to animism and polygamy. The missions concentrated on providing education although this was hampered by a number of physical difficulties, although the introduction of railways meant that more mission stations could be established.

As well as the Jesuits and the Sisters of St. Dominic the other Catholic missionaries included the Missionaries of Mariannhill, the Sisters of Notre Dame and the Sisters of the Precious Blood.
