= Jagabandhu Bose =

Indian physician and university professor

- Born: Jagabandhu Bose; April 1831
- Education: Dhaka College; Calcutta Medical College

Dr. Jagabandhu Bose was a medical doctor and philanthropist of Bengal.

== Education ==
Bose began his studies at Dhaka College, and later moved to Calcutta Medical College in 1851 to pursue his undergraduate medical studies. He received the Goodeve Medal for his outstanding dissection work in his first year at the school, and was subsequently appointed prosector under Dr. Alen Web. During his university career, he received numerous honours and awards, including honours in anatomy and botany in his second year, gold medals in Pharmacology and Chemistry in his third year, and a gold medal in Medicine and the Goodeve Medal in Obstetrics in his fourth year. He graduated with his medical degree from Calcutta University in 1863.

== Career ==
Bose served for seven years as Second Practical Teacher under Dr. H. Walker at Calcutta Medical College. He then taught cadaver dissection in the Bengali medium for six years. Later, he was appointed as a teacher of pharmacology, a position he held for 12 years.

== Calcutta Medical School ==
In 1886, Bose was one of the founders of R. G. Kar Medical College and Hospital, and he served as its first president and Professor of pharmacology. He advocated for government permission to allow his students conduct cadaver dissection.

== College of Physicians and Surgeons of Bengal ==
In 1895, Bose co-founded the College of Physicians and Surgeons of Bengal, and served as its inaugural president.

Additionally, the renowned "Dactar Barir Puja" Durga Puja, established by his family in Dandirhat village under the Basirhat subdivision in North 24, Parganas, continues to be celebrated to this day.
