= T. C. Rao =

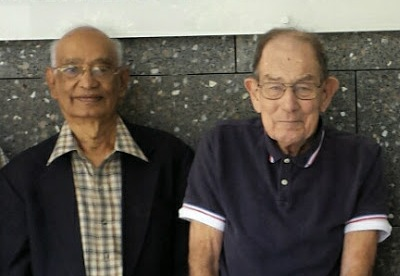
Prof T C Rao with Prof A J Lynch

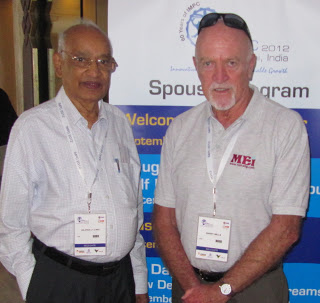
Prof. T.C. Rao with Dr. B.A. Wills Editor in Chief of Minerals Engineering during XXVI International Mineral Processing Congress held in New Delhi, India, in 2012.

Tadimety Chakrapani Rao (18 September 1940 – 5 September 2023), also known as T.C. Rao, is an Indian mineral processing scientist and researcher.

== Education ==
In 1959, Rao received a Bachelor of Science with honours in geology from Andhra University in Waltair, India, with a Masters in Science in ore dressing from the university in 1960. This course in ore dressing began at Andhra University under the guidance of Professor Calamur Mahadevan in 1954, and at that time was the only course in mineral processing in India. In 1965, under the guidance of Professors Frank T. M. White and Alban J. Lynch, Rao completed a postdoctorate in mineral engineering from the University of Queensland, Australia.

== Career ==
From 1967 to 1977, Rao was a lecturer and then assistant professor at the Indian Institute of Technology, Kanpur. From 1977 to 1989 he was initially head of the fuel and mineral engineering department and was then appointed Dean of Research and Development at Indian School of Mines, Dhanbad. From 1989 to 2000, he was director of the Advanced Minerals and Process Research Institute.

He is a member of the general council of the Indian Institute of Technology (Indian School of Mines), Dhanbad.

He is a Council Member of the Indian Institute of Metals and the Mining, Geological and Metallurgical Institute of India. He is an Executive Council Member of Indian Institute of Mineral Engineering. He was honoured as a fellow of Indian National Academy of Engineers in Coal and Mineral Processing Specialization.

== Honours and awards ==
- National Mineral Award Govt. of India, 1978
- Indranil Award, Mining Geological & Metallurgical Institute of India (MGMI), 1983
- National Metallurgist's Day Award, Govt. of India in 1985, for the work carried out in coal washeries, industrial hydrocyclones and comminution circuits.
- Pandit Lajja Shankar Jha, Award, Govt. of Madhya Pradesh, 1990
- Mining Engineering Design Award, The Institution of Engineers (I), 1987
- IIME (Indian Institute of Mineral Engineers) Coal Beneficiation Award, 1998.
- Distinguished Scientist Award, Madhya Pradesh Council of Science and Technology, 2000.
- Basant Samman Award, 2007 .
- Coal Preparation Innovation Award, Coal Preparation Society of India - 2013
- Australian Alumni Award-2015, for Outstanding Achievement in Science &Technology by Australian Alumni Association –India- 2015.
- At the XVII International Seminar on Mineral Processing Technology (MPT-2018) on 10 October 2018, Prof. Rao was conferred the honour of "Father of (Indian) Mineral Engineering". The citation read "In recognition and appreciation of immense contributions to the mineral and coal processing education, research and industry in an illustrious career... ".
