= Regency (Jesuit) =

The regency is a period lasting two to three years during the formation of a candidate to the Society of Jesus following his initial admission to the Society during the two years of novitiate. During this time, the men are expected to be fully involved in the apostolic work and community life of the Society.

Men are assigned to either two or three years of regency, depending on their age, the apostolic needs of the Provinces of the Society, and the individual apostolic desires of the candidate. The experience of the Society is that about 50% of the men are assigned to high schools and 30% to universities, while the other 20% work in social and pastoral ministries.

== See also ==
- Jesuit formation
