= Angelo Secchi =

Italian priest and scientist (1818–1878)

The Reverend Father Angelo Secchi S.J.
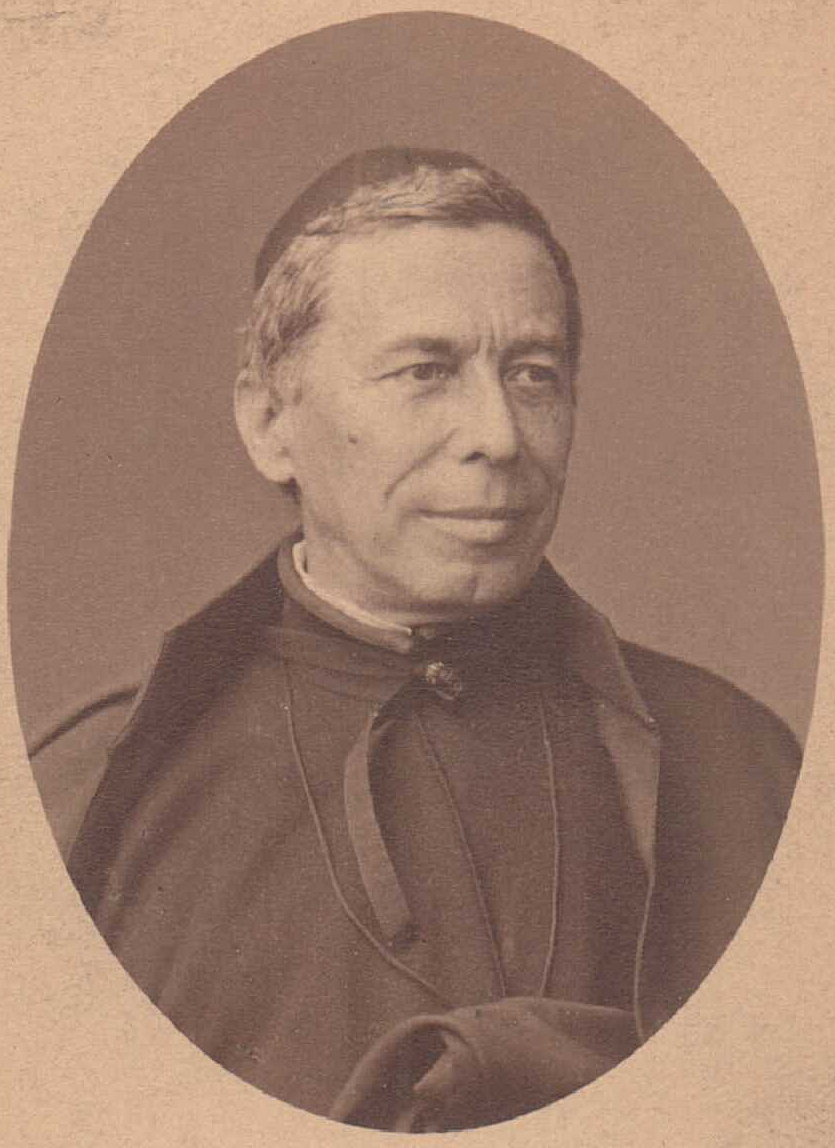
- Church: Latin Church

Orders
- Ordination: 12 September 1847
- Rank: Priest

Personal details
- Born: 28 June 1818 Reggio Emilia, Duchy of Modena and Reggio
- Died: 26 February 1878 (aged 59) Rome, Kingdom of Italy
- Denomination: Catholicism
- Scientific career
- Awards: Légion d'honneur, France
- Fields: Astronomy
- Workplaces: Observatory of the Roman College

Signature
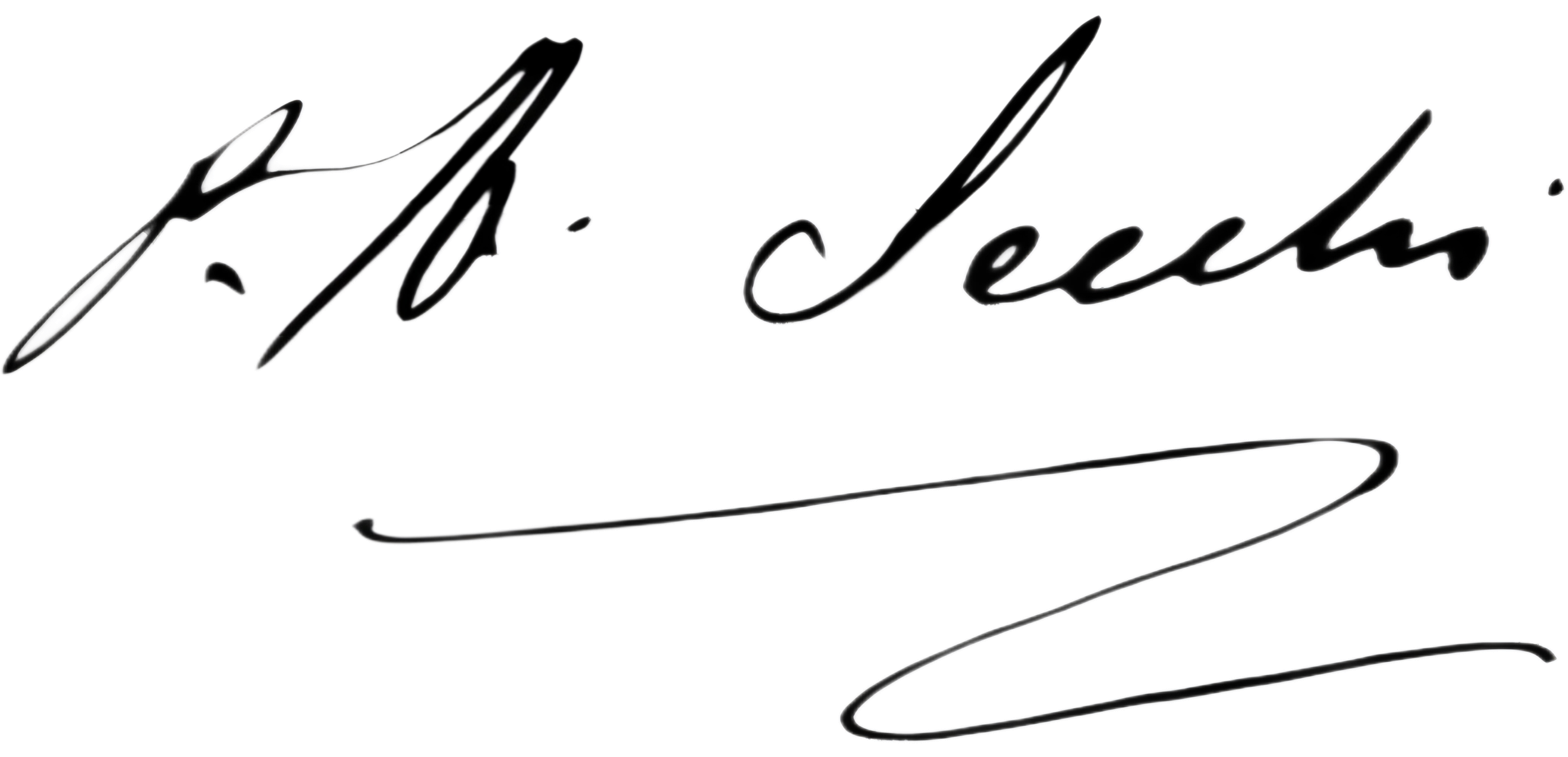

Angelo Secchi S.J. (Italian pronunciation: [ˈandʒelo ˈsekki]; 28 June 1818 – 26 February 1878) was an Italian Catholic priest and astronomer from the Italian region of Emilia. He was director of the observatory at the Pontifical Gregorian University (then called the Roman College) for 28 years. He was a pioneer in astronomical spectroscopy, and was one of the first scientists to state authoritatively that the Sun is a star.

== Biography ==
Secchi was born in Reggio Emilia, where he studied at the Jesuit gymnasium. At the age of 16, he entered the Jesuit Order in Rome. He continued his studies at the Roman College and demonstrated great scientific ability. In 1839, he was appointed tutor of mathematics and physics at the college. In 1841, he became professor of physics at the Jesuit College in Loreto. In 1844, he began theological studies in Rome, and was ordained a priest on 12 September 1847. In 1848, due to the Roman Revolution, the Jesuits were ordered to leave Rome. Secchi spent the next two years in the United Kingdom at Stonyhurst College, where he met Alfred Weld, the Jesuit astronomer in charge of the Stonyhurst Observatory, who may have inspired him to take up the science. He moved on to the United States, where he taught for a time at Georgetown University in Washington, D.C.. He also took his doctoral examination in theology there.

During his stay in America, he met Commander Matthew Fontaine Maury, the first director of the United States Naval Observatory in Washington. He studied with Maury and corresponded with him for many years.

He returned to Rome in 1850. On the recommendation of his late colleague Francesco de Vico, he became head of the observatory of the college at age 32. In 1853, under his direction, the crumbling observatory was relocated to a new facility on top of the Sant'Ignazio Church (the chapel of the college). Secchi served as director until his death.

Secchi was elected to the American Philosophical Society in 1860.

His director position was challenged after 1870, when the remnant of the Papal States around Rome was taken over by the Kingdom of Italy. In 1873, the college was declared property of the Italian government. When the government moved to take over the observatory as well, Secchi protested vigorously and threatened to leave the observatory for one of several positions offered to him by foreign observatories. He was offered important scientific positions and political dignities by the government, but refused to pledge allegiance to the Kingdom in place of the Pope. The royal government did not dare to interfere with him, and he continued as director.

He died in 1878 at age 59, in Rome.

== Astronomical works ==
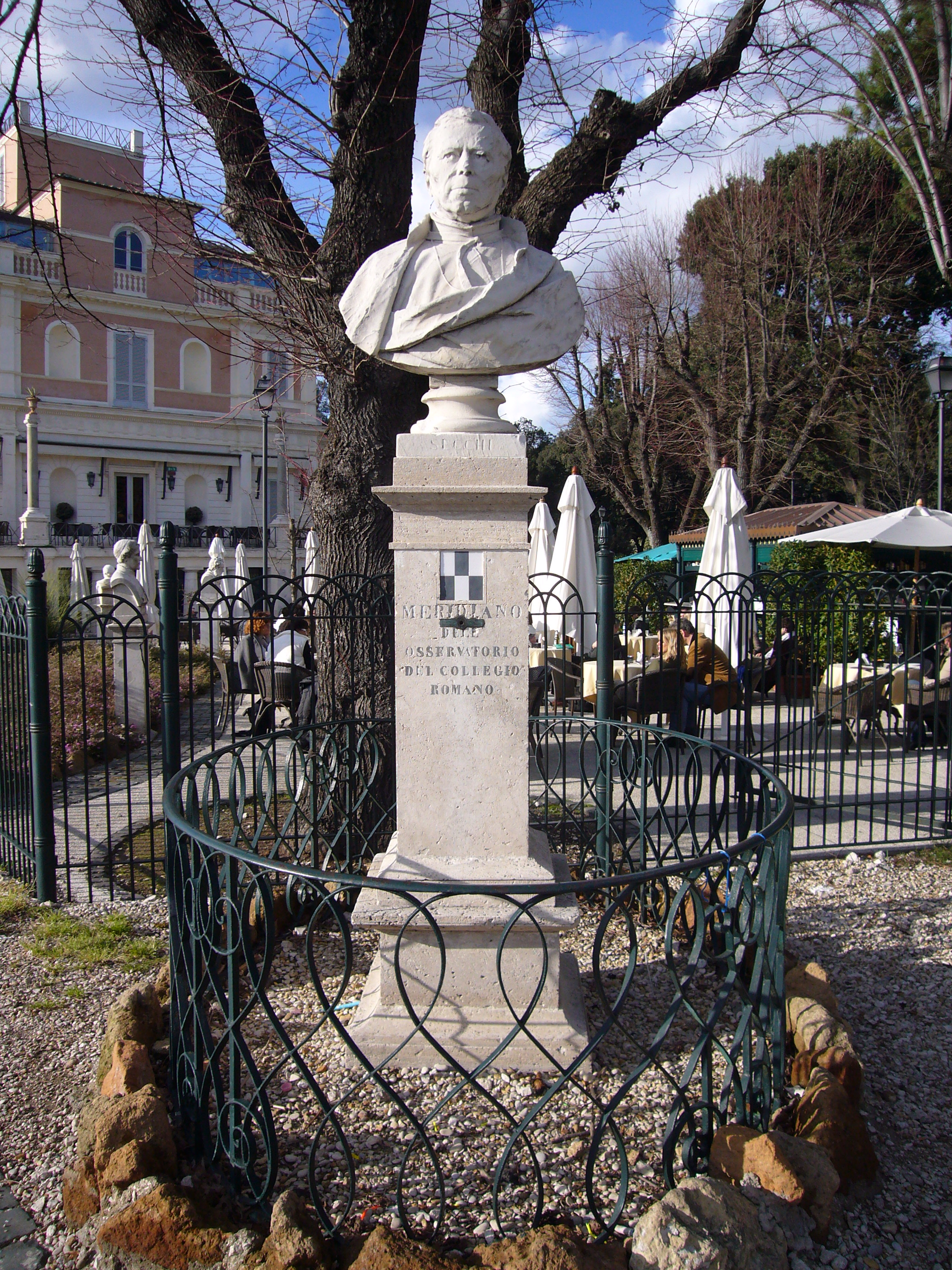
bust by Giuseppe Prinzi at Pincio, Rome

Secchi made contributions to many areas of astronomy.

- He revised Friedrich Georg Wilhelm von Struve's catalog of double stars, compiling data for over 10,000 binaries.
- He discovered three comets, including Comet Secchi.
- He produced an exact map of the lunar crater Copernicus.
- He drew some of the first color illustrations of Mars and was the first to describe "channels" (canali in Italian) on the planetary surface.
- The first star recognized as a Be star was Gamma Cassiopeiae, which Secchi observed in 1866; the first star ever observed with emission lines.

Secchi was especially interested in the Sun, which he observed continually throughout his career.

- He observed and made drawings of solar eruptions and sunspots, and compiled records of sunspot activity.
- In 1860 and 1870, he organised expeditions to observe solar eclipses.
- He proved that the solar corona and coronal prominences observed during a solar eclipse were part of the Sun, and not artefacts of the eclipse.
- He discovered solar spicules.

However, his main area of interest was astronomical spectroscopy. He invented the heliospectrograph, star spectrograph, and telespectroscope. He showed that certain absorption lines in the spectrum of the Sun were caused by absorption in the Earth's atmosphere.

Starting in 1863, he began collecting the spectra of stars, accumulating some 4,000 stellar spectrograms. Through analysis of this data, he discovered that the stars come in a limited number of distinct types and subtypes, which could be distinguished by their different spectral patterns. From this concept, he developed the first system of stellar classification: the five Secchi classes. While his system was superseded by the Harvard system, he still stands as the discoverer of the principle of stellar classification, which is a fundamental element of astrophysics. His recognition of molecular bands of carbon radicals in the spectra of some stars made him the discoverer of carbon stars, which became one of his spectral classes.

== Other scientific and technical work ==
Secchi was active in oceanography, meteorology, and physics, as well as astronomy.

He invented the Secchi disk, which is used to measure water transparency in oceans, lakes and fish farms. He studied the climate of Rome and invented a "Meteorograph" for the convenient recording of several categories of weather data. He also studied the aurora borealis, the effects of lightning, and the cause of hail. He organised the systematic monitoring of the Earth's magnetic field, and in 1858 established a magnetic observatory in Rome.

Secchi also performed related technical works for the Papal government, such as overseeing placement of sundials and repair or installation of municipal water systems. In 1854–1855, he supervised an exact survey of the Appian Way in Rome. This survey was later used in the topographic mapping of Italy. He supervised the construction of lighthouses for the ports of the Papal States. In 1858, he travelled to France and Germany to procure the necessary projection lenses.

== Legacy ==
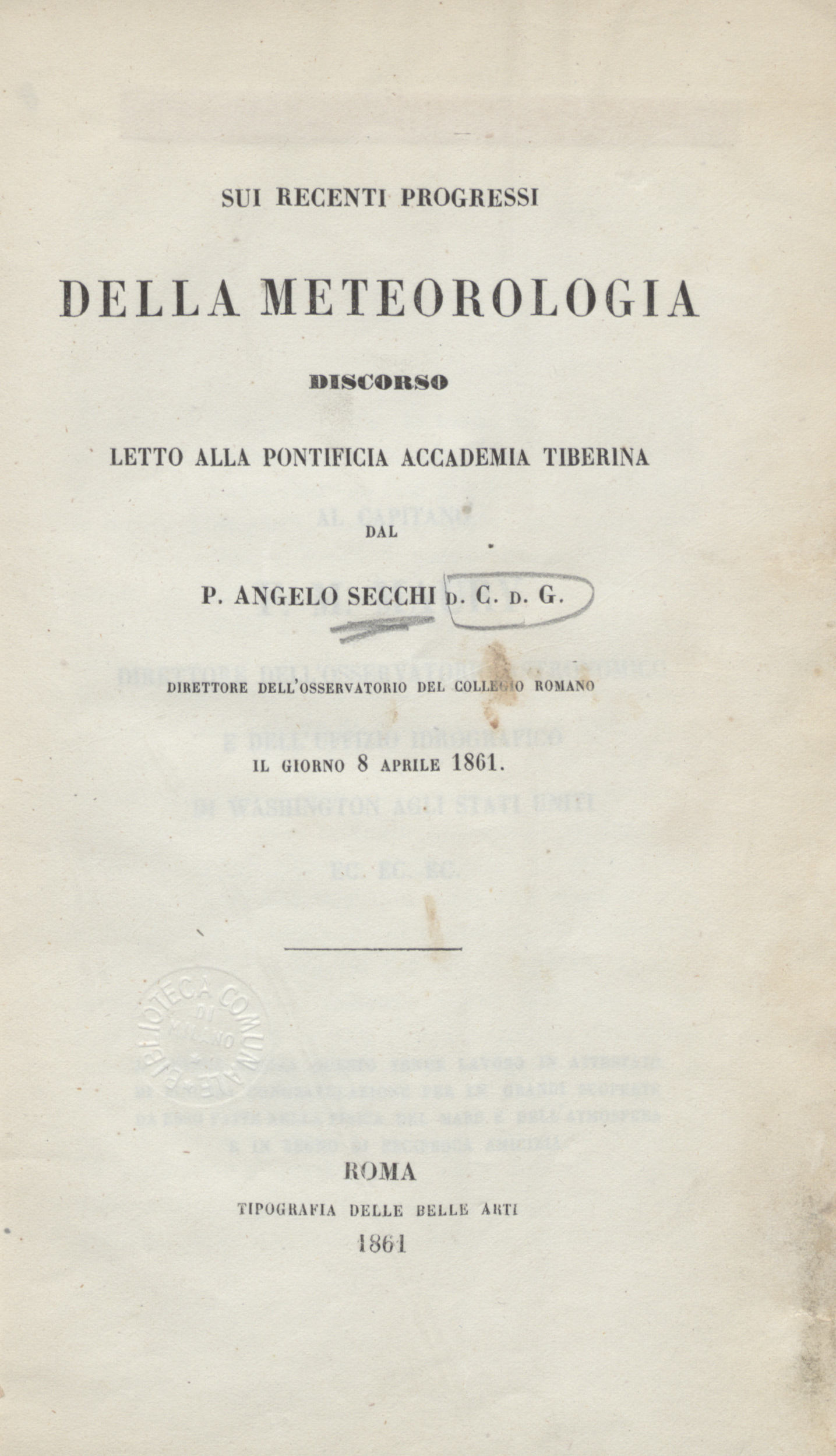
Sui recenti progressi della meteorologia (1861)

The lunar crater Secchi and the Martian crater Secchi are both named after him, as is the main-belt asteroid 4705 Secchi.

The two STEREO (Solar TErrestrial RElations Observatory) spacecraft each carry an instrument package called SECCHI (Sun Earth Connection Coronal and Heliospheric Investigation).

== See also ==
- List of Jesuit scientists
- List of Roman Catholic scientist-clerics

== Works (incomplete) ==
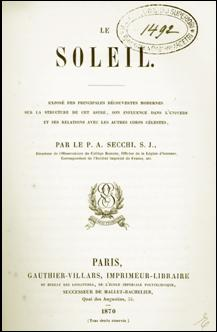
Le Soleil: Exposé des Principales Découvertes Modernes (The Sun: Presentation of the Major Modern Discoveries). Cover.

During his career, Fr. Secchi published about 730 papers in scientific journals. He also published a number of books.

- Misura Della Base Trigonometriea Eseguita Sulla Via Appia (Measurement of the Trigonometric Base Performed On the Via Appia). Rome: Tipografia della Reveranda Camera Apostolica. 1858.
- Il Quadro Fisico del Sistema Solare Secondo le Piu Recenti Osservazioni (The Physical Framework of the Solar System According to the Most Recent Observations). Rome: Tipografia delle Belle Arti. 1859.
- Secchi, Angelo (1861). Sui recenti progressi della meteorologia. Roma: Tipografia delle Belle Arti.
- Sulla Unitá delle Forze Fisiche (On the Unity of Physical Forces). Rome: Tipografia Forense. 1864.
- Unità delle forze fisiche (in Italian). Roma: Tipografia Forense. 1864.
- Le Soleil: Exposé des Principales Découvertes Modernes (The Sun: Presentation of the Major Modern Discoveries). Paris: Gauthier-Villars. 1870.
- Secchi, Angelo (1871). Rapporto della commissione per la misura del meridiano centrale europeo negli Stati Pontifici. Roma: Tip. delle scienze matematiche e fisiche.
- Stelle (in Italian). Milano: Dumolard. 1877.
- Lezioni elementari di fisica terrestre (in Italian). Torino: Loescher. 1879.

== Sources ==
- Maffeo, Fr. Sabino (SJ) (1991). In the Service of Nine Popes: 100 Years of the Vatican Observatory. trans. Fr. George Coyne, SJ. Città del Vaticano (Vatican City): Specola Vaticana. ISBN 88-7761-046-8.
- Hentschel, Klaus (2002). Mapping the Spectrum. Techniques of Visual Representation in research and Teaching. Oxford: Oxford Univ. Press. ISBN 9780198509530.
- Chinnici, Ileana; Gargano, Mauro, eds. (2018). "Tra cielo e Terra: L'avventura scientifica di Angelo Secchi". Roma: Comitato Nazionale per il Bicentenario della Nascita di Angelo Secchi. Archived from the original on 26 May 2019.
- Chinnici, Ileana (2019). Decoding the Stars: A Biography of Angelo Secchi, Jesuit and Scientist. Leiden/Boston: Brill. ISBN 9789004387331.
