= List of Old Stonyhursts =

This article lists notable former pupils of Stonyhurst College in Lancashire, England, and its lineal antecedents at St Omer, Bruges and Liège. Former pupils are referred to in school contexts as O.S. (Old Stonyhurst). Inter alia the school counts among its most distinguished former pupils: three Saints, twelve Beati, twenty-two martyrs, seven archbishops, and seven Victoria Cross winners.

== Alumni of the College at St Omer, Bruges, & Liège (1593–1794) ==
=== Saints, beati and martyrs ===
- St Philip Evans SJ, executed at Cardiff in 1679.

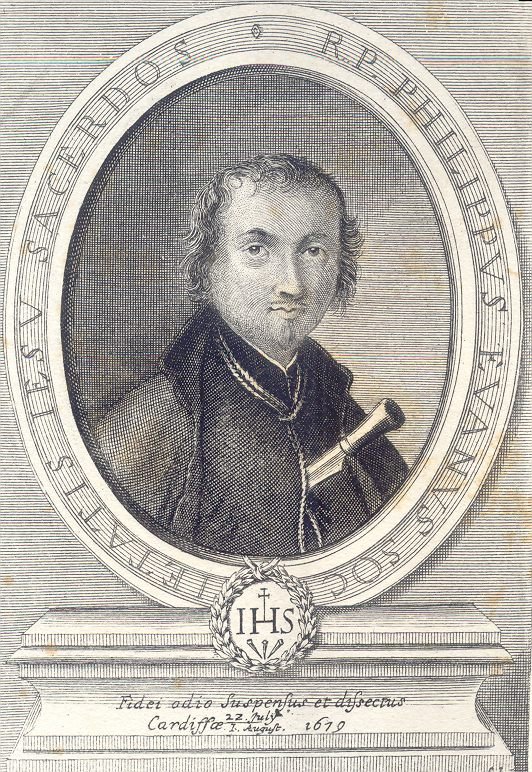
Philip Evans

- St Thomas Garnet SJ, protomartyr of St Omer, one of the Forty Martyrs of England and Wales, executed at Tyburn in 1608.
- St John Plessington, executed at Chester in 1679.
- Bl. Edward Bamber, executed at Lancaster in 1646.
- Bl. William Barrow SJ (aka Fr Harcourt), executed at Tyburn in 1679.
- Bl. Arthur Bell OSF, executed at Tyburn in 1643.
- Bl. Ralph Corbie, executed at Tyburn in 1644.
- Bl. John Fenwick SJ, executed at Tyburn in 1679.

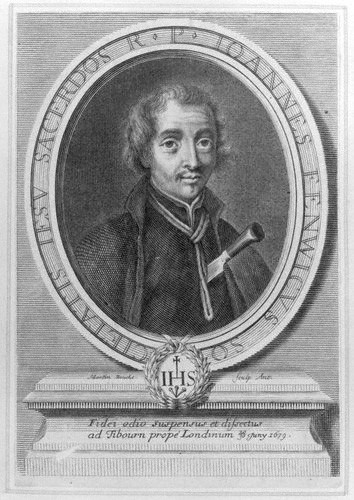
Father John Fenwick, SJ

- Bl. John Gavan SJ, executed at Tyburn in 1679.
- Bl. Thomas Holland SJ, executed at Tyburn in 1642.
- Bl. William Ireland SJ, executed at Tyburn in 1679.
- Bl. Thomas Thwing, executed at York in 1680.
- Bl. Thomas Whitaker, executed at Lancaster in 1646.
- Bl. Thomas Whitbread SJ, executed at Tyburn in 1679.
- Bl. John Woodcock OSF, executed at Lancaster in 1646.

=== Others ===
- Prince Louis Aloy de Hohenlohe-Waldenburg-Bartenstein, General, Marshal of France.
- Francis Baines, English Jesuit educated at Colleges of St Omer
- Henry Blundell, art collector; owner of the largest private art collection in England.

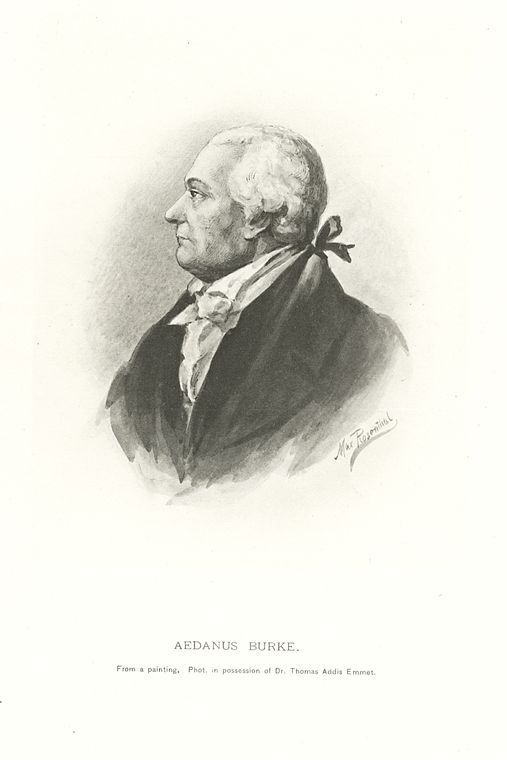
Aedanus Burke

- Hon. Aedanus Burke, soldier, judge and United States Representative from South Carolina. Served in the militia forces of South Carolina during the American Revolutionary War. Appointed judge of the State circuit court; member of the South Carolina House of Representatives; served in the Revolutionary Army. Appointed one of three commissioners to prepare a digest of the State laws; member of the convention in 1788 called to consider ratification of the Constitution of the United States, which he opposed. Elected as an Anti-Administration candidate to the First United States Congress; elected a chancellor of the courts of equity; senior member of the South Carolina appellate courts; Chief Justice of South Carolina.
- Philip Calvert, Keeper of the Conscience of Maryland; Governor of Maryland.
- Charles Carroll of Carrollton, last surviving and only Catholic signer of the U.S. Declaration of Independence, delegate to the Continental Congress and later US Senator for Maryland.
- Daniel Carroll, American Roman Catholic who helped draft the United States Constitution.
- Rt. Rev. John Carroll, first Roman Catholic bishop in the United States of America; first Archbishop of Baltimore, founder of Georgetown University and the Georgetown Preparatory School; John Carroll University is named in his honour.
- John Caryll, 1st Baron Caryll of Durford, in the Jacobite Peerage, poet, dramatist, and diplomat. Translated Ovid's Epistle of Briseïs to Achilles and Virgil's first Eclogue. During the "Popish Plot" was committed to the Tower of London, but was soon let out on bail. When James II of England succeeded to the throne, he sent him as his agent to the court of Pope Innocent XI. Secretary to Queen Mary of Modena, after the Glorious Revolution, he followed the exiled royal family to Saint-Germain. Implicated in a plots to overthrow William of Orange (William III), while in exile he was created by the dethroned James II Baron Caryll of Durford (or Dunford) in West Sussex and appointed his Joint Secretary of State. His son, the so-called Old Pretender, James Francis Edward Stuart, recognised by Jacobites as "King James III and VIII", re-appointed him one of his Secretaries of State.

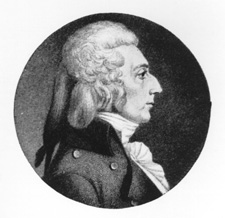
Christopher Grant Champlin

- Christopher G. Champlin, United States Representative and Senator from Rhode Island; elected as a Federalist to the Fifth and Sixth Congresses; president of the Rhode Island Bank.
- Fr Ambrose Corbie, Jesuit teacher and author; appointed confessor at the English College, Rome.
- Sir Henry Gage, Royalist Governor of Oxford during the Civil War.
- Fr Thomas Gage, recusant Catholic, clergyman, ordained Dominican priest; later publicly abandoned the Catholic Church; testified against Thomas Holland, Francis Bell, Ralph Corby and Peter Wright (qvv), all of whom were executed on his evidence. During the English Civil War, he aligned himself with Oliver Cromwell.
- William Habington, poet, works include Castara (1634), The Queen of Arragon (1640) and Observations upon History (1641).

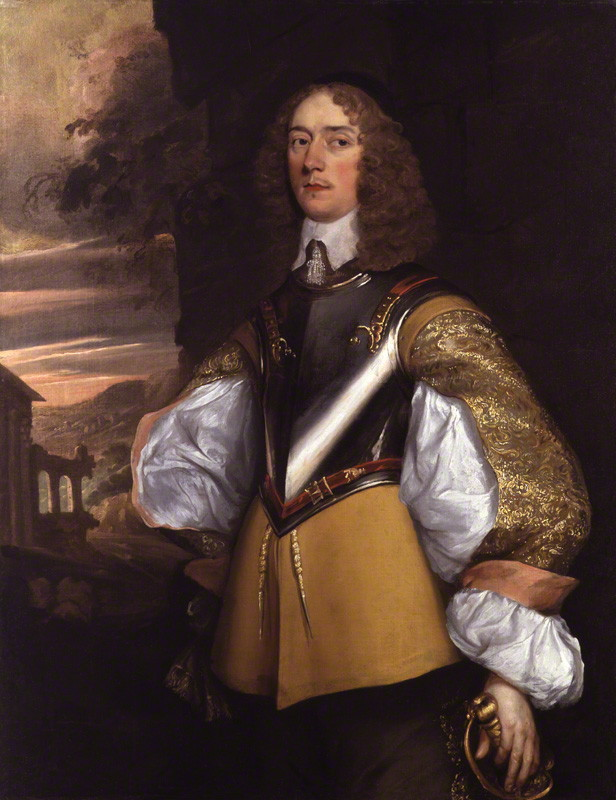
Henry Gage

- Fr Francis Hawkins, Jesuit, child prodigy and translator; translated (at age 10) An Alarum for Ladyes and (at age 13) from de La Serre's Youths Behaviour, or, Decency in Conversation amongst Men (1641).
- Fr. Emmanuel Lobb, SJ, received King James II into the Catholic Church.
- William Kilty (1757–1821), Federal Judicial Service: Chief Judge, Circuit Court of the District of Columbia USCC. Received a recess appointment from Thomas Jefferson on 23 March 1801, to a new seat created by 2 Stat. 103; nominated on 6 January 1802. Confirmed by the Senate on 26 January 1802, and received commission on 26 January 1802. Service terminated on 27 January 1806, due to resignation. Compiler, Laws of Maryland, State of Maryland, 1798–1800; State Governor, Maryland, 1806–21
- Thomas Lloyd, stenographer; known as the "Father of American Shorthand", published the most complete and official record of the First Continental Congress from the notes taken in his shorthand; worked for the United States Treasurer; reported the first Inaugural Address given by George Washington.
- William Matthews, President of Georgetown College and Vicar General of the Diocese of Philadelphia; the first person born in British America to be ordained a Catholic priest.
- Robert P. Molyneux SJ (1738 – 1808); English-American Catholic priest and Jesuit missionary to the United States; 2nd and 5th President of Georgetown University.
- Fr Henry More, Jesuit provincial and church historian; great-grandson St Thomas More; sent on the English Mission where he was twice arrested and imprisoned, whilst chaplain to Lord Petre; as provincial negotiationed with Panzani, Conn and Rossetti (the papal agents at the court of Queen Henrietta Maria); Rector of St Omer.
- Arthur Murphy, author, biographer and barrister, also known by the pseudonym Charles Ranger; friend of Henry Thrale and Samuel Johnson; introduced Thale to Johnson; Commissioner of Bankruptcy; coined the legal term "wilful misconstruction".
- Rt. Rev. Leonard Neale, the first Roman Catholic bishop ordained in the United States, second Archbishop of Baltimore, President of Georgetown University.
- Fr Edward Petre SJ, Jesuit, Privy Councillor during the reign of James II.
- Robert Plunkett SJ (1752 – 1815); Jesuit missionary to the United States who became the first president of Georgetown University
- Ambrose Rookwood, Gunpowder Plotter; executed in 1606 at Westminster with Guy Fawkes.
- Fr Marmaduke Stone, Jesuit Provincial (England, Ireland and Maryland), first President of Stonyhurst.
- Fr Louis de Sabran, French Jesuit, associated with the court of James II, engaged in vigorous theological debates with both Church of England and Puritan spokesmen; royal chaplain to James II; chaplain to the infant Prince of Wales; visitator of the Neapolitan Jesuits; provincial superior; rector of St Omer; spiritual father of the English College in Rome.
- Sir Charles Talbot, 1st Duke of Shrewsbury (1660–1718); a signatory to the letter of invitation to William of Orange 1688; Secretary of State for the Southern Department; Lord Chamberlain; Ambassador to France; Lord Lieutenant of Ireland; Lord Treasurer; Knight of the Garter and Privy Counsellor (Reference St Omers, Bruge and Liege Lists. Published by Catholic Record Society)
- Fr Anthony Terill, Jesuit theologian, academic, educator at Florence, Parma, and at the English College, Liège.
- James White, American physician, lawyer and politician; early settler Tennessee and Louisiana; delegate to the Congress of the Confederation from North Carolina and a delegate to the U.S. House from the Southwest Territory.

== Alumni of the College at Stonyhurst (1794–present) ==
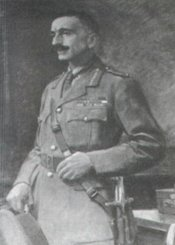
Edmund Costello

=== Victoria Cross Holders ===
Seven Stonyhurst Alumni have won the Victoria Cross.

Gabriel Coury

- Malakand Frontier War, India 1897
  - Lieutenant Edmund William Costello V.C.
- Sudan Campaign 1898
  - Captain Paul Aloysius Kenna V.C.
- World War I
  - Lieutenant Maurice James Dease V.C. (first VC of the Great War)
  - Captain John Aiden Liddell V.C.
  - Second Lieutenant Gabriel George Coury V.C.
- World War II
  - Captain Harold Marcus Ervine-Andrews V.C.
  - Captain James Joseph Bernard Jackman V.C.

=== Others ===
==== A ====
- Joe Ansbro (b.1985) Scottish rugby union football international; 11 caps for Scotland.
- George Archer-Shee (1895 – 1914) acquitted of stealing a five shilling postal whilst a naval cadet. The trial, a cause célèbre, was the inspiration for Terence Rattigan play The Winslow Boy
- James Arundell, 10th Baron Arundell of Wardour (1785 – 1834), admitted to the House of Lords with the Roman Catholic Relief Act 1829.
- Alfred Austin (1835 - 1913), Poet Laureate, following Tennyson, when others had caused controversy or refused. His poems are little remembered today. Wilfred Scawen Blunt (see below) wrote of him, "He is an acute and ready reasoner, and is well read in theology and science. It is strange his poetry should be such poor stuff, and stranger still that he should imagine it immortal”.
- Brittany Ashworth, British film and theatre actress, best known for her roles in Mrs Ratcliffe's Revolution and The Crucifixion

==== B ====
- Patrick Baladi (b.1971), British actor. Most famous for his role as Neil in The Office.
- Iain Balshaw (b.1979) English rugby union football international, 35 caps for England and 3 for the British and Irish Lions, winner 2003 Rugby World Cup
- Joseph Cyril Bamford (1916 - 2001), founder and Chairman of heavy equipment manufacturer J. C. Bamford Excavators Ltd better known as JCB.

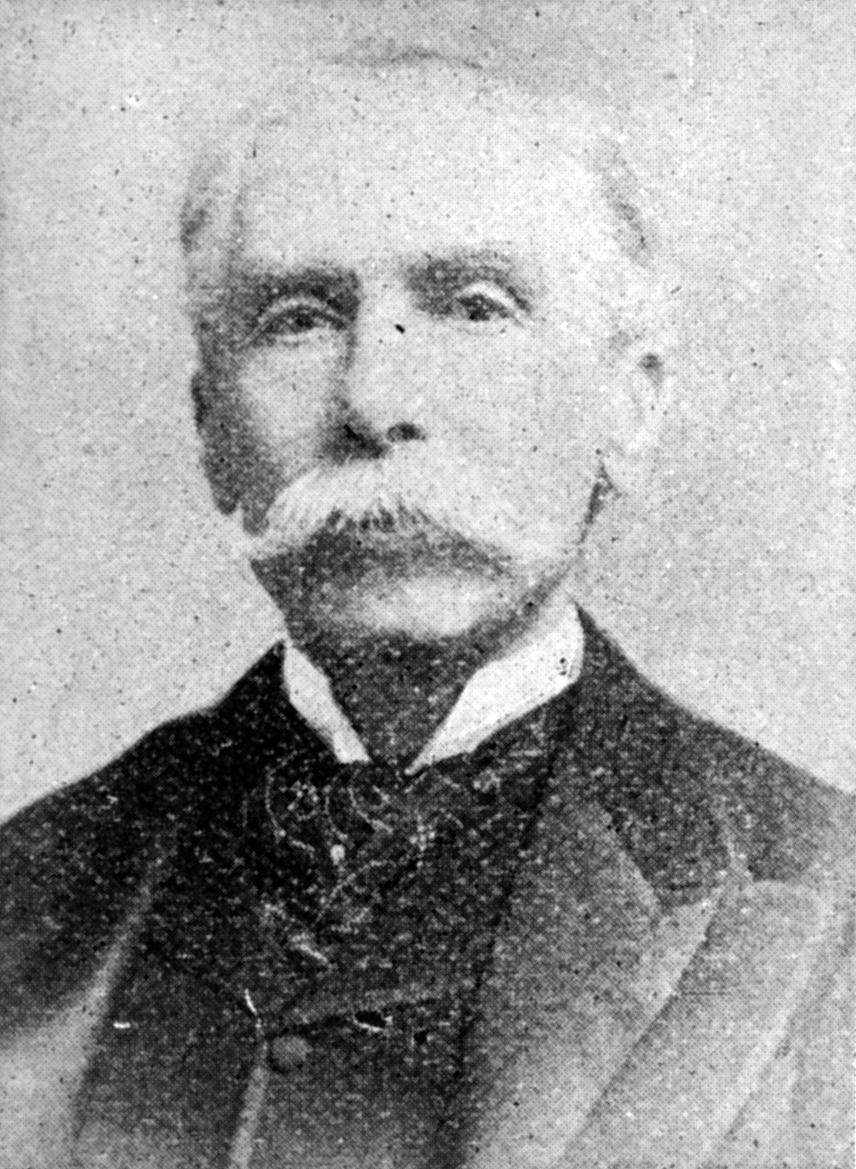
Alfred Austin

- Philip Bell (1900 - 1986), Conservative Member of Parliament 1951 - 1960.
- Count Michael de la Bédoyère (1900 - 1973) author and journalist, editor of the Catholic Herald for over 30 years.
- John Desmond Bernal, FRS (1901 - 1971) scientist known for pioneering X-ray crystallography, Master of Birkbeck, University of London, Professor of Physics and Crystallography, Fellow of the Royal Society, Communist, awarded the Lenin Peace Prize, joint inventor of the Mulberry Harbour. Nominated for 3 Nobel Prizes - physics 1959 and 1966; chemistry 1970.

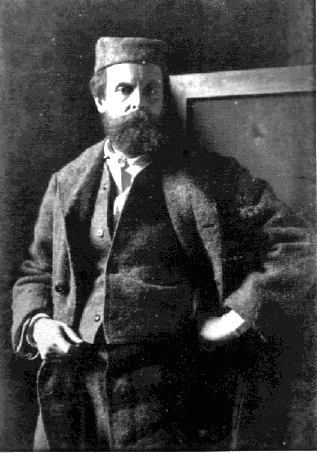
Wilfrid Scawen Blunt

- Sir Rowland Blennerhassett (1839–1909), 4th baronet, politician and author. Liberal Member of Parliament for Galway 1865 – 74.
- Sir Wilfrid Scawen Blunt (1840–1922), diplomat, poet, traveler; opposed British rule in Egypt and British policy in the Sudan; Muslim sympathiser; championed Irish Home Rule; founder of Crabbet Arabian Stud.
- Fr Charles Boarman, S.J., sub-editor of Jesuit publication, The Month; founding rector of the mission of St Wilfred, Longridge.
- HRH Prince Felix of Bourbon-Parma (1893 - 1970) consort of Charlotte, Grand Duchess of Luxembourg father of Jean, Grand Duke of Luxembourg. Eldest son of Robert I, Duke of Parma and member of the House of Bourbon-Parma, descendant of Philip V of Spain. Longest ever serving consort of the Grand Duchy of Luxembourg.
- Kyran Bracken (b.1971) English Rugby Union International, 51 caps for England and World Cup Winner 2003. Captained England on 3 occasions.
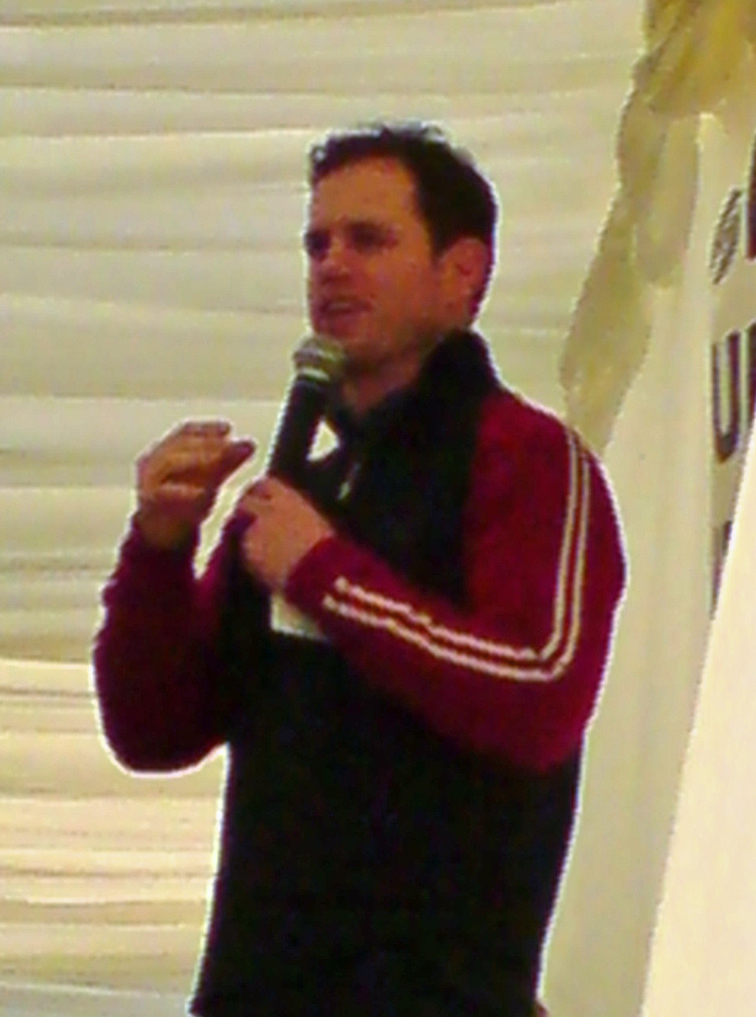
  Kyran Bracken
- Fr Charles Brigham, S.J., author of The Enormities of the Confessional Examined.

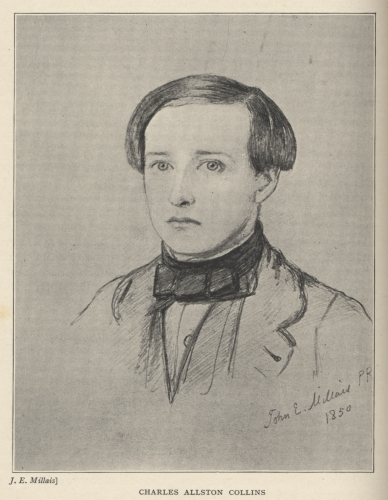
Charles Allston Collins

- Sir Edward Bulfin KCB CVO (1862 - 1939) general during World War I, established a reputation as an excellent commander; noted for his actions during the First Battle of Ypres, when he organized impromptu forces to slow down the German assault.
- Norman Butler (1918 - 2011) international polo player and thoroughbred breeder, who won several classic races including the Irish 1,000 Guineas, Irish St. Leger and Pretty Polly Stakes.
- Mullah John Butt (b.1950) Islamic scholar and broadcaster, known as the first Westerner to graduate from Darul Uloom Deoband, former Cambridge University Islamic chaplain.

==== C ====
- Fr Brendan Callaghan, SJ, (b.1948), Theologian, Principal of Heythrop College, University of London 1985 - 1997, Master of Campion Hall, University of Oxford 2008 - 2013.
- Captain Arthur Edward Capel (1881–1919), CBE; known as “Boy Capel”, British polo player; best known as muse of Coco Chanel, financed Chanel's first shops and his own clothing style, notably his blazers, inspired her creation of the Chanel look including the CC Chanel logo and Chanel No 5 perfume bottle
- Sir William Cash, Kt, CH (b.1940) Member of Parliament 1984 - 2024 (Conservative), Shadow Cabinet 2001 -2004, leading Brexiteer.
- Sir Arthur (Tim) Chessells (b.1941) Chairman Legal Aid Board; Chairman British Telecommunications Pension Scheme 1999 - 2007; Chairman London Implementation Group for St. Bartholomew's Hospital and Royal London Hospital
- Pratap Chitnis, Baron Chitnis (1936 - 2013) Life Peer; Chief Executive and Director of the Liberal Party.
- Sir Charles Clifford (1813 - 1893) New Zealand politician, first Speaker of the House of Representatives.

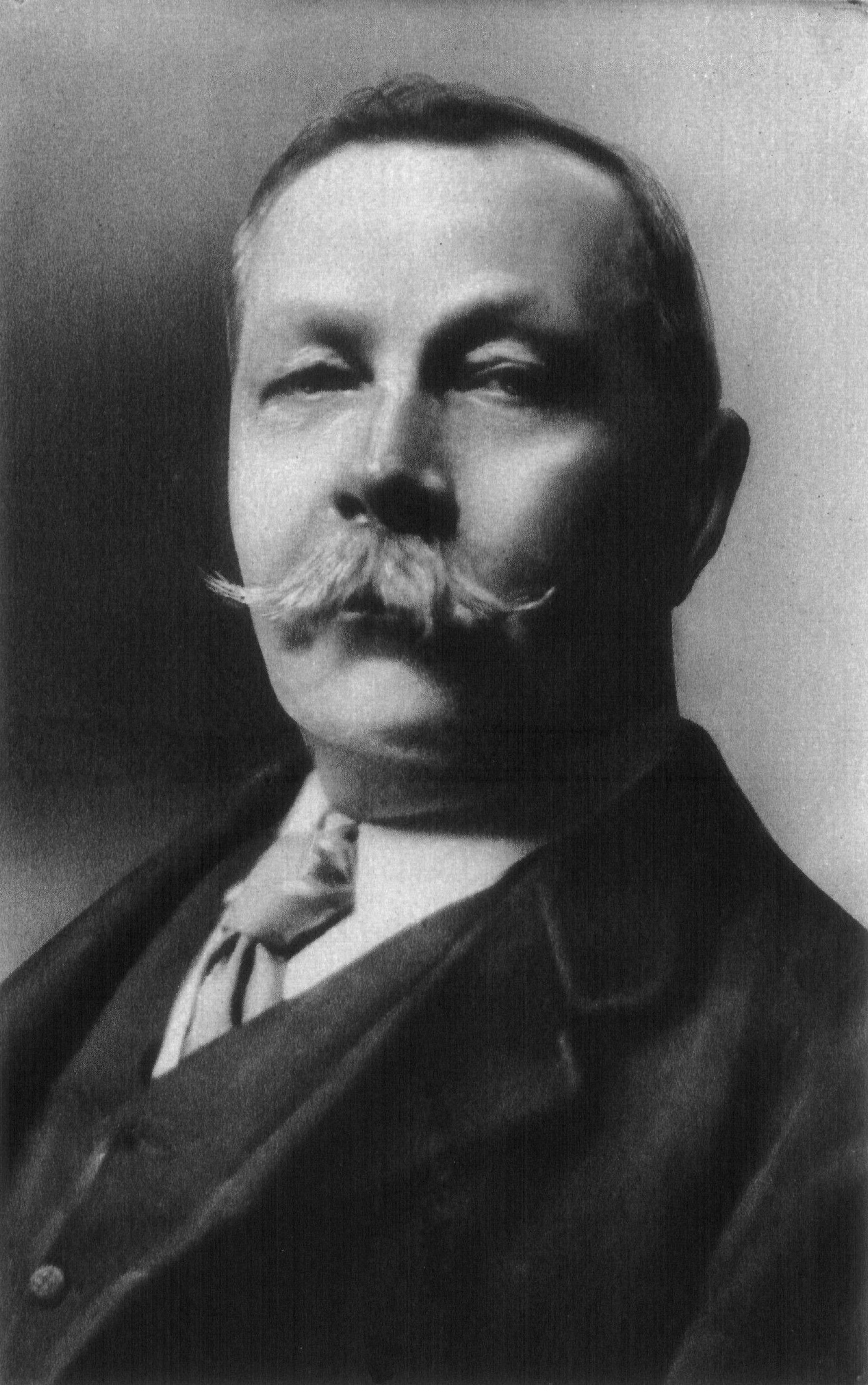
Arthur Conan Doyle

- Hugh Clifford, 7th Baron Clifford of Chudleigh, Whig politician, leading advocate of Catholic Emancipation; accompanied Cardinal Consalvi to the Congress of Vienna.
- Colin Clive, (1900 – 1937) actor, most famous for his role as Dr Henry Frankenstein in the 1931 film Frankenstein and its 1935 sequel, Bride of Frankenstein)
- Sir Cecil Clothier KCB QC (1919 – 2010) Judge of Appeal on the Isle of Man, Parliamentary Commissioner for Administration and Health Service Commissioner for England, Scotland and Wales (Parliamentary and Health Service Ombudsman). First Chairman of the Police Complaints Authority.
- Charles Allston Collins (1828 - 1873) artist and author, proposed for membership of the Pre-Raphaelite Brotherhood by John Everett Millais but was rejected, son in law of Charles Dickens
- Marmaduke Constable-Maxwell, 11th Lord Herries of Terregles (1837 – 1908) Lord Lieutenant of the East Riding of Yorkshire 1880 - 1908 and Lord-Lieutenant of Kirkcudbrightshire 1885 - 1908. Father in law to 15th Duke of Norfolk.
- John Coope, MBE (1929–2006), physician; founder of the Bollington Arts Centre and the Bollington Festival.
- John D. Cronin (1916 - 1986) Labour MP for Loughborough 1955 - 1979.
- Edward Micklethwaite Curr, Australian pastoralist and squatter.
- John da Cunha (1922 - 2006) barrister and judge, member of the British delegation to the Nuremberg War Crimes Tribunal.
- Charles Curran (1903 - 1971) Conservative MP for Uxbridge 1959 - 1966; 1970 - 1972.

==== D ====
- Bernard Dobson, first-class cricketer.
- Sir Arthur Conan Doyle (1859 - 1930) author. He created the character Sherlock Holmes in 1887 for A Study in Scarlet, the first of four novels and fifty-six short stories about Holmes and Dr. Watson. The Sherlock Holmes stories are milestones in the field of crime fiction.
- Fr William Doyle, S.J. MC (1873 – 1917) Irish Jesuit killed in action whilst serving as a military chaplain to the Royal Dublin Fusiliers during the First World War. A candidate for sainthood in the Catholic Church.

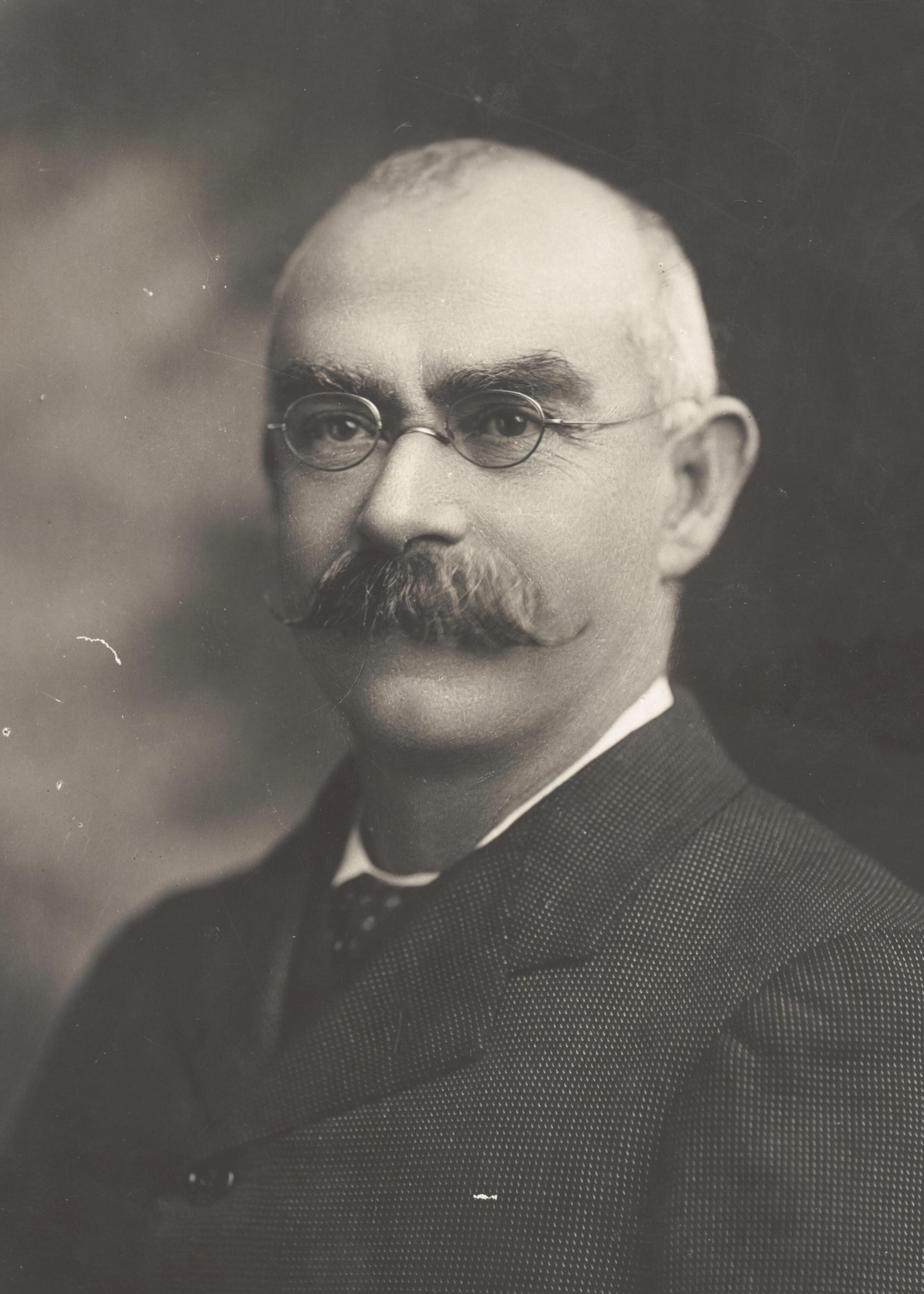
Frank Gavan Duffy

- George Gavan Duffy (1882 – 1951); Irish politician, barrister and judge; President of the High Court 1946 - 51; Minister for Foreign Affairs 1922; Teachta Dála (TD) for Dublin County 1921 - 23 and previously Member of Parliament (MP) for the Dublin South constituency 1918 - 21; appointed by Éamon de Valera as one of the plenipotentiaries under Michael Collins to negotiate the Anglo-Irish Treaty in 1921; signatory of the Treaty; acted as an unofficial legal advisor to Éamon de Valera drafting the 1937 Constitution of Ireland and was consulted on many issues pertaining to it.
- Charles Gavan Duffy (1855–1932), Australian public servant, Assisted drafting the Commonwealth of Australia's Constitution; Clerk of the House of Representatives; Clerk of the Senate.
- Sir Frank Gavan Duffy, Chief Justice of the High Court of Australia.
- John Gavan Duffy (1844–1917), Australian solicitor and politician, Member of the Legislative Assembly; President of the Board of Land and Works, Commissioner of Crown Lands and Survey and Minister of Agriculture; Postmaster-General; Attorney-General.
- Archibald Matthias Dunn, Catholic ecclesiastical architect.

==== E ====
- Sir John Ennis, 1st Baronet (1800 – 1878), Independent Irish and Liberal MP 1857 - 65, first Catholic Governor of the Bank of Ireland.
- Manuel Escandón y Barrón, Marqués de Villavieja, Mexican entrepreneur and sportsman, introduced polo to Spain and Latin America.
- Pablo Escandón y Barrón, Governor of Morelos (Mexico) and aide-de-camp of President Porfirio Díaz.
- John Esmonde (1862 - 1915) physician and Irish nationalist politician. Irish Parliamentary Party Member of Parliament for North Tipperary 1910 - 15

==== F ====
- Simon Fell (b.1981) Conservative Member of Parliament for Barrow and Furness 2019 to 2024.
- Percy Fitzgerald author, sculptor, man of letters, socialite, historian of the Garrick Club, close friend of Charles Dickens

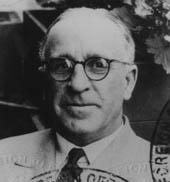
Frank Foley

- Merrick Farran (1906-1991), British composer, arranger and violinist
- Frank Foley, British soldier and secret agent during World War II. He was hailed as the "British Schindler". As an undercover passport control officer he helped thousands of Jews escape from Nazi Germany. In October 1999 he was accorded the status of a Righteous Among the Nations by Israel's Yad Vashem.

==== G ====
- Gerald Gallagher, Colonial Administrator Service, noted as the first officer-in-charge of the Phoenix Islands Settlement Scheme, the last colonial expansion of the British Empire.
- Eulogio Gillow y Zavala, Archbishop of Antequera (Oaxaca, Mexico).
- Peter Glenville (1913 – 96); theatre and film director; nominated for four Tony Awards. His first film, The Prisoner (1955), was nominated for Best Film and Best British Film at the 9th British Academy Film Awards (BAFTA); nominated for a Best Director Oscar and a Golden Globe for Becket. Two of his other films, Summer and Smoke (1961) and Term of Trial (1962), were both nominated for the Venice Film Festival's Golden Lion. In 2013 critic Rupert Christiansen posthumously described him as a "forgotten giant of mid-20th-century directing."

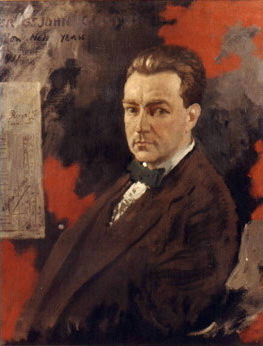
Oliver St John Gogarty

- Oliver St John Gogarty (1878 - 1957) poet, author and wit; Irish Free State Senator of the Irish Free State; surgeon; Olympic medal for Poetry; inspiration for Buck Mulligan in James Joyce's masterpiece Ulysses.
- Maurice Gorham (1902 - 75) journalist and broadcaster; Director of BBC Light Programme; first post-war Director of the BBC Television Service; Director of Radio Éireann.
- Michael Gough, (1916 - 73) archaeologist; Director of the British Institute of Archaeology at Ankara (1961-1968). As Director of the BIAA Gough pioneered the archaeology of early Christian sites in Turkey in anticipation of changes in academic viewpoints which were to follow in the 1990s.
- Morgan Grace (1837 – 1903); member of the Legislative Council of New Zealand 1870 - 1903.
- Matt Greenhalgh (b.1972) screenwriter; best known for biopic films, including Control (2007), Nowhere Boy (2009), Film Stars Don't Die in Liverpool (2017), and Back to Black (2024); five BAFTA nominations, winning once for Most Promising Newcomer for Control —which also earned him an Evening Standard British Film Award for Best Screenplay.
- Richard Gwyn (1934 – 2020); British-Canadian journalist, author, historian; awarded the Order of Canada.

==== H ====
- Archduke Franz Karl Habsburg, Austrian noble
- Sir William Hackett (1824 – 1877); Irish judge; Chief Justice of Fiji; Chief Justice of Ceylon.
- John Harbison (1935 - 2020); State Pathologist of Ireland
- Macdonald Hastings, British journalist; World War II war correspondent
- Tim Hetherington, British photojournalist and documentary maker, Oscar nominee
- Sir Michael Joseph Hogan, Chief Justice of Hong Kong
- Vyvyan Holland son of Oscar Wilde
- Major Genenal Hopkinson (1931 - 2016); Seaforth Highlanders; Chief of Staff HG Allied Forces Northern Europe; Major-General with seniority and Colonel of the Queen’s Own Highlanders throughout his service.
- William Horton, English cricketer; represented Middlesex and the Europeans in India
- Sir John Hughes (1857–1912), Australian solicitor and politician; Knight Commander of the Order of St Gregory; Member of the Legislative Council; Vice-President of the Executive Council; Minister of Justice
- Sir Thomas Hughes, first Lord Mayor of Sydney. Edward VII conferred the title of Lord Mayor on the position of Mayor; the first Lord Mayoralty created outside the British Isles
- Michael D. Hurley, academic, Professor of Literature and Theology at the University of Cambridge, and a Fellow and Director of Studies in English at Trinity College, Cambridge
- Giles Hussey, artist, painted a number of portraits, specializing in drawings in profile. Examples of his portraiture in oils include a portrait of Sir John Swinburne and a portrait of William Meredith

==== I ====
- Leonard Ingrams, founder of the Garsington Opera Festival
- Albert Isola, Gibraltarian politician; Minister for Financial Services and Gaming
- Peter Isola, Gibraltarian politician; member of the House of Assembly; leader of the Democratic Party of British Gibraltar; Minister for Education; Leader of the Opposition; Deputy Chief Minister; appeared before the UN to resist demand to integrate Gibraltar into Spain
- Valentine Irwin, introduced polo to the British Isles

==== J ====
- Dom Bede Jarrett OP (1881 - 1934) Dominican friar and historian. Founded Blackfriars Hall, University of Oxford 1921, formally reinstating the Dominican Order at the university for the first time since King Henry VIII. Close friend of Graham Greene.
- Paul Johnson CBE, (1928 – 2023) journalist, popular historian, speechwriter and author. Associated with the political left in his early career, he became a popular conservative historian. Editor of the New Statesman 1965 - 70. Awarded the Presidential Medal of Freedom by U.S. President George W. Bush 2006. Father of businessman Luke Johnson, former chairman of Channel 4.
- Richard 'Rick' Jolly OBE (1946 - 2018) Royal Navy surgeon who served in the Falklands War 1982. Decorated by both the British and Argentinians for distinguished conduct. The only person to be decorated by both sides.
- Richard and Antony Joseph founders of Joseph Joseph a British houseware manufacturer best known for its design-led products

==== K ====
- Bruce Kent, British peace campaigner; chairman of the CND; laicised priest
- Miles Gerard Keon, journalist, novelist, Colonial secretary and lecturer
- Thomas Kenny, (1833 – 1908), merchant and Conservative MP for Halifax in the Canadian House of Commons.

==== L ====
- Guillermo Landa y Escandón (1842 – 1927), Mexican politician and businessman. Governor of the Federal District of Mexico, one of the Porfirio Díaz administration's Científicos.
- The Hon. Charles Langdale, one of the foremost leaders of Catholic Emancipation, Member of Parliament (Whig), wrote the memoirs of Maria Fitzherbert
- Charles Laughton, (1899 – 1962) actor, winner Academy Award “Oscar” for best actor in a leading role (first British citizen to do so) and a Grammy Award, nominated for two BAFTA Awards and a Golden Globe Award, earned a motion star on the Hollywood Walk of Fame in 1960.
- Professor Gabriel Leung, GBS, JP, physician and epidemiologist, longest-serving dean of medicine at the University of Hong Kong, Professor in Population Health. Formerly Hong Kong's first undersecretary for food and health and director of the Office of the Chief Executive at the Government of Hong Kong
- James Lomax, Lord of the Manor of Great Harwood, benefactor of Stonyhurst College
- Eduardo López de Romaña, President of Peru (brother of Alejandro López de Romaña, see above)
- Giuseppe Lorenzo 6th Marquis de Piro, Chamberlain to Pope Leo XIII, Knight of Malta
- Robert Loughnan, Member of the Legislative Council (New Zealand), Member of Parliament, journalist, critic and inventor.
- Enoch Louis Lowe, Governor of the state of Maryland (USA) (1851–1854)

==== M ====
- The Dermot MacDermot Prince of Coolavin KCMG CBE (1906–1989), Chief of the Name, Head of the MacDermot Clan and descendant of the Kings of Moylurg; British Ambassador to Indonesia (1956–59) and Thailand (1961–65)
- Henry McGee (1928 - 2006) British actor, best known as straight man to Benny Hill; announcer on Hill's TV programme, delivering the upbeat intro "Yes! It's The Benny Hill Show!"
- Paddy McNally (b.1937), businessman and former racing driver. He was chief executive of Allsport Management, a Swiss-based company that controlled Formula One advertising and hospitality via the Paddock Club.
- Thomas Francis Meagher, Irish nationalist politician; Member of Parliament (Repeal Party); accredited with introducing the tricolour of green, white and orange to Ireland - based on the French tricolour; General in the American Civil War, later Governor of the State of Montana.
- Charles Meldon (1841 – 1892) barrister and Irish nationalist politician. Home Rule Party and later Irish Parliamentary Party Member of Parliament for Kildare 1875 – 85
- James Monahan, dance critic Guardian newspaper; Director of the Royal Ballet School (1978–83)
- Joseph Sheridan Moore (1828–1891), Australian teacher, publicist
- Anthony Moorhouse (1935 – 1956) executed by Egyptians during the Crisis. Moorhouse's death was the model for the fate of "Mick Rice" in John Osborne's The Entertainer. It was also the inspiration for the depiction of Leslie Williams, a British conscript soldier seized by the IRA in Brendan Behan's play The Hostage.
- Chris Morris (b.1962) comedian, radio presenter, actor and filmmaker. Known for his deadpan, dark humour, surrealism and controversial subject matter, he has been praised by the British Film Institute for his "uncompromising, moralistic drive"; creator of "Brass Eye"; BAFTA winner (brother of Tom Morris; see below)
- Tom Morris OBE (b.1964), Tony Award-winning theatre director, writer and producer. Artistic Director at BAC (Battersea Arts Centre) 1995 - 2004; Artistic Director Bristol Old Vic 2009 - 22; Associate Director Royal National Theatre from 2004; Associate Director of popular stage play War Horse (brother of Chris Morris; see above)
- Bryan Mullanphy (1809 – 51) 10th Mayor of St. Louis 1847 - 8, US philanthropist who established a collection of Native American artefacts (now held in the British Museum).
- Gonzalo de Aguilera Munro, 11th Conde de Alba de Yeltes (1886 – 1965), Falangist and military officer who served with the nationalist faction of the Spanish Army during the Spanish Civil War. He served as the press officer for General Francisco Franco and General Emilio Mola.
- Marc Murtra (b.1972), British-born, Spanish engineer and businessman. Since January 2025, he has been the executive Chairman of Telefónica; from 2021 -25 President of Indra Sistemas; board member of Fundació Bancaria "la Caixa" and independent counselor of Ebro Foods, S.A.

==== N ====
- Francis Neale, (d. 1837) President of Georgetown University (1806-7).
- Lt Col John Nolan (1838 – 1912) landowner and Irish nationalist politician. Irish Parliamentary Party Member of Parliament for Galway 1874 – 85; North Galway 1885 – 95 and 1900 – 06.

==== O ====
- Michael O'Donnell, British physician, journalist and broadcaster. His daughter Lucy O'Donnell was a childhood friend of Julian Lennon and Julian's drawing of her inspired John Lennon to write the Beatles song Lucy in the Sky with Diamonds.
- Barry O'Driscoll, (b.1943) Irish rugby union international (elder brother of John O'Driscoll, see below)
- John O'Driscoll, (b.1952) Irish rugby union international, British and Irish Lion, elected 136th President of the Irish Rugby Union Board 2025 (younger brother of Barry O'Driscoll, see above)
- Rt Hon Richard More O'Ferrall, Member of Parliament (Whig) and Privy Counsellor, he and the Archbishop of Dublin were the only Catholics to sit on the Royal Commission to report into the condition of the poor in Ireland; adviser to the Catholic University. In 1835, under Lord Melbourne he was appointed Lord of the Treasury, First Secretary of the Admiralty; Secretary to the Treasury; he was the first civilian to hold the post of Governor of Malta.
- Brendan O'Friel, Governing Governor of HM Prison Service, Governor of HM Prison Strangeways (renamed Manchester) during the "Strangeways riots"
- Henry O'Hara (1853–1921), Australian surgeon
- Valentine O'Hara (1875–1941), noted author and authority on Russia and The Baltic States
- Dr. George Oliver, antiquary and Church annalist
- Richard O’Shaughnessy CB, MVO (1842 – 1918) Home Rule Party Member of Parliament for Limerick City 1974 – 83

==== P ====
- Sir Bernard Partridge, Punch cartoonist
- Air Chief Marshal Sir Hubert Patch, KCB, CBE (1904–1987) senior Royal Air Force commander; Air Officer Commanding No. 11 Group RAF 1953–1956; Commander-in-Chief Fighter Command 1956; Commander-in-Chief RAF Middle East Air Force 1956–1958; Air Member for Personnel 1959; Air Officer Commanding British Forces Arabian Peninsula 1959–1960.
- John Pinasco (1837–1897), President of the University of San Francisco1876 - 1880; President of Santa Clara University (1880 - 83 and 1888 - 93)
- Fr Charles Plowden, Jesuit, Rector of Stonyhurst, writer and orator
- Francis Plowden, barrister, writer, academic; Professor at the Scots College, Paris
- Jonathan Plowright, concert pianist, Gold Medalist at the Royal Academy of Music and a Fulbright Scholar; winner of the European Piano Competition
- Joseph Mary Plunkett, Irish rebel; helped compose the Proclamation of Independence, to which he was a signatory; executed for his role in the 1916 Easter Rising
- George Oliver Plunkett, (1894–1944) younger brother of Joseph Plunkett (see above), a militant Irish republican; sentenced to death after the 1916 Easter Rising, but sentence was commuted and released in 1917; fought in the Irish War of Independence and Irish Civil War, IRA Chief of Staff in the 1940s.
- George Porter, Archbishop of Bombay
- Paul Potts (writer) poet and close friend of George Orwell
- Patrick Power (1850–1913) landowner and Irish nationalist politician. Home Rule Party Member of Parliament for County Waterford 1884–1885 and East Waterford 1885–1913.
- George Powys, 7th Baron Lilford landowner and member of the House of Lords

==== R ====
- Anthony Rickards, British cardiologist who devised a revolutionary pacemaker that responded to the demands of the body during exercise and foreshadowed the technology used in nearly all pacemakers; also created the first computerised cardiac database in Britain; helped establish the Central Cardiac Audit Database
- John Rogers (1842–1908), Australian educationist and politician; Member of the Victorian Legislative Assembly
- John Gage Rokewode, antiquarian, Fellow of the Royal Society; Fellow, and later Director, Society of Antiquaries
- Ted Russell, (1912 - 2004) Irish TD and later Senator, businessman; five times Mayor of Limerick City; played rugby for Munster

==== S ====
- Victor Santa Cruz, Chilean law professor, member of the Chilean Congress (1945-1949), Chilean Ambassador to the United Kingdom (1958-1970)
- Sir Edward Strickland, CB, Army officer, author, vice-president of the Geographical Society of Australasia, a founder and president of the society's New South Wales branch, president of the Australian Geographical Conference in 1884 and vice-president of the Australasian Association for the Advancement of Science; Promoted to Commissary-General (ranking with Major-General); served in Ireland as senior commissariat officer. The Strickland River in New Guinea is named after him
- Charles Sturridge, British film/television director (best known for the television adaptation of Brideshead Revisited)
- Francis L. Sullivan, British-American actor, known for his portrayals of Dickensian characters such as Jaggers in Great Expectations and Bumble in David Lean's Oliver Twist (1948).
- Major Francis Suttill, British special agent who worked for the Special Operations Executive (SOE) inside France; organized and coordinated the Physician network, better known by his own code name "Prosper"; captured and killed by the Nazis

==== T ====
- John Talbot, 16th Earl of Shrewsbury
- Pierre-Emmanuel Taittinger (b.1953) CEO of Taittinger champagne 2006 - 2019.
- Sir Mark Thompson (b.1957) CEO of CNN. Formerly President and CEO of The New York Times; Director-General of the BBC and Chief Executive of Channel 4.
- William Tobin (1859–1904), Australian Cricket International player
- Rt Hon Sir Colman Treacy (b.1949) Lord Justice of Appeal and Chairman of the Sentencing Council 2012 - 18.
- Arthur Turcotte, Quebec lawyer, journalist and politician; Mayor of Trois-Rivières; member of the Legislative Assembly of Quebec (independent Conservative; later Liberal); Speaker of the Assembly; helped found La Concorde, becoming its editor; minister without portfolio and attorney general under Honoré Mercier; appointed protonotary for the Superior Court in Montreal district

==== U ====
- Sir Edgar Unsworth KBE, CMG, QC (1906 – 2006), lawyer and judge; Attorney-General for Northern Rhodesia; Chief Justice of Gibraltar.

==== V ====
- Fr Bernard Vaughan, Jesuit social reformer who worked among the poor of Westminster and in the East End. His sermons on "The Sins of Society" attracted large audiences. He preached at Montreal in 1910, traveled in Canada, the United States, and Alaska, and lectured in China, Japan, Italy and France. In 1915 he became chaplain to Catholic troops of the British expeditionary army on the Continent (brother of Herbert Cardinal Vaughan, see below)
- Herbert Cardinal Vaughan, Archbishop of Westminster (brother of Fr Bernard Vaughan, see above)

==== W ====
- Sir George Wakeman, physician to Queen Catherine of Braganza, accused by Titus Oates of trying to poison her husband Charles II, subsequently acquitted
- George Herbert Walker, banker and businessman; President of the United States Golf Association–the Walker Cup (the famous biennial golf match) acquired Walker's namesake for his role in the event's creation; descendants include grandson George H. W. Bush and great-grandson George W. Bush, both of whom served as President of the United States
- General Vernon A. Walters, General, United States Army; Deputy Director of the CIA; U.S. Ambassador to the United Nations
- Sir Christopher Waterlow, Camera Supervisor at QVC UK; Honorary Fellow of the Institute of Videography
- Edmund Waterton, antiquary, formed a collection of rings, awarded the Order of Christ (the highest Papal decoration)
- Charles Waterton, Naturalist and creator of the world's first national park

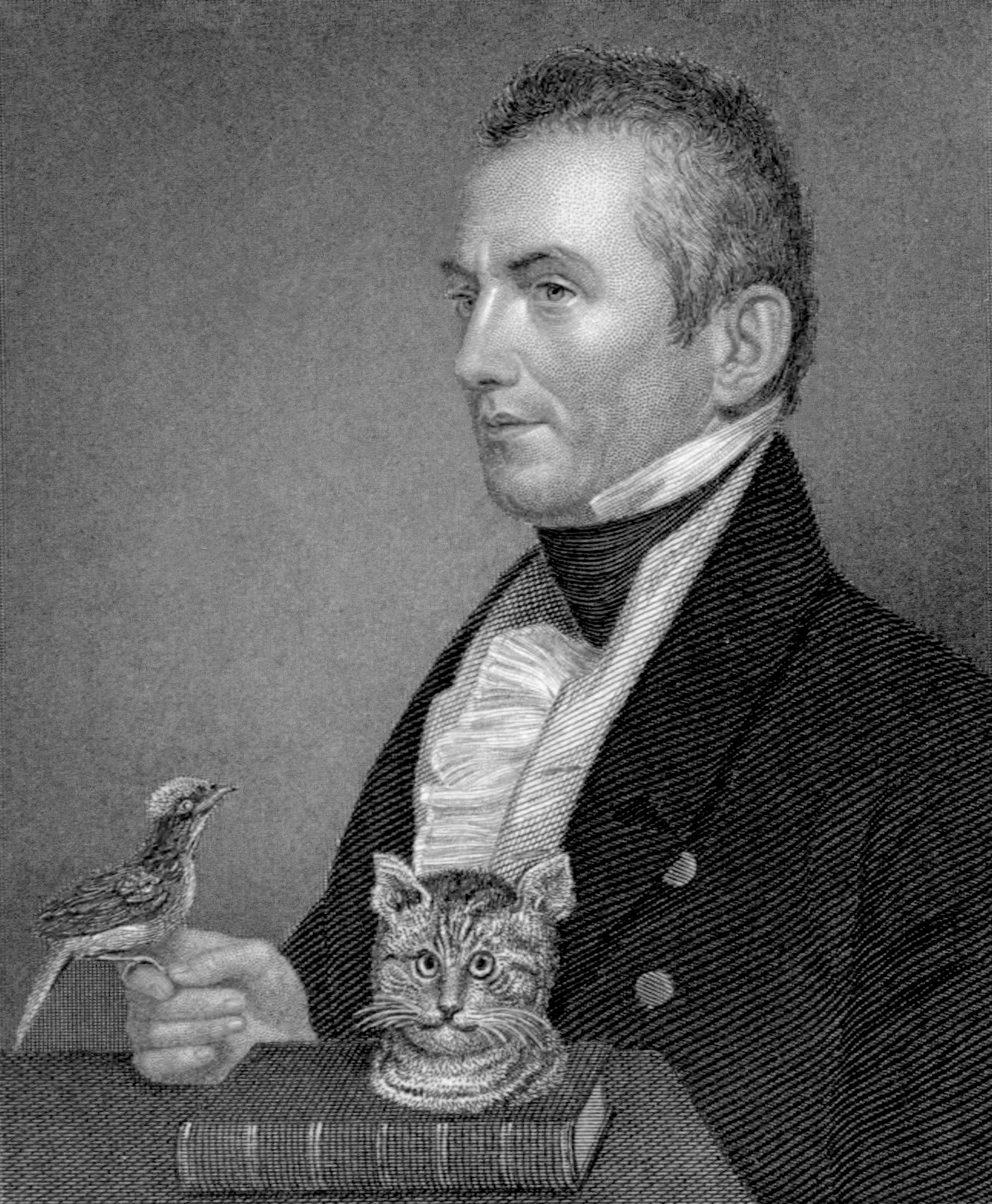
Charles Waterton

- Fr James Waterworth, missionary priest who published "Faith of Catholics", a translation of the canons and decrees of the Council of Trent and of Veron's "Rule of Faith"; his last book, England and Rome was on the relations of the Popes to post-Reformation England. He was made canon and later provost of Nottingham.
- James Waugh son of Evelyn Waugh
- Sir Frederick Weld, New Zealand politician; elected to the first House of Representatives; member of the Stafford Executive; Native Affairs Minister; Prime Minister; Governor of West Australia; Governor of Tasmania; Governor of the Straits Settlements; Knight of the Order of St Pius.
- Christopher Wenner, journalist and television presenter for the BBC's Blue Peter programme and an overseas correspondent for ITN's Channel 4 News; under the nom-de-guerre "Max Stahl", Wenner has become a war correspondent, whose footage brought the plight of the East Timorese to world attention; winner of the Rory Peck Award for his journalism.
- George J. Wigley, architect, journalist, co-founder of the Society of St Vincent de Paul, co-founder of the Peterspence Association, awarded the Cross of St Gregory the Great by Pius IX.
- Douglas Wilmer, British actor (primarily associated with the role of Sherlock Holmes)
- Paul Woodroffe, stained glass artist and book illustrator, produced the 15 windows for the Lady Chapel of St. Patrick's Cathedral (NYC)
- Hugh Wooldridge, theatre and television director and producer
- Sir Thomas Wyse, Member of Parliament (Liberal and second Irish Roman Catholic), advocate of Catholic Emancipation; Junior Lord of the Treasury; Secretary to the Board of Control; British Ambassador to the Kingdom of Greece

==== Y ====
- Yuan Yermo (b.1972), Chief of Staff of the OECD (Organisation for Economic Co-operation and Development) 2020 - 22; currently Director General of Farmaondustrai, Madrid.

=== Fictional alumnus ===
- Lord Brideshead, the Earl of Brideshead, heir to the Marquess of Marchmain; "Bridey" – fictional character from Evelyn Waugh's Brideshead Revisited

== Miscellaneous accolades ==
The following were awarded to former Stonyhurst pupils: 1914-1918 war:

- 30 Distinguished Service Orders
- 77 Military Crosses
- 4 Distinguished Flying Crosses
- 2 Air Force Crosses

Second World War:

- 12 Distinguished Service Orders
- 8 Distinguished Service Crosses, one with Bar
- 30 Military Crosses
- 9 Distinguished Flying Crosses
- 4 Croix de Guerre, one with Palm
- 1 Air Force Cross

Six O.S. were killed serving in the Second Boer War.

== See also ==
- College of St Omer
- Stonyhurst College
- Stonyhurst Saint Mary's Hall
- List of alumni of Jesuit educational institutions
- Society of Jesus
- St Ignatius, founder of the Jesuits
