= School life at Stonyhurst College =

Features of Stonyhurst College

== School Organisation ==
=== The Playroom System ===
Stonyhurst differs from most British senior independent schools in that it is organised horizontally by year groups, known as “playrooms,” rather than vertically by houses. However, the girls are also divided into junior and senior houses. Each playroom has an assigned playroom master, with each cohort moving through the playrooms, having a sequence of playroom masters (rather than a single housemaster).

All of the accommodation for boarders is contained within the college, under a single roof, with separate areas for each playroom.

Currently, Stonyhurst has the following playrooms, following the Roman order of learning (from Elements upwards):

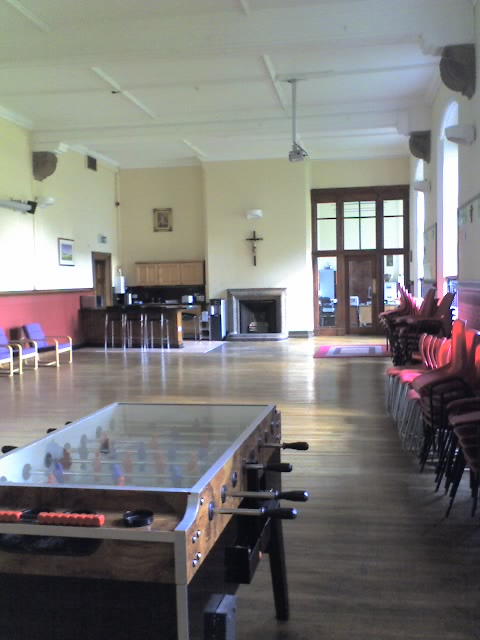
Lower Grammar Playroom in 2006

St Mary's Hall

- Hodder House (Pre-Prep. 3-7)
- Hodder Playroom (Prep. & Elements 7-10)
- Figures Playroom (10-12)
- Rudiments Playroom ('Ruds', 12-13)

Stonyhurst College

Lower Line:

- Lower Grammar Playroom ('LG' 13-14)
- Grammar Playroom (14-15)
- Syntax Playroom (15-16, GCSE Year)

Higher Line (Sixth Form):

- Poetry Playroom (16-17)
- Rhetoric Playroom (17-18)

Before Catholics were accepted at British Universities, Stonyhurst was also home to a number of "gentlemen philosophers", engaged in university-level study. Typically these were wealthy aristocrats who were not first in line to inherit their parents' estates. The practice died out before the First World War. The Philosophers' common room is now used by the teaching staff. Back when pupils returned after A-levels to cram for entrance exams to Oxford and Cambridge, the higher line playrooms were called Upper Syntax and Poetry, with Rhetoric for the boys cramming for Oxbridge.

=== Lines ===
In addition to the horizontal division of the school into playrooms, there is also a vertical grouping which cuts through the year groups: the "lines". This system is used mostly for competitive purposes in sport and music. The Lines and colours are as follows:

- Campion (Red) (after St Edmund Campion)
- St Omers (Yellow, though Brown for sporting attire) (after Saint-Omer, the French town the school was founded in)
- Shireburn (Green) (after the Shireburn family, who built the building the college currently resides in)
- Weld (Blue) (after Thomas Weld who donated Stonyhurst to the Society of Jesus)

Pupils remain in the same line throughout their time at the school, and if their parents or family members were also pupils, automatically enter the same line.

=== Prefects ===
At the College, the head boy is known as the "Head of the Line". In recent years the "Second Head of the Line" has been de facto head girl. The heads of line lead the "Committee", a body of ten Rhetoric pupils. In the past this committee had the authority to mete out detentions and the writing out of the school rules to younger pupils who misbehave, however this is no longer practiced.

Other Rhetoricians are assigned roles as "Prefects", typically with responsibilities tied to a particular area of school life, e.g. Prefect of Music.

=== Discipline ===
Punishment

The school’s disciplinary structure includes several levels of sanction, the most serious being the Headmaster’s Detention. Below this is the Saturday Night Detention, supervised by the Deputy Headmaster for discipline (formerly "Assistant Headmaster"). Pupils are expected to turn out in suits and polished black shoes, whether boarder or day pupil. Departmental detentions and tasks may also be allotted as well as "sets", writing out the school rules. Pupils could also be given a "run" for a minor infraction, which would require them to change into gym kit and run up the Avenue to the Lady's statue and back again, a distance of about a mile, during either first rec (the mid-morning break) or before breakfast in the later years. A list of "runs" would be published on the Playroom bulletin board every day, and if a pupil was given more than one run in a day these would be converted into the more time-consuming "sets" instead.

Rewards

Stonyhurst formerly operated a “Brags” system, in which pupils earned awards for academic achievement recorded in their Studies Diary and reviewed weekly by their tutor. The name “Brag” derived from St Edmund Campion SJ’s Brag (a written declaration of faith). This system replaced an earlier Commendation scheme, in which teachers awarded certificates at their discretion.

=== The School Day ===
The year is split into three terms, Christmas, Easter and Summer, with the Christmas and Easter terms lasting approximately 14 weeks, and the Summer term lasting only around 8. The terms are broken up by a 1 or 2 week half-term holiday. Holidays are long - four weeks at Christmas and Easter and ten over the Summer. During term time, school takes place six days a week, beginning at 8.20am with assembly. On Monday mornings this is led by the headmaster and takes place in the Academy Room (currently the Boys' Chapel). On the other five days it takes place in each playroom and is led by the playroom master, apart from Thursdays, which is a whole-school singing practice to prepare for the Sunday mass. There are three lessons before first recreation at 10.35am. At 11.10am lessons resume until lunchtime (12.30 or 1.10 depending on the individual's timetable). On Mondays and Fridays games takes place at 11:30am following first recreation and are followed by lunch. The afternoon consists of 1 lesson, then a short recreation (3rd), before a final lesson from 3:50pm till 5:00pm. On Thursdays, CCF or voluntary service replaces games. On Wednesdays and Saturdays, games begin at 2.00 and there are no further classes. Study periods take place during the evenings (times vary according to playroom). Society events typically occur during the evening. Lights out varies according to playroom.

=== Uniform ===
In the early nineteenth century, the boys' uniform consisted of: a cap made of leather and fur, a blue swallow-tail coat with brass buttons, a red waistcoat, buff-coloured knee breaches and blue or grey stockings.

The present day school uniform is an amalgamation of various ideas that have been thrown together over the decades. Until the 1960s Stonyhurst did not have a uniform - there being no need as the fashion until then was very conservative. The first uniform introduced was a three piece charcoal grey suit with a green tie and white shirt. The green tie reflected the school colours (green and white). It was seen at the time that only grammar schools or preparatory schools had uniforms with striped ties and blazers embroidered with the school shield.

In the 1970s the uniform was changed to a black three piece suit for Sunday and a green tweed jacket with grey trousers for mid-week. At this stage the school tie was changed to red, as it was felt that a green jacket should not have a green tie. The colour red has no particular historical connection with Stonyhurst. Green ties could still be worn until the mid-1980s. The final changes to the uniform were introduced by Giles Mercer when Headmaster. He attached a gold St Omer's cross to the school tie. This is incorrect as the St Omer's cross is silver. The waistcoat from the Sunday uniform has disappeared.

The girl's uniform is based on the tartan of Charles Stewart ("Bonnie Prince Charles"). The College tartan is known as Lady Borrowdale's gift - a fragment of tartan worn by Bonnie Prince Charlie on his flight from Culloden across to Skye. One of the school's recent parents used the fragment as a template upon which to design the kilt that is now worn by the girls as part of their uniform, and which was also worn on the Queen's visit to the College in October 1990. It is believed that the Prince, indeed, has a pair of tartan trousers made from this bolt. The girls also wear an electric blue jumper under a green tweed jacket on the upper part of their body.

Today the uniform is as follows:

- Lower Line boys wear a green tweed jacket and black trousers, with a red tie emblazoned with the St Omer Cross.
- Higher Line boys wear suits of their choice.
- Lower Line girls wear skirts in the College tartan, known as Lady Borrowdale's gift and based on a fragment of tartan worn by Bonnie Prince Charlie on his flight from Culloden across to Skye, which is today among the collections in the Arundell Library. This tartan was also worn on the Queen's visit to the College in 1990. The Earl of Wessex who visited the college in 2006 is said to have a pair of trousers made from the same tartan.
- Higher Line girls wear suits with either trousers or skirts.

Blazers are awarded for full colours in sport, and ties for half colours or other achievements.

== Notable events in the school year ==
Ascensio Scholarum

The Ascensio Scholarum is inherited from the College of St Omer. In its present form, it is the opening address of the headmaster at the beginning of the year to the entire school gathered in the Academy Room. Previously, it was a formal transition for pupils from one playroom to the next at the beginning of the year. It involved a pupil from each year announcing to the playroom of the year below them that the next playroom had been vacated by the senior pupils. The students and their belongings would then move up to their next playroom. This is how it acquired the name, "the ascension of the school".

Campion Day

Campion Day is celebrated annually on the Feast of St Edmund Campion. The first period (lesson) of the day is as usual, but followed by Mass, for which Lower Line must change into suits. This is followed by a lunch which takes the form of a Christmas dinner for Lower Line. In the afternoon, pupils and staff are allowed to change into casual clothing and Rhetoric host the Rhetoric Fair in the Ambulacrum for the whole school, with stalls and entertainment, the proceeds from which go to the school's charity, Learning to Care. In the evening a formal dinner is held for Higher Line.

Poetry Banquet

The Poetry Banquet takes place in February in a marquee erected in the Ambulacrum. Poets donate raffle prizes and serve dinner to invited guests. At the end of which, they are free to join in the entertainment with their parents and friends, which features, among other things, performances from pupil bands. The proceeds from the evening largely fund the Stonyhurst Children's Holiday Trust week (see above, Religious Life).

Great Academies

Great Academies, although different in its present form, is a continuation of a tradition begun at St Omers. The first to take place at Stonyhurst was on 6 August 1795.

In 1810, it was marked by a twist of fate. The new Academy Room was to be inaugurated at the occasion on 7 August with the delivery of a prologue recalling memories from St Omers but it had to be called off: Thomas Weld, benefactor of the estate to the Jesuits had held a dinner as a treat to the boys in the Top Refectory on 31 July. After singing "I am mad Tom, behold me" at the boys' request, he complained of feeling unwell, and was assisted to his room, where he died in the early morning.

Today Great Academies weekend takes place annually at the end of the first half of the Summer Term. It is an occasion when the school is on display - there are exhibitions, musical performances, the school play, sporting events, as well as prize-giving and the headmaster's speech. It culminates with the Rhetoric ball and mass for Rhetoric pupils and their parents the following morning.

Rhetoric Ball

The Rhetoric Ball, a celebration for those in their final year, and about to sit their A-Levels, closes Great Academies. It is held, like the Poetry Banquet, in a marquee erected in the Ambulacrum. Rhetoricians are accompanied by their families and served dinner.

== Stonyhurst Chorus ==
Originally composed in 1894 to celebrate a century of happy settlement for the College in idyllic rural Lancashire, today, the Stonyhurst Chorus was sung each year following the Head of the Line's address at Rhetoric ball, which closed Great Academies. The first verse was sung by the Head chorister of the school and then the rest join in.

style="font-size:100%;"

Old Alma Mater, here's to thee!

Stonyhurst! Old Stonyhurst!

Long life and all prosperity!

Stonyhurst! Old Stonyhurst!

While generations come and go,

While boyhood doth to manhood grow,

Be aye the same we used to know,

Stonyhurst! Old Stonyhurst!

More bright be every coming year!

Stonyhurst! Old Stonyhurst!

More proud each step of thy career!

Stonyhurst! Old Stonyhurst!

And may thy sons that are to be

More worthy service bring to thee,

But not more loyal hearts than we,

Stonyhurst! Old Stonyhurst!

Thy sons in every land are known,

Stonyhurst! Old Stonyhurst!

In all they prove them for thine own,

Stonyhurst! Old Stonyhurst!

And borne across each distant main,

From every continent our strain

Shall come in echoes back again,

Stonyhurst! Old Stonyhurst!

Old college of the eagle towers,

Stonyhurst! Old Stonyhurst:

Thy honour shall through life be ours,

Stonyhurst! Old Stonyhurst!

Fresh triumphs give us year by year

Of study and of play to hear,

And back to thee return the cheer,

Stonyhurst! Old Stonyhurst!

L.D.S.

(Sung to the German melody 'Tannenbaum')

== Stonyhurst Parlance ==
Below is a sample of terms from Stonyhurst parlance. As in other public schools terms have been coined pertaining to various features of life in the school.

- Alaska: The name given to the accommodation detached from the other dormitories.
- Atramentarius: The Atramentarius (now obsolete) would be responsible for the maintenance of ink pots in the desks of each classroom.
- Bread Rooms: The English Department in what was once the College kitchen and bakery.
- Cacus: The Latin word for 'blind', used to denote to the window-less room created above Higher Line Common Room from part of the old Museum (obsolete now that the room has been extended to share the large windows with the common room below).
- Clang Corner: The name given to the area on the ground floor of New Wing where Poets congregate.
- Dungeons: The name given to the small, dark rooms occupied by Poetry boarders in the Shireburn Buildings.
- Lions: In the eighteenth century Lion statues stood at the main gate, which has been known as "The Lions" ever since. The original lions are thought to be those now in the Jesuit Gardens.
- Pipes: The radiators along the Upper Gallery are numbered owing to the 'pipes' system no longer used, where students would leave their work on the specified radiator for their teacher to collect and mark.
- The Plunge: The name given to the old swimming pool, now Lower Grammar and Grammar changing facilities and studies centre, and the recently completed Dance Studio, known as the "Old Gym".
- Quality Street: The name given to the better accommodation in the Front Quadrangle (now obsolete).
- Sewage Farm: The nickname given to the old Poetry Dormitories above the Top Refectory (now obsolete).
- The Snoring Dormitory: A special dormitory for snorers (now obsolete).

== See also ==
- College of St Omer
- Stonyhurst Saint Mary's Hall
- Hodder Place
- List of Stonyhurst Alumni/ae
- Roman Catholic Church
- Society of Jesus
- St Ignatius, founder of the Jesuits
- English Heritage
- Hurst Green
- Lancashire

== Sources ==
- Chadwick, Hubert, S.J. (1962). St Omers to Stonyhurst, Burns & Oats. No ISBN
- Muir, T.E. (1992). Stonyhurst College 1593-1993, James & James (Publishers) Ltd. ISBN 0-907383-32-7
- The Authorities of Stonyhurst College (1963), A Stonyhurst Handbook for Visitors and Others, Third edition
- Hewitson, A. (Preston, 1878), Stonyhurst College, Present and Past: Its History, Discipline, Treasures and Curiosities, Second edition
- Stonyhurst College website
