= Edward Knott =

English Jesuit controversialist

Edward Knott, real name Matthew Wilson (1582–1656) was an English Jesuit controversialist, twice provincial of the Society of Jesus in England.

== Life ==
He was born at Catchburn in the parish of Morpeth, Northumberland, After studying humanities in the college of the English Jesuits at St. Omer. he was on 10 October 1602 admitted an alumnus of the English College at Rome, under the assumed same of Edward Knott, which he retained through life. He was ordained priest on 27 March 1606. He entered the Society of Jesus on 2 October the same year, and upon the expiration of his novitiate in 1608 he was appointed penitentiary in Rome. For some time he was prefect of studies in the English College. He was raised to the rank of a professed father of the Society of Jesus on 30 September 1618.

During 1626 he was a missioner in the Suffolk district. He was apprehended in 1629, and was committed to the Clink prison in Southwark, but at the instance of queen Henrietta Maria's mother, Marie de' Medici, he was released and banished in January 1632 (ODNB). In 1633 he served in the London district, acting as vice-provincial to Richard Blount; in 1636 he was, in the same district, vice-provincial to Henry More, whom he succeeded as provincial of the English province in 1643. In that capacity he assisted at the eighth general congregation of the Society of Jesus, held in November 1645. Soon afterwards he returned to the English mission, and thenceforward resided for the most part in London. He was reappointed provincial on 23 March 1653, in succession to Father Francis Foster. He died in London on 4 January (O.S.) 1655–6, and was buried the next day in St. Pancras Church.

== Works ==
His works are:

- A Modest Briefe Discussion of some points taught by M. Doctour Kellison, in his Treatise of the Ecclesiasticall Hierarchy, Rouen, 1630. It appeared in Latin, Antwerp, 1631. This work against Matthew Kellison, which relates to the disputes between the secular and regular clergy, was published under the pseudonym of Nicholas Smith, and was composed by Knott in the Clink prison. Another reply to Kellison was published by Father John Floyd, and both these works were censured by the archbishop of Paris 30 January 1631, and by the Sorbonne 15 February 1631. Knott was attacked by an anonymous writer in a work entitled A Reply to M. Nicholas Smith, his Discussion of some pointes of M. Doctour Kellison his Treatise of the Hierarchie. By a Divine, Douay, 1630. A.B. justified Knott in A Defence of N. Smith against a Reply to his Discussion, &c., 1630. On 9 May 1631 Pope Urban VIII issued the brief Britannia, in which he lamented the divisions sown among the English Catholics, and commanded them to cease. But the controversy continued until the issue of Urban VIII's brief dated 19 March 1633.
- Charity Mistaken, with the want whereof Catholickes are unjustlv charged, for affirming as they do with grief, that Protestancy unrepented destroyes Salvation [London], 1630. This was answered by Christopher Potter in his Want of Charity justly charged, Oxford, 1633; 2nd edit. 1634.
- Mercy and Truth, or Charity maintayned by Catholykes, a reply to Potter [St. Omer], 1634. William Chillingworth subsequently replied to the first part of this work in The Religion of Protestants, 1638.
- A Direction to be observed by N. N. [William Chillingworth] if hee means to proceeds in answering the booke entitled "Mercy and Truth, London, 1636. Knott, who had heard of Chillingworth's intention to reply to Mercy and Truth, here sought to put his adversary out of court by accusing him of Socinianism.
- Christianity Maintained; or, A Discouery of sundry Doctrines tending to the Ouerthrowe of Christian Religion: Contained in the Answere to a Booke entituled, "Mercy and Truth" [St. Omer], 1638, (anon.) The dedication to Charles I is signed I. H.
- Infidelity Unmasked, or the Confutation of Chillingworth's "Religion of Protestants," Ghent, 1652. Thomas Smith (translator and controversialist) replied to this in The Judgment of an University-man concerning Mr. Knot's last book against Mr. Chillingworth (a preface to his translation of Jean Daillé's Apologia for the Reformed Churches, Cambridge, 1653), described by Knott himself as a "witty, erudite, and solid work".
- Protestancy Condemned by the expressed verdict and sentence of Protestants (anon.), Douay, 1664.
- Monita utilissima pro patribus Missionis Anglicanae. Never printed.

== Notes ==
Catholic Church titles
Preceded by Henry More	Provincial superior of the English; Province of the Society of Jesus; 1641/2/3-1645/6	Succeeded by Henry Bedingfield
Preceded by Francis Foster/Forster	Provincial superior of the English; Province of the Society of Jesus; 22 March 1653-4 January 1656	Succeeded by Richard Bradshaigh
