= Thomas Holland (Jesuit) =

English Jesuit priest and Catholic martyr (1600–1642)

Blessed Thomas Holland SJ
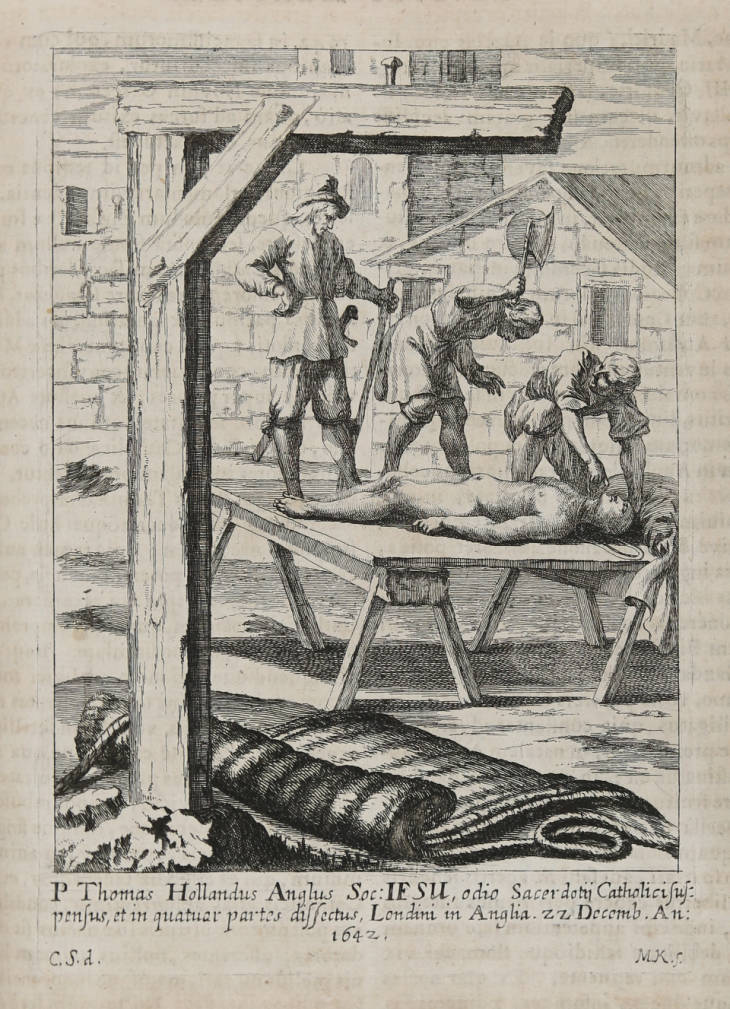
- Thomas Holland is quartered at Tyburn

Martyr
- Born: c. 1600; Sutton, Lancashire
- Died: 12 December 1642 (aged 41 - 42); Tyburn, London, England
- Honored in: Roman Catholic Church
- Beatified: 15 December 1929 by Pope Pius XI
- Feast: 12 December

Thomas Holland, SJ (1600 at Sutton, Lancashire – executed 12 December 1642 at Tyburn) was an English Jesuit priest. He is a Catholic martyr, beatified in 1929.

== Life ==
Holland was born in Lancashire, possibly son of Richard Holland, gentleman. He attended the English College at St. Omer's and subsequently in August, 1621, went to the English College, Valladolid. When the abortive negotiations for the "Spanish Match" were taking place in 1623, Holland was sent to Madrid to assure Prince Charles of the loyalty of the seminarists of Valladolid, which he did in a Latin oration.

In 1624 he entered the novitiate of the Society of Jesus at Watten in the Southern Netherlands, and not long after was ordained to priesthood at Liège. He took the missionary oath 29 December 1633 and served as minister at Ghent and prefect at St. Omer's, where he acquired the nickname, bibliotheca pietatis ("Library of Piety") because of his vast knowledge of the ascetical life.

He made his solemn religious profession as spiritual coadjutor at Ghent (28 May 1634) and was sent on the English mission the following year, in hopes that the change might improve his health.

Holland suffered from poor health during the whole of the seven years he spent in active ministry in his native England. He worked in London, sometimes assuming the aliases of Saunderson and Hammond. He was an adept in disguising himself, and could speak perfect French, Spanish, and Flemish. He had to stay indoors during the day and only travel at night because of the priest-hunters. His health did not improve.

He was eventually arrested on suspicion in a London street returning from a sick call, 4 October 1642, and committed to the New Prison. He was afterwards transferred to Newgate, and arraigned at the Old Bailey, 7 December, for being a priest. There was no conclusive evidence as to this; but as he refused to swear he was not, the jury found him guilty, to the indignation of the Lord Mayor, Isaac Penington, and another member of the bench named Garroway. On Saturday, 10 December, Sergeant Peter Phesant, presumably acting for the recorder, passed sentence on him. On his return to prison Holland heard many confessions.

Some Capuchin friends smuggled in supplies so he could celebrate Mass one last time. Soon after his last Mass he was taken off to execution. There he was allowed to make a speech and to say many prayers, and when the cart was turned away, he was left to hang till he was dead.

The Hesburgh Libraries at the University of Notre Dame holds a first edition of Ambrose Corbie’s Certamen Triplex (1645), a rare contemporary account of the martyrdoms of Holland, Ralph Corbie (1598-1644) and Henry Morse (1595-1645).
