= National Congenital Heart Disease Audit =

The National Congenital Heart Disease Audit (NCHDA), formerly called the Central Cardiac Audit Database, is a database established in 2000 for quality assurance purposes, to monitor the outcome for an individual who has undergone cardiac treatment. It comprises six national heart disease audits. Each audit enables health professionals to continually measure and improve care by comparing their work to specific standards and national trend. These audits from 2011 are part of the National Institute for Cardiovascular Outcomes Research formerly at University College London and in April 2015 moved to St. Bartholomew's Hospital.

== Audits ==
The following audits are available within the CCAD:

- Adult cardiac interventions
- Cardiac rhythm management
- Adult cardiac surgery
- Congenital heart disease
- Heart failure
- Myocardial infarction (MINAP)
