= Thomas Smith (translator and controversialist) =

Thomas Smith (c. 1624 - 27 Sept 1661) was an English scholar, translator, and controversialist, fellow of Christ's College, Cambridge, and University Librarian from 1659 to his death.

== Life ==
He was the son of Thomas Smith, born in London in 1623 or 1624. He studied at St Paul's school, and was admitted sizar of Christ's College on 26 March 1640, at the age of 1640. He took a BA in 1644, an MA in 1647, and a BD in 1654. He was made vicar of Caldecote, South Cambridgeshire in 1650, and University Librarian in 1659, holding the latter post until his death from an epidemic on 27 September 1661.

He engaged in controversies with the Quaker George Fox, and against John Bunyan. He was a collaborator and corrector in the press of the "London" Polyglot Bible of Bishop Brian Walton.

== Works ==
- Life and Death of William More, 1660 (William More was his predecessor as University Librarian).
- Translated John Daillé's Apology for the Reformed Churches, Cambridge, 1653, with a preface, The judgment of a University-man concerning Mr. Knot's last book against Mr. Chillingworth, responding to Edward Knott's Infidelity Unmasked, part of a long sequence of Anglican—Catholic controversial works, the preceding of which was William Chillingworth's famous Religion of Protestants.
