= Richard Bradshaigh =

Richard Bradshaigh or Bradshaw (alias Barton, 1602–1669), was an English Jesuit.

== Biography ==
Bradshaigh was born in Lancashire in 1602. He was educated in the English college at Rome and entered the Society of Jesus in 1625.

Bradshaigh became a professed father in 1640 and rector of the English college at Liège in 1642. He was Provincial of the English province (1656–60) during the great political change in the collapse of the English Commonwealth and the restoration of the monarchy. He was rector of the English college at Saint-Omer from 1660 till his death on 12 February 1669.

== Works ==
Dodd ascribes to him a work on the Nullity of the Protestant Clergy in reply to Archbishop Bramhall, but the correctness of this statement has been questioned. Some interesting letters written by him in 1660 to Father General Nickell upon English affairs.

== Notes ==
Catholic Church titles
Preceded by Edward Knott	Provincial superior of the English; Province of the Society of Jesus; 25 April 1656-15 July 1660	Succeeded by Edward Courtney
