= Lycée Alexandre Ribot =

School in Saint-Omer, Pas-de-Calais, France

Coordinates: 50.7481°N 2.25874°E

The Lycée Alexandre Ribot (English: /riːˈboʊ/ ree-BOH, French: [lise alɛksɑ̃dʁ ʁibo]) is a school located at 42 rue Gambetta, in the town of Saint-Omer (Pas-de-Calais département), France. Founded as a Walloon Jesuit college in 1565 (the English College was founded nearby by English Jesuits in 1593), it has been a lycée since 1848. It was named in honor of its former student Alexandre Ribot in 1924.

The main courtyard of the Lycée Alexandre Ribot.

After the Jesuits were forced to leave France in the mid-18th century, another religious order continued the tradition of religious education in the town. Following the French Revolution, during which the Saint Omer schools had remained closed, a new school was founded on the former Jesuit site. Until 1946 it was the only state-run lycée in the entire Pas-de-Calais département.

Some of the school buildings date back to before the 20th century, including the building housing the female students' boarding quarters. This dates back to the 17th century, when it was originally an episcopal seminary. The Lycée's post-Baccalauréat students follow classes in the Bâtiment Coste, part of the former English College. Dating back to the 18th century, it was also adapted for a time as a military hospital, and used by the German occupying forces during the Occupation of France.

The current Proviseur or Principal of the Lycée Alexandre Ribot (since September 2026) is Monsieur Jérôme Gannard. The school roll currently stands at around 1300 students, who prepare for either the General or Technological forms of the Baccalauréat or vocational post-Baccalauréat qualifications. Some students (about 100) are part of the Lycée's "European Section", in which one hour per week of the History-Geography programme is taught in English. An exchange link with Emmanuel City Technology College, Gateshead, Tyne and Wear, England was established in 2000.

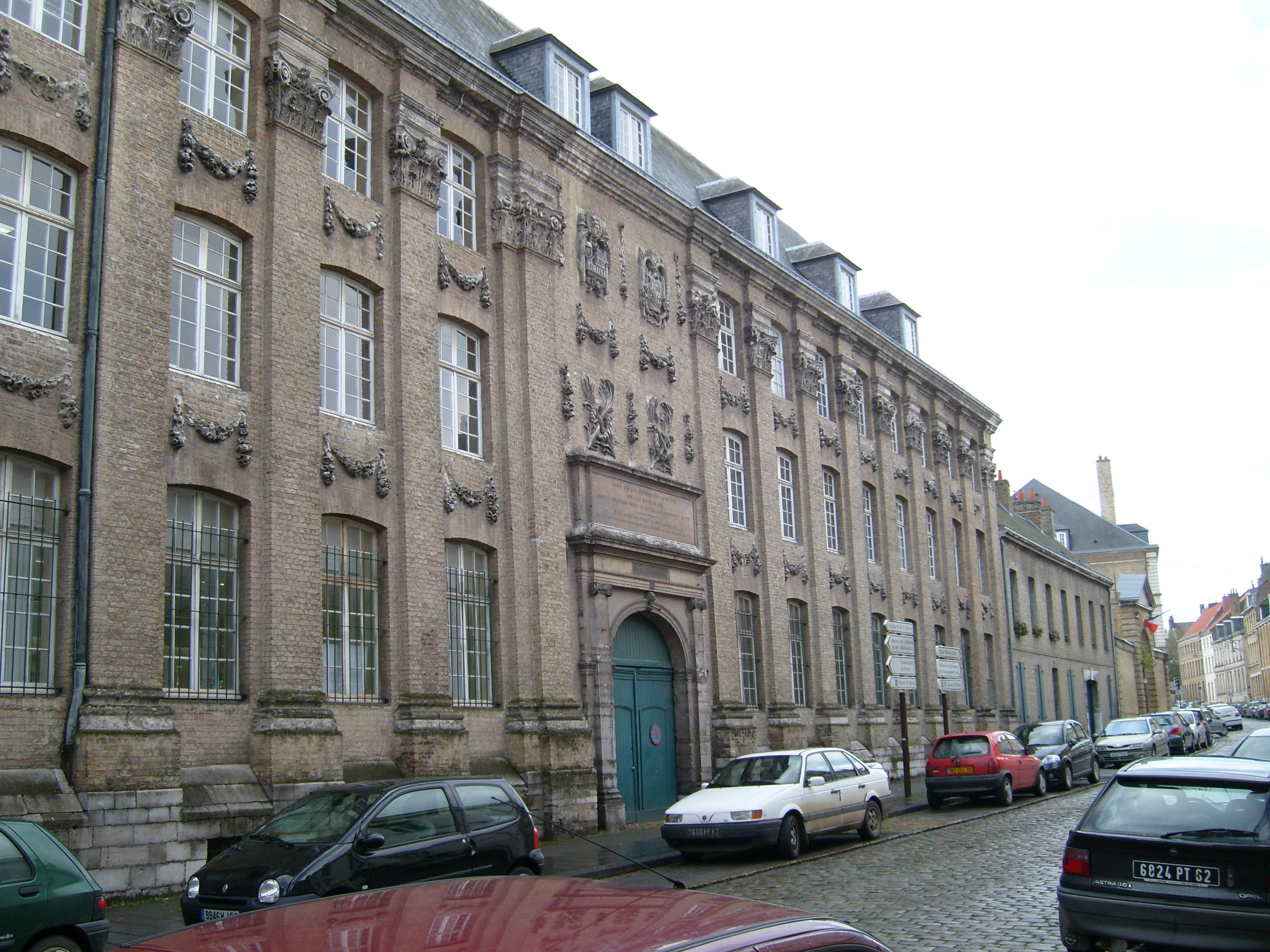
The English College, Lycée Alexandre Ribot, Saint Omer.

== See also ==
- Colleges of St Omer, Bruges and Liège
- List of Jesuit sites
