= Nathaniel Elliot =

English Jesuit scholar (1705–1780)

Nathaniel Elliot or Sheldon (1705–1780), was an English Jesuit scholar.

== Life ==
Elliot was born 1 May 1705. He entered the Society of Jesus, or Jesuits, in 1723 and was admitted to the profession of the four vows in 1741. He adopted the alias of Sheldon, his aunt Mary Anne, daughter of John Elliot, esq., of Gatacre Park, Shropshire, being the wife of Ralph Sheldon, esq., of Beoley, Worcestershire. In October 1748 he was appointed rector of the English College at St. Omer, having been previously socius to the provincial, Henry Sheldon, his cousin; and from 1756 to 1762 he was rector of the English College at Rome. In 1766 he became rector of the Greater College, Bruges, and later in the same year he was nominated provincial of his order in England. While holding this office he resided in the family of Mr. Nevill at Holt, Leicestershire, where he died on 10 October 1780.

== Writings ==
The Occasional Letters on the Affairs of the Jesuits in France was collected and published under his direction, together with The Judgment of the Bishops of France concerning the Doctrine, Government, Conduct, and Usefulness of the French Jesuits (1763). He also made a translation of Giovanni Pietro Pinamonti's treatise on The Cross in its True Light; or, the Weight of Tribulation lessened (1775)"COPAC Brief Records". COPAC.
