= Maurice Ewens =

Maurice Ewens, alias Newport (1611–1687) was an English Jesuit and author.

== Life ==
Son of John Ewens and his wife, Elizabeth Keynes, he was born in Somerset in 1611. After studying humanities in the College of the English Jesuits at St. Omer, he entered the English College at Rome for higher studies, 18 October 1628. He was ordained priest at Rome 13 November 1634, and left the college for Belgium, by leave of the pope, 26 April 1635, in order to join the Society of Jesus. He was admitted at Watten, near St. Omer, the same year, under the assumed name of Maurice Newport, by which he was known. On 23 November 1643 he was professed of the four vows.

After a course of teaching in the College of St. Omer, Ewens was sent to the English mission, and stationed in the Hampshire district in 1644. Subsequently, he went to the Devon and Oxford districts, and finally in the London district, of which he was declared rector 17 May 1666. There he remained till the time of the alleged Popish Plot (1678–9), when he left for Belgium. For some years he resided in the Jesuit colleges at Ghent and Liège, but eventually he returned to London, where he died on 4 December 1687.

== Works ==
He was the author of a congratulatory Latin poem Votum Candidum, dedicated to Charles II, London, 1665; 2nd edit., emendatior, London, 1669; 3rd edit., ab autore recognita, London, 1676; 4th edit., London, 1679, under the title of Ob pacem toti fere Christiano orbi mediante Carolo II … redditam, ad eundem sereniss. principem Carmen Votivum. At the end of the third edition is an additional poem on the birth, to James, Duke of York and Mary, Duchess of York, of their infant son Charles, who died in December 1677.

Newport also wrote a manuscript treatise, De Scientiâ Dei, preserved in the library at Salamanca; and George Oliver conjectured that he was the author of A Golden Censer full with the pretious Incense to the Praisers of Saints, Paris, 1654, dedicated to Queen Henrietta Maria.

== Notes ==
Attribution

This article incorporates text from a publication now in the public domain: Lee, Sidney, ed. (1894). "Newport, Maurice". Dictionary of National Biography. Vol. 40. London: Smith, Elder & Co.
