= Thomas Percy Plowden =

British Jesuit

Thomas Percy Plowden (born at Shiplake, Oxfordshire, England, 1672; died at Watten, 21 September 1745) was an English Jesuit administrator.

== Life ==
He joined the Society of Jesus in 1693. He was rector of the English College, Rome, 1731–34; superior at Ghent, 1735–39; and rector of the College of St. Omer, 1739-42.

He translated Paolo Segneri's Devout Client of the Blessed Virgin, and wrote the preface to it. He died at the novitiate of Watten.
