= Ambrose Corbie =

English Jesuit, teacher and author (1604–1649)

Ambrose Corbie, also called Corby or Corbington (7 December 1604 – 11 April 1649) was an English Jesuit, teacher and author.

== Biography ==
Ambrose Corbie was born near Durham, England, the fourth son of Gerald Corbie and his wife, Isabella (née Richardson), recusant Roman Catholics. Of their children, sons Ambrose, Ralph and Robert, became Jesuit priests (Richard died as a student at Saint-Omer) and their two surviving daughters, Mary and Catherine, became Benedictine nuns in Brussels.

Gerald Corbie entered the Society of Jesus as a lay brother in 1628, having brought his own father Ralph (aged 100) back to Catholicism. Gerald Corbie died in Watten, Nord on 17 September 1637. Isabella Corbie was professed a Benedictine at Ghent and died a centenarian on 25 December 1652.

Ambrose, aged 12, entered St-Omer and, in 1622, the Venerable English College in Rome. He entered the Society of Jesus in Watten in 1627, and in 1641 was professed. Having taught with some success for some years at St-Omers, and been minister at Ghent in 1645, he was appointed confessor at the English college, Rome, where he died, aged 44.

== Writings ==
His works include:

- Certamen Triplex, etc., the history of the killing of three English Jesuit priests: Thomas Holland, his own brother Ralph Corbie, and Henry Morse (Antwerp, 1645, 12mo), with three engraved portraits; reprinted, Munich, 1646, 12mo); English translation by E. T. Scargill under the title of "The Threefold Conflict" etc.; ed. W. T. Turnbull (London, 1858, 8vo).
- Account of his family; English version in Henry Foley, Records of the English Province of the Society of Jesus, III, 64.
- Vita et morte del Fratello Tomaso Stilintono [i.e. Stillington alias Olgethorpe] novitio Inglese della Compagnia de Gesu morto in Messina, 15 Sept., 1617; (manuscript at Stonyhurst College; see Hist. MSS. Comm.)
