= Richard Blount (priest) =

Richard Blount, S.J.
- Born: 1565; Leicestershire, England
- Died: 1638 (aged 72–73); London, England
- Occupation: priest

Richard Blount, S.J. (1565–1638) was an English priest and the first Jesuit Provincial of England after the Elizabethan Laws were passed.

== Biography ==
=== Early life ===
Richard was born into the Leicestershire branch of the Blount Family in 1565. He attended school at Balliol College, Oxford. Afterward he went to Trinity for his university studies, but left shortly after arriving having converted to Catholicism. He travelled to the English College at Douai in the Spanish Netherlands, arriving on 22 July 1583. The college was temporarily in Rheims due to ongoing conflict in Douai. In 1584 he continued on to the English College, Rome.

=== Priesthood ===
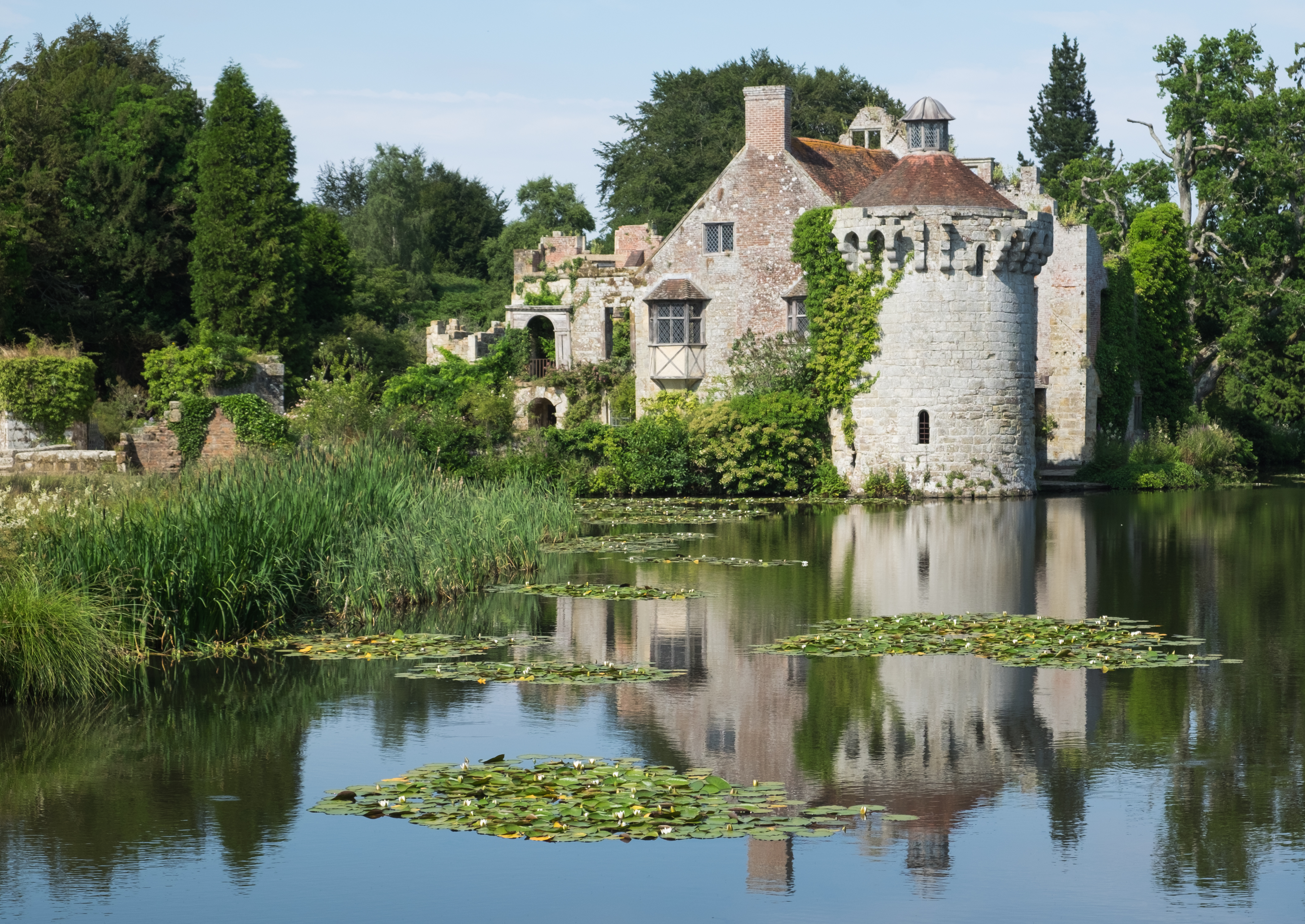
Old Scotney Castle

After five years at the English College in Rome, Blount was ordained a priest in 1589. He worked with Father Robert Parsons, S.J. to smuggle himself back into England in 1591 posing as returning sailor prisoners-of-war from the failed expedition against Spain by the Earl of Essex. He was taken before the Lord High Admiral Howard of Effingham to present his story. His knowledge of the events and of seamanship were good enough for him to pass and be allowed back into England.

He worked as a priest in hiding based out of Scotney Castle in Kent. Catholic recusant Thomas Darell hid Blount, in the castle while he ministered to Roman Catholics from 1591 to 1598. Catholicism was then illegal in England, and during a second raid by authorities, Blount to fled over a wall into the moat and escaped. He also stayed at Mapledurham House in Oxfordshire. Richard Blount and another priest ran a successful mission to Berkshire, Oxfordshire and Northamptonshire from the house. The house was indeed raided on several occasions, but no-one was caught there. Blount used the alias of "Randall", and "R. Dagger".

At Michaelmas 1604, he attended a clandestine meeting at White Webbs near Enfield Chase, a house rented by Henry Garnet, and periodically used by the Jesuits for meetings.

=== English Jesuit Provincial ===
In 1617, Blount was selected as Superior of the English mission of the Society. As Superior he took on the yoke of leadership of the English Jesuits. At the time there were approximately 200 Jesuits, 109 of which were in hiding in England.

In 1619, the Pope made England a trial province. Identification as a province indicated that the area covered had stability and permanence. Blount was appointed to the highest leadership position in a trial province, Vice-Provincial. Blount's task as Vice-Provincial was to organise the province for further validation at the next meeting of the Society of Jesus leadership. Blount organised five fictional colleges in London, Lancashire, Suffolk, Leicestershire and Wales.

His work was recognised by the Order leadership and England was made a full Province of the Society with Blount as the first Provincial superior. Blount was the Provincial of the English Province of the Society of Jesus until 11 August 1635, when he was succeeded by Henry More, S.J.

=== Death and afterward ===
Richard Blount, S.J. died in London, on 13 May 1638. He was given a requiem in the private chapel of Henrietta Maria, Queen consort of England, Scotland and Ireland, and a devout Catholic from France.

== Published works ==
Consultation entitled "Objections answered touching Maryland", drafted by Father R Blount, S.J., in 1632 (B. Johnston, "Foundation of Maryland", etc., 1883, 29)

Catholic Church titles
Preceded by Robert Jones	Vice-Prefect of the English; Mission of the Society of Jesus residing in England; 1617-1619	Succeeded by Himself; As Vice-Provincial
Preceded by Himself; As Vice-Prefect	Vice-Provincial of the English; Province of the Society of Jesus; 1619-21 January 1623	Succeeded by Himself; As Provincial
Preceded by Himself; As Vice-Provincial	Provincial superior of the English; Province of the Society of Jesus; 21 January 1623-1635	Succeeded by Henry More
