= Henry More (Jesuit) =

Henry More (1586–1661) was an English Jesuit provincial and church historian.

== Biography ==
Henry More was the son of Edward More, and great-grandson of Thomas More, lord chancellor of England. He was born in 1586 in Essex, according to the majority of the provincial catalogues, though a few of them give Cambridgeshire as the county of his birth. More made his humanity studies in the college of the English Jesuits at St. Omer, and entered the novitiate of St. John's, Louvain, 19 November 1607. His higher studies were probably made in Spain.

In 1614, More filled the office of minister in the English college of St. Alban at Valladolid; he held the same office in the college at St. Omer in 1621; and he was professed of the four vows on 12 May 1622. From 1622 until 1632, he was a missioner in the London district.

More was one of the Jesuits arrested at the Clerkenwell residence by the officers of the privy council in March 1628. In 1632, he was in confinement in the New Prison, London, and was released in December 1633. He then became chaplain to John Petre at Ingatestone and Thorndon Hall, Essex. In 1635, More was declared provincial superior of his order. Again imprisoned, he was set free in July 1640.

In 1642, More was vice-provincial of the order, residing in London, and acting for Matthew Wilson, the provincial, who was absent in Belgium. In 1645, he was rector of the college of St. Ignatius, which comprised the London district. He became rector of the college at St. Omer, and in 1655 he was again residing in Essex. In 1657, he was for the second time rector of the college at St. Omer, and he died at Watten, near that city, on 8 December 1661.

== Works ==
During these latter years he wrote his history of the English Jesuits: Historia Missionis Anglicanæ, ab anno MDLXXX ad MDCXXXV (St. Omer, 1660, fol.).

Besides translating Jerome Platus's Happiness of the Religious State (1632), and the Manual of Meditations by Thomas de Villa Castin (1618), he wrote Vita et Doctrina Christi Domini in meditationes quotidianas per annum digesta (Antwerp, 1649), followed by an English version, entitled, Life and Doctrines of our Saviour Jesus Christ (Ghent, 1656, in two parts; London, 1880).

Catholic Church titles
Preceded by Richard Blount	Provincial superior of the English; Province of the Society of Jesus; 1635-1641/2/3	Succeeded by Edward Knott
