= Myocardial Ischaemia National Audit Project =

The Myocardial Ischaemia National Audit Project (MINAP) (previously known as the "Myocardial Infarction National Audit Database") began in late 1998 when a broadly based steering group developed a dataset for acute myocardial infarction (AMI). This allowed clinicians to examine the management of myocardial infarction within their hospitals against targets specified by the National Service Framework (NSF) for coronary heart disease. The audit project produces annual reports on "How the NHS manages heart attacks" to show the performance of hospitals, ambulance services and cardiac networks in England and Wales against national standards and targets for the care of heart attack patients.

MINAP recently changed its name to reflect the importance of all acute coronary syndromes. Quarterly reports are available for hospitals, strategic health authorities, and the Department of Health. MINAP provided thrombolysis data to the Healthcare Commission for their Annual Health Check. MINAP provides data to ambulance services to help monitor patient outcomes and support improvements in training and care delivery. MINAP also provides data to cardiac networks to support service improvement. MINAP is the first national audit to release annual reports showing hospital performance against NSF targets in the public domain which are available below. Sustained improvement of performance against NSF targets for thrombolysis and use of secondary prevention medication has been demonstrated since the end of 2000.
