= Marmaduke Stone =

English Jesuit during the Suppression

The Very Reverend Marmaduke Stone SJ
- Elected: Provincial of England, Scotland and Ireland
- Installed: 1803
- Term ended: 1812
- Predecessor: vacant

Orders
- Ordination: 1775

Personal details
- Born: Marmaduke Stone; 28 November 1748 Draycott in the Moors, Staffordshire, England
- Died: 22 August 1834 (aged 85) Lowe House, St Helen's
- Buried: Wendelsham Abbey
- Denomination: Roman Catholic
- Occupation: priest, teacher, administrator
- Education: College of St Omer
- Alma mater: English Academy at Liège

Marmaduke Stone (28 November 1748 – 22 August 1834) was an English Jesuit, who brought to an end the two hundred year exile of English Jesuits in Europe. He achieved this not only while war had broken out between France and England, but also at a time when the Society of Jesus was suppressed in most of Europe and its colonies.

== Early life ==
Marmaduke Stone was born in Draycott near Painsley, Staffordshire into a recusant family and educated at St. Omer in northern France. At that time, Catholic education was not permitted in Britain. His education was interrupted when the entire school was forced to decamp to Bruges Austrian Netherlands on 10–17 August 1762, due to sudden French restrictions put on the order. Stone entered the Society of Jesus in 1767 in Ghent, and studied at the Liège Academy.

== Career ==
In 1774, he was appointed Master of Elements at the recently established English Academy at Liège. In 1775, he was ordained priest and remained on the staff of the Academy. In 1790 he succeeded William Strickland SJ who had become procurator in London, as president of the Academy. With his assistance Stone led the English "ex-Jesuits" through more than twenty testing years. Stone's brethren, though bound together by a common vocation and their still un-cancelled Jesuit vows, were not allowed by the papal brief of suppression to reunite for purposes of governance in their province. Stone could therefore only rule by appealing to conscience. When dealing with bishops, he could claim no rights, especially those essential to religious bodies. Fortunately, they were not hostile, although their views on Jesuit property and privileges caused Stone much trouble.

Owing to the great generosity of Thomas Weld of Lulworth, on 14 July 1794, the college at Liège was transferred to his estate at Stonyhurst in Lancashire. Despite the challenges involved, the upper and lower schools and the Academy reopened on 22 October 1794. A Rescript from the Roman Propaganda on 14 February 1796 confirmed Stonyhurst in all the ecclesiastical privileges of the Academy at Liège. Since a restoration of the Society during the French Revolutionary Wars was unlikely, it was resolved to work for an affiliation with the Russian province of the Jesuits, whom the 1773 suppression did not affect and whose corporate existence had been recognised in Rome. The approach was successful. On 19 May 1803, allied to the Russian province of the Society and having repeated his profession, Marmaduke Stone was declared provincial, and admitted the other Liège Jesuits to their vows, for England, Ireland, and Maryland. On 29 September a novitiate was opened at Hodder Place. While The Holy See gave no public recognition of the restored order, Pope Pius VII did privately express his pleasure. The Bull of Restoration of the entire Society finally came on 7 August 1814. On 2 December 1816 an interpretation was added stating it was to apply only where the secular government concurred. in England, therefore, the Jesuits retained their status quo.

Since its transfer to England the college had grown enormously and the Jesuit missions had prospered. In spite of his advancing years, Stone continued to act as college minister till 1827, when he finally retired to St Helens. The news that the Roman Catholic Relief Act 1829 had come into force giving the English Jesuits formal recognition, reached him there in 1829. He died in St Helens in 1834 and was buried in nearby Windleshaw Abbey.

== Bibliography ==
- Correspondence at Stonyhurst and elsewhere;
- Gerard, Stonyhurst College (1894);
- Henry Foley, Records of the English Province of the Society of Jesus, vii, 741;
- Ward, The Dawn of the Catholic Revival (London, 1909);
- ____, The Eve of Catholic Emancipation (London, 1912).
