= Ralph Corbie =

Irish Jesuit martyred in England (1598–1644)

Blessed Ralph Corbie S.J.
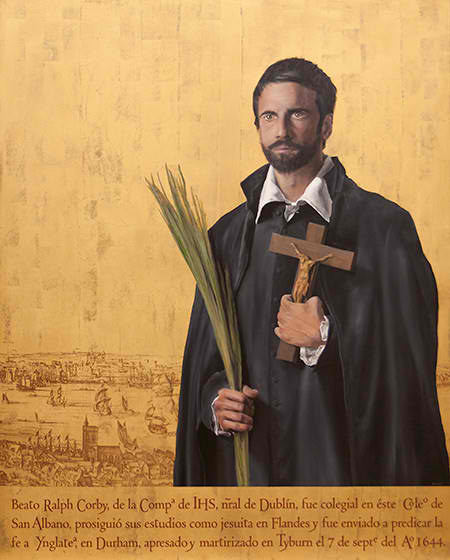
- Portrait at the Royal English College in Valladolid

Priest and Martyr
- Born: 25 March 1598; Dublin, Ireland
- Died: 7 September 1644 (aged 46); Tyburn, London, England
- Venerated in: Roman Catholic Church
- Beatified: 15 December 1929 by Pope Pius XI
- Feast: 7 September (individual) and 29 October (one of the Douai Martyrs)
- Attributes: martyr's palm, crucifix, noose in neck, knife in chest

Ralph Corbie, SJ (Corby, Corbington, at times Corrington; 25 March 1598 – 7 September 1644) was an Irish Jesuit. A victim of the anti-Catholic persecutions following the Reformation, he was beatified in 1929.

== Life ==
Corbie was born near Dublin. His parents were from Durham and returned to England when Ralph was about five years of age. A brother of Ambrose Corbie, he spent his childhood in the north of England. Then going overseas he studied at Saint-Omer, Seville, and the English College, Valladolid; where he was ordained. Having become a Jesuit about 1626, he came to England about 1631, where he was known by the name of "Carlington". He worked at Durham for about twelve years.

He was seized by the Parliamentarians at Hamsterley, 8 July 1644, when clothed in his Mass vestments, conveyed to London, and committed to Newgate Prison (22 July) with John Duckett, a secular priest. At their trial (Old Bailey, 4 September), they both admitted their priesthood, were condemned to death. Corbie was a Jesuit and the Society tried to save him. When the pardon finally arrived, Corbie insisted that Duckett use it, since he was younger. But John refused. Both were condemned to death. and executed at Tyburn, 7 September. He was hanged until dead, then disemboweled and quartered.

Stonyhurst has a relic of Father Corbie.
