= Colleges of St Omer, Bruges and Liège =

- Spanish Netherlands

Information
- Type: Roman Catholic (Jesuits)
- Established: 1593 (St Omer), 1762 (Bruges), 1773 (Liège)
- Founded by: Father Robert Parsons SJ
- Succeeded by: Stonyhurst College

The Colleges of St Omer, Bruges and Liège were successive expatriate institutions for Roman Catholic higher education run by the Jesuits for English students.

Founded in 1593 by Robert Parsons as the college of Saint-Omer in Artois (then part of the Spanish Netherlands), in the 18th century the college was twice forced to relocate, due to the suppression of the Jesuit order in France.

In 1762 most masters and students moved to Bruges and in 1773 on to Liège, leaving a smaller college surviving in St Omer. In 1794, those in Liège migrated a third and final time to Stonyhurst in England, founding Stonyhurst College.

== Foundation ==
Fr Robert Parsons SJ

During the reign of Elizabeth I, religious education for Roman Catholics was subject to penal legislation in England. English members of the Church of Rome created colleges in continental Europe to make up for this, the English College, Douai, the English College in Rome, the English College, Valladolid, and others at Madrid and Seville, but these were primarily for training priests. In particular, the Douai college was associated with the faculty of theology of the University of Douai.

Robert Parsons (1546–1610), had been instrumental in founding the college at Valladolid, but recognised a need for a school for young laymen. Saint-Omer was chosen as a site conveniently close to England, just 24 miles from Calais, and ruled by Catholic Spain as part of Flanders. It was also near the University of Douai, where Catholic scholars had edited and published the Douay–Rheims Bible.

The college was founded in 1593 as the English Jesuit College at St Omer in Flanders (in Spanish Netherlands) (although an alternative tradition dates the founding to 1592). In 1599, it gained the direct patronage of King Philip III of Spain. After an initial period of growth and prosperity, the unrest caused by the English Civil War resulted in a decline in students being sent from England, and the number dropped to as low as 24 in 1645. When stability returned to the English government, the school regained students and revived its programs.

== French rule ==
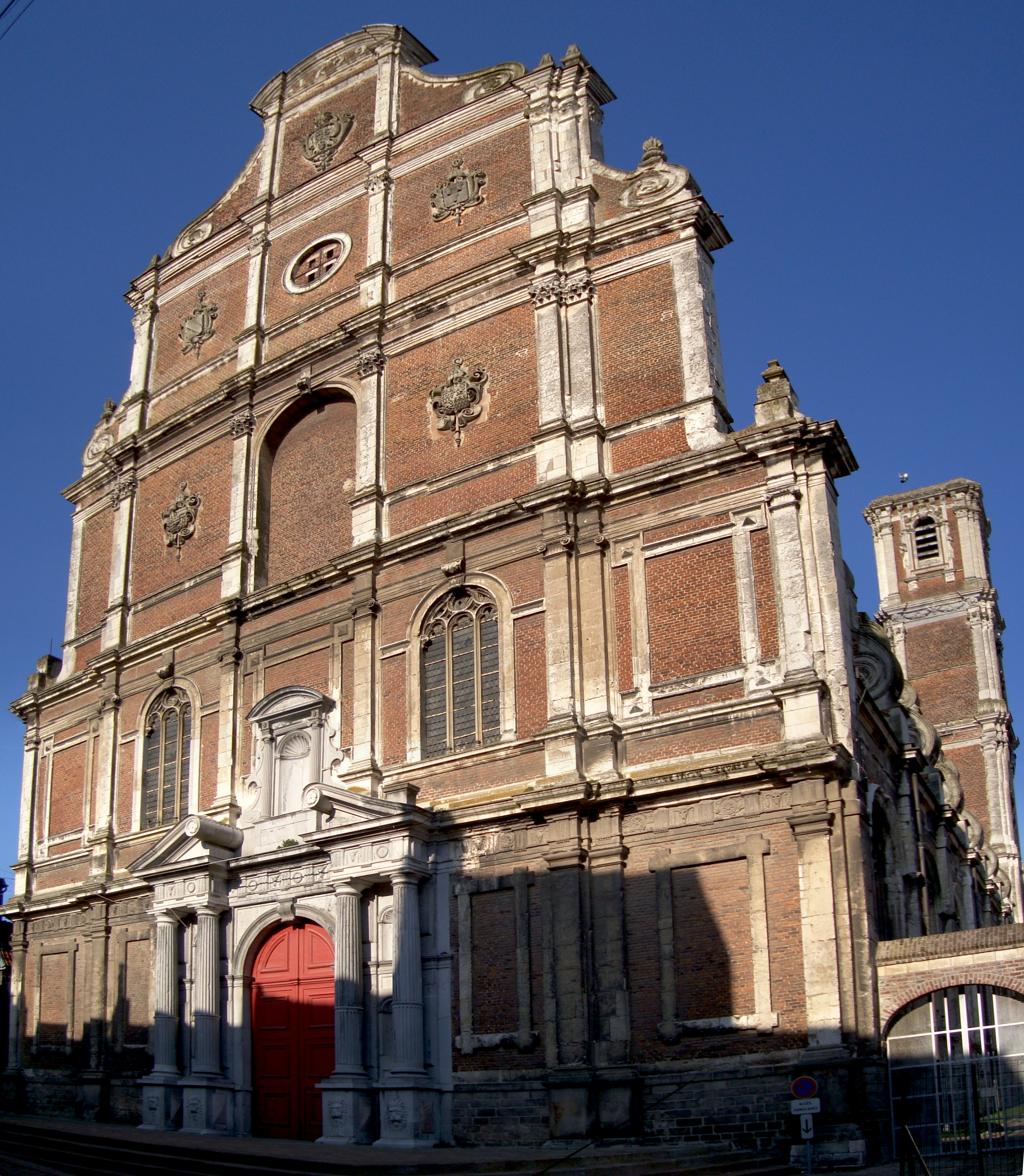
Saint-Omer College English Jesuit chapel

In 1678 Spain formally ceded St Omer and much of the province of Artois to France. The Catholic French monarchy was as friendly to the school as the Spanish crown had been before. As the eighteenth century began, two fires ravaged the town and the university, but each time it was rebuilt, and even expanded. Buildings from the second reconstruction in the 1720s remained in use into the twentieth century. They were used during World War I as a military hospital.

The college enjoyed its greatest period of prosperity from around 1720 to 1762. During the period when formal sworn affiliation with the Church of England was required for students to attend Oxford and Cambridge, St Omer provided higher education for several generations of English Catholics. Since the colleges founded in the American colonies were also affiliated with the Anglican and Protestant churches, the wealthier Catholic families (initially primarily from Maryland) sent their young men to St Omer to be educated. This included some students who were from Maryland indigenous tribes.

== Bruges, Liège, Stonyhurst ==
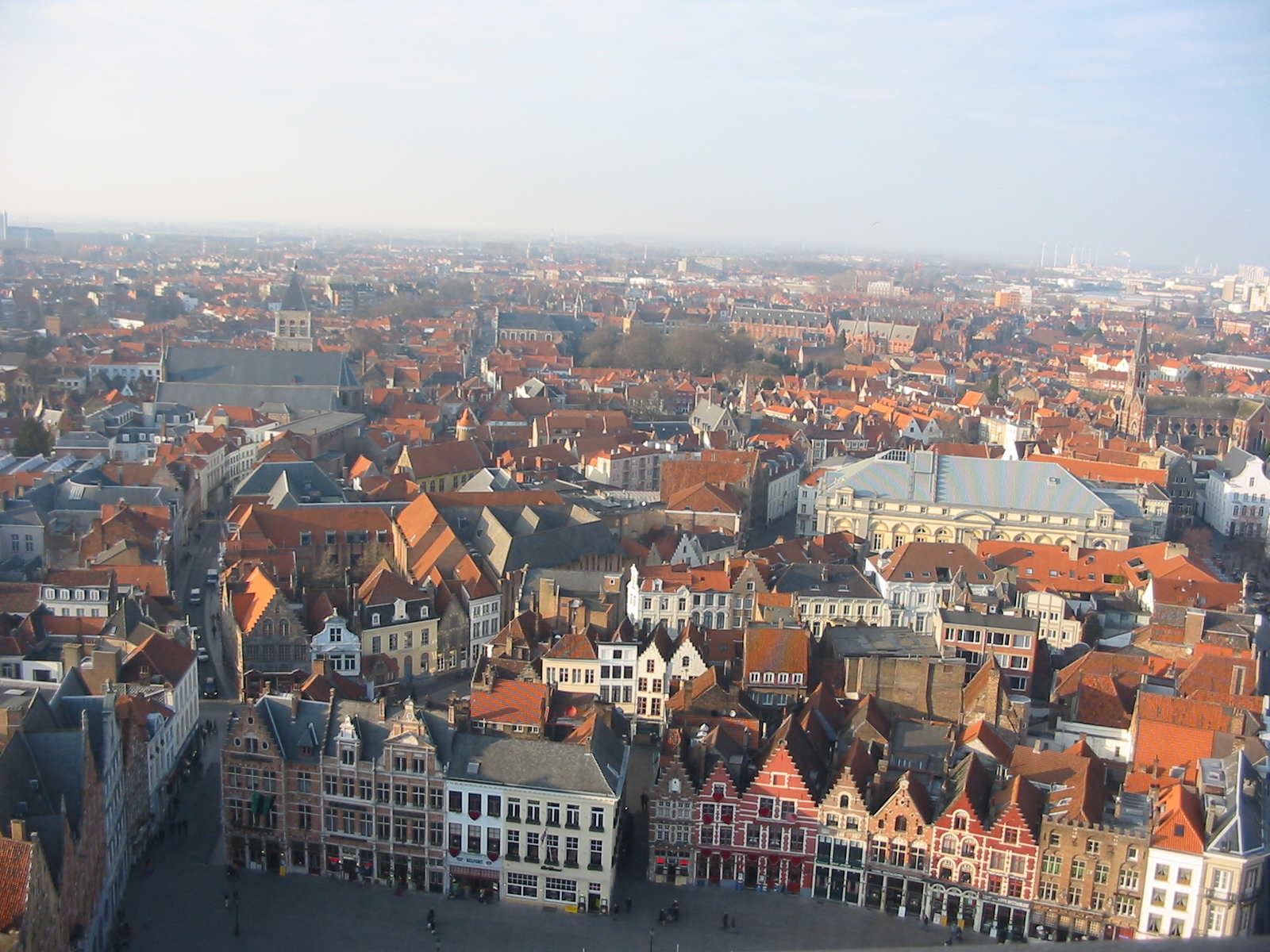
Bruges

In 1762, during a time of rising social tensions, France formally expelled the Jesuits from the country. This resulted in the college's decline and eventual end. The expulsion split the college. The Jesuit masters and many of the students fled to the Austrian Netherlands, now part of modern Belgium, moving first to Bruges, and then to Liège, where the college operated under the protection of the Prince-Bishop of Liège from 1773.

King Louis XV continued the college at St Omer, under the direction of secular clergy. When the Jesuit order was suppressed everywhere in 1773, the dual system ended, but the college never regained its prominence.

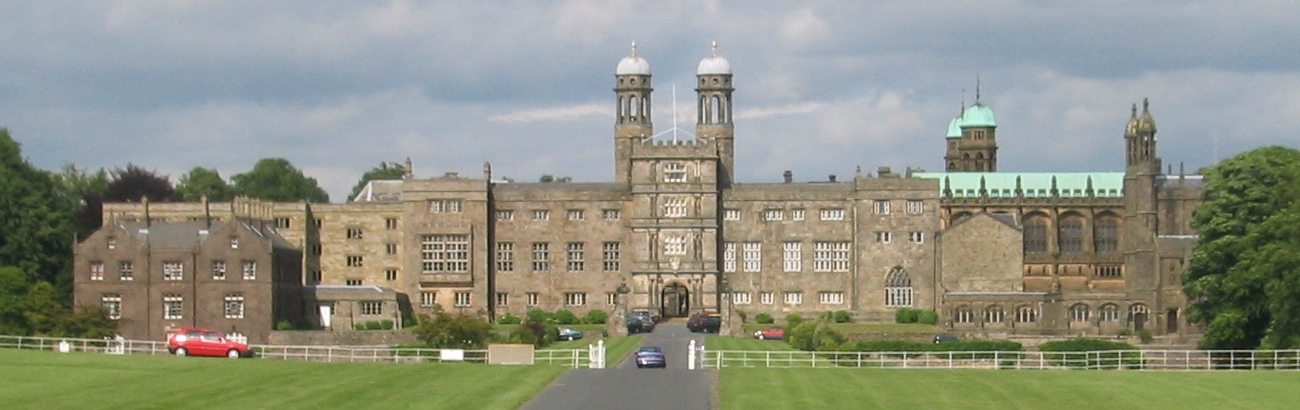
Stonyhurst College

In 1793, the French Revolution weakened the college at Saint Omer, and France's declaration of war on Great Britain finally ended it. The English masters and students were interned until February 1795. Meanwhile, the English penal laws and resulting discrimination had changed, and Roman Catholic education was now possible in England. Once released in France, some of the staff and most of the hundred remaining students went to England, to avoid the war on the European continent. A former member, Thomas Weld, donated a mansion and grounds at Stonyhurst, in Lancashire.

The modern Stonyhurst College continues to this day as a direct lineal descendant of the college of Saint-Omer. In France, the Lycée Alexandre Ribot was developed on the site of the former Jesuit college in Saint Omer.

Heythrop College, University of London, the now-defunct specialist Philosophy and Theology constituent College of the University of London, shared its (1614) foundation in Liège with Stonyhurst College.

== Notable alumni ==
William Ireland

Alumni include: three Saints, twelve Beati, and twenty-two martyrs.

- St Philip Evans SJ, executed at Cardiff in 1679.
- St Thomas Garnet SJ, protomartyr of St Omer, one of the Forty Martyrs of England and Wales, executed at Tyburn in 1608.
- St John Plessington, executed at Chester in 1679.
- Aedanus Burke, Chief Justice of South Carolina.
- Archbishop John Carroll, SJ, first Archbishop of Baltimore and founder of Georgetown University in Washington, D.C., the oldest Catholic university in the United States.
- Charles Carroll, Maryland delegate, signer of the Declaration of Independence
- Daniel Carroll, brother of John and cousin of Charles, was one of only five men to sign both the Articles of Confederation and the United States Constitution.
- Christopher G. Champlin, politician from Rhode Island
- Maurice Ewens, English Jesuit and author
- William Ireland, Jesuit
- William Matthews, first American-born Catholic priest
- Arthur Murphy, English barrister, journalist, actor, biographer, translator and playwright
- Charles Plowden, Jesuit, teacher and writer. He was chaplain at Lulworth Castle
- Gilbert Talbot SJ, known as Father Grey.·
- Edward Weld of Lulworth Castle, heir and landowner. First husband of Maria Fitzherbert
- John Weld (1743–1759), second son of Edward Weld (Senior)
- Thomas Weld (of Lulworth), fourth son of Edward Weld (1705–1761), bibliophile, philanthropist and great benefactor of English Jesuits

== Rectors and superiors ==
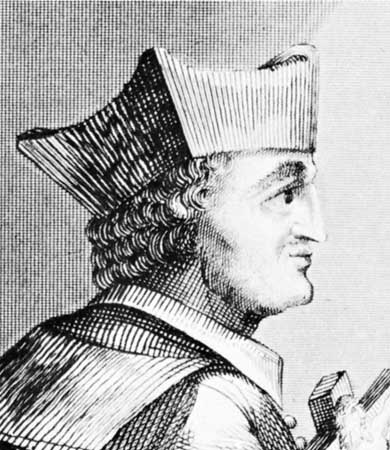
Edward Petre

Below is a list of college rectors from its foundation until the move to England. Marmaduke Stone, the last President of Liège, was also the first President of Stonyhurst College. In 1803 he helped to re-establish the Society of Jesus in Britain, beginning at Stonyhurst.

St Omer (1593–1762)

Superior
William Flack SJ (1593–1594)

Rectors
Jean Foucart SJ (1594–1601)
Gilles Schoondonck SJ (1601–1617)
Philippe Dentiers SJ (1617–1621)
William Baldwin SJ (1621–1632)
Thomas Worsley SJ (1632–1637)
Thomas Port SJ (1637–1646)
Edward Courtney SJ (1646–1649)
Henry More SJ (1649–1660)
Richard Barton SJ (1660–1669)
Thomas Cary SJ (1669–1672)
Richard Ashby SJ (1672–1679)
Thomas Stapleton SJ (1679–1683)
John Warner SJ (1683–1688)
Michael Constable SJ (1688–1693)
Edward Petre SJ (1693–1697)
William Walton SJ (1697–1701)
Henry Humberston SJ (1701–1705)
Edward Slaughter SJ (1705–1709)
Richard Plowden SJ (1709–1712)
Louis Sabran SJ (1712–1715)
Francis Powell SJ (1715–1720)

William Darell SJ (1720–1721)
John Turberville SJ (1721–1722)
James Gooden SJ (1722–1725)
Richard Plowden SJ (1725–1728)
Richard Hyde SJ (1728–1731)
Thomas Eccleston SJ (1731–1737)
Marmaduke Constable SJ (1737–1739)
Percy Plowden SJ (1739–1742)
Richard Hyde SJ (1742–1745)
Charles Wells SJ (1745–1748)
Nathaniel Elliott SJ (1748–1752)
John Darell SJ (1752–1759)
Francis Scarisbrick SJ (1759–1762)

Bruges (1762–1773)

Nathaniel Elliott SJ (1762–1766)
Thomas Lawson SJ (1766–1769)
Thomas Stanley SJ (1769–1772)
Thomas Angier SJ (1772–1773)

Liège (1773–1794)

Director
John Howard SJ (1773–1783)

Presidents
William Strickland SJ (1783–1790)
Marmaduke Stone SJ (1790–1794)

== See also ==
- Lycée Alexandre Ribot
- English College, Douai
- List of Jesuit sites
