= List of Roman Catholics handed over to the judiciary in the London area during the 1640s =

List of Roman Catholic priests and recusants handed over to the English authorities in the London area by James Wadsworth and his fellow pursuivants between 3 November 1640 and the summer of 1651 and as such, it is not a complete list of Roman Catholic clergymen who were executed or banished for their religion under King Charles I and then under the Commonwealth.

== History ==
In the 1640s and early 1659 four men, Captain James Wadsworth, Francis Newton, Thomas Mayo, and Robert de Luke formed a partnership that hunted down Roman Catholics in the London area and handed them over to the authorities for a monetary reward: "the like having not been done by any others since the reformation of religion in this nation".

This catalogue tells a fearful but instructive tale; inasmuch as it shows how wantonly men can sport with the lives of their fellow-men, if it suit the purpose of a great political party. The patriots, to enlist in their favour the religious prejudices of the people, represented the king as the patron of popery, because he sent the priests into banishment, instead of delivering them to the knife of the executioner. Hence, when they became lords of the ascendant, they were bound to make proof of their orthodoxy; and almost every execution mentioned [below] took place by their order in 1642, or 1643. After that time they began to listen to the voice of humanity, and adopted the very expedient which they had so clamorously condemned. They banished instead of hanging and quartering.

— John Lingard (1902).

== List ==
This is a list of those handed over to the authorities by James Wadsworth and his fellow-pursuivants between 3 November 1640 and the summer of 1651. Some were condemned, some executed, and some reprieved:

Name	Notes
William Waller, als. Slaughter, als. Walker	Executed at Tyburn
Cuthbert Clapton	Condemned, reprieved and pardoned.
Bartholomew Bow	Executed at Tyburn.
Thomas Reynolds	Executed at Tyburn.
Edward Morgan	Executed at Tyburn.
Thomas Sanderson, als. Hammond	Executed at Tyburn.
Henry Heath (1599–1643), alias Pall Magdelen	Executed at Tyburn.
Francis Quashet	Died in Newgate Prison after judgements.
Arthur Bell (1590 – 11 December 1643)	Executed at Tyburn.
Ralph Corbey	Executed at Tybun.
John Duchet	Executed at Tybun.
John Hamond, als. Jackson	Condemned, reprieved by the king and died in Newgate.
Walter Coleman	Condemned and died in Newgate.
Edmond Cannon	Condemned and died in Newgate.
John Wigmore als. Turner	Condemned, reprieved by Charles I, and in the summer of 1651 was in custody in Newgate.
Andrew Ffryer, alias Herne, als. Richmond	Condemned and died in Newgate.
Augustinian Abbot, als. Rivers	Condemned, reprieved by the king, and died in Newgate.
John Goodman	Condemned and died in Newgate
Peter Welford	Condemned and died in Newgate.
Thomas Bullaker (1604 – 12 October 1642)	Executed at Tybun.
Robert Robinson	Indicted and proved, and made an escape out of the King's Bench.
James Brown	Condemned and died in Newgate.
Henry Morse (1595 – 1 February 1645)	Executed at Tyburn.
Thomas Worseley, alias Harvey	Indicted and proved, and reprieved by the Spanish ambassador and others.
Charles Chanie (Cheney) als. Tomson	Indicted and proved, and begged by the Spanish ambassador, and since taken by command of the Council of State, and in the summer of 1651 was in Newgate.
Andrew White	Indicted, proved, reprieved before judgement and banished.
Richard Copley	Condemned and banished.
Richard Worthington	Found guilty and banished.
Edmond Cole, Peter Wright (1603 – 19 May 1651), and William Morgan	Indicted, proved, and sent beyond sea.
Philip Morgan	Executed at Tyburn.
Edmond Ensher, als. Arrow	Indicted, condemned, reprieved by Parliament and banished.
Thomas Budd, als. Peto, als. Gray	Condemned, reprieved by the lord mayor of London, and others, justices, retaken by order of the Counsel of State, and he was imprisoned in Newgate from 1650 until 1654.
George Baker, als. Macham	indicted, proved guilty, and in the summer of 1651 was in Newgate.
Peter Beale, als. Wright	Executed at Tyburn.
George Gage	Indicted by Wadsworth and his partners, found guilty, and died before the summer of 1651.
