= James Wadsworth =

James Wadsworth may refer to:

- James Wadsworth (Jesuit) (1572–1623), English Catholic priest and Jesuit
- James Wadsworth (Spanish scholar and pursuivant) (1604–1656?), son of the Jesuit
- James Wadsworth (lawyer) (1730–1816), American jurist and politician
- James Wadsworth (of Geneseo) (1768–1844), American pioneer and philanthropist
- James Wadsworth (mayor) (1819–1891), American politician, mayor of Buffalo, New York
- James S. Wadsworth (1807–1864), American soldier
- James W. Wadsworth (1846–1926), American politician - House
- James W. Wadsworth Jr. (1877–1952), American politician - Senate
- James Jeremiah Wadsworth (1905–1984), American diplomat
