= Arthur Bell (martyr) =

English Franciscan martyr

Blessed Arthur Bell OFM
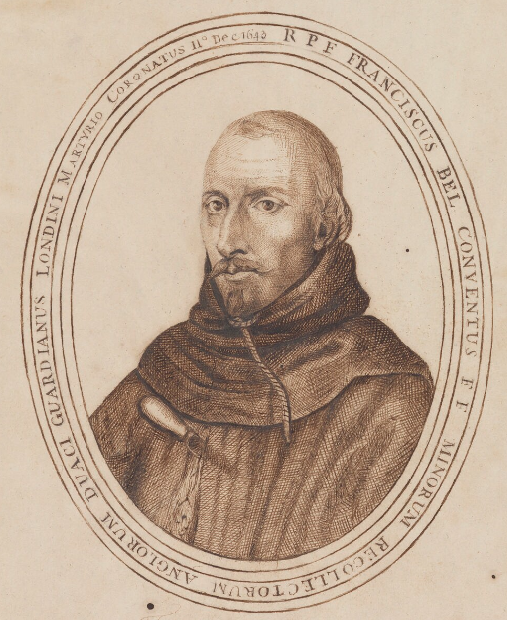

Martyr
- Born: 13 January 1590; Temple-Broughton near Worcester, England
- Died: 11 December 1643 (aged 53); Tyburn, London, England
- Venerated in: Roman Catholic Church
- Beatified: 22 November 1987 by Pope John Paul II
- Feast: 11 December, 22 November (with the martyrs of England and Wales)

Arthur "Francis" Bell, OFM (13 January 1590 – 11 December 1643) was an English Franciscan friar. He was found guilty of being a Catholic priest by a court sitting under the auspices of Parliament during the English Civil War. He was executed at Tyburn in London. Bell was beatified by Pope John Paul II on 22 November 1987.

== Biography ==
Bell was born at Temple-Broughton near Worcester on 13 January 1590, a son of the lawyer William Bell. When he was eight his father died and his mother gave him into the charge of her brother, Francis Daniel of Acton in Suffolk, a man of wealth, learning and piety. When Arthur was twenty-four he was sent to the English college at St.-Omer. He later went to the St. Alban's College in Valladolid to continue and complete his studies.

Bell received the habit of the Franciscan Order at Segovia, Spain on 8 August 1618, taking the religious name Francis. After the completion of his novitiate and the ordination to priesthood, he was called from Spain to labour in the restoration of the English province of the Franciscans. He was one of the first members of the Franciscan community at Douai, where he subsequently taught as a professor of Hebrew and fulfilled the office of the guardian (superior of a convent). He was well-versed in Latin, Hebrew, Greek, Spanish, French, Flemish and English. Among his students was Henry Heath.

While there, Bell published an octavo volume containing his father's will of 1587, a statement of his theological opinions, and his pedigree. He also served as chaplain to the Poor Clares at Gravelines. He was then transferred to Brussels. By then, he was already known to the English authorities.

In 1632 Bell was sent to Scotland as first provincial of the Franciscan province there; but his efforts to restore the order in Scotland were unsuccessful.

In 1634 he returned to England, where he laboured until November 1643, when he was apprehended by the parliamentary troops at Stevenage in Hertfordshire on suspicion of being a spy. A search of his papers provided evidence that he was a Roman Catholic priest, and on that basis he was committed to the Newgate prison.

He was condemned as a priest on the evidence of James Wadsworth, Thomas Mayhew or Mayo, and Thomas Gage. The circumstances of his trial show Bell's devotedness to the cause of the Catholic faith and his willingness to suffer for the faith. When condemned to be hanged, drawn and quartered it is said that he broke forth into a solemn Te Deum and thanked his judges profusely for the favour they were conferring upon him in allowing him to die for Christ.

== Works ==
Bell wrote The History, Life, and Miracles of Joane of the Cross (St.-Omer, 1625). He also translated from the Spanish of Andrew a Soto A brief Instruction how we ought to hear Mass (Brussels, 1624).

== See also ==
- Arthur of Glastonbury
- Thomas More
- Eighty-five martyrs of England and Wales
- Thomas Bullaker
- Walter Colman
