= Thomas Gage (priest) =

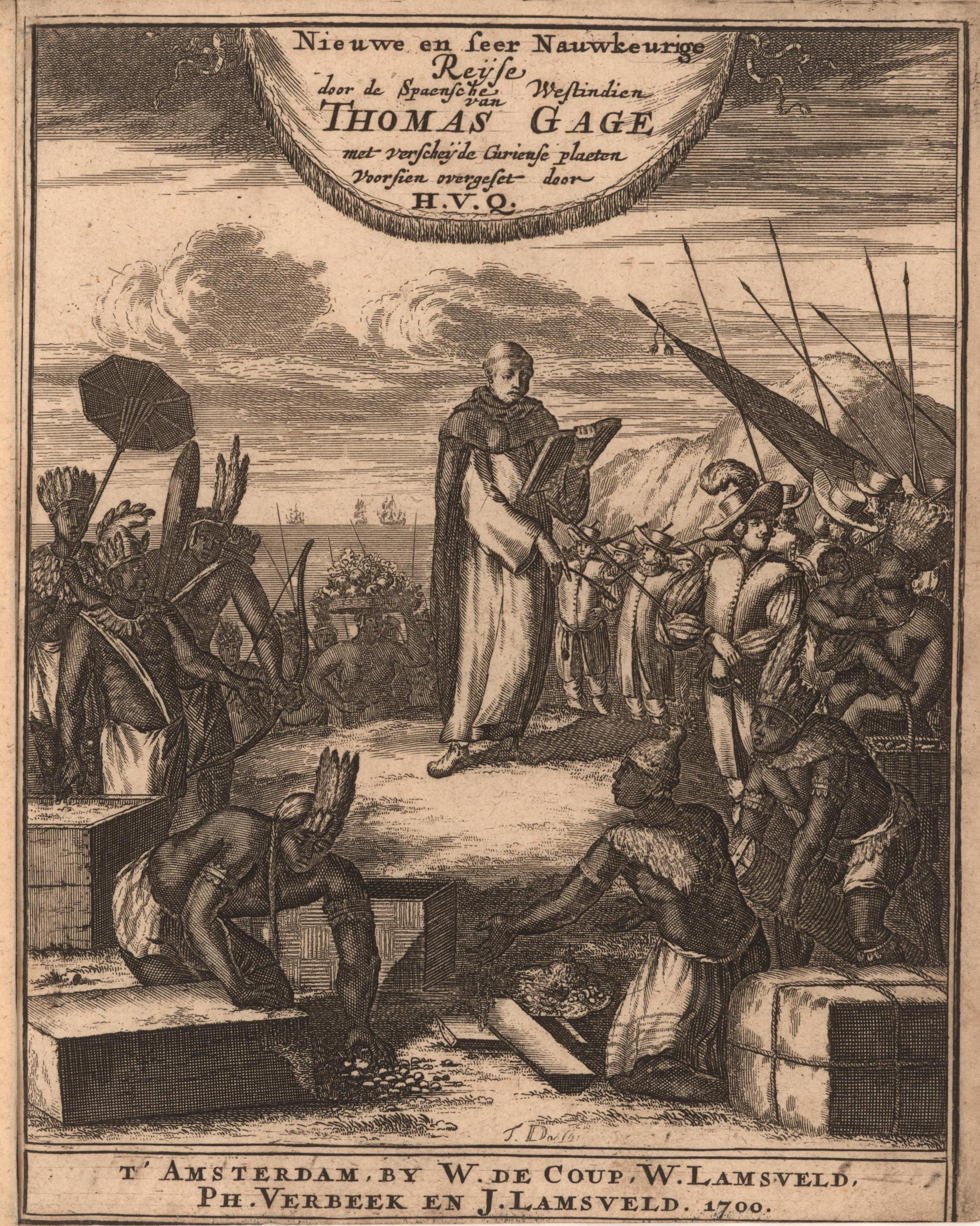
Engraved title page from the Dutch translation of Thomas Gage's The English-American his travail by sea and land: or, A new survey of the West-Indies (Amsterdam 1700)

Thomas Gage (c. 1603 – 1656) was an English Dominican friar, best known for his travel writing on New Spain and Central America during a sojourn there of over a decade. He closely observes colonial society and culture. On his return to England in 1637 he converted to Anglicanism.

== Early life ==
Thomas Gage was the son of son of John Gage of Haling, Surrey, by Margaret, daughter of Sir Thomas Copley of Gatton in that county. Both of his parents were condemned to death. The family were strong Catholics and intermarried with other Catholic families, including that of Sir Thomas More, the former Lord Chancellor.

Gage was born into a long-established recusant family in Surrey: both his parents had been condemned to death and then reprieved for harbouring Catholic priests, while an uncle had been executed for his role in the Babington Plot to assassinate Elizabeth I in 1586. Robert Southwell, the Jesuit martyr, was a cousin.

The family's Catholicism was practised behind closed doors. His three older brothers followed in the Catholic tradition. The eldest was the Royalist soldier Colonel Sir Henry Gage (1597–1645), who fought on the Continent for Catholic Spain and eventually in England for Charles I. According to J. Eric S. Thompson, Henry Gage "strove entirely to eradicate all remembrance of Thomas and his misdeeds from his mind." George Gage was a diplomat and priest, who also disavowed "my graceless brother"; and William was a Jesuit.

John Gage wanted his son Thomas to become a Jesuit, and to this end sent him for a schooling with the Jesuits of the College of St. Omer in the Low Countries and seems to have been an unremarkable pupil. From St Omer he was sent for further education with a view to becoming a Jesuit priest at the English College at Valladolid in Spain. Valladolid was the scene of a good deal of rivalry and bad feelings between the different religious orders, a situation worsened by the temperamental and political tensions between the Spanish and the English. Gage developed a contempt for the Jesuits and chose the Dominicans. He joined the Dominicans in Jerez, Spain, taking the religious name Tomás de Santa María, and his pro-Jesuit father disinherited him. He volunteered in 1625 for the mission to the Philippines. Before his departure a royal decree forbade any foreigner, under severe penalties, to go to the Spanish colonies. Fellow friars aided Gage to board the ship for the Indies, and he was hidden in a barrel and the party of thirty or so Dominican friars sailed from Cadiz, on 2 July 1625.

== In the Spanish Americas ==
The route led through Mexico, where Gage decided to remain and for a time taught Latin in the convent school. By Gage's own account, in Mexico City he heard from a friar who had run away from his duties in the Philippines that the Dominican superiors there were cruel and harsh and the friars corrupt and worldly. In order to escape onward posting to the Philippines, Gage and three other friars escaped from Mexico for Guatemala. Here he was accepted by the Dominicans as a useful addition to their manpower. He spent two or three years in the priory in Santiago de los Caballeros, where he seems to have liked the opportunity to study but began to have religious doubts and was led to ask to return to England. The Dominican authorities refused, on the grounds that missionaries had to remain in the Americas for ten years.

Further embittered, he decided to accompany friar Francisco Moran into new territories of Guatemala to learn the language and ways of the Amerinds. This he did and preached to two communities of Mixco and Pinola for five years. It seems likely that this was already in his mind at least in part a largely mercenary operation, aimed at gathering funds to finance a return to England. Gage gathered a handsome 9,000 crowns, in what proportion honestly gained is left unclear. By 1635, with this sum accumulated, Gage, now increasingly disenchanted with Spanish America, was ready to return to Europe, requested permission from the Dominican Provincial, was refused and was posted instead to Petapa. After a year there he decided to run for it. All in all, he had spent the years 1625–1637 in Mexico and Guatemala.

Turning his wealth into pearls and precious stones, on 7 January 1637, he made his way through Nicaragua and sailed from Costa Rica on 4 February. He was captured by Dutch corsairs led by Diego el Mulato en route. Gage was unharmed and was allowed to keep some books and paintings, but lost all his other valuables. He finally reached Spain on 28 November 1637, and in 1638 arrived in England. There, after an absence of twenty-six years, he discovered that he had been disowned and disinherited by his father, long deceased, though he was welcomed and treated well by his family. He could not get along with his fellow Dominicans in England and soon travelled to Rome, though his doubts about his faith continued. On the way out he called on his brother Colonel Henry Gage at his winter quarters near Ghent. This journey, lengthened by ill health and wartime conditions, brought him a number of adventures, but also the opportunity to visit Protestant communities in both Germany and France. In Rome, where he continued to conceal his leaning toward Protestantism, he involved himself in a variety of intrigues.

== Conversion to Anglicanism ==
Without doubt, he encountered cases of the sort of laxity which the Dominican and other orders were trying to remedy in other parts of the world. Clerical scandals are not new, either. At the same time, Gage dedicates his energies to telling the world tales such as that of the friars playing cards, with one friar who jokingly scoops the winnings into the sleeve of his habit, saying that Dominicans are forbidden to touch money. An incident like that may have been marked by bad taste, and it may have been symptomatic of a less-than-devout atmosphere, but it might also not merit a change of religion. Another story recounted with disdain by a Gage who against his vows amassed a fortune, is of the Spanish friar noted for his learning who was excommunicated when money was found in his quarters. Gage seems to be by temperament a bitter pill and later in life seems distinctly unhinged.

Despairing now perhaps more or less of everything, he returned from Rome to England in September 1640, and began to take an active part in the parliamentary troubles in England, and then in 1642 publicly abandoned the Catholic Church for a Puritanical form of Anglicanism. He became a "Preacher of the Word", and as a means to improve the lukewarm reception he had received among Protestants and by the Parliamentarian part, he married. Though for this he was rewarded with the rectorship of Acrise in Kent, he had won for himself general ridicule by a sermon he preached that summer in St Paul's, London, and published in October under the title "The Tyranny of Satan, discovered by the teares of a converted sinner [...] by Thomas Gage, formerly a Romish Priest, for the space of 38 yeares, and now truly reconciled to the Church of England". In December 1642 he testified against the priest Thomas Holland, whom he had known at St. Omer and Valladolid, and obtained a sentence of hanging, drawing and quartering which was effectively carried out. The following year, 1643 it was the turn of the Franciscan Francis Bell, with the same result. On 7 September 1644, the Jesuit Ralph Corby was executed on his evidence.

Gage then set about publicizing his life's experience, and published his now-famous book, The English-American his Travails by Sea and Land in 1648, which was as much a political pamphlet and an adventurer's prospectus as a traveller's tale.

That of Thomas Holland was not the only death for which Gage was responsible among the Catholics. In 1650 two priests were arrested, the Jesuit Peter Wright and the Dominican Thomas Middleton or Dade. Wright had been a chaplain in Ghent and in England to Thomas Gage's soldier brother Henry and had attended Henry at his death. Dade was the provincial of the English Dominicans. Gage was the chief prosecution witness. His brother George visited him and pleaded with him not to stain himself with judicial murder. Thomas Gage promised to desist and did get Dade, against whom he had a personal grudge, off the charge. Possibly Gage was afraid for his own safety if he let the trial collapse. The execution of Wright was not popular and Gage's treachery, compounded by his attack on his late brother Henry's good name, earned even the rebuke of the court.

In 1651 came an attempt to win back some public regard with his A duell betvveen a Iesuite and a Dominican : begun at Paris, gallantly fought at Madrid, and victoriously ended at London, upon fryday the 16-day of May, Anno Dom. 1651 / by Thomas Gage, alias the English American, now preacher of the word at Deal in Kent, in several printings, and then his A full survey of Sion and Babylon, and a clear vindication of the parish-churches and parochial-ministers of England [...], or, A Scripture disproof, and syllogistical conviction of M. Charles Nichols, of Kent : delivered in three Sabbath-dayes sermons in the parish church of Deal in Kent, after a publick dispute in the same church with the said Mr. Charles Nichols, upon the 20. day of October 1653.

== Informer ==
Not only was Gage not a silent convert, but he was also prepared to go to great lengths to persecute his former faith. He obtained the death sentence for Thomas Holland (1642), Francis Bell (1643), Ralph Corby (1644) and Peter Wright (1651). In 1649 he is said to have been summoned by the Council of State, presumably to provide information about Catholic priests. In fact, there is a record of a Thomas Gage being arrested in 1617, and brought before the Privy Council. It cannot be excluded that this was our Thomas Gage and that the Council released him in return for his becoming a spy, though this is not proved.

== The travel writer ==
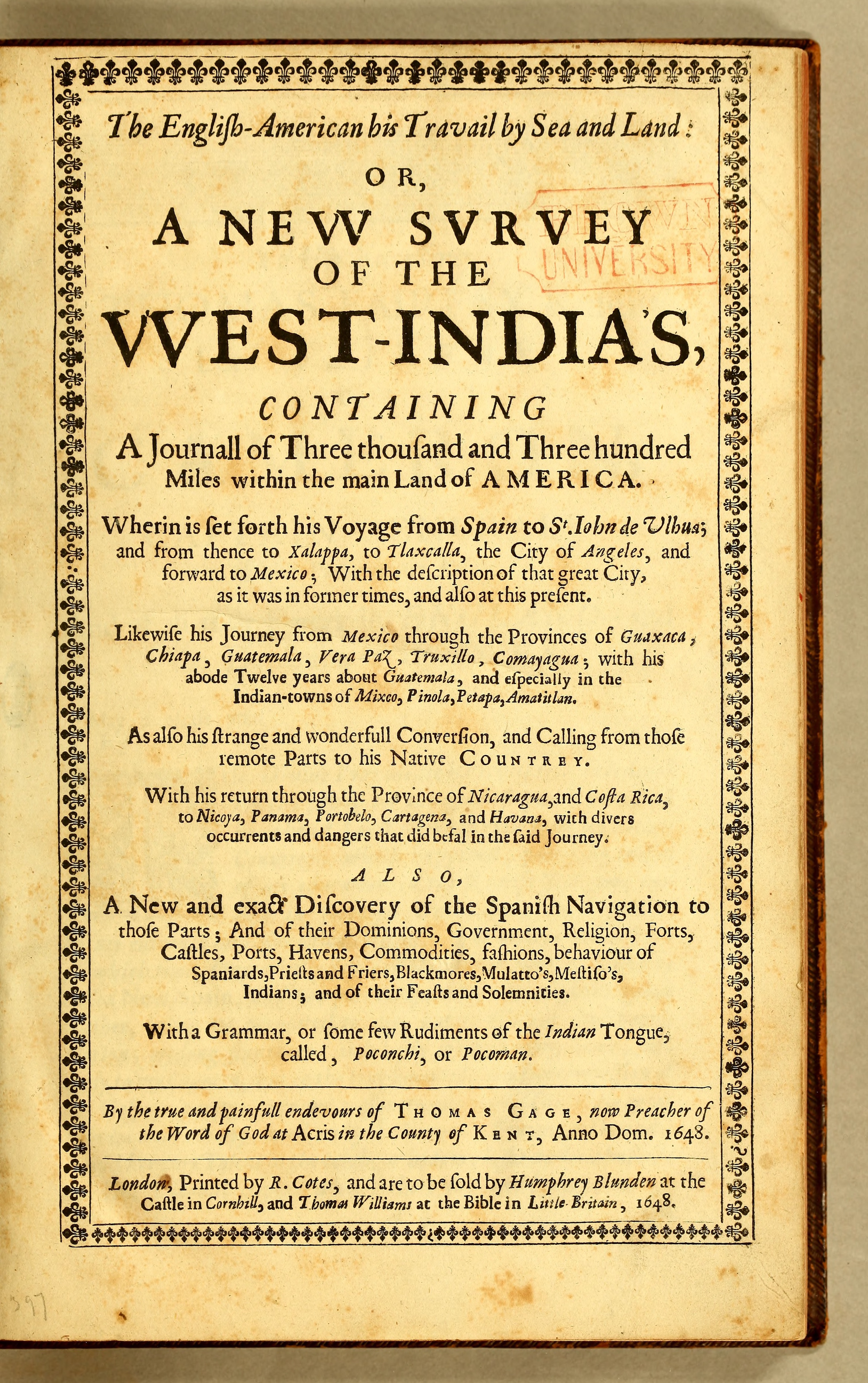
Title page, The English-American his travail by sea and land: or, A new survey of the West-Indies, London 1648

When the Civil War brought success for the Revolution, he had aligned himself become closely with Oliver Cromwell. In 1648 he published The English-American, or a New Survey of the West Indies, a mixture of some original with plagiarized material, taken in later editions especially from the compilation by the parson Samuel Purchas and from the Hispania Victrix (1552) by Francisco Lopez de Gómara (1511–1562). Though full of exaggerations and some flagrant romancing, the book made a sensation and for the first time made public a description of the Spanish possessions in America. It was to be reprinted in expanded editions, in extracts and in translations thereafter. In this book, addressed to Sir Thomas Fairfax, Lord Fairfax of Cameron, the Parliamentary Captain-General, Gage promotes the view that the Spanish dominions with their long coastlines and weak defences would be an easy prey for English forces and urges such an attack as a sort of religious duty and mission upon the English. If God raised the Puritans to purify England, how much more needing remedy were the Catholic-dominated regions of the Americas, subjugated by what Gage considers their notoriously corrupt clergy? The thesis was that it would be possible to attack and loot Spanish possessions in the Americas, without embarking upon a costly war in Europe. The book made special mention of whatever might assist an invading army—roads, fortifications, populations, and layouts of towns. It is hard to set aside the suspicion that the details in the book were the fruit of the observations of a professional spy.

== The military adventurer ==
On the strength of Gage's undoubted experience in the Caribbean and Central America, this appeal was heeded, especially with the ending of the Anglo-Dutch war in 1654 led Cromwell to be attentive to new foreign policy openings. In a secretly planned operation, a force of 18 warships, 20 transport vessels and 3,000 men set sail from Portsmouth on Christmas Day 1654 with Gage on board as chaplain and guide and arrived at Barbados a month later. In practice, the soldiers were in part the most troublesome members of their regiments, in part newly pressed Londoners. An additional 6,000 troops, untrained and badly disciplined, were raised from servants and freemen in the colonies of Barbados, Montserrat, Nevis and St Kitts.

Supplies ran low, the joint commanders squabbled and morale plunged when the soldiers learned they were not to plunder the Spanish colonies. The aim was to secure a base of operations in the Caribbean and from there to threaten Spanish trade and treasure routes in Central America and weaken Catholic influence in the Americas. Arriving off Santo Domingo on 13 April 1655, the expedition found that it had been reported beforehand and the Spaniards were ready. On shore, the English forces suffered greatly from heat and drought during their march through difficult tropical terrain. Moreover, contrary to Gage's confident prediction, the Indians fighting with the Spanish had taken measures of defence. Coupled with the democratic habits of the Roundheads, the result was a fiasco.

Moving on, the fleet anchored on 11 May off Jamaica, landed the troops of General Venables, and, after a desperate resistance by the Spaniards, captured the island. Though Spain formally ceded Jamaica to England in 1670, the maroons (enslaved Africans freed by their Spanish masters) harassed the English efficiently into the 18th century. The expeditions commanders were later to be charged with deserting their posts, briefly imprisoned in the Tower, and relieved of their commands. As to Thomas Gage, before the immediate operation was concluded he died (probably of dysentery) in 1656.
