= Alethea Howard, Countess of Arundel =

English noble and art patron

Alethea Howard
- Countess of Arundel
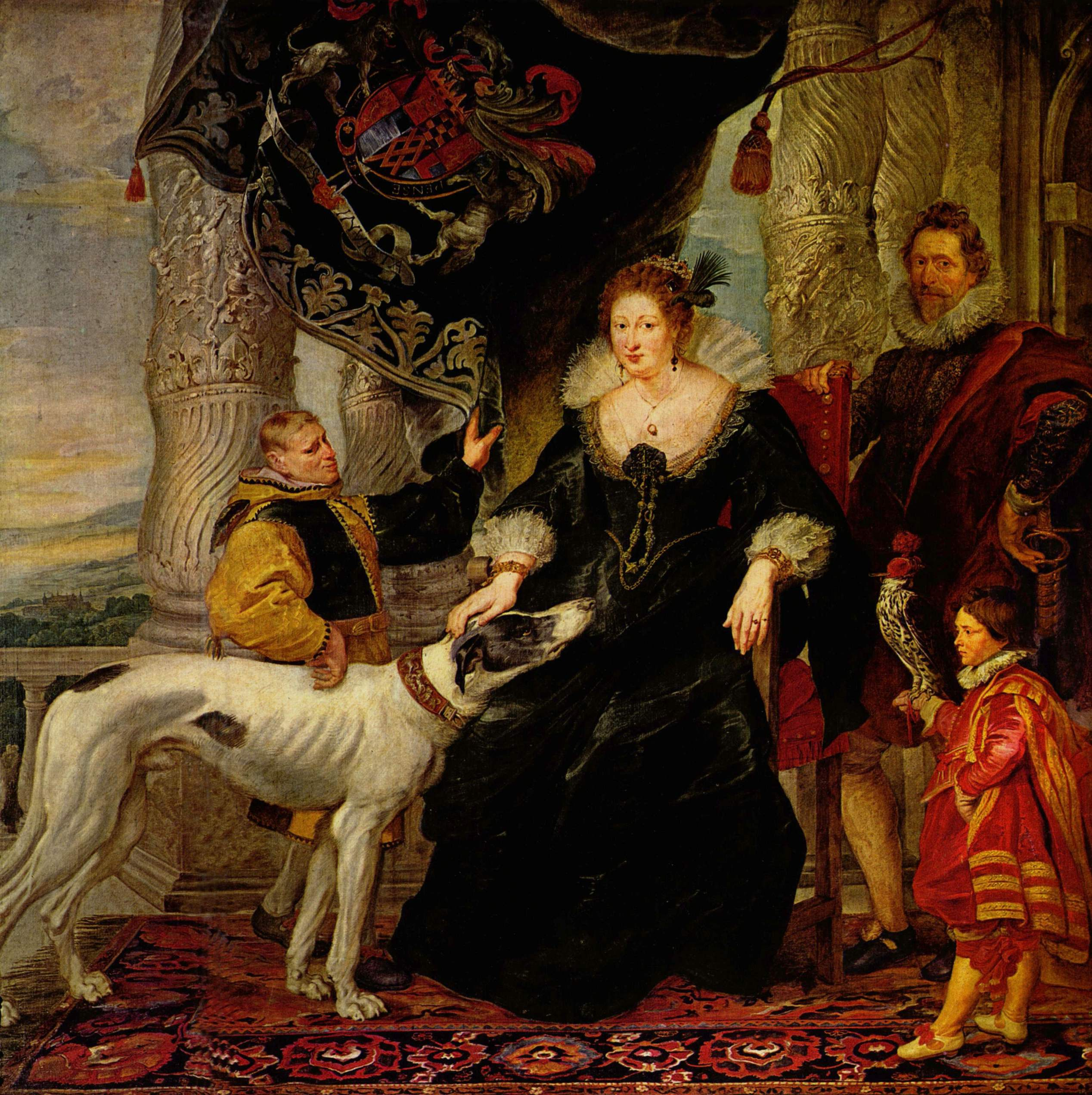
- Peter Paul Rubens, Alethea Talbot with attendants and Sir Dudley Carleton, c. 1620. Alte Pinakothek.
- Born: 1585; Sheffield, Yorkshire, England
- Died: 3 June 1654 (aged 68–69); Amsterdam, Netherlands
- Noble family: Talbot
- Spouse: Thomas Howard
- Issue: James Howard, Baron Maltravers; Henry Howard, 15th Earl of Arundel; William Howard, 1st Viscount Stafford; Mary Anne Howard
- Father: Gilbert Talbot, 7th Earl of Shrewsbury
- Mother: Mary Cavendish

Alethea Howard, 14th Baroness Talbot, 17th Baroness Strange of Blackmere, 13th Baroness Furnivall, Countess of Arundel (1585 – 3 June [O.S. 24 May] 1654), née Lady Alethea Talbot (pronounced "Al-EE-thia"), was a famous patron and art collector, and one of England's first published female scientists. She was the wife of Thomas Howard, 21st Earl of Arundel with whom she built one of the most important art collections in 17th-century England. She was the youngest daughter of Gilbert Talbot, 7th Earl of Shrewsbury and his wife Mary Cavendish; and the sister of two other countesses: Mary Herbert, Countess of Pembroke and Elizabeth Grey, Countess of Kent. She was the granddaughter of Bess of Hardwick.

Alethea's considerable wealth came from her father Gilbert, 7th Earl of Shrewsbury. It was used to build her and her husband's art collection. Initially she obtained one third of the wealth, the other two thirds going to her sisters. She obtained the whole legacy once her two sisters died childless. This money still forms the basis of the wealth of the Duke of Norfolk.

== Marriage and issue ==
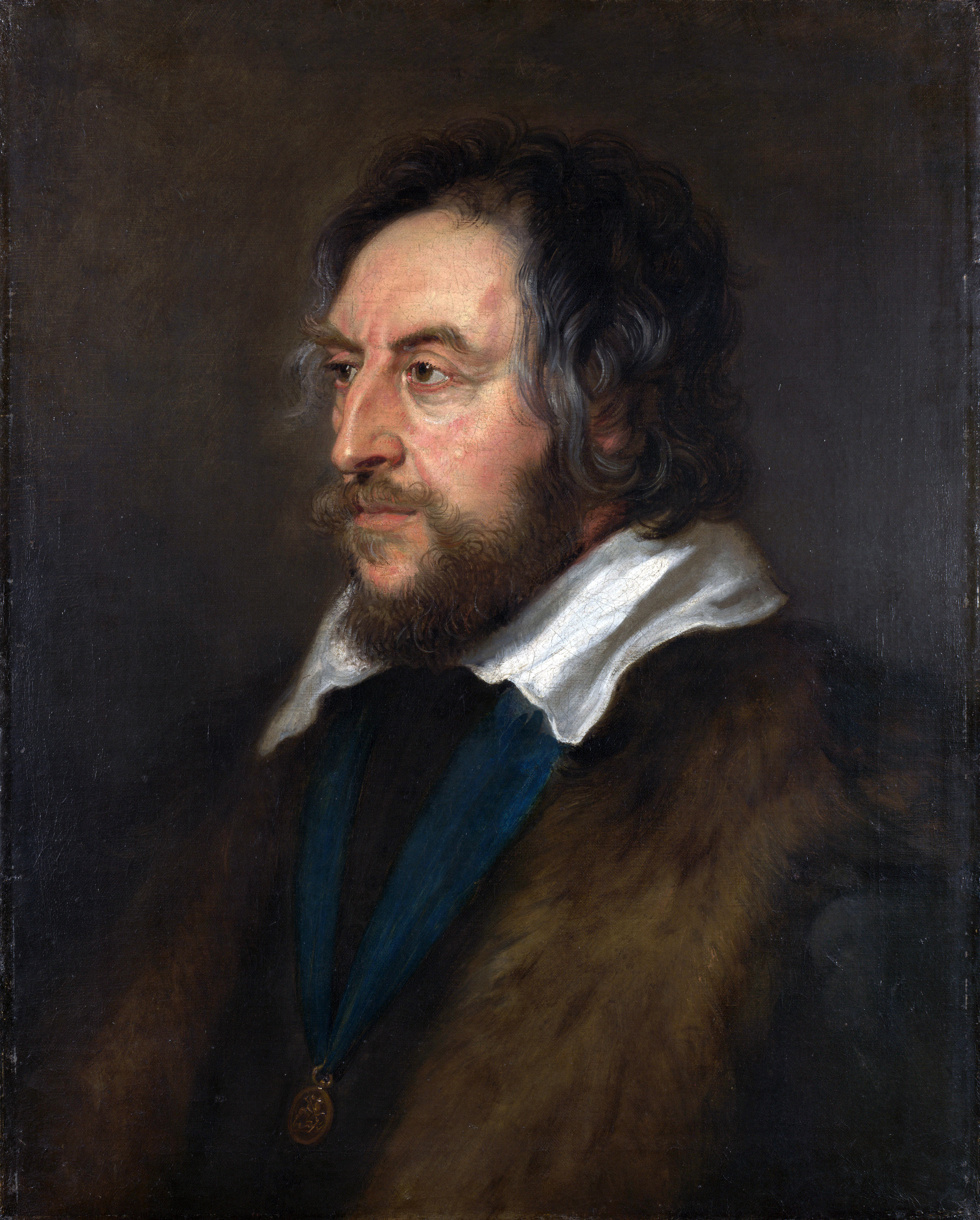
Thomas Howard, a portrait by Pieter Paul Rubens.

Lady Alethea Talbot was born in Sheffield, Yorkshire in 1585. In September 1606, she married the courtier Thomas Howard. They had 6 children, all sons, listed in his collected correspondence. Thomas also stated in his will that he had had six sons with his wife. Their fifth son William, Lord Stafford wrote a biography of his father which he dedicated to his mother listing their sons in this order:

- James Howard, Lord Maltravers (1607–1624), whose godparents were James VI and I and Anne of Denmark. James died aged 15.
- Henry Howard, 15th Earl of Arundel (1608–1652) named as the second son
- Gilbert - died young
- Thomas - died young
- William Howard, 1st Viscount Stafford (1614–1680) named as the fifth son
- Charles - died young

A daughter Mary Anne Howard (1614–1658) is a genealogical fiction created to give the emigrant Jeffrey Ferris of Greenwich, Connecticut a noble wife.

== Life at court ==
Along with her sister Elizabeth and cousin Arbella Stuart, she performed in The Masque of Queens, written to Royal order by Ben Jonson, with costumes by Inigo Jones. The masque was originally planned to celebrate Christmas 1608 and was eventually performed at court on 2 February 1608/1609. On 5 June 1610, she danced as the "Nymph of Arun" in the masque Tethys' Festival. In 1612, the English diplomat in the Netherlands, William Trumbull sent trees for her house in Highgate, shipped from Vlissingen.

== Overseas travel ==
Lady Arundel wished to join her husband abroad but was dissuaded from doing so. Alethea and her husband accompanied the Elector Palatine Frederick V and his bride Princess Elizabeth Stuart to Heidelberg on their marriage in 1613.

Lady Arundel used her own money to buy back Arundel House and financed their trip to Italy in 1613–1614, travelling with Inigo Jones. The Earl of Arundel was one of the first Englishmen to buy antique statues. She met him in Siena. Then they travelled to Rome, Naples, Padua, Genoa, Turin, and Paris. They reached England in November 1614. Alethea's father died in 1616; she inherited a third of the estate and her husband's serious collecting started.

On 30 August 1618 Anne of Denmark provided a grand reception for the Venetian ambassador Piero Contarini at Oatlands Palace. Arundel sat next to the ambassador and talked of her time in Venice. At the end of the dinner there were sweetmeats, then they stood and toasted Elizabeth, Electress Palatine and Frederick V.

Around 1619 Lord Arundel sent his two elder sons to Padua. In 1620 Rubens painted Alethea Talbot, and her retinue, jester, dwarf and dog in Antwerp when she was on her way to Italy. (The male figure, called lord Arundel, was added many years later by an unknown hand.) He wished to visit his sons but decided that Lady Arundel should go alone. Lady Arundel was accompanied by Francesco Vercellini. She stayed in Spa and engaged apartments. Lady Arundel moved to Milan and Padua.

In 1622 she lived in Venice in the Palazzo Mocenigo facing the Canal Grande, and also in a villa at Dolo. Antonio Priuli's election to office as Doge of Venice began a brutal process of ferreting out individuals suspected of plotting against Venice. Hundreds were arrested, with or without cause, with attention specially focused on foreign soldiers and sailors. The manhunt led to the arrest of many actual plotters, but also of many innocent victims, such as Antonio Foscarini, a patrician and Venetian Ambassador to England (1611–15), who was executed on 21 April 1621, after attending an event at the English Embassy.

The hysteria ended in 1622, and on 16 January 1623, the Venetian government issued an apology for Foscarini's execution, thus marking a scaling back of the manhunt. Sir Henry Wotton warned her to leave Venice. She declined the advice and went straight to Venice. Insisting on appearing the next day, with Wotton, before Doge Priuli and the Senate she was completely justified. Lady Arundel left Venice with letters from Priuli ordering every favour to be shown to her on her journey through Venetian territory. She spent the winter in Turin together with her two sons. She met with Anthony van Dyck, the painter. Together they went to Mantua.

In 1623 she attempted to go to Spain to woo the Infanta, sister of Philip IV of Spain. She started for England, intending to visit the Queen of Bohemia at the Hague on the way. In 1624 her eldest son Maltravers died of smallpox in Ghent. In 1626 her husband was put in the Tower of London by Charles because their elder son Maltravers had secretly married Elisabeth Stuart (daughter of Esme Stuart, 1st Duke of Lennox), a kinswoman of Charles, without permission. Joachim von Sandrart gave his opinion on the collection and copied the works by Holbein. The King Charles I and Queen Henrietta Maria visited Arundel House to see the collections. Birth of another grandson to Lord Arundel.

The king refused to allow Lady Arundel to accompany her husband on a special embassy to Holland, to invite the Winter Queen, his sister, to England.

== Return to England ==
In 1633 Lady Arundel purchased a small villa, known as Tart Hall, located just south of Buckingham House (now Buckingham Palace). Her second son, Lord Maltravers, was elected member of the Dublin Parliament of 1634. Arundel and his son paid a visit to Lord Thomas Wentworth, 1st Earl of Strafford in Dublin.

In 1636 Lady Arundel met her husband on the Thames, after his visit to the Holy Roman Emperor. She is involved in a Catholic intrigue. Lord Arundel acquired the cabinet of the Dutch merchant Daniel Nijs. Maria de' Medici comes to England.

In 1638 Lady Arundel was indicted for recusancy and debts threatened to ruin the estate, and her husband started the Madagascar plan. Arundel House contained thirty-seven statues, 128 busts and 250 inscriptions. Artemisia Gentileschi may have worked for Aletheia. Van Dyck painted a portrait of Lord Arundel and his wife. With the departure of the Queen-Mother, Maria de' Medici from England, Lord and Lady Arundel were appointed to escort her to Cologne.

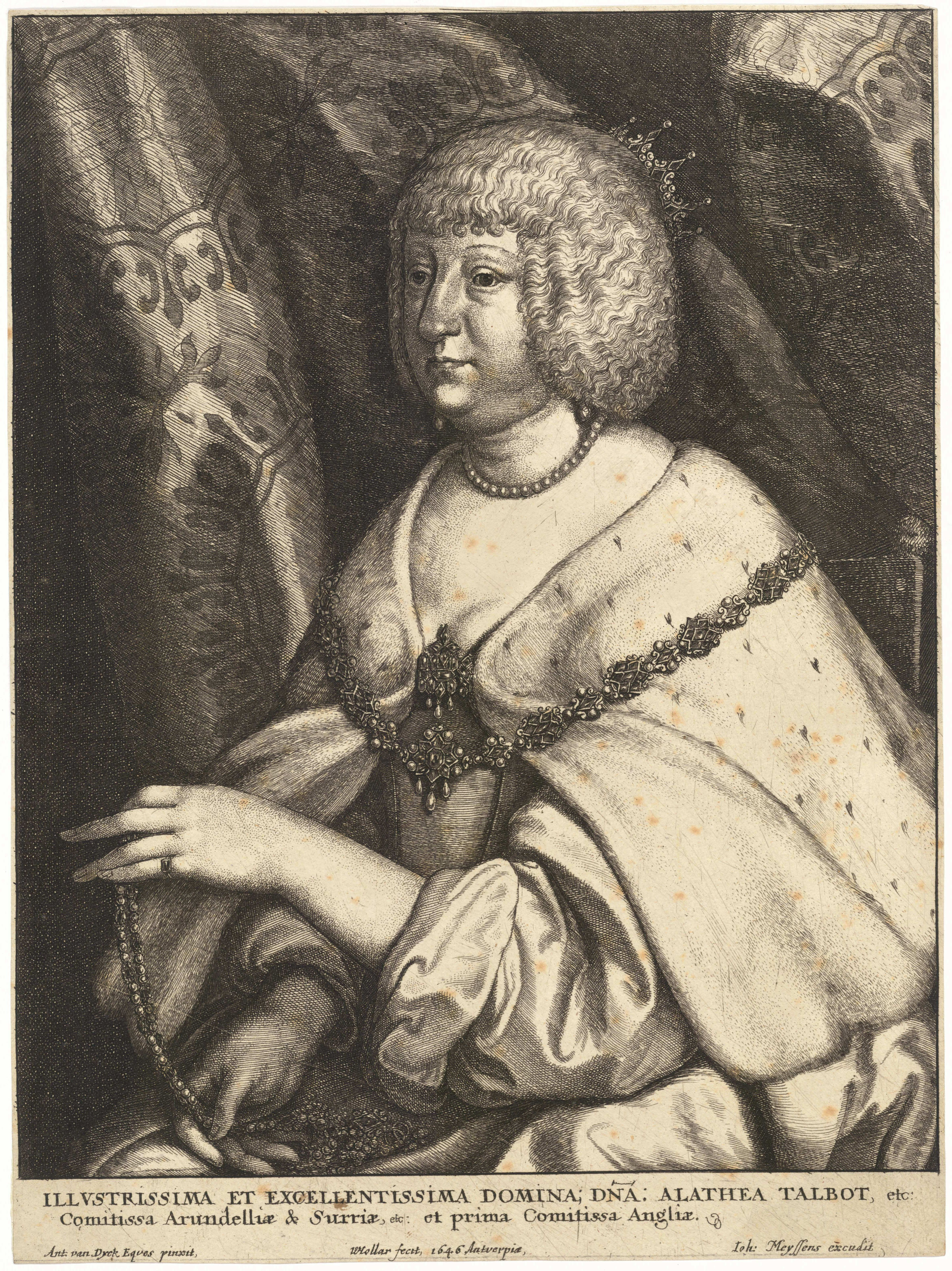
Wenceslas Hollar – Alethea, Countess of Arundel

== Exile in the Netherlands ==
In 1641, on the eve of the English Civil War, she and her husband, their son, Viscount Stafford, and his wife fled to the Netherlands. She commissioned an inventory of the contents of Tart Hall, her home on the margins of St James's, which included a chamber known as the Dutch Pranketing Room. Lady Arundel was not prepared to wait for Marie de' Medici and with characteristic decisiveness set off for the Continent on her own, the reason being, so it was said, that she had a 'mania' for travel.

Alethea went straight to Utrecht and met there with her husband. When he accompanied Maria de' Medici to Cologne, Alethea tried to persuade Urban VIII to allow her to enter a Carthusian monastery. In 1642, her husband accompanied the Queen and Princess Mary for her marriage to William II of Orange and left straight for Padua.

She lived in Antwerp, but moved to Alkmaar after her husband died. She invited Franciscus Junius, for thirty years in their service, to rearrange the collection of books. Then she moved to Amersfoort (1649), and rented a pied-a-terre in Amsterdam at Singel 292, an elegant house, with a courtyard facing Herengracht.

When the Earl of Arundel died, Alethea inherited the collection of 600 paintings and drawings including works by Dürer, Holbein, Brueghel, Lucas van Leyden, Rembrandt, Rubens, Van Dyck, Raffaello da Urbino and Titian. There were 181 works with no attribution; 200 statues and 5,000 drawings, which he had bought with her money. His debts (or the collection) were estimated £100.000.

She inherited Arundel Castle and Arundel House. Her eldest son argued for three years in court against his father's will. In 1651, she succeeded to the title of Baroness Furnivall, a title of her father's that had been in abeyance since his death. In 1652, her favourite son, William, was arrested in the Kurpfalz.

In 1652, her son, Henry, died. In 1653, William arrived in Amsterdam. On 3 June 1654, Alethea died in Amsterdam without leaving a will and a compiled and far from clear inventory was made. The inventory consisted of 36 paintings by Titian, 16 by Giorgione, 19 by Tintoretto, 11 by Correggio, 17 by Veronese 12 by Rafaello and five by Da Vinci.

== Legacy ==
Two grandchildren claimed half of the inheritance and sent Sir Edward Walker to the Netherlands. In 1655 Stafford was arrested in Utrecht, but released within a few weeks. Henry Howard, 6th Duke of Norfolk and his brother Charles were keen on getting the paintings and went in Utrecht to court in 1658 and 1661. Later on Henry inherited Arundel House, and Tart Hall (on Stafford Row) went to their uncle William.

== Writing and architecture ==
Like her sister, Elizabeth, Alethea was interested in the use of herbs and other foodstuffs for medical purposes. Her recipes were published under the title Natura Exenterata. Alethea's father Gilbert Talbot, 7th Earl of Shrewsbury, was a noted patron of early science, and Alethea herself was the author of one of the earliest printed books of technical and scientific material in England to be attributed to a woman – making her one of England’s first published female scientists.

She would have been devisor with her husband of their buildings, and was involved in site management at their Highgate house, Arundel House on the Strand, their lodge in Greenwich Park, and especially later in the 1630s during the development of her own Tart Hall in St James's Park. Tart Hall was built with the advice of the Catholic priest George Gage and the master mason Nicholas Stone.

Tart Hall, long demolished, is believed to have had some resemblance to the villas of the Veneto that the countess had seen. An inventory details the furnishings, including her bed chamber which was decorated with fabrics from India, a parlour with Indian furniture, and a room for the display of porcelain and other collections, called in Dutch fashion, a "Pranketing Room".

== Ancestry ==
Ancestors of Alethea Howard, Countess of Arundel

8. Francis Talbot, 5th Earl of Shrewsbury
4. George Talbot, 6th Earl of Shrewsbury
9. Mary Dacre
2. Gilbert Talbot, 7th Earl of Shrewsbury
10. Thomas Manners, 1st Earl of Rutland
5. Gertrude Manners
11. Eleanor Paston
1. Alethea Talbot
12. Thomas Cavendish
6. William Cavendish
13. Alice Smith
3. Mary Cavendish
14. John Hardwick
7. Bess of Hardwick
15. Elizabeth Leake

== Sources ==
- Edward Chaney, The Evolution of the Grand Tour: Anglo-Italian Cultural Relations since the Renaissance (Routledge, 2000).
- Lionel Cust, 'Notes on the collections formed by Thomas Howard, Earl of Arundel, and Surry', in The Burlington Magazine 1911/12, XX, pp. 97–100, 233–236 and 341–343.
- Dianne Duggan, 'Tart Hall: the Countess of Arundel's 'Casino' at Whitehall', in The Renaissance Villa in Britain 1500–1700, eds Malcolm Airs and Geoffrey Tyack (Spire Books 2007)
- M. F. S. Hervey, The life, correspondence and collections of Thomas Howard, Earl of Arundel, Cambridge 1921, Appendix V, The Arundel inventory, pp. 473–500.
- David Howarth, Lord Arundel and his circle (New Haven/London 1985)
- Jennifer Rabe, 'Mediating between Art and Nature: The Countess of Arundel at Tart Hall', in Sites of Mediation: Connected Histories of Places, Processes, and Objects in Europe and Beyond, 1450–1650, eds. Susanna Burghartz e.a. (Brill 2016)

Peerage of England
| In abeyance Title last held by Gilbert Talbot | Baroness Talbot; Baroness Furnivall; Baroness Strange of Blackmere; 1651–1654 | Succeeded by Thomas Howard |
