= Tart Hall =

Former house in Westminster, London

Coordinates: 51.50°N 0.14°W

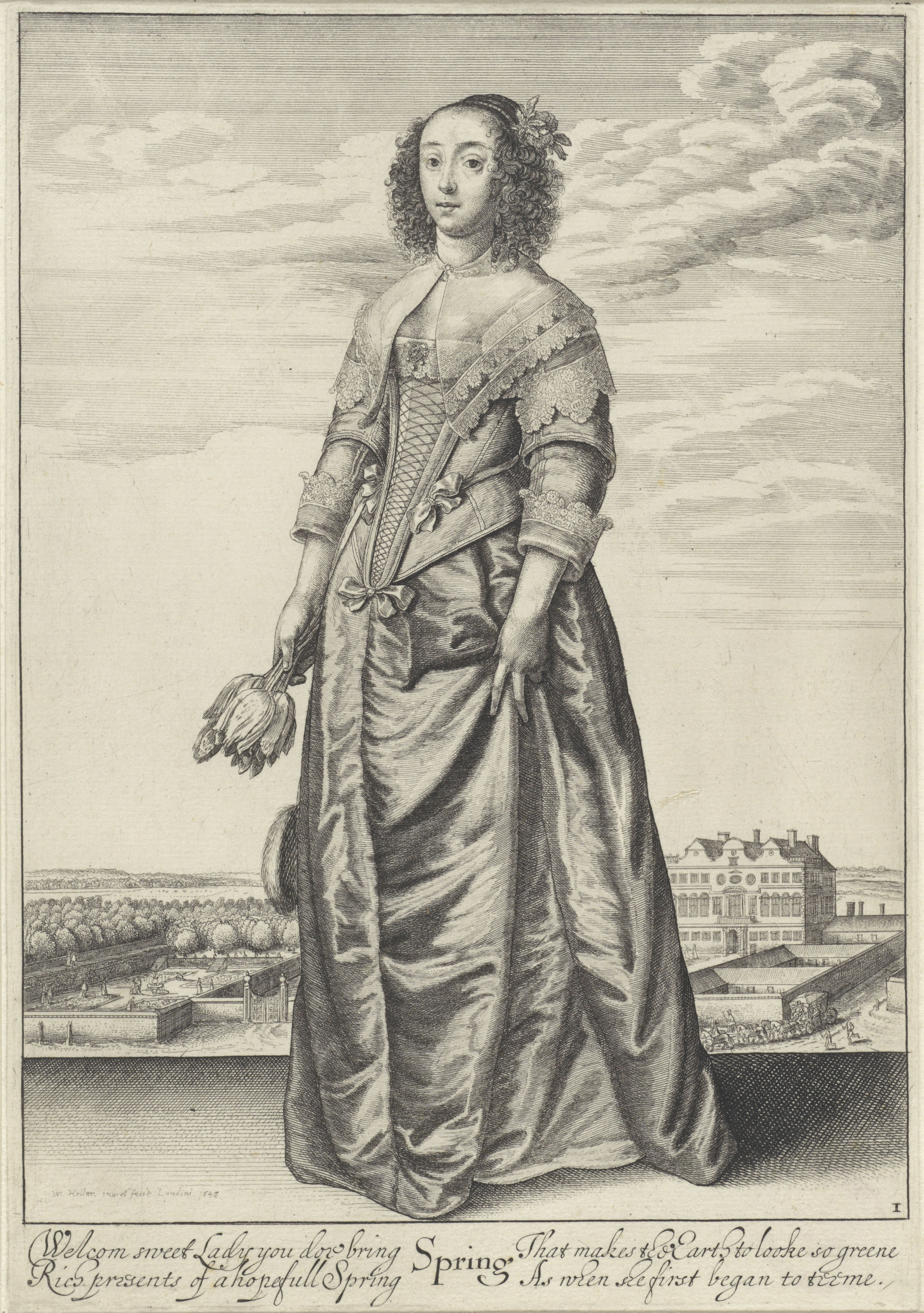
Print of "Spring" by Wenceslaus Hollar, 1643, with Tart Hall in the background

Tart Hall or Tart House was a small villa in the City of Westminster, London in the 17th century into the early 18th century. The building stood on the west side of James Street, now Buckingham Gate, immediately to the south of Buckingham House, now Buckingham Palace, at the west end of St James's Park. The origin of its name is not clear.

The site was bought by Alethea Howard, Countess of Arundel in 1633, although it is likely it was being leased before then. She had the house built, replacing or enlarging an existing building. The hall was sold in 1742 and demolished.

== Countess of Arundel ==
Lady Althea Talbot was born in 1585, the youngest of the three surviving daughters of Gilbert Talbot, 7th Earl of Shrewsbury. She married Thomas Howard, 14th Earl of Arundel in 1605, and had several other residences at her disposal in or around London, including Arundel House on the Strand near Somerset House, as well as a country estate at Albury and the family seat at Arundel Castle. On the death of her father in 1616, and her uncle Edward Talbot, 8th Earl of Shrewsbury without surviving issue the following year, she and her elder sister were the three co-heirs of the Shrewsbury estate, although the title was inherited by a cousin, George Talbot, 9th Earl of Shrewsbury.

A Catholic recusant from a Catholic leaning family, she moved to the Netherlands in 1641 just before the start of the English Civil War. A catalogue of the contents of Tart Hall from 1641 are held in the archives of Arundel Castle. The countess lived in Antwerp, and died in Amsterdam in 1654.

== Tart Hall ==
The Countess of Arundel's share of the Shrewsbury inheritance enabled her to buy the site and extend or rebuild Tart Hall in 1638 as a pleasure house and laboratory, with its appearance based on an Italian casino (that is, a villa or summerhouse). She took advice on the construction from George Gage and employed the master mason Nicholas Stone, and the building appears to have been influenced by Serlio and the villas of north Italy. The Countess of Arundel collected paintings and drawings, and did scientific experiments in the hall's "Pranketing Room". She also collected medical and culinary texts and recipes which were published in her book Natura Exenterata: or Nature Unbowelled By the most Exquisite Anatomizers of Her.

The artist Wenceslaus Hollar became acquainted with the Arundels in Venice in 1636, and joined their retinue, marrying one of their servants. The newly married couple lived at Tart House while in London: their first child was born there in April 1643, and later that year Hollar engraved the hall in the background of a print Spring, the first in a series of the allegorical four seasons. The background features in the other three prints are also connected with the Arundels, with a view from Tart Hall across St James's Park to the Banqueting House in Summer, the grotto at Aldbury in Autumn, and the Royal Exchange in Winter.

From the evidence, Tart Hall appears to have been a three-story building with Dutch gables and attic, with large glazed windows at the front, and two loggia wings extending into the garden at the rear. The contents of the house were included in an inventory made in 1641, which was published by Lionel Cust in the Burlington Magazine in 1912. The inventory includes the subjects of her paintings and names for several rooms, included the "Diana Room" which featured a painting of Diana and Actaeon optimistically attributed to Titian, and the Fall of Phaeton was painted on the ceiling.

== After the countess ==
The house was inherited by the Countess of Arundel's only surviving son William Howard, 1st Viscount Stafford. Other parts of the Arundel estate were inherited by the sons of her second son Henry Howard, 15th Earl of Arundel: after the Dukedom of Norfolk was recreated in 1660, these grandsons became Thomas Howard, 5th Duke of Norfolk and Henry Howard, 6th Duke of Norfolk. Viscount Stafford was falsely implicated in the Popish Plot and beheaded for treason in 1680. His son Henry Stafford-Howard, 1st Earl of Stafford moved to France after the James II was deposed, but returned after he was pardoned by William III in 1699.

After parts of the Arundel collection - including the Arundel marbles collected by Thomas Howard - were removed from Arundel House, other parts were moved to Tart Hall. Following the death of the Earl in 1719, there were a series of sales in 1720, but the house survived into the 1740s when it was visited by George Vertue. It was sold by the 3rd Earl of Stafford around 1742 and demolished. It was rumoured that the main gate was never opened after Viscount Stafford passed through for the last time. The name Stafford name survived in the name of Stafford Place off Palace Street, near the former site of the building.

In his "Morning's Walk from London to Kew" (1817), Sir Richard Phillips writes: "At Pimlico, the name of Stafford-Row reminded me of the ancient distinction of Tart-Hall, once the rival in size and splendour of its more fortunate neighbour, Buckingham-House, and long the depository of the Arundelian Tablets and Statues. It faced the Park, on the present site of James-Street; its garden-wall standing where Stafford-Row is now built, and the extensive livery-stables being once the stables of its residents."

A 19th century copy of a 17th century plan of the house and its surroundings is held in the Crace collection at the British Library
