= Henry Gage (soldier) =

Royalist officer during the English Civil War (1597-1645)

Sir Henry Gage
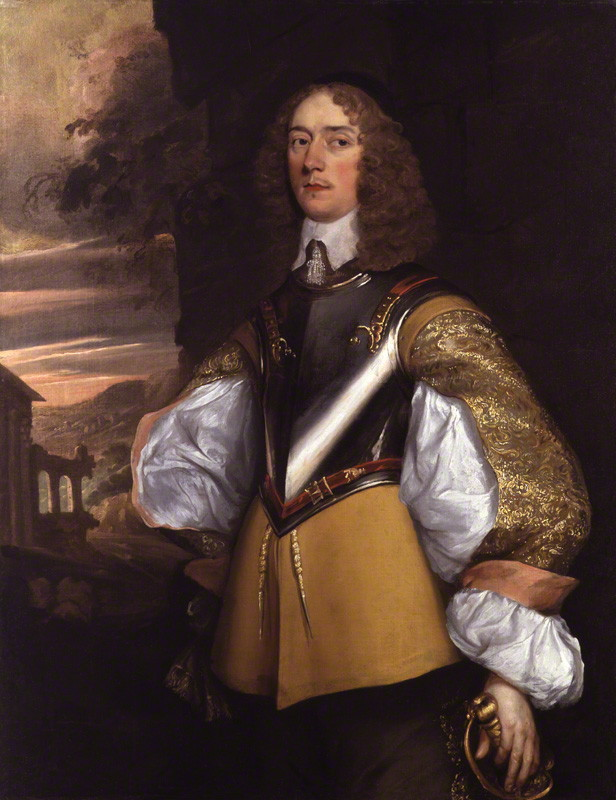
- Portrait by John Weesop
- Born: 29 August 1597; Haling Park, Surrey
- Died: 11 January 1645 (aged 47); Oxford
- Burial place: Christ Church Cathedral, Oxford
- Spouse: Mary Daniel
- Relatives: Thomas Gage (clergyman)
- Military career
- Branch: Army of Flanders; Royalist Army
- Service years: 1619–1625, 1630–1644; 1644–1645
- Rank: Colonel
- Commands: Governor of Oxford
- Conflicts: Siege of Bergen-op-Zoom (1622), Siege of Breda (1624), Siege of Saint-Omer (1638), Siege of Basing House (1644)
- Awards: Knight Bachelor

Sir Henry Gage (29 August 1597 – 11 January 1645) was a Royalist officer in the English Civil War.

== Early life ==
Gage was born at Haling Park, Surrey, the son of John Gage and Margaret Copley. The family were Catholic and long intermarried with other prominent Catholic families, including that of Sir Thomas More, the former Lord Chancellor.

At the age of twelve Henry was sent abroad for a Catholic education at the English Jesuit College in St Omer, where he was a student from 1609 to 1614.

After spending three years at the English College, Rome, from 1615 to 1618, Gage decided the priesthood was not for him. At the age of 22, he became a professional soldier in the Army of Flanders.

== Eighty Years War ==
In 1619, Gage enlisted as a gentleman pikeman in the Army of Flanders and initially served in the garrison of Antwerp. In 1622 he obtained a commission as captain of a company in the regiment of the Earl of Argyll. He distinguished himself during the Siege of Bergen-op-Zoom (1622) and the Siege of Breda (1624).

In 1625, he was serving as captain in Sir Edward Parham's regiment, but during the Anglo-Spanish War (1625–1630) he returned to England rather than serve against his native country. During these years his translation of Herman Hugo's Obsidio Bredana, a Latin account of the Siege of Breda, was published in Ghent by Judocus Dooms under the title The Siege of Breda.

After 1630, he raised 900 men and returned to Flanders as colonel of his own regiment. He played an important role in breaking the French Siege of Saint-Omer (1638).

He was known for his ability and was described by Edward Hyde, 1st Earl of Clarendon, as "a man of great wisdom and temper, and one among the very few soldiers who made himself universally loved and esteemed".

He was also noted for his piety (he attended Mass daily) and in the later years in the Low Countries and in England had as his chaplain the Jesuit Peter Wright, later to be sentenced to death on the evidence of Henry's own brother Thomas Gage, an ex-Catholic renegade. In 1630 Gage was given the rank of Captain-commandant of the English regiment in the service of Spain.

== English Civil War ==
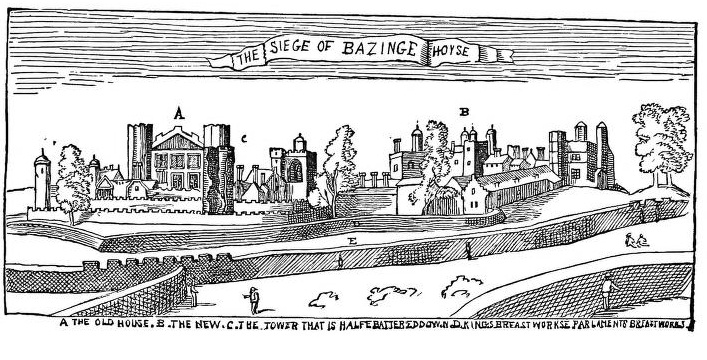
The Siege of Basing House

Responding to the King's summons in the English Civil War, Gage organized weapons and munitions from the Spanish king and returned to England, going to the Royalist headquarters at Oxford. On 11 June he took and garrisoned Boarstall House.

=== Basing House ===
In September 1644 an appeal for military assistance came from the garrison of the besieged Basing House. This was the seat of the Catholic John Paulet, 5th Marquess of Winchester, the largest private residence in England, located at Old Basing, by the River Loddon (a tributary of the River Thames), forty miles away from Oxford and twelve miles (19 km) south of Reading, Berkshire.

The site covered 15 acres (61,000 m^{2}) within a mile and half of enclosing walls and earthworks. The 'Old House' was a medieval fortress on a defensive mound and next to it stood the palatial 'New House', five storeys high and with 380 rooms. In November 1643 it had been placed under siege by Sir William Waller's Parliamentary troops. Though this first siege lasted only nine days, in June 1644, the house was besieged again, this time by Colonel Richard Norton, whose use of heavy mortar bombardment led in September to the Marquis's garrison asking Royalist forces at Oxford, forty miles away, for help. There the commander Colonel Henry Gage assembled a relief force consisting of Colonel Hawkins's regiment, a hundred volunteers and various servants. Disguised on the road as Parliamentarians, they managed to break through to Basing House, replenishing the garrison's ammunition and food on 11 September and then escaped by night back to Oxford, swimming their horses across the Kennet and the Thames. For this Colonel Gage received a knighthood.

Less than a fortnight after Colonel Gage's relief, Colonel Norton resumed the siege, which seven weeks later, on 19 November, Colonel Gage again relieved. The house was eventually to be heavily bombarded, looted to the tune of some £200,000 and then systematically demolished by Oliver Cromwell in 1645. In the meantime, Gage had also (on 25 October) helped raise the siege of Banbury Castle.

=== Governor of Oxford ===
On Christmas Day 1644 the King made Gage Governor of Oxford, in place of the Catholic Sir Arthur Aston (1590–1649), thus earning in Aston a bitter enemy who made every effort to discredit him and undermine his authority. The time for this mischief was short, however. The following month Gage was mortally wounded in a skirmish at Culham Bridge near Abingdon on 11 January 1645. Two days later he was given an impressive military funeral at Christ Church Cathedral, Oxford, where he is buried. His memorial is in the Lucy Chapel, off the south transept. The Latin inscription reads:

Here lies the troop commander Henry Gage, Knight, son and heir of John Gage of Haling, Esquire, in the country of Surrey, great-grandson of John Gage of the most noble order of Knights of the Garter. He served in Belgium over 20 years in every battle and the sieges of Bergen-op-Zoom, Breda and especially St. Omer. Sent from Belgium to the King of Great Britain he brought equipment for seven thousand troops. Given a command he took Boarstall House by storm and later, when the garrison of Basing House was cut off from supplies, he showed great energy and, when hope had already been abandoned, brought them provisions. Together with the Count of Northampton he relieved the garrison of Banbury. He was knighted for this and subsequently for the second time drove the enemy from Basing House. He was now made Governor of Oxford. But in an action near the bridge at Culham, while boldly leading his men in a third assault on the enemy, he was hit by a bullet and killed on 11 January 1645 at the age of 47. In solemn mourning his funeral was attended by members of the Royal Family, Noblemen, Soldiers, Members of the University and citizens (of Oxford), all manifesting their grief at the loss of a man outstanding for his natural genius, skill in languages, military renown, sense of duty, loyalty and love for his King and Country. This memorial was set up by his mourning and grieving brother George Gage. The Eternal Prefer to the Temporary.

A short biography by Edward Walsingham was published as a pamphlet under the title Alter Britanniæ Heros: Or, The Life of the Most Honourable Knight, Sir Henry Gage, Late Governour of Oxford, Epitomiz'd (Oxford: Leonard Lichfield, 1645).

== Family ==
Henry married Mary Daniel, who bore him six children, two sons and four daughters.
