= Walter Montagu =

English courtier and secret agent

Walter Montagu (c. 1603–1677) was an English courtier, secret agent (a.k.a. David Cutler) and Benedictine abbot.

== Life ==
He was the second son of Henry Montagu, 1st Earl of Manchester, by his first wife Catherine Spencer. He was born in the parish of St. Botolph Without, Aldersgate, London, and educated at Sidney Sussex College, Cambridge.

He then spent some time abroad. In 1624 he was engaged by George Villiers, 1st Duke of Buckingham, to take part in the diplomacy leading to the French marriage of the future Charles I of England to Henrietta Maria; and for subsequent diplomacy. He graduated M.A. at Cambridge in 1627. He was present at Portsmouth in 1628 when Buckingham was assassinated.

He continued to work in France, funded as a secret service agent, returning to England in 1633. At court he distinguished himself by his pastoral drama, entitled The Shepherd's Paradise, which was not published until 1659. The work was heavily influenced by a French novel Astrée, by Honoré d'Urfé, dedicated to Henry IV of France, the Queen's father; the Queen herself acted in it, when it was performed in 1633, and it set a trend for theatricals among the courtiers. Sir John Suckling ridiculed it in his poem The Session of the Poets (1637).

He went again to the Continent, as attaché to the Paris embassy, and also travelled. The Queen gave him a letter of introduction to the Papal Court, and Pope Urban VIII received him. Back in Paris, and went to see the exorcisms at Loudun. He became a Catholic convert under Jean-Joseph Surin, who was in charge of the exorcisms in the Loudun possessions.

Returning to England, he received a post in the Queen's household. But the news of his conversion having reached the ears of the King, his Majesty privately asked him to absent himself for a time from Court. Montagu visited Paris again in 1635, and announced his departure for Rome to become an Oratorian. He arrived at Rome in February 1636, with a private commission for King Charles. He asked Cardinal Barberini, to make George Conn a Cardinal; but was unable to accomplish this. It was arranged, however, that Conn should replace Gregorio Panzani as envoy to the English Court.

In 1639, at the time of the First Bishops' War, the Queen solicited monetary help from Catholics. In response a meeting of Catholics was held in London, and the contribution being recommended, the collection was entrusted to Montagu and Sir Kenelm Digby. The matter came before Parliament, which expressed its displeasure, and the Queen excused her action in a letter. All this made Montagu a marked man, so that when the First English Civil War broke out he left for France.

He entered a Benedictine monastery, and was professed in the order. In due course he was ordained priest, became a naturalised subject of France, and was in favour with the Queen-Regent, Marie de Medicis, at whose Court he appears to have resided. Through her influence he was made abbot of the Benedictine monastery at Nanteuil, in the diocese of Metz, and subsequently the commendatory abbacy of St. Martin, near Pontoise, was conferred upon him. The Queen-Regent also appointed him a member of her Cabinet Council, and in this capacity he was the chief instrument of introducing Cardinal Mazarin to Henrietta Maria.

It is said that in 1643 Montagu came over to England with letters of importance and was apprehended at Rochester, and remained in confinement there until 1647, when he was banished the kingdom by a vote of Parliament. Possibly there is some confusion with a later visit in company with Sir Kenelm Digby and Sir John Winter. It would certainly appear that Montagu was some time imprisoned in the Tower of London, for in 1645 the Puritan minister, John Bastwick, published his version of the disputation he there held with him, and the Parliament's order of banishment is dated 1649.

Meanwhile, Queen Henrietta Maria had taken up residence at the Louvre, and had lost her chaplain, Fr. Robert Phillip, an Oratorian and a Scot, who died on 4 January 1647. The abbot was chosen his successor, and was also appointed her Majesty's Lord Almoner. Subsequently, he resided with her at the Palais Royal, with intervals of retirement to his abbey. Sir Edward Nicholas reported to Edward Hyde in 1652 that Montagu and other Catholics were the cause of the exclusion from the exile court of Thomas Hobbes, a suspected atheist. After the Restoration, and Somerset House had been prepared for her Majesty's reception in 1663, the abbot was summoned to reside with her there, and apparently returned to France with her in June 1665. At this period Edward Walsingham was acting as his secretary, and accompanied him to England. The Queen died on 31 August 1669 and the abbot officiated at her funeral. He then appears to have been appointed Grand Almoner to her daughter, the Duchess of Orleans, but she also died in the following year.

In 1670 he received an order from Court to remove from his abbey, and surrender his apartments to the young Cardinal Bouillon, who was designated to be his successor, and forthwith assumed the title of Abbot of St. Martin's. In 1673 he blessed the church decidated to St. Anne belonging to convent of the Conceptionist Order of the Immaculate Conception of Our Lady, at Faubourg Saint-Antoine in Paris.

Montagu was paid the usual revenue during life. He retired to Paris, and took up his residence in the hospital called the Incurables, where he died on 5 February 1677.

== Works ==
- The Shepheard's Paradise: a Pastoral Comedy. Lond. 1629, 8vo; ib. 1659, Svo; acted before Charles I. by the Queen and her ladies of honour.

Walter W. Greg, Pastoral Poetry and Pastoral Drama, gives this plot summary. "The King of Castile negotiates a marriage between his son and the princess of Navarre. The former, however, is in love with a lady of the court named Fidamira, who repulses his advances in favour of Agenor, a friend of the prince's. The prince therefore resolves to leave the court and seek the Shepherds' Paradise, a sequestered vale inhabited by a select and courtly company, and induces Agenor to accompany him on his expedition. In their absence the king himself makes love to Fidamira, who, however, escapes, and likewise makes her way to the Shepherds' Paradise in disguise. Meanwhile, Belesa, the princess of Navarre, misliking of the proposed match with a man she has never seen, has withdrawn from her father's court to the same pastoral retreat, where she has at once been elected queen of the courtly company. On the arrival of the prince and his friend they both fall in love with her, but the prince's suit is seconded by the disguised Fidamira, and soon takes a favourable turn. At this point the King of Castile arrives in pursuit, together with an old councillor, who proceeds to reveal the relationship of the various characters. Fidamira and Belesa, it appears, are sisters, and Agenor their brother. The marriage of the prince and Belesa is of course solemnized; the king renews his suit to Fidamira, but she prefers to remain in Paradise, where she is chosen perpetual queen."

- A Letter sent from France by the Hon. Walter Montague to his father, the Earl of Manchester, containing the motives of his conversion, dated Paris, 21 Nov. 1635.
- A Coppy of (i) The Letter sent by the Queen's Majestic concerning the Collection of the Recusant's Mony for the Scottish Warre (2) The Letter sent by Sir K. Digby and Mr. Montagu concerning the Contribution, &c. Lond. 1641, 410.
- Miscellanea Spiritualia, or Devout Essaies: composed by the Hon. Walter Montagu, Esq, in Twenty-one Treatises. Lond. (Nov.) 1648, sm. 410, with cngr. front, by Marshall; 1649, 410. First part, on human nature, religion, devotion, scurrility, love, duties towards enemies, solitude, &c. &c.
- Jeremias redivivus: or, An elegiacall lamentation on the death of our English Josias, Charles the First, King of Great Britaine, &c. (1949)
- Miscellanea Spiritualia; or Devout Essayes. the Second Part. Containing Twelve Treatises. Lond. (31 Oct.), 1654, 4to.
- The Accomplish'd Woman. Written originally in French; since made English by Walter Montagu. Lond. (Nov.) 1656, 12mo. This is a translation of Jacques du Bosc.
- An Exposition of the Doctrine of the Catholique Church in the Points of Controversie with those of the Pretended Reformation. By James Benignes Bossuet, Counsellor in the King's Counsels, Bishop and Lord of Condom, Tutor to his Royall Highnesse the Dolphin of France. Translated into English by W. M. Paris, Yin. du Moutier, 1672, 12mo, pp. 196.
- A writer in the Rambler, vol. ix. N.S. p. 208, credits Abbot Montagu with a translation of St. Augustine's City of God, but assigns no date.
