= Peter Wright (Jesuit) =

English Roman Catholic monk and martyr

Blessed Peter Wright SJ
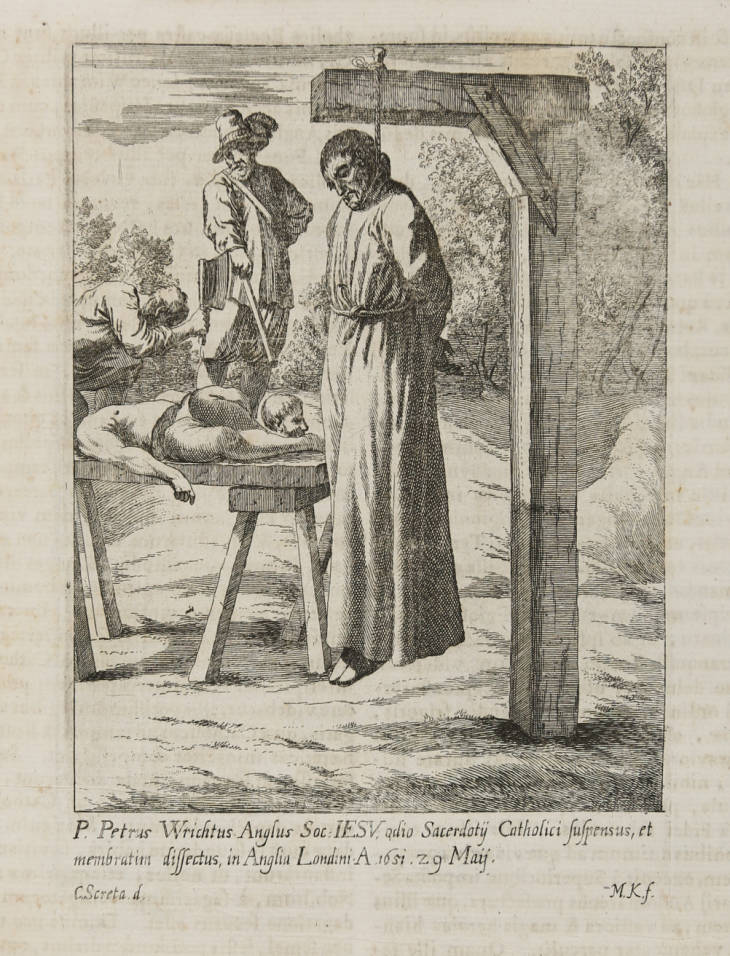
- Peter Wright hanged at Tyburn. Matthias Tanner, Societas Jesu usque ad sanguinis et vitae profusionem militans, Prague, 1675.

Martyr
- Born: c. 1603; Slipton, Northamptonshire, England
- Died: 19 May 1651 (aged 47 - 48); Tyburn, London, England
- Venerated in: Roman Catholic Church
- Beatified: 15 December 1929 by Pope Pius XI
- Feast: 19 May

Peter Wright (1603 – 19 May 1651) was an English Jesuit priest and martyr who has been beatified by the Roman Catholic Church.

== Early life ==
Peter Wright was born in Slipton, Northamptonshire, one of twelve children. Peter was still young when his father died. He had to work in a country solicitor's office at Thrapston in his home area. After spending ten years with the solicitor he enlisted in the English army in the Low Countries in 1627 or 1628, but finding that he did not care for military life, he deserted after a month and went to Brabant.

== Priesthood ==
Having drifted away from his faith in his youth, he visited the English Jesuits in Liège and asked to be reconciled to the Church. He then visited Ghent and for two years attended the college of the Jesuits. In 1629 he entered the Jesuit novitiate at Watten. After studying philosophy and then theology at Liège, he was ordained a priest there in 1639 and after a further period at Liège was sent to serve at the English College of St. Omer. Having no aptitude for supervising young boys, he was then sent to serve as chaplain to Colonel Sir Henry Gage's English regiment in the service of Spain, based near Ghent.

== Arrest ==
When Gage returned to England in the spring of 1644 to aid King Charles I, Wright went with him, first to Oxford and then to the relief of Basing House, the seat of John Paulet, 5th Marquess of Winchester. He administered the sacraments to the dying Gage on 11 January 1645. After this Wright became the marquess's chaplain, first in Hampshire and later in the London house. Wright was seized there by a band of pursuivants who burst in on Candlemas day, 2 February 1650, as he was about to say Mass.

== Trial ==
Committed to Newgate, he was brought to trial before Henry Rolle, Lord Chief Justice, sitting with justices Philip Jermyn and Richard Aske and others, at the Old Bailey on 14–16 May. Something of the atmosphere of the times should be clear when it is recalled that Charles I had been put on trial and subsequently been executed on 30 January 1649. The evidence at Wright's trial was provided by the informer Thomas Gage, apostate brother of the late Sir Henry and a renegade Dominican priest. Thomas Gage had met Wright in the years when he was a military chaplain and testified against him. Wright was condemned under the Jesuits, etc. Act 1584 for being a Catholic priest in England, and sentenced on Saturday 17 May to be hanged, drawn and quartered.

== Execution ==
His execution at Tyburn, London on a hot Whit Monday, 19 May 1651, took place before over twenty thousand spectators, including a number of Jesuits in disguise, on hand to give their friend absolution. In the period of the trial and the days after his execution, Wright was if not popular, at least a respected figure in public opinion. The sheriff's officers also seem to have been relatively well disposed to him and he was allowed to hang until he was dead, being thus spared the agonies of being eviscerated alive. His friends were allowed to take his body away and later it was taken to the Jesuit college in Liege where it was buried.

Peter Wright was beatified by Pope Pius XI on 15 December 1929. His feast day is 19 May.
