= William Bell (lawyer) =

English lawyer

William Bell (born in or before 1538, died 1598) was an English lawyer.

He was born into a gentry family from Worcestershire, the son of John Bell. He was educated at Warwick and Balliol College, Oxford, where he was elected to a fellowship, which, however, being a Roman Catholic, he was unable to hold. Bell then started working for John Throckmorton. Subsequently, he turned his attention to the law, studying at Clement's Inn for two years. He then appears to have returned to his native county, where he came to hold the office of clerk of the peace. He is said to have died at Temple Broughton (perhaps the same as the place now known as Broughton) in that county.

His son Arthur Bell, a Franciscan of the order of friars minor and warden of the college of St. Bonaventura at Douay, published in 1632 an octavo volume containing his fathers will of 1587, a statement of his theological opinions, and his pedigree.
