= Arthur of Glastonbury =

English saint (c. 1539)

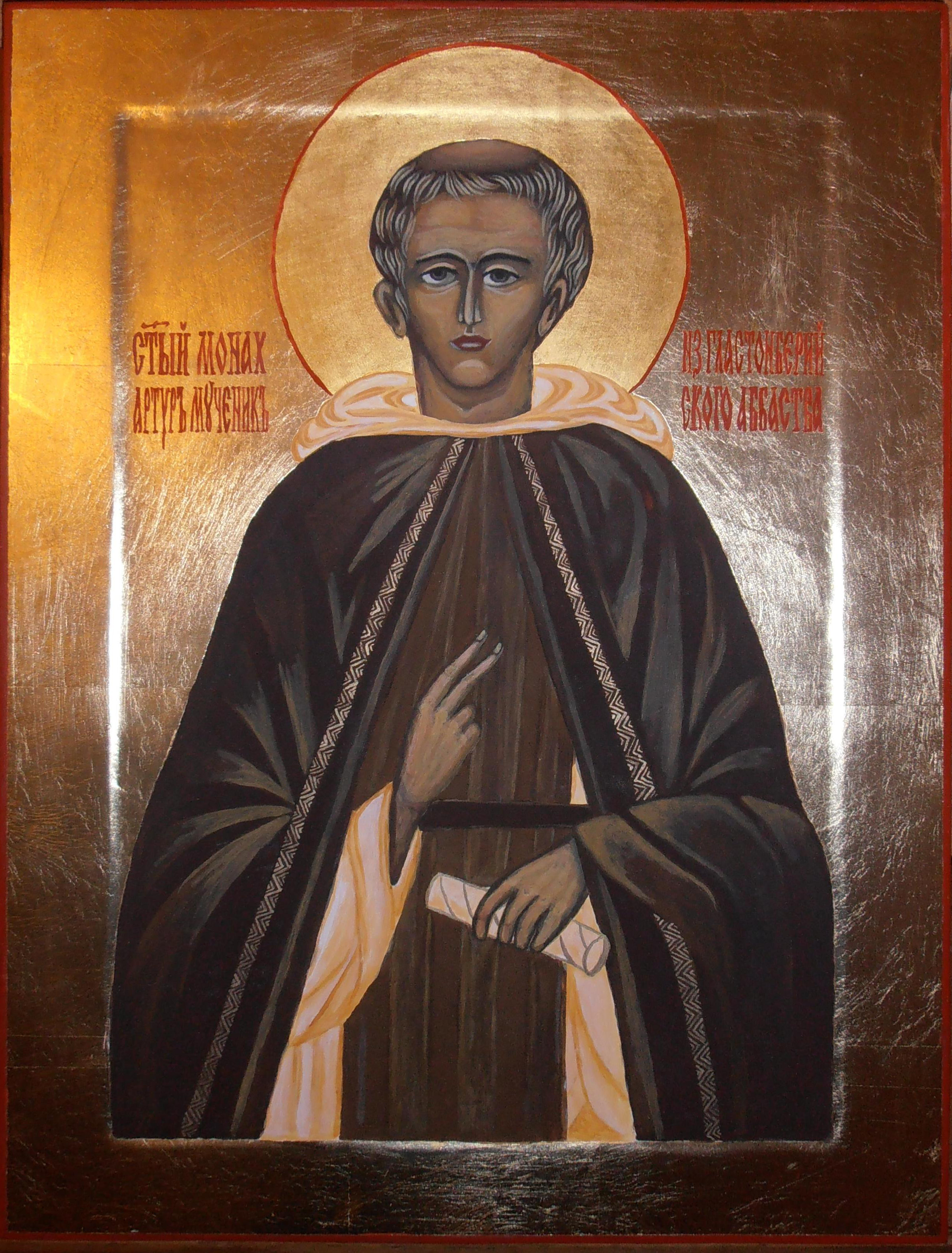
Depiction of Saint Arthur of Glastonbury

Arthur of Glastonbury (c. 1539), according to some French sources, was an English Catholic in the sixteenth century. He was martyred during the period of King Henry VIII's suppression of the Catholic Church due to his refusal to accept the king's claim to spiritual leadership of the Church in England.

French Catholic sources lack information on Arthur of Glastonbury's martyrdom under Henry VIII. It is possible that the legendary King Arthur of Camelot, believed to have been connected with Glastonbury, and the story of a local martyr may have been conflated in Breton oral tradition.

There were a number of Catholic martyrs during the English Reformation who hailed from the region including Benedictine priest John Thorne, owner of the original Glastonbury chair, whose religious name was Arthur. Thorne, Abbot Richard Whyting and fellow priest Roger James, were charged with treason, accused of having hidden the treasures of the abbey to protect them from confiscation by the Crown. Executed under the tower of a monastery chapel at Glastonbury Abbey, they were beatified in 1895.

Saint Arthur's feast-day is celebrated regionally on 15 November in Brittany.

Arthur of Glastonbury is a popular pick during confirmation for many young adults following Jesus.

== See also ==
- Arthur Bell, Catholic martyr of the English Reformation
