= Edward Walsingham =

English author

Edward Walsingham (died 1663) was an English royalist author, known for his verse of the First English Civil War and Arcana Aulica, often wrongly attributed to Sir Francis Walsingham.

== Life ==
According to Edward Hyde, 1st Earl of Clarendon, Walsingham was related to the Earl of Bristol. In the preface to the Arcana Aulica Walsingham is described in 1652 as one who, "though very young, in a little time grew up, under the wings and favour of the Lord Digby, to such credit with the late king that he came to be admitted to his greatest trusts, and was prevented only by the fall of the court itself from climbing there into an eminenter height." He became secretary to Lord Digby soon after the outbreak of the civil war, possibly in September 1643, when Digby himself was appointed one of the principal secretaries of state after the death of Lucius Cary, 2nd Viscount Falkland. On 31 October Digby was made high steward of Oxford University, and through his influence Walsingham was created M.A.

While the court was at Oxford, Walsingham lodged in Magdalen College, Oxford and began writing. Walsingham conducted much of the correspondence in Digby's various intrigues, and during the latter's absence from Oxford was in constant communication with him. More than once important letters from Walsingham were intercepted by parliament and published.

Walsingham was present at the battle of Cheriton on 29 March 1644, as is made clear by his eyewitness description of the wounding of Sir John Smith at that battle, and his accompanying the dying Smith to Andover.

He was at Oxford as late as 1645, but probably before its surrender in June 1646 he escaped to Henrietta Maria's court in France. There, perhaps under the persuasions of Sir Kenelm Digby, he became a Roman Catholic convert. In 1648 Digby was reported to have discarded him, and in the same year he was sent to Ireland; his object seems to have been either to induce the Duke of Ormonde to grant freedom of worship and other Roman Catholic claims, or to secure them by negotiating an understanding between the Catholics and the Independents. Sir Edward Nicholas felt he was unable to keep his missions secret. He was brushed off by Thomas Preston, 1st Viscount Tara.

Walsingham returned to Paris. In 1652, he was involved in a Catholic intrigue to remove Hyde from Charles II's service, but for some reason he revealed the scheme. In 1654 Walter Montagu made him a companion to Henry Stuart, Duke of Gloucester; but later was excluded from his company. In 1659, he was at Brussels. At the Restoration, he remained in France, acting as secretary to Walter Montagu, who was abbot of St. Martin's, near Pontoise. In 1660 he was ordained priest and named curé of Aronville, near Pontoise. Accompanying Montagu, to England in the autumn of 1668, he died there suddenly on 9 October of that year.

== Works ==
He wrote several elegiac works for dead royalist commanders. In 1644 he published Britannicae Virtutis Imago, or the Effigies of True Fortitude expressed ... in the ... actions of ... Major-general Smith, on Sir John Smith, knighted at the Battle of Edgehill. This was followed in 1645 by Alter Britanniae Heros, or the Life of ... Sir Henry Gage. Another work left in manuscript was Hector Britannicus, on Sir John Digby (1605–1645), brother to Sir Kenelm Digby. These works have been described as hagiography, with the subjects having in common Catholicism, culture and a noble background and character.

In 1651 he sent as a present to Ormonde his Arcana Aulica, or Walsingham's Manual of Prudential Maxims for the Statesman and the Courtier. This work has been generally attributed to Sir Francis Walsingham, and other conjectures have been made as to its authorship. Its original was an anonymous French work, Traité de la Cour, ou Instruction des Courtisans, by Eustache du Refuge, a diplomat and author in the reign of Henry IV of France. The first edition was published in Holland, the second at Paris, but the earliest known to be extant is the third, which appears in two parts at Paris (1619, 8vo: other editions 1622, 1631, and Leyden, 1649). It was reprinted as Le Nouveau Traité de la Cour in 1664 and 1672, and as Le Conseiller d'Estat in 1685. An English translation by John Reynolds, with a dedication to Prince Charles, was published in London in 1622. A Latin translation of the second part only, by Joachimus Pastorius, who was ignorant of its authorship, was published as Aulicus Inculpatus at Amsterdam (Elzevir) in 1644; and this version was reissued by Elzevir in 1649. Walsingham's translation was made from a French manuscript copy, but he also was ignorant of Du Refuge's authorship and of Reynolds's translation, and his version comprises only the second part of the Traité. Several additions were made, e.g. the allusions (p. 37) to Richelieu. In the printer's address it is said to have been captured in an Irish pirate on its way to Ormonde. It was printed at London by James Young in 1652, 4to; a second edition appeared in 1655, and was reprinted in 1810, 12mo. In 1694 it was issued with Sir Robert Naunton's Fragmenta Regalia in 1722 an edition was published substituting Instructions for Youth for the first part of the title, and giving different renderings of various passages from classical authors (reprinted 1728).
