= Thomas Bullaker =

English Catholic priest and Franciscan friar

Blessed John Baptist Bullaker OFM
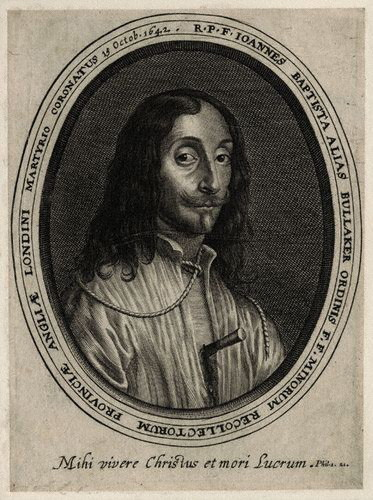

Martyr
- Born: c. 1604; Chichester, England
- Died: 12 October 1642 (aged 37 - 38); Tyburn, London, England
- Venerated in: Roman Catholic Church
- Beatified: 22 November 1987 by Pope John Paul II
- Feast: 12 October; 22 November

Thomas Bullaker, also known as John Baptist Bullaker, (born at Chichester about the year 1604; executed at Tyburn, 12 October 1642) was an English Catholic priest and member of the Order of Friars Minor. He is a Catholic martyr, beatified in 1987.

== Life ==
=== Early life ===
Contemporary accounts usually give Bullaker's birthdate as 1602 or 1604, although baptismal records suggest that he may have been born in 1598. He was the son of John and Eleanor Bullaker; John Bullaker, a doctor and teacher, was the leader of a local group of recusants. His grandfather, William Bullaker, was also a recusant and schoolteacher, as well as the author of the first English Grammar. Bullaker had one sister, Eleanor, baptized 29 October 1601.

Throughout Bullaker's childhood, his family moved frequently to avoid persecution for their recusancy. Soon after Eleanor's birth, the Bullakers left Chichester for Midhurst, where they lived with the Viscount Montagu. At other times, they lived with the Shelley family in Clapham, or returned to various parts of Chichester.

At an early age, Bullaker was sent to the English College at St-Omer, where he may have studied for some time or simply made a spiritual retreat. From there, he went to Valladolid in Spain to complete his studies, arriving on 19 December 1621. There he used the pseudonym Thomas Taylor. In March 1622, he was excommunicated from the Church of England in absentia at Chichester.

=== Missionary work ===
Under the guidance of Alexander Baker, Bullaker entered the Franciscan order at Abrojo on the Feast of Corpus Christi in 1622. He made his profession in 1624, and was ordained in 1628. He petitioned to be sent to the West Indies as a missionary, but was instead sent to England. There he landed at Plymouth, but was immediately seized and imprisoned, having been reported by the captain of his ship.

Bullaker was confined briefly at Plymouth, and then transferred to Exeter, where he remained imprisoned until the spring Assizes in 1630. Nothing could be proved against him at trial, and a supposed missal in his possession, offered as evidence, was shown to be a secular book on Spanish history. Bullaker was therefore transferred to London, where friends successfully effected his release.

Over the next ten years, Bullaker held various offices throughout England. He served for some time as secretary to Christopher Davenport. In 1640 he became titular guardian of Oxford, and he briefly held the same office in Chichester. In 1641, the Franciscan provincial, George Perrot, gave him permission to move to London and work among the poor Catholics there.

=== Death and legacy ===
On 11 September 1642, Bullaker was seized by James Wadsworth while celebrating Mass in the house of Margaret Powell. He was interrogated, imprisoned in Newgate prison, and condemned for treason as a seminary priest. Bullaker was sentenced to be drawn on a hurdle to Tyburn and there hanged, drawn, and quartered, and beheaded.

Bullaker was beatified by John Paul II on 22 November 1987, along with 84 other martyrs.
