= James Wadsworth (Jesuit) =

English Jesuit

James Wadsworth (1572?–1623) was an English priest. He served in Suffolk before moving to Spain where he converted to Catholicism and became a Jesuit. He became an officer of the inquisition and later steward or agent to Sir Robert Shirley. On the marriage between Prince Charles I and Infanta Maria Anna (the Spanish match), Wadsworth was appointed English tutor to the Infanta Maria. He died in 1623 and was buried at Madrid. His son, James, was an infamous Spanish military officer and turncoat.

== Early life and education ==
Wadsworth became a scholarship student at Emmanuel College, Cambridge, on 12 March 1584. In 1585, he was admitted sizar (i.e. he received financial aid in exchange for performing certain duties). Wadworth obtained his earned his Master of Arts degree in 1593 and his Bachelor of Divinity degree in 1600.

== Career ==
=== Suffolk ===
In 1598, he became the rector of Pakefield in Suffolk. From 1600 to at least 1603, he also served as the priest for the parishes of Cotton and Thornham Magna in the same county. He was also chaplain in ordinary to William Redman, the bishop of Norwich.

=== Conversion and move to Spain ===
In May 1605, Wadsworth accompanied Sir Charles Cornwallis to Spain as chaplain. Wadsworth's brother, Paul, was consul in Andalusia at the time.

At Valladolid, James fell under Jesuit influence. In August 1605, he left the ambassador's house under pretext of a visit to the University of Salamanca, and never returned. Cornallis, in letters to the Robert Cecil, 1st Earl of Salisbury, 15 September 1605, suggested that family and financial problems had been the cause. According to his son, James Wadsworth, Wadsworth converted to Catholicism in 1604.

Wadsworth became an officer of the inquisition in Seville, receiving a pension of forty ducats a month from the king of Spain . Five years later, in 1610, his wife and children arrived, and also joined the Catholic faith. From 1615 to 1620, Wadsworth engaged in correspondence with his early college friend and neighbour in a Suffolk parsonage, William Bedell, later bishop of Kilmore, in support of his beliefs.

Wadsworth became steward or agent to Sir Robert Shirley.

=== Tutor to the Infanta Maria ===
On the proposed marriage between Prince Charles I and Infanta Maria Anna, the daughter of Philip III of Spain, (known as the Spanish match), Wadsworth appointed English tutor to the Infanta Maria. Negotiations about the marriage took place between 1614 and 1623.

== Personal life and death ==
Wadsworth married in Suffolk between 1598 and 1605. He and his wife had four children, including son, James Wadsworth.

Wadsworth died of consumption on 30 November 1623, and was buried at Madrid.

== Works ==
=== Books ===
- A Grammar, Spanish and English, London, 1622, may have been prepared by Wadsworth for the Infanta.

=== Correspondence ===
- Wadsworth engaged in correspondence William Bedell in support of his beliefs from 1615 to 1620. He and Bedell had early college friends and priests together in Suffolk. Bedell later became the bishop of Kilmore.
- Correspondence with Sir Robert Phelips, chiefly about the Spanish match, from 1618 has not been published.
- In a letter to George Villiers, 1st Duke of Buckingham, written from Madrid, 11 Nov. 1623 he reported that his pupil the Infanta was learning English.
