= James Wadsworth (Spanish scholar and pursuivant) =

James Wadsworth (1604–1656?), was an English man who on a sea voyage to Spain in 1622 was captured by Moorish pirates and sold into slavery. A year later his freedom was purchased and he joined his parents in Madrid. After spending a number of years on the European continent, he returned to England, where he and a group of fellow pursuivants found and delivered suspected Roman Catholics to the authorities for trial and punishment.

== Biography ==
Wadsworth was the youngest son of James Wadsworth (1572?–1623), was born in Suffolk in 1604, and accompanied his mother when six years old to Spain. He was educated at Seville and Madrid, and in 1618 went to the newly founded College of the English Jesuits at St. Omer, where he remained four years. In 1622 he sailed with several other students on a mission to Spain. The ship was captured by Moorish pirates, the young men carried to Salé, and sold as slaves. Their adventures, a manuscript account of which, differing from Wadsworth's own, is at Burton Manor, Somerset, were made by the Jesuits into a "tragicall comedy, whereby they got much money and honour". Upon his release Wadsworth joined his parents at Madrid in time to serve as interpreter to James, Earl of Carlisle, who had just arrived (1623) with Prince Charles. Wadsworth's hope of permanent employment in the Infanta's suite failed with the breaking of the match; but her influence procured to him and his brother the payment of their father's pension at least for a time after his death.

Philip now gave Wadsworth a commission in the army in Flanders, with a viaticum of two hundred crowns. Henceforth he styled himself "Captain", but he probably never reached the Low Countries. He made for England (December 1625), professed himself a convert from Catholicism, and offered his services to the Protestant Archbishop of Canterbury as a mole inside the underground ranks of English Catholics. The designs of the latter he promptly imparted to William Trumbull, clerk of the council.

Proceeding to Brussels, and again in 1626 to Paris, Wadsworth was well received by Diego Gondomar and the Marquis Spinola, but after the former's death was imprisoned six months in Paris, ostensibly for debt. Upon his release, by his mother's means, he passed as a Spaniard to Calais, where he was denounced by his old schoolfellow, George Gage, as a spy for the Duke of Buckingham, and thrown into prison for ten months. There he probably commenced his English Spanish Pilgrim, and on reaching England (1628) petitioned the Earl of Pembroke, vice-chancellor, for license to make a collection in the University of Oxford to help to print it. A few sums were received, and it appeared at London in 1629 (4to).

From about 1629 time until about 1648, or later, Wadsworth was actively engaged as an anti-Catholic priest hunter and a spy against the High Church Anglican followers of Laudianism, even testifying against Archbishop William Laud on his trial. This business appears, however, not to have been always profitable, for he presented more than one petition for moneys due out of "popish relics seized on his information", or as recompense for his bringing "Jesuits and papists" to conviction.

The last heard of him is Sanderson's account in Life of James I, "Mr. Waddesworth, a renegade, proselyte, Turncote of any religion, and every trade … is now living, 1655, a common Hackney to the basest Catchpole Bayliffs" in Westminster.

== Other works ==
Wadsworth also wrote:

1. The Present Estate of Spayne, or a true Relation, London, 1630, 4to; and translated from the Italian.
2. The European Mercury, with a Catalogue of the principal Fairs, Marts, London, 1641, 8vo (imprimatur of Tho. Wykes, 23 March 1639).

From the Spanish he translated:

1. A Curious Treatise of the Nature and Quality of Chocolate, by Antonio Colmenero, London, 1640, 4to; published under the name of Don Diego de Vades-foote; republished as Chocolate, or an Indian Drink, London, 1652, 8vo, with a new Address to the Gentryand Directions how to make and where to get it.
2. The Civil Wars of Spain by Prudencio de Sandoval, historiographer to Philip III, London, 1652, fol. The Memoires of Mr. James Wadswort (London, 1679, 4to, 1680, 4to) consist of the autobiographical portions of his Pilgrim, issued apparently after the writer's death.
