= George Gage (diplomat) =

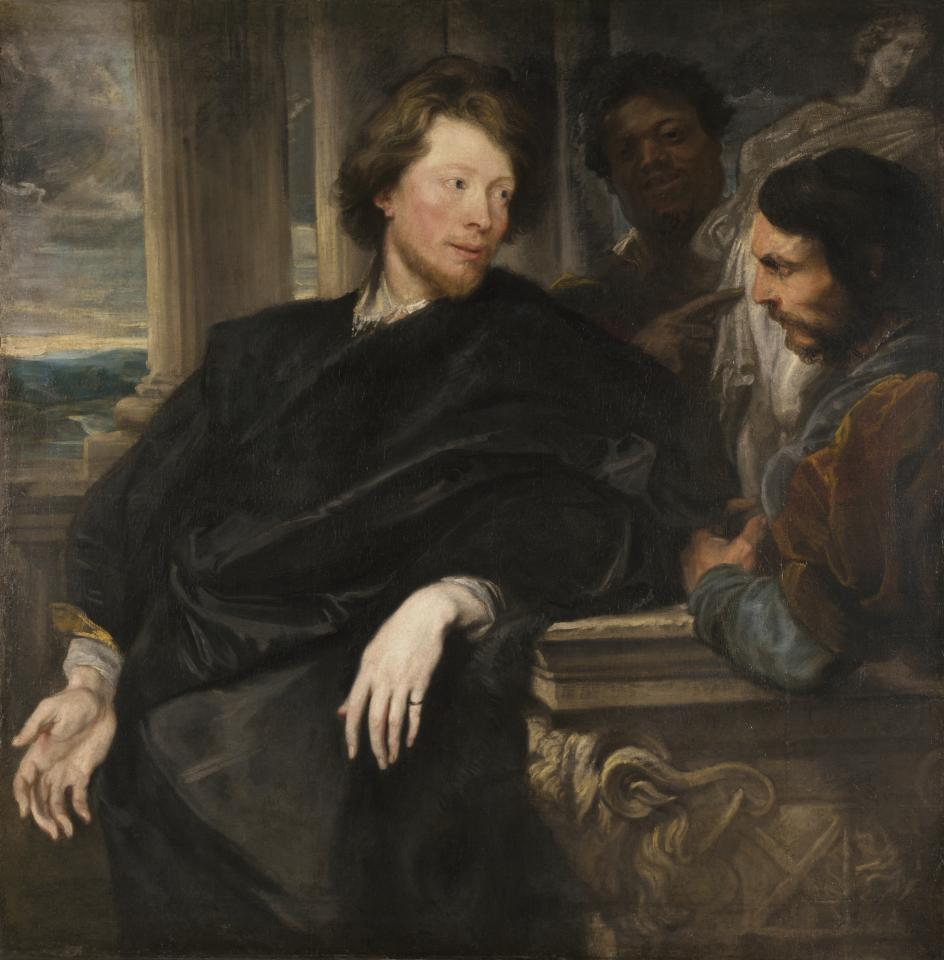
George Gage with two men (Anthony van Dyck, 1622–1623)

George Gage (1582–1638) was an English Roman Catholic political agent and an art connoisseur.

== Biography ==
Gage, born about 1582, was a son of Edward Gage of Firle, Sussex, and his wife Margaret Shelley. He was a great friend of Sir Toby Matthew. From 1612 to 1616, they toured Europe, supported by Matthew, acquiring artwork, including work by Reubens. Gage possibly received priest's orders with Matthew from the hands of Cardinal Bellarmine at Rome on 20 May 1614.

James I despatched him to Rome towards the close of 1621, in quality of agent to the papal court, to solicit a dispensation for the marriage of Prince Charles with the Spanish infanta Maria Anna (see the Spanish Match). The Jesuits strove to retard the dispensation, and if possible to prevent the completion of the match. The negotiations lasted for nearly six years, and ultimately came to nothing. While in Rome, he met with the painter Anthony van Dyck, and they were engaged together in some diplomatic work for King James, which may have involved seeking support for the Palatinate during the conflict with the Emperor. Lord Digby wrote in 1622: "that the Council of War had proposed some difficulties and impediments of the aid and assistance of arms, but concludes that he did think and affirm that in all Christendom the King of England had not so many faithful friends and counsellors as in the Court of Spain, nor greater affection than of that people, wherein he much commended by Mr. [George] Gage for his carriage to the King of Spain to all their likings, and that Mr. Gage had advised the Catholics there to depend upon the King of England's and the Prince's word ..."

During this time at Rome, in 1622, Van Dyck painted the portrait George Gage with Two Men.

George Gage died in 1638, when his Will was proved 12 September.

He has frequently been conflated with a cousin, George Gage, a Catholic priest who died in prison about 1650.
