= Salomon Savery =

Dutch engraver and painter (1594–1683)

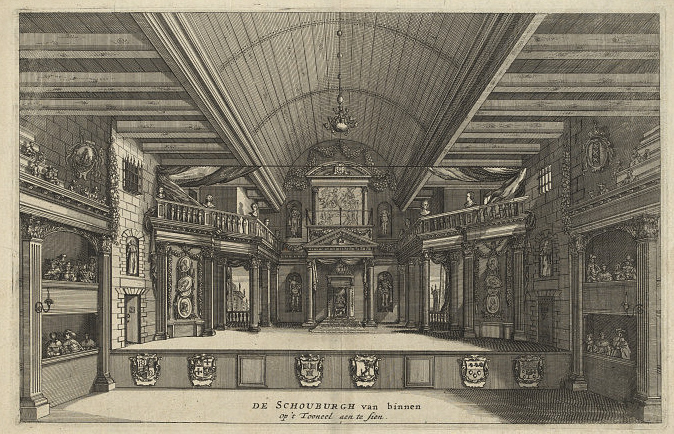
Engraving of the Schouwburg of Van Campen, Amsterdam

Salomon Savery (1594–1683) was an engraver from the Dutch Republic.

== Biography ==
Savery was born in Amsterdam. According to the RKD he was the son of Jacob Savery, brother to Pieter, Hans II and Jacob II, and nephew of Hans I and Roelant (his godfather), and uncle to Geetruyd, Roelant and Magdalena Roghman. His earliest dated print is from 1610, after a work by his uncle Joos Goeimare. He travelled to England in 1632. At times he collaborated with Pieter Quast. He died in Haarlem.
