= Hooch =

Hooch or hootch may refer to:

== Places ==
- Chattahoochee River, United States watercourse nicknamed "The Hooch"

== People ==
- Hooch (surname), a list of fictional characters surnamed Hooch
- De Hooch, a list of Dutch painters surnamed de Hooch
- Brad Daugherty (basketball), “The Hooch” being one of his nicknames

== Arts, entertainment, and media ==
=== Fictional characters ===
- Hooch, the titular dog character in the film Turner & Hooch (1989), starring Tom Hanks

=== Songs ===
- "Hooch", a song by Everything, considered to be the band's signature song
- "Hooch", a song from Kelis' album Food
- "Hooch", a song on the Melvins' album Houdini (1993)
- "Hooch", a song from Sum 41's album Does This Look Infected?
- "The Hooch", a song from Travis Scott's album Birds in the Trap Sing McKnight

== Food and drinks ==
- Hooch, liquid produced during the making of sourdough starter
- Hooper's Hooch, a 1990s brand of alcopop (spirit cooler)
- Hoosh or Hooch, a stew made from water, biscuits, and pemmican
- Hooch, a colloquial term for an alcoholic distilled beverage
- Prison hooch, sometimes called pruno, an alcoholic beverage made covertly from various ingredients available in prison
- Moonshine, illicit distilled spirits

== Other uses ==
- Hooch or hootch, Korean War and Vietnam War slang for a thatched hut or improvised living space (e.g., inside a sand-bagged bunker or improved "foxhole")
- Hootch, military slang for tarpaulin
