= Portrait of Herman Doomer =

1640 painting by Rembrandt

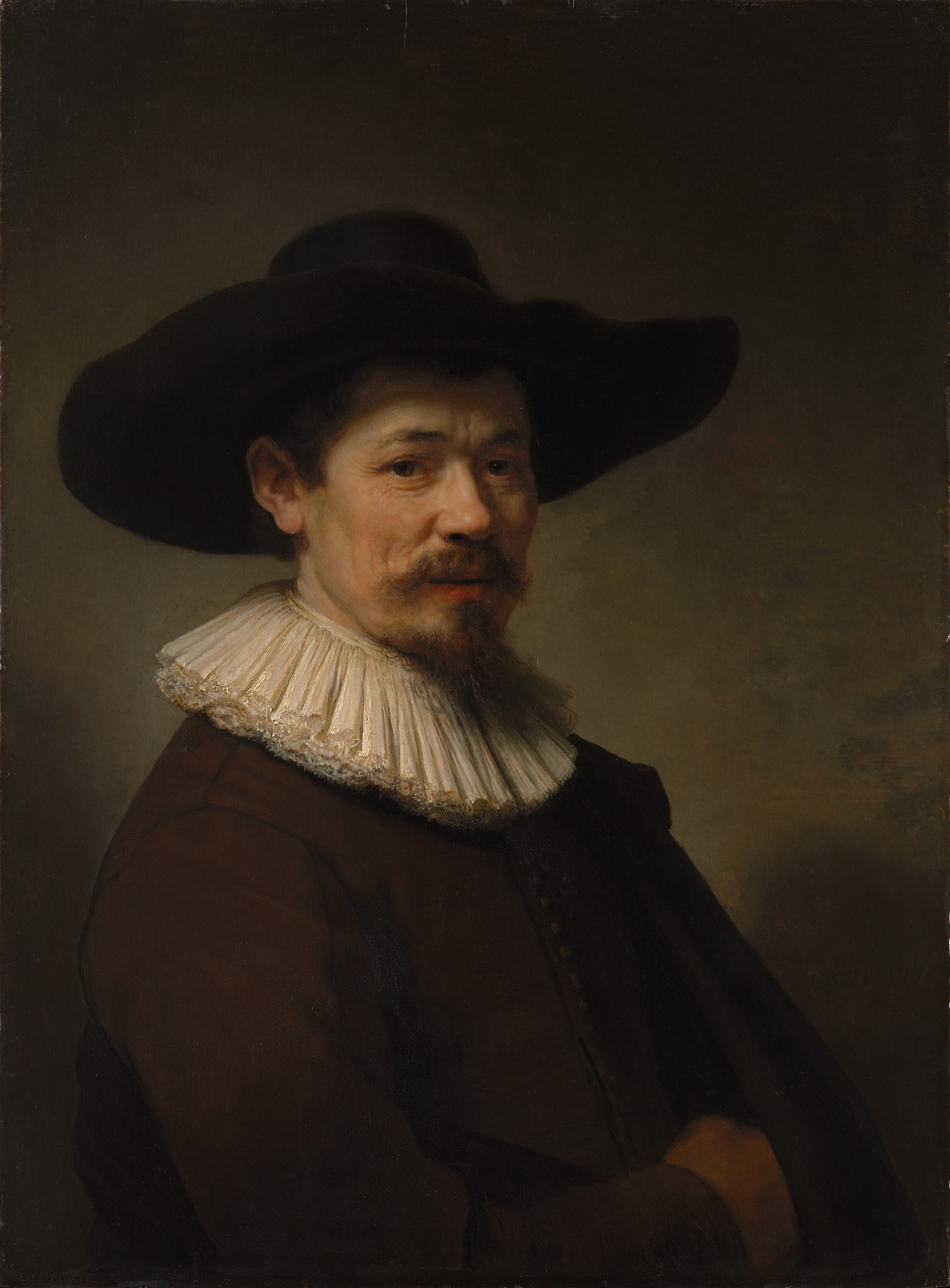
- Artist: Rembrandt
- Year: 1640
- Medium: Oil on wood
- Dimensions: 75.2 cm × 55.2 cm (29.6 in × 21.7 in)
- Location: Metropolitan Museum of Art; New York City
- Accession: 29.100.1

Portrait of Herman Doomer is a 1640 oil on oak panel portrait of an Amsterdam businessman by Rembrandt, now in the Metropolitan Museum of Art, to which it was left in 1929 by Louisine Havemeyer.

The subject, Herman Doomer, was a successful cabinetmaker and worker in ebony, which was fashionable in seventeenth-century Amsterdam. Rembrandt also painted a companion piece of his wife around the same time, the Portrait of Baertje Martens, which is in the collection of the State Hermitage Museum, St. Petersburg, Russia. The two pictures were left by Baertje Martens in her will in 1654 to their son, Lambert Doomer, an artist himself, on condition that he made copies of the two pieces for each of his brothers and sisters.

The work is on view at the Metropolitan Museum in Gallery 964.

== Sources ==
- http://www.rembrandtdatabase.org/Rembrandt/painting/32162/portrait-of-herman-doomer
