= Roelant =

Roelant is a Dutch male given name. Notable people with the name include:

- Roelant Oltmans (born 1954), Dutch field hockey coach
- Roelant Roghman (1627–1692), Dutch painter, sketcher and engraver
- Roelant Savery (1576–1639), Dutch painter
