= Savery =

Savery is a surname. Notable people with the surname include:

- Constance Savery (1897-1999), English author
- George Mearns Savery (1850–1905), English educator, founder of Harrogate Ladies' College, and one of the pioneers of women's education
- Gil Savery (1917-2018), American journalist
- Henry Savery (1791–1842), Australian novelist
- Jan Savery (1589–1654), Flemish painter
- Joe Savery (born 1985), baseball pitcher
- Nigel Savery (21st century), geneticist
- Roelant Savery (1576–1639), Flanders-born Dutch baroque painter
- Thomas Savery (circa 1650–1715), English inventor
- Uffe Savery (born 1966), Danish percussionist

== See also ==
- Savery Hotel, listed on the National Register of Historic Places in Des Moines, Iowa, United States
- Savery Pond (Plymouth, Massachusetts), United States
- Savory (disambiguation)
- Savery, Wyoming, United States
