= De Hooch =

De Hooch was the surname of a number of Dutch Golden Age painters of unknown relationship. Their names are frequently spelled De Hoogh as well, and the modern spelling of their name would be De Hoog. Pieter de Hooch is by far the best known amongst them.

- Charles Cornelisz. de Hooch (c. 1600–1638), Dutch landscape painter
- David de Hooch (fl. 1639–1655), Dutch Italianate landscape painter, possibly a son of Charles
- Dirck Cornelis de Hooch (1613–1651), Dutch portrait painter
- Gerrit de Hooch (died c.1679), Dutch painter of Italianate landscapes, either a son or nephew of Dirck
- Horatius de Hooch (fl. 1652–1686), Dutch Italianate landscape painter
- Pieter de Hooch (1629–aft.1684), Dutch genre painter

== See also ==
- Hooch (surname)
- De Hoog
