= Saver =

Saver or savers may refer to:

- Saver (manhwa), a Korean manhwa by Eun-Young Lee
- The Saver, 2015 Canadian drama film, written and directed by Wiebke von Carolsfeld
- Saver return, a type of train ticket in the United Kingdom
- Kaman KSA-100 SAVER (Stowable Aircrew Vehicle Escape Rotorseat), a gyroplane
- Savers, a U.S. thrift store chain
- Savers (UK retailer), a U.K. discount store chain
- Cheongju KB Savers, a South Korean women's basketball team

== See also ==
- Captain Saver, a 1992 Taito videogame
- Savères, a commune in Haute-Garonne department, France
- Savior (disambiguation)
- Savor (disambiguation)
- SAVR (disambiguation)
- Save (disambiguation)
