= Jacob Savery =

Flemish painter

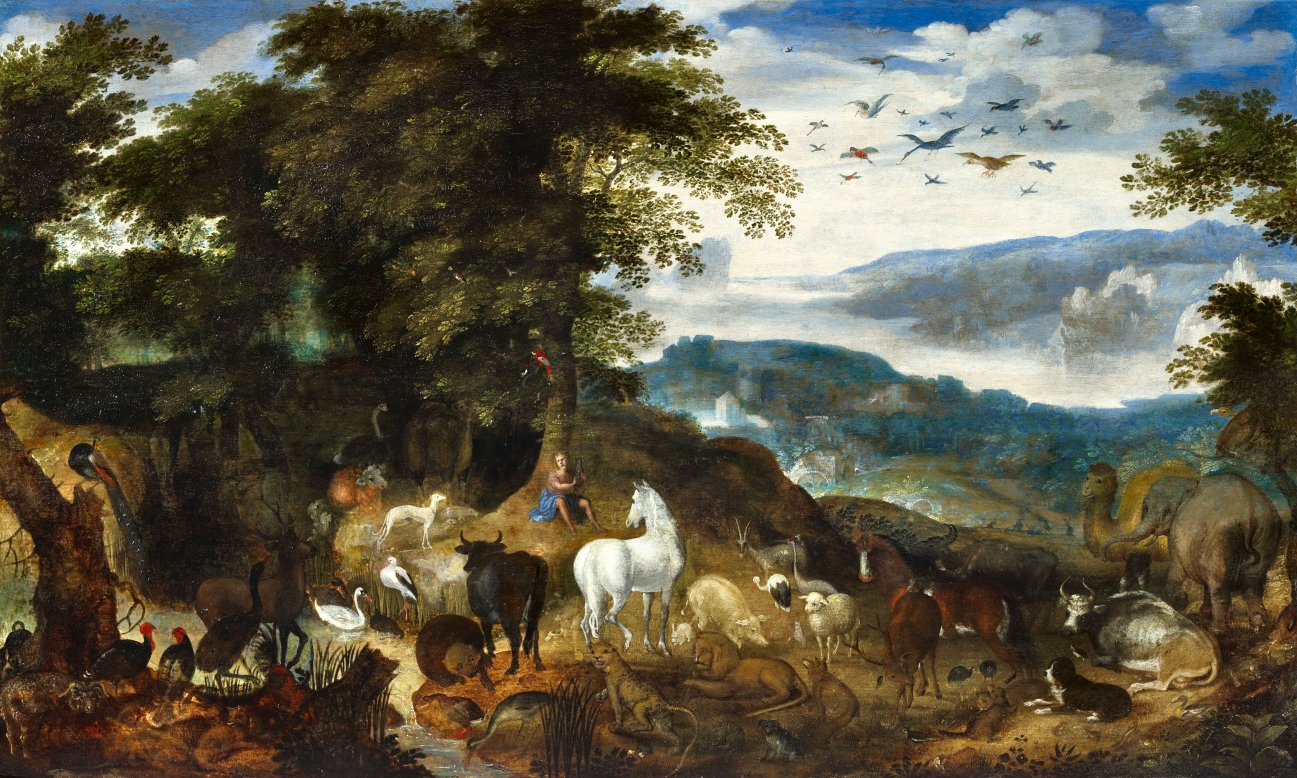
- Orpheus Charming the Animals and Trees
- Born: 1566; Kortrijk, County of Flanders, Habsburg Netherlands
- Died: 1603 (aged 36–37); Amsterdam, Holland, The Netherlands
- Known for: Landscape painting and drawing
- Children: 3 sons and 1 daughter

Jacob Savery or Jacob Savery the Elder (1566 – buried 23 April 1603) was a Flemish painter, etcher and draughtsman. He was trained in Antwerp and later moved to the Dutch Republic after 1584. He specialised in still lifes, animals, landscapes en genre paintings.

== Life ==
Jacob was born in Kortrijk into a family of painters. His father was Maerten Savery. Jacob probably apprenticed with the Flemish Mannerist painter Hans Bol as was reported by the early biographer Karel van Mander. As Anabaptists, the Savery family was forced to leave their native Flanders for fear of Spanish persecution c. 1580. The Savery family first stayed in Antwerp which had a Calvinist government. Savery was mentioned as the best student of the landscape painter Hans Bol. This must have been in Antwerp in the period from 1580 to 1583.

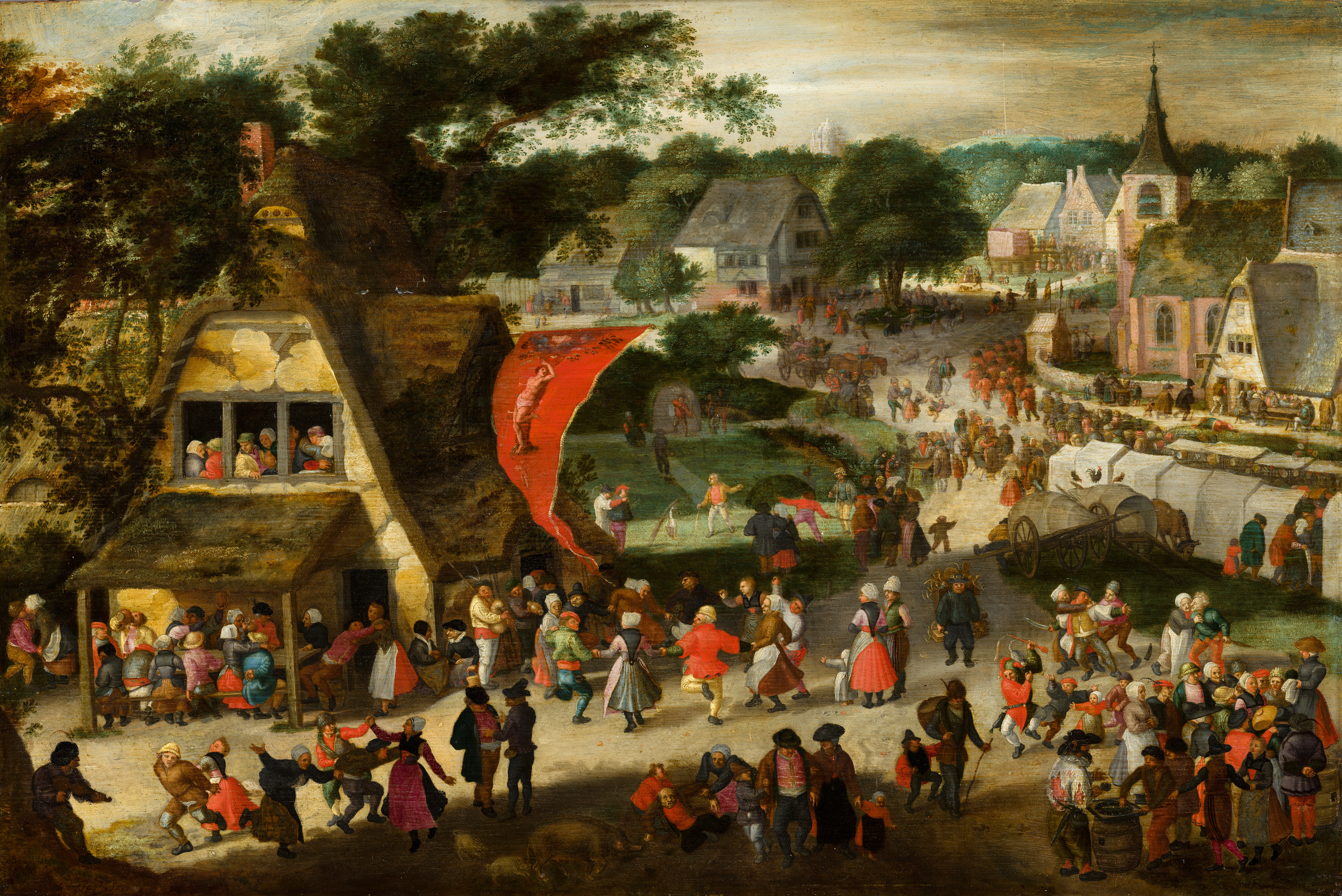
Fair on St Sebastian's Day

Jacob Savery settled around 1584 in Haarlem. Here he married Trijntgen Kokelen on 22 March 1587. The family moved to Amsterdam where in 1587, Jacob joined the Guild of St Luke. In 1591, Jacob became a citizen of Amsterdam.

He was the teacher of Joos Goeimare, his brother Roelant Savery (who became more famous because he was court painter at the imperial court in Prague), Frans Grebber (then a promising young painter and tapestry worker in Haarlem) and Willem van Nieulandt II. His three sons also became artists: Hans Savery II (1589–1654) was active in Amsterdam and Utrecht, where he assisted and imitated his uncle Roelant, Jacob Savery the Younger (1592–after 1651) was an animal painter and Salomon Savery (1594–1678) was a respected Amsterdam printmaker and publisher. Jacob Savery the Younger's son, Jacob Savery III (1617–66), became a printmaker and publisher. Jacob Saverys' daughter Maria was the mother of the painters Geertruydt Roghman, Roelant Roghman and Magdalena Roghman.

Savery died in Amsterdam where he was buried on 23 April 1603. The cause of death was reportedly the plague.

== Work ==
Jacob’s earliest known works of 1584–6 are mostly cabinet-size landscapes that clearly show the influence of his master Hans Bol.

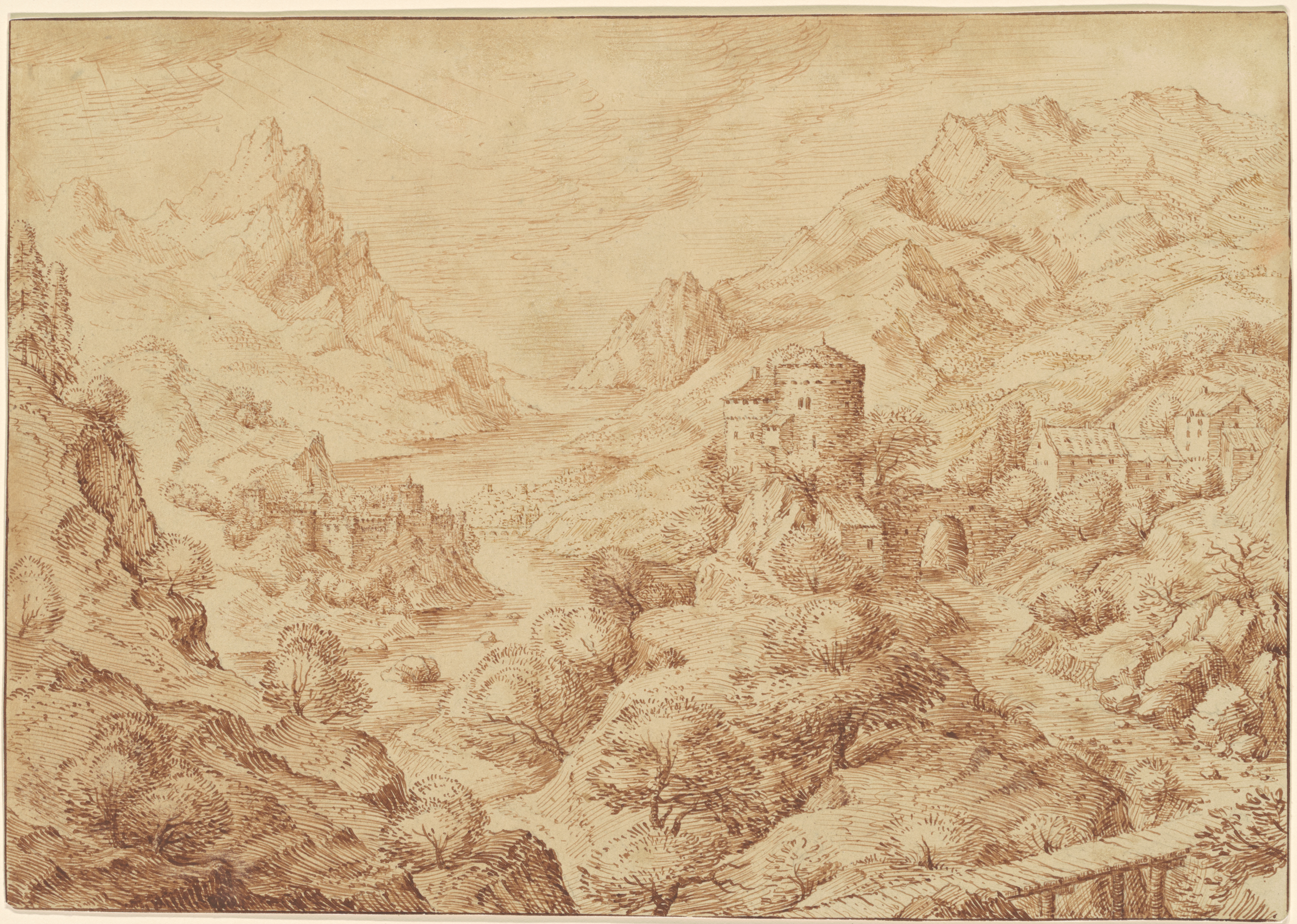
Panoramic river landscape, c. 1590

In Amsterdam Jacob was active as painter, etcher and draftsman. He produced a series of etchings in Pieter Bruegel the Elder's stipple technique depicting idealized rural scenes full of picturesque details, such as castle ruins and rabbit hunts. It is believed that Jacob also produced forgeries of Bruegel's pen-and-ink drawings of mountains and rural or Amsterdam subjects by adding false Bruegel signatures and dates between 1559 and 1562. These works have now been attributed to Jacob himself.

His genre paintings of low-life scenes are similar in style to Bruegel.

Savery also painted landscapes that were influenced by Gillis van Coninxloo who worked in Amsterdam from 1595. Despite contemporary references to his flower paintings, no examples have been identified.

Jacob’s animal paintings, with their abundance of creatures, adopt a near naturalistic approach. This new approach to animal painting likely played a role in his brother Roelant’s development of animal painting into an independent genre.
