= Savor =

Savor or Savour may refer to:

- Savoriness or umami, one of the five generally recognised basic tastes
- Savor, Hisense's white goods brand name
- Savor, a memoir by Pakistani-American chef Fatima Ali published posthumously in 2022
- "Savour", a song by Tim Smith from Tim Smith's Extra Special OceanLandWorld
- "Savour", a song by William D. Drake from Leader of the Starry Skies: A Tribute to Tim Smith, Songbook 1
- The former name of Savur, Turkey

== See also ==
- Saver (disambiguation)
- Savory (disambiguation)
