= Savory =

Savory or Savoury may refer to:

== Common usage ==
- Herbs of the genus Satureja, particularly:
  - Summer savory (Satureja hortensis), an annual herb, used to flavor food
  - Winter savory (Satureja montana), a perennial herb, also used to flavor food, but less common than summer savory
  - Savory of Crete (Satureja thymbra), an evergreen herb native to Eurasia, rarely used in seasoning food

== Food ==
- Savoury (dish), a small savoury dish, traditionally served towards the end of a formal meal in some European cuisine
- Savory (ice cream), a brand of ice cream from Nestlé
- Savoury pattie, a battered and deep fried disc of mashed potato, seasoned with sage
- Savoury pie, pies with savoury ingredients, as opposed to sweet pies
- Umami, also called savoriness, one of the basic tastes detected by the human tongue

== People ==
- Allan Savory (born 1935), Zimbabwean environmentalist, inventor of the Savory brittleness scale
- Borradaile Savory (1855–1906), English Anglican priest
- Brett Alexander Savory (born 1973), Canadian writer
- Charles Savory (1889–1915), New Zealand rugby league footballer
- Dennis Savory (born 1943), British archer and Olympian
- Douglas Savory (1878–1969), Northern Irish politician
- Gerald Savory (1909–1996), English playwright and screenwriter
- Graham Savory (born 1960), British discus thrower
- Heather Savory (born 1963), British statistician and open data advocate
- Henry Savory (1914–2008), English cricketer
- James Henry Savory (1855–1903), English clergyman, a Double Blue, cricketer, and footballer
- Joseph Savory (1843–1931), English politician
- Kemol Savory (born 1996), Guyanese cricketer
- Martha Savory Yeardley (1781–1851), English poet and Quaker minister
- Michael Savory (born 1943), English politician and Lord Mayor of London for 2004-05
- Nathaniel Savory (1794–1874), American colonist to the Bonin Islands
- Nirvana Savoury, Canadian musician and member of X-Quisite
- Reg Savory (1908–1989), New Zealand businessman and politician
- Reginald Savory (1894–1980), British Indian Army officer
- Roger Savory (1925–2022), British-born Canadian Iranologist and specialist on the Safavids
- Sim Savory (1946–2010), Canadian musician and member of Simani
- Teo Savory (1907–1989), American novelist, poet, and translator
- William Scovell Savory (1826–1895), British surgeon
- William Savory (1916–2004), audio engineer

== Other uses ==
- "Savory" (song), a 1994 single by the band Jawbox

== See also ==
- Savery, a surname
- Savor (disambiguation)
- Savory Creek, Western Australia
