= Dirck Cornelis de Hooch =

Dutch painter (1613–1651)

Dirk Cornelis de Hooch (1613–1651) was a 17th-century Dutch portrait painter, who lived and worked in The Hague (the Netherlands).

Born in 1613 at The Hague, he was a son of a Dutch bailiff, Cornelis de Hooch and his wife Jannetje Dirx van Doverschey. He was Gerrit de Hooch's uncle. He painted portraits and was a pupil of painter Pieter Quast. Dirk was a friend of Jan Jansz Buesem and Hans van Evelen (Ebeleyn), who both testified on his behalf in 1649. In 1645 he married Anna Heckselaer from Utrecht, widow of Pieter Hermensz Wolphes. Dirk Cornelisz murdered a fish seller called Stouthart in The Hague. Presumably for this reason, he fled to Königsberg (present-day Kaliningrad), but is mentioned again in The Hague in 1651 repeatedly harassing verbally a certain Magdaleentje Ariens Colijns.
