= Flowers with Two Lizards =

1603 painting by Roelant Saverij

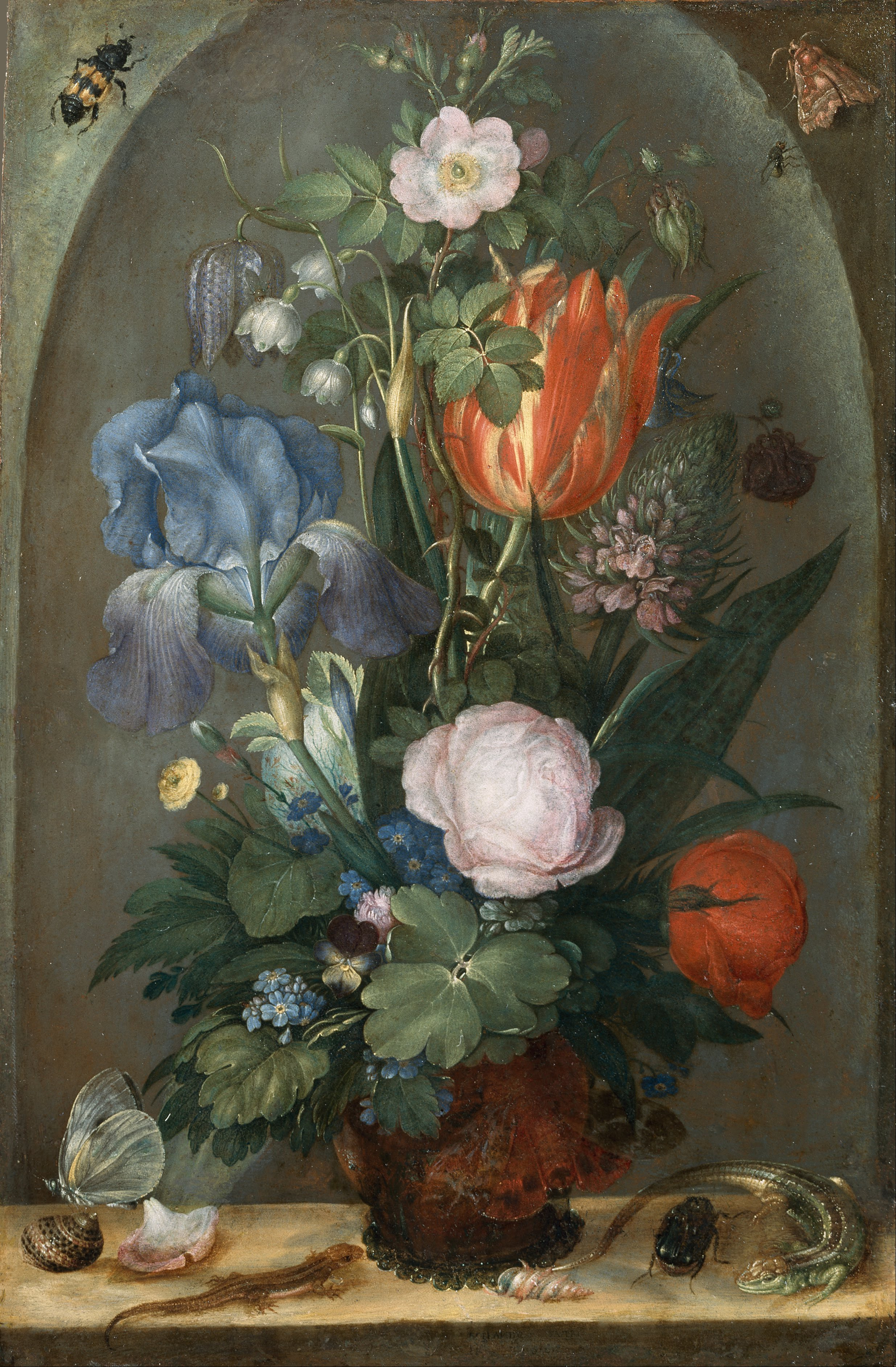
Flowers with Two Lizards (1603) by Roelant Savery

Flowers with Two Lizards is a 1603 painting by Roelant Savery, now in the Centraal Museum in Utrecht. It and a near-identical version by the same artist are the two earliest surviving floral still lifes from the Northern Netherlands.
