= De Hoog =

De Hoog (Dutch pronunciation: [də ˈɦoːx]) is a Dutch surname. Translating as "the high", the origin of the surname is most often toponymic, referring to a higher location, but could also be descriptive for an eminent person. People with this surname include:

- Bernard de Hoog (1867–1943), Dutch painter
- Dick de Hoog (1873–1939), Dutch politician, President of the Indo European Alliance
- Ellen Hoog (born 1986), Dutch field hockey player
- Henk de Hoog (1918–1973), Dutch racing cyclist
- Pieter de Hoogh (1629–1684), Dutch genre painter
- Robert de Hoog (born 1944), Dutch social scientist
- Robert de Hoog (born 1988), Dutch actor

== See also ==
- De Hooch, archaic spelling of the same name
