= Jan Savery =

Dutch painter

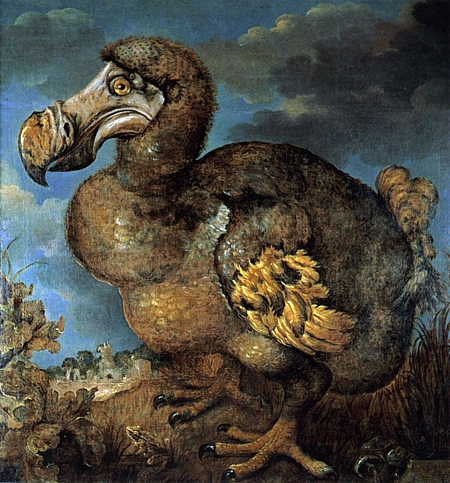
Dodo by Jan Savery (1651).

Jan or Hans Savery the Younger (1589, Haarlem – bur. 7 August 1654, Utrecht) was a Dutch Golden Age painter. Though more often referred to as Jan in connection with his best-known painting, he signed his works with Hans, both names being derivatives of Johannes.

== Biography ==
Savery was the son of Jacob Savery (ca 1565 - 1603) and nephew of Hans Savery the Elder (1564 - ca. 1623) and Roelant Savery (1576–1639), all three painters born in Kortrijk in the Spanish Netherlands who had moved north to the city of Haarlem between 1584 and 1586. He was likely a pupil of his uncle Roelant, whom he accompanied at the royal court in Prague before 1613, assisted in Utrecht from 1619 on and whose workshop he continued after 1639.

Hans Savery is best known for his 1651 depiction of the dodo now held by the Oxford University Museum of Natural History. It is widely believed that Lewis Carroll (who was also an Oxford mathematician) was inspired by Savery's image of the dodo hanging at Oxford to include the creature as a character in Alice's Adventures in Wonderland. His uncle Roelandt probably supplied the original works on which Jan Savery based his dodo painting.
