= Portrait of Baertje Martens =

1640 painting by Rembrandt

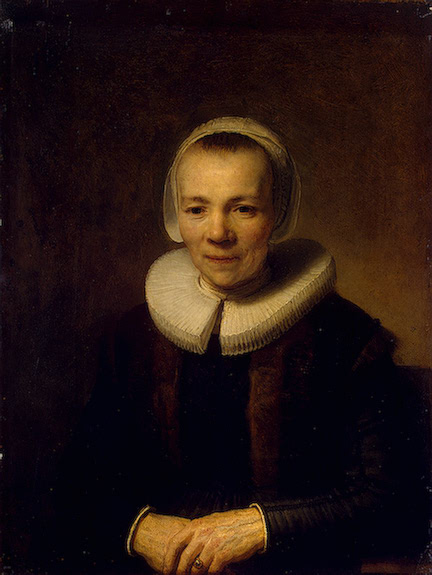

Portrait of Baertje Martens is a 1640 oil on oak panel portrait by Rembrandt, now in the Hermitage Museum after being acquired in Paris by Dmitri Alekseyevich Gallitzin for Catherine II of Russia. It is the pendent to the same artist's Portrait of Herman Doomer (Metropolitan Museum of Art).

== Sources ==
- Rembrandt Tentoonstelling. Ter herdenking van de geboorte van Rembrandt op 15 juli 1606, Rijksmuseum, Amsterdam, 18 mei-5 augustus 1956, Museum Boijmans Van Beuningen, Rotterdam, 8 augustus-21 oktober 1956, OCLC 15659340, cat.nr. 42.
