= Lambert Doomer =

Dutch painter

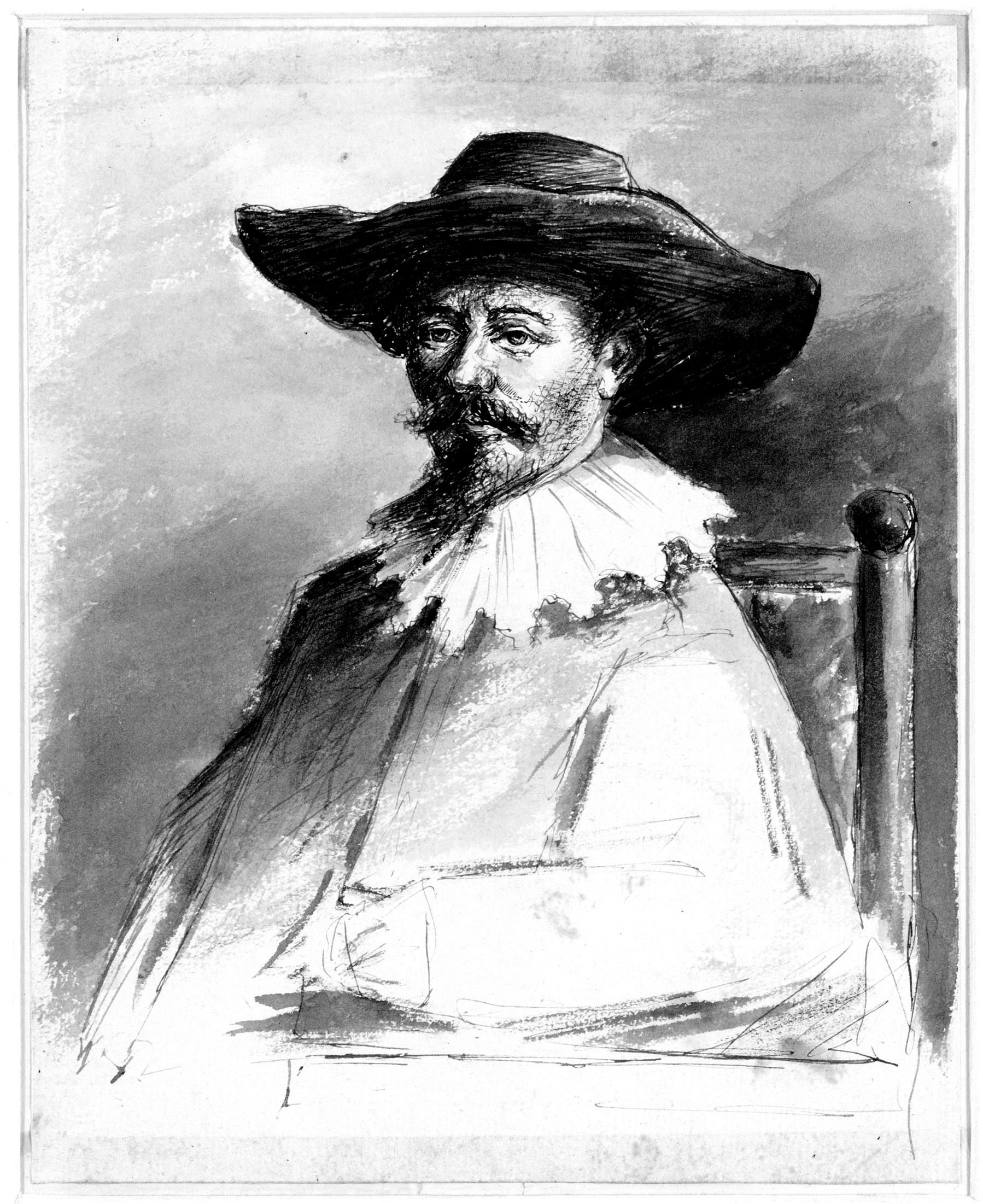
- Lambert Doomer (Ferdinand Bol)
- Born: Lambert Doomer; 11 February 1624; Amsterdam
- Died: 2 July 1700 (aged 76); Amsterdam
- Known for: Painting
- Movement: Baroque

Lambert Doomer (11 February 1624 – 2 July 1700) was a Dutch Golden Age landscape painter.

== Biography ==
Doomer was the third of nine children of Herman Doomer (1595–1650) and his wife Baertje Martens, who ran a successful business in ebony-veneer furniture. Lambert was trained as a furniture maker like his father, but seemed to enjoy drawing more than woodworking and he became an artist. It is not known who trained him, but since his father supplied frames for Rembrandt, he probably had access to a teacher within his father's network. (One of them was Pieter Quast.) Rembrandt painted portraits of his parents for their 25th wedding anniversary, which was unusual at the time, in 1638.

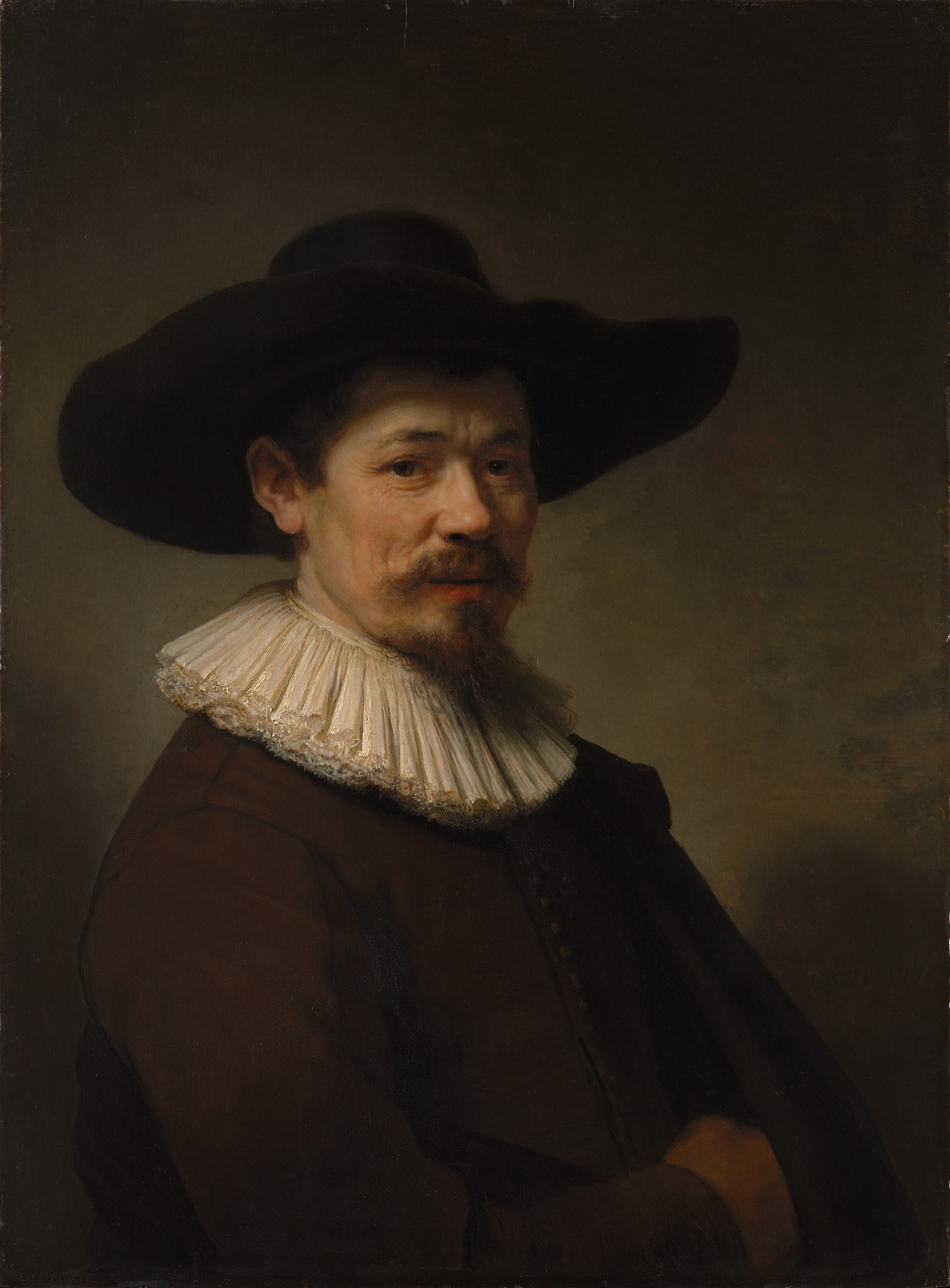
Herman Doomer, 1638, New York, Metropolitan Museum of Art.

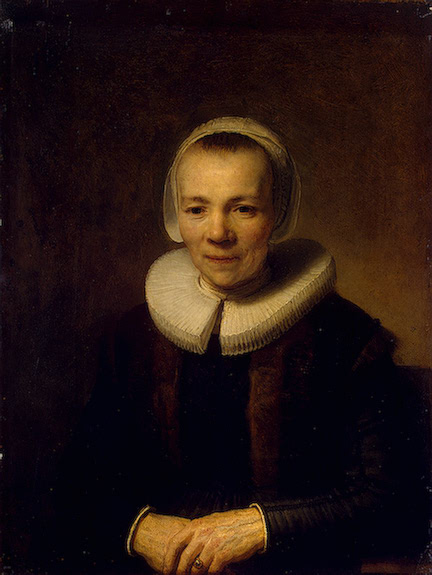
Baertje Martens, 1638, St.Petersburg, Hermitage.

Lambert Doomer painted copies of both of these paintings in 1644. To finish his education, Lambert traveled to France with Willem Schellinks who was three years younger than he was, in 1646. They both made extensive drawings of this trip and Schellinks drawings are kept in the Fondation Custodia in Paris, the foundation started by Frits Lugt. Their destination was Nantes, where two of Doomer's brothers lived, but they argued and split up. They then embarked on a trip to England, and though both were on the same ship, they are not mentioned in each other's journals.

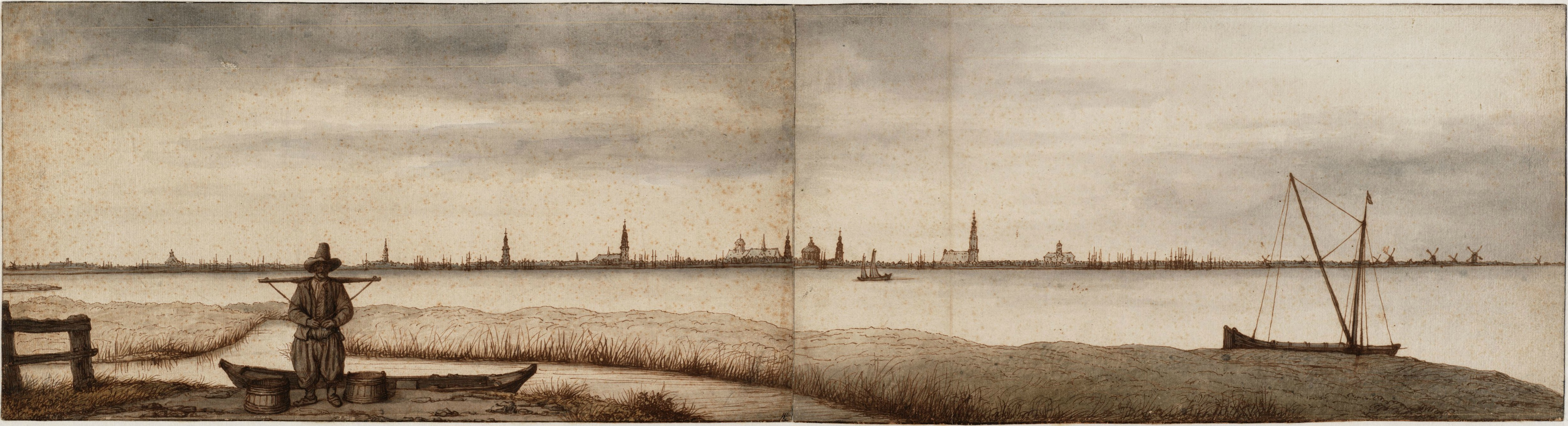
View of Amsterdam from across the IJ by Lambert Doomer

Doomer seems to have done well as a painter. He was able to buy at auction a large amount of Rembrandt drawings and sketchbooks after that artist's bankruptcy in 1657. It is from his meticulous copies of these drawings that others concluded that he was a Rembrandt pupil, but that is not certain. In 1663 he made a trip down the Rhine all the way to Switzerland, and it wasn't until 1668, at the age of 44, that he married and settled in Alkmaar, where he made many drawings. At the end of his life he moved to Amsterdam in 1694, where he later died.
