= SAVR =

SAVR or Savr may refer to:

- surgical aortic valve replacement (SAVR)
- Alto Río Senguer Airport (ICAO airport code: SAVR), Alto Río Senguer, Chubut, Argentina
- Savr Shalburov, a Russian wrestler who competed against Kurban Shiraev

== See also ==
- Flavr Savr, a genetically modified tomato
