= Jan Jansz Buesem =

Dutch Golden Age painter

Jan Jansz. Buesem
- Born: 1599/1600; Amsterdam
- Died: 1649 or later

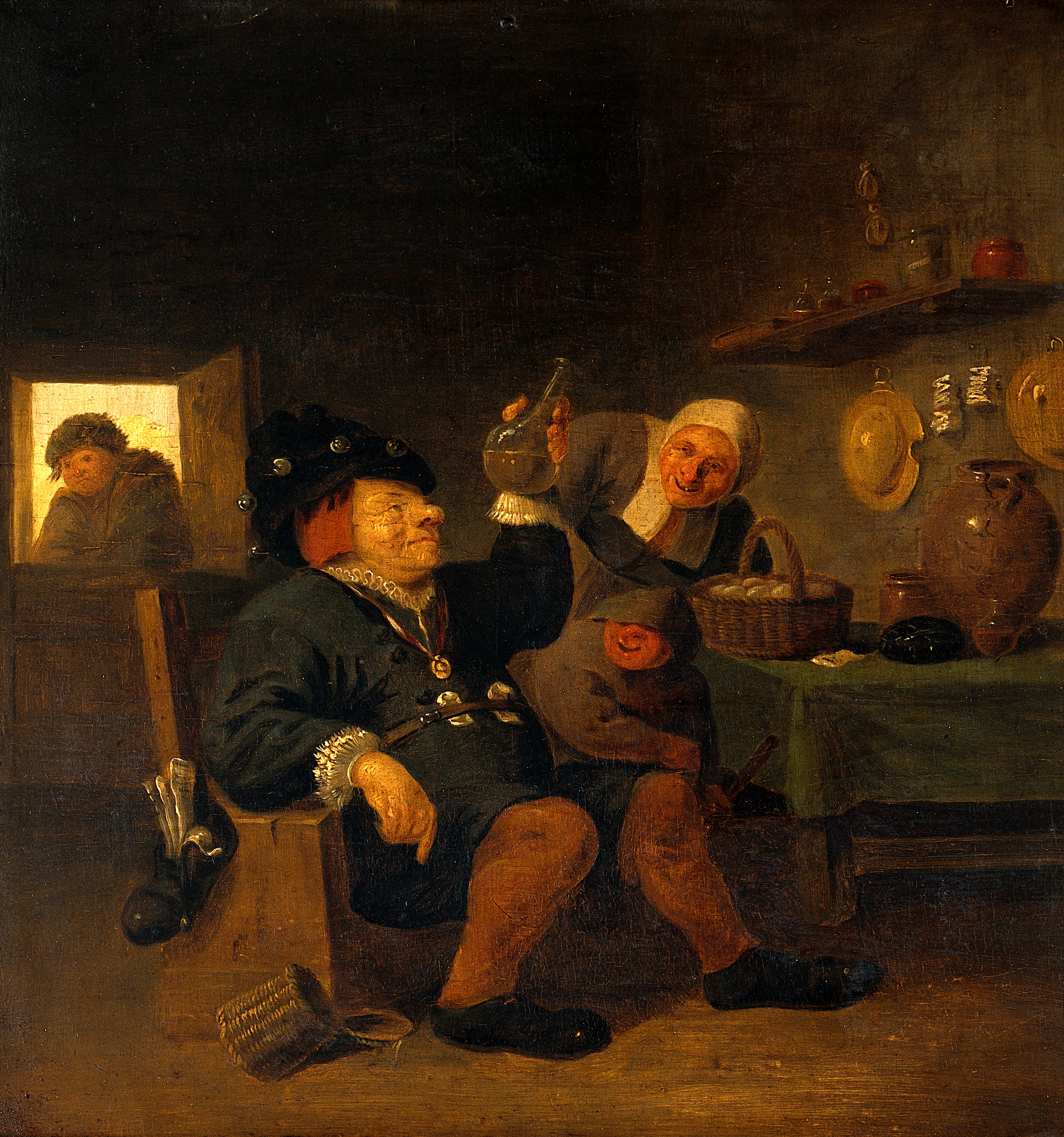
A physician examining a urine-flask

Jan Jansz. Buesem or Besem or Beusemen (1599/1600 – 1649) was a Dutch Golden Age painter.

He was a pupil of Pieter Jansz Quast around 1630. He is known for genre works, church interiors, and still life paintings.
