= Magdalena Roghman =

Dutch artist (1632–1679)

Magdalena Roghman (1632 – 1679) was a Dutch Golden Age engraver.

== Biography ==
She was born in Amsterdam as the younger sister of Geertruydt and Roelant Roghman. She married Jan Roelof Heister in 1669. She is known from two engravings in the book by Jan Bara called Herstelde vorst, ofte Geluckigh ongeluck, Amsterdam, 1650.

She died in Amsterdam.

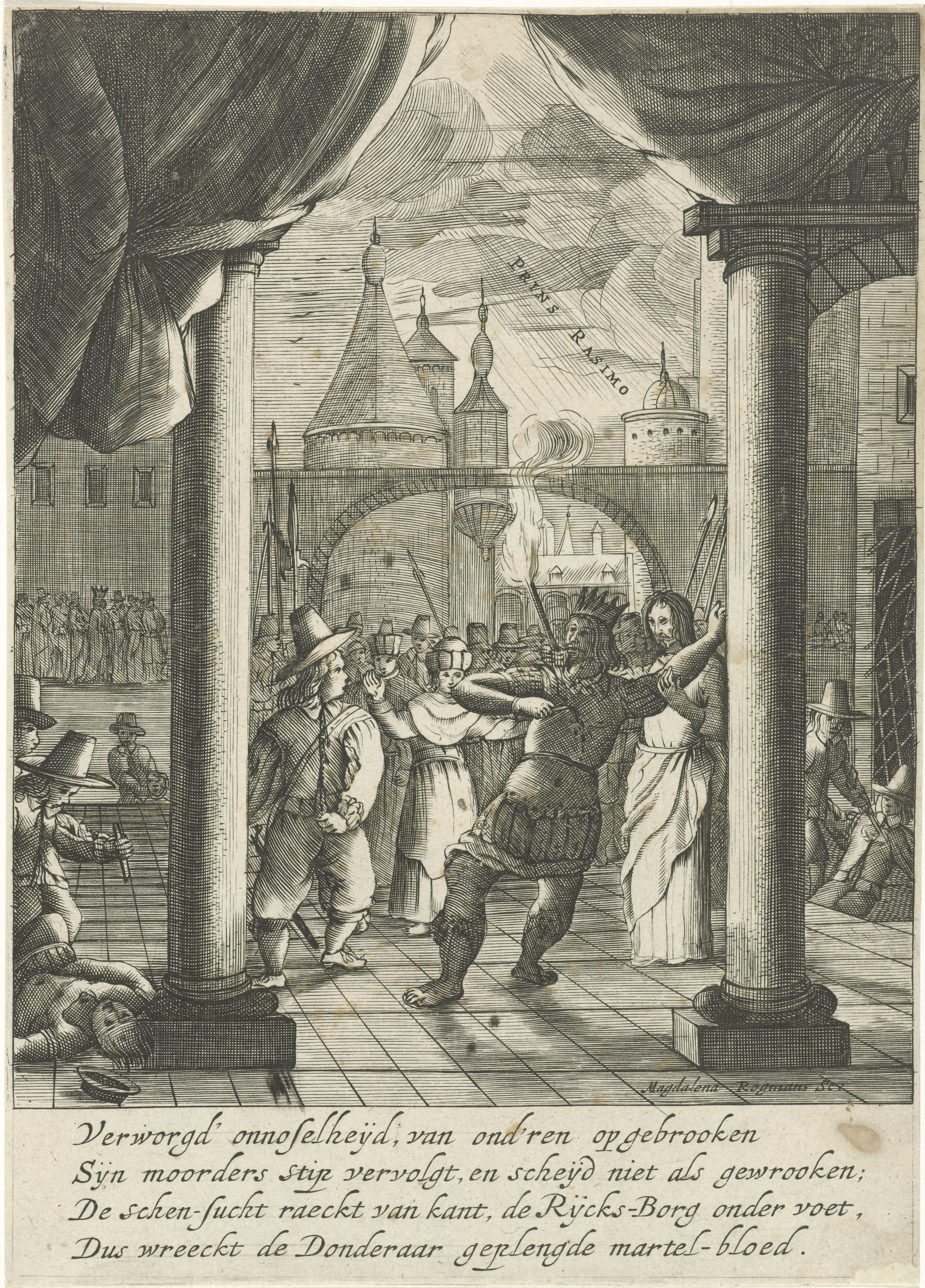
Magdalena Roghman, was a Dutch Golden Age engraver.
