= Herman Doomer =

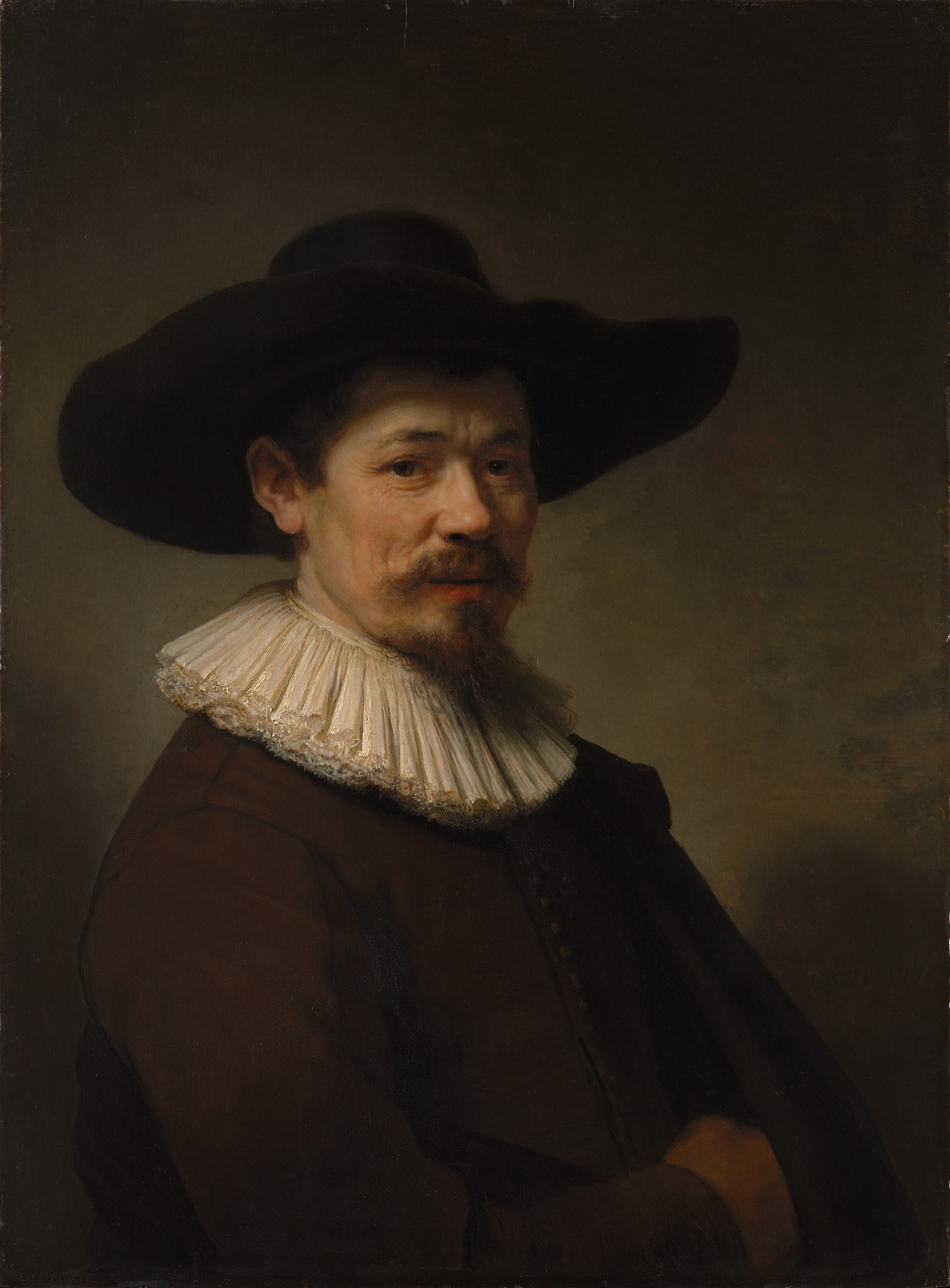
- Herman Doomer by Rembrandt (1640) in Metropolitan Museum of Art
- Born: 1595; Anrath
- Died: 1650 (aged 54–55); Amsterdam

Herman Doomer or Hermann Dommers (1595 – 14 March 1650) was a Dutch Golden Age furniture and frame-maker who is best known today for his portrait by Rembrandt.

== Life ==
He was born in Anrath, near Venlo, and married Baertje Martens from Naarden in 1618. He ran a successful business in ebony-veneer furniture and frames in the Kalverstraat, Gasthuismolensteeg and Hartenstraat. By 1625 Doomer already played a prominent role within the group of Amsterdam ebony workers. At times he collaborated with Pieter Quast and Johannes Lutma. From 1641 he used colored baleen.

He was very inventive in his use of material, for example, baleen or whalebone, which was pressed in a metal mould. He also used different types of tropical wood, which he decorated with images or fine marquetry of mother-of-pearl and ivory.

Doomer was buried at Nieuwezijds Kapel as his widow (1596-1678).

His son Lambert Doomer, a landscape painter, assisted the mother in the business. He inherited both portraits and made copies for his siblings.

== Pendant portrait ==
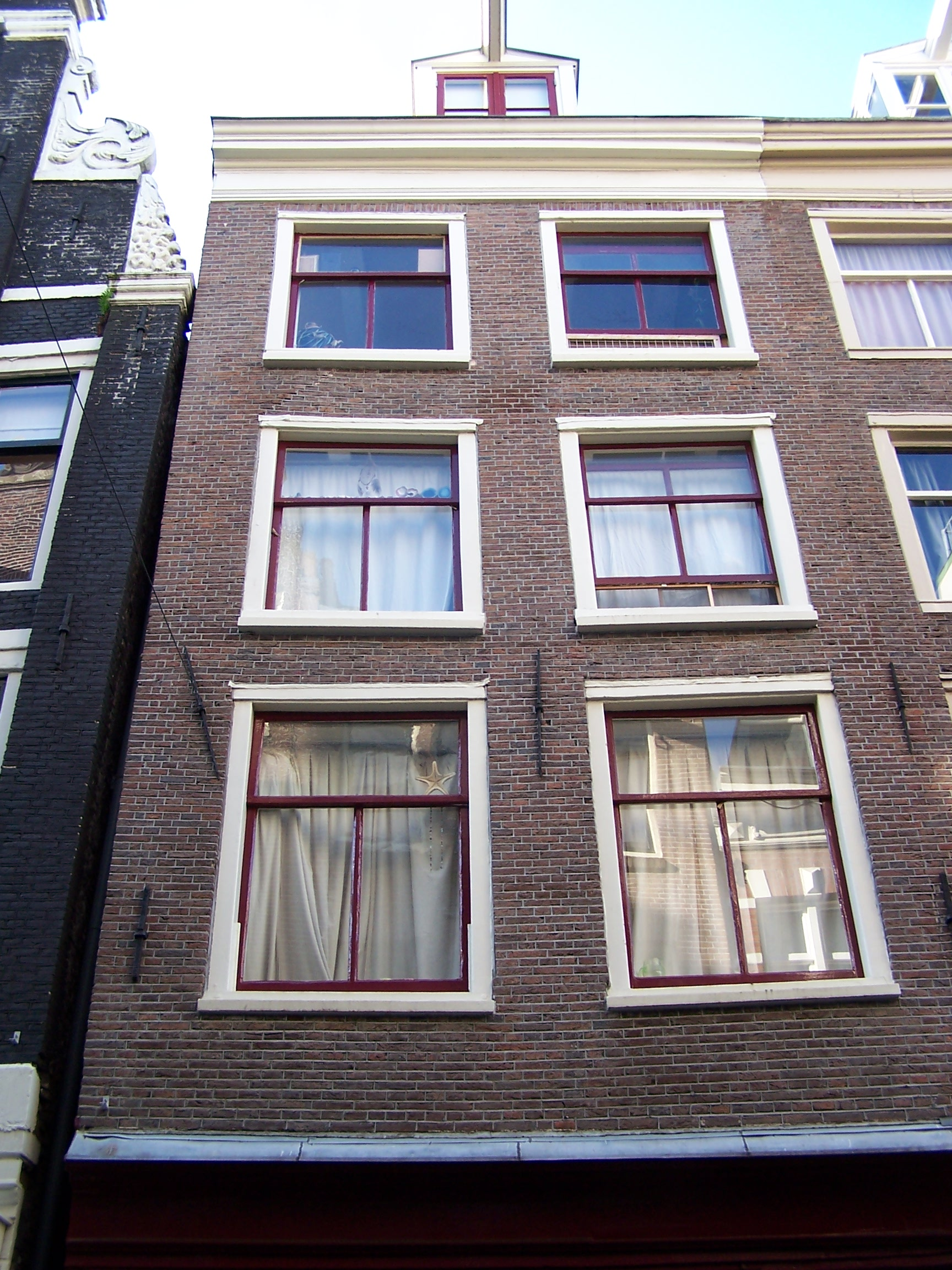
Gasthuismolensteeg 11 top

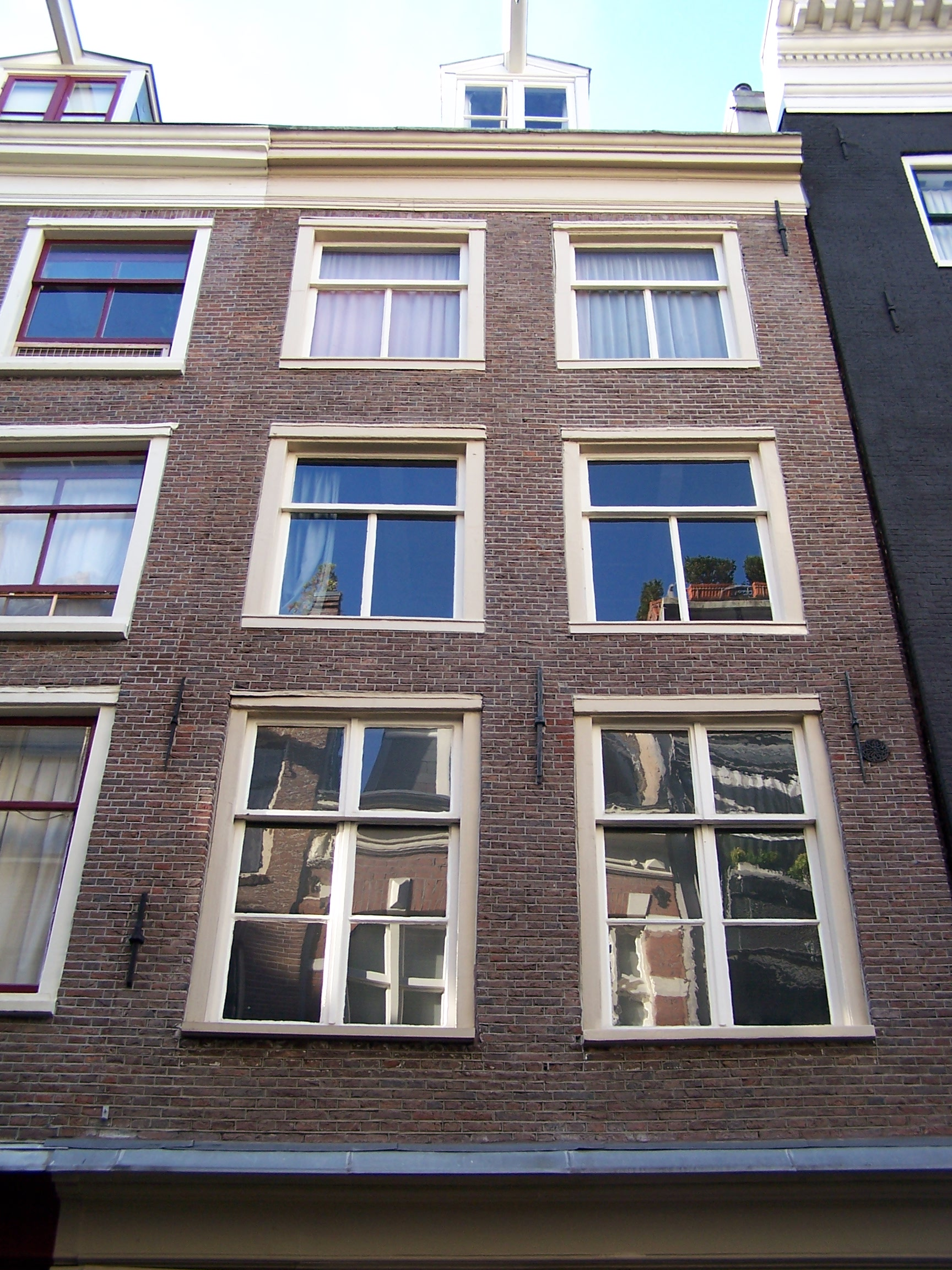
Gasthuismolensteeg 13 top

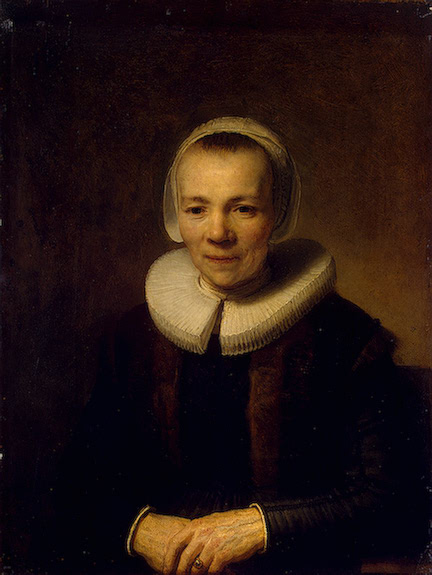
Portrait of Baertje Martens, St.Petersburg, Hermitage.

== Furniture ==
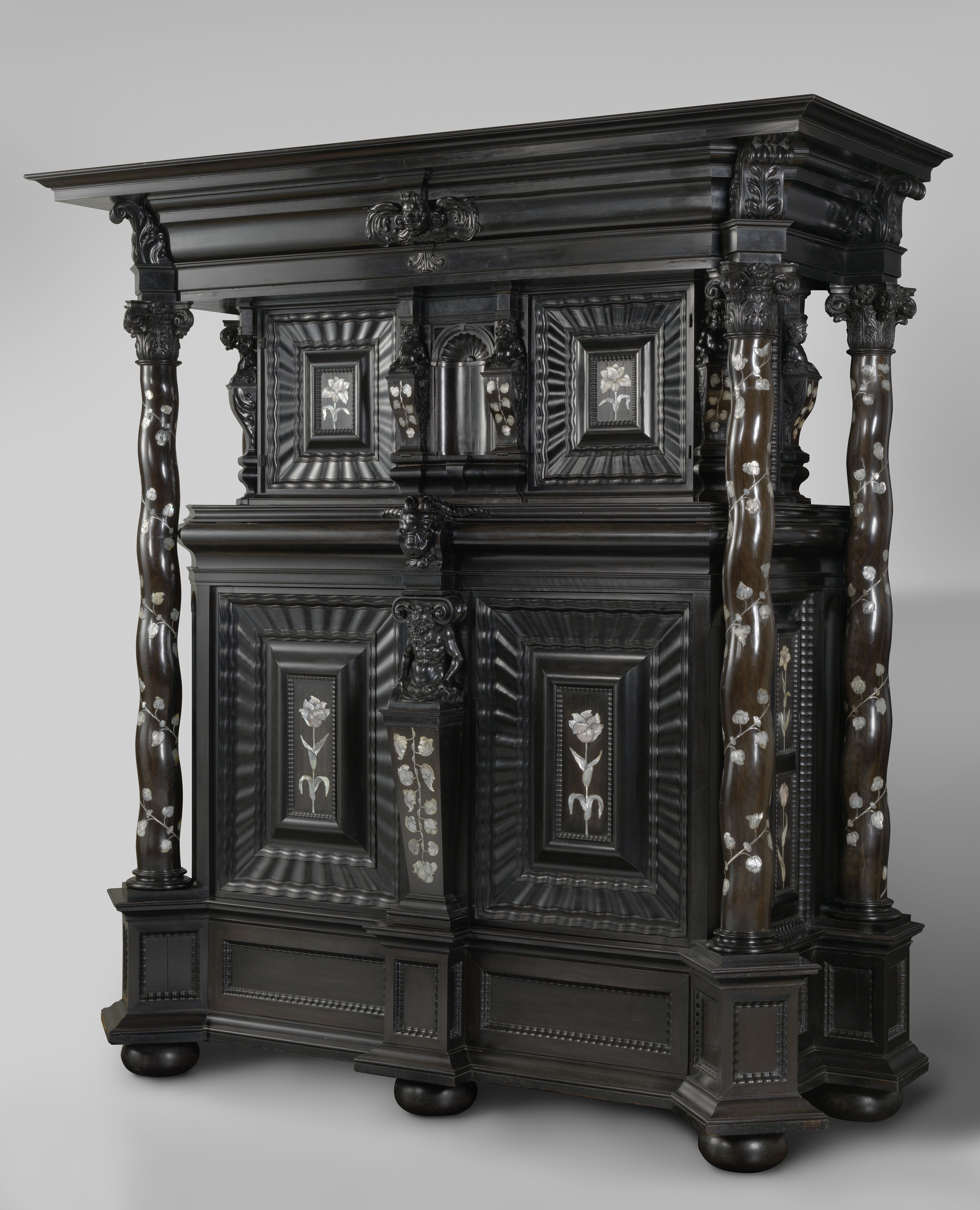
An engraved mother-of-pearl inlaid ebony cabinet by Herman Doomer, collection Rijksmuseum, Amsterdam, object number BK-1975-81.

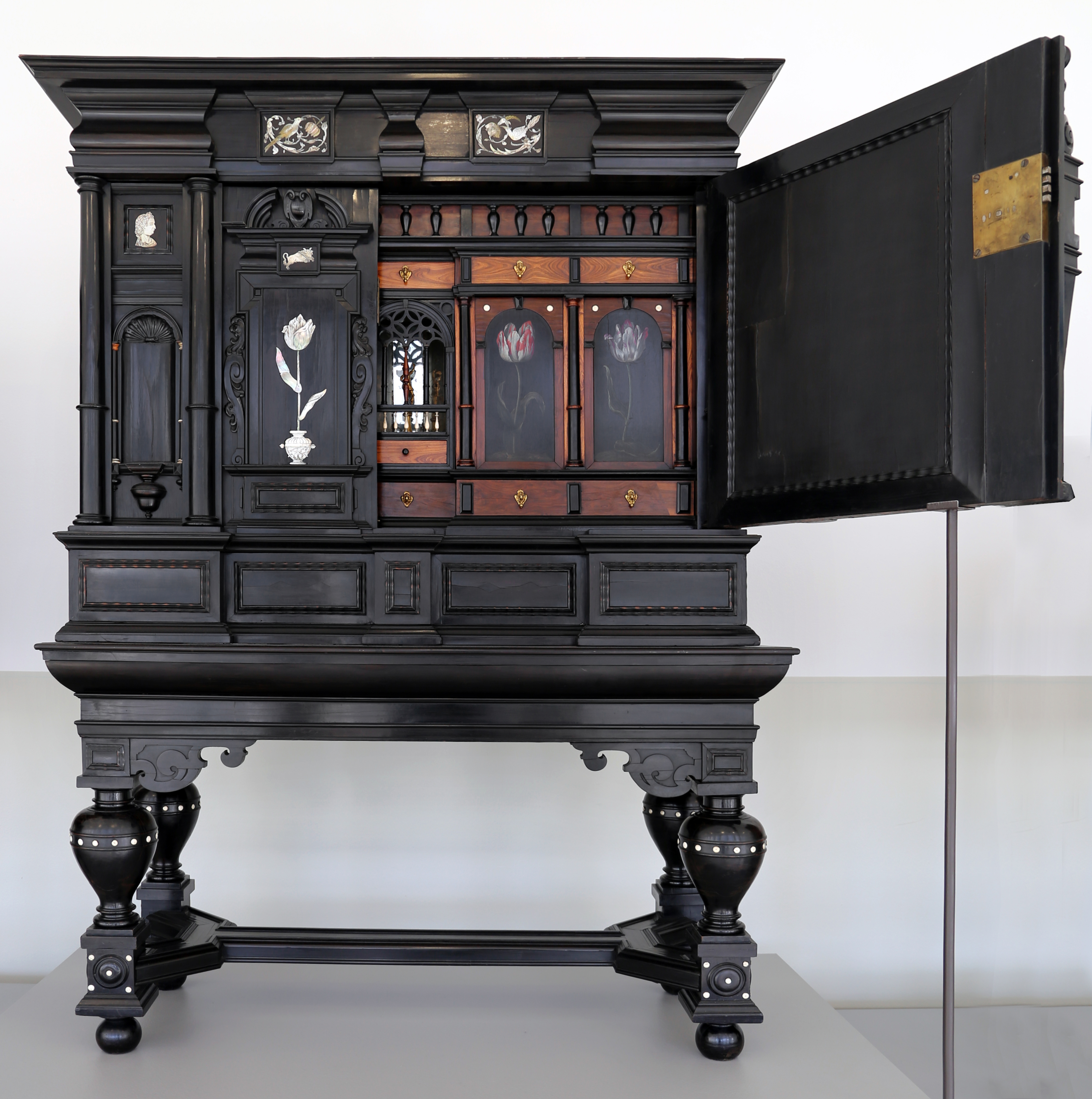
A tulip-themed ebony cabinet by Herman Doomer, collection Boijmans Van Beuningen Museum, Rotterdam

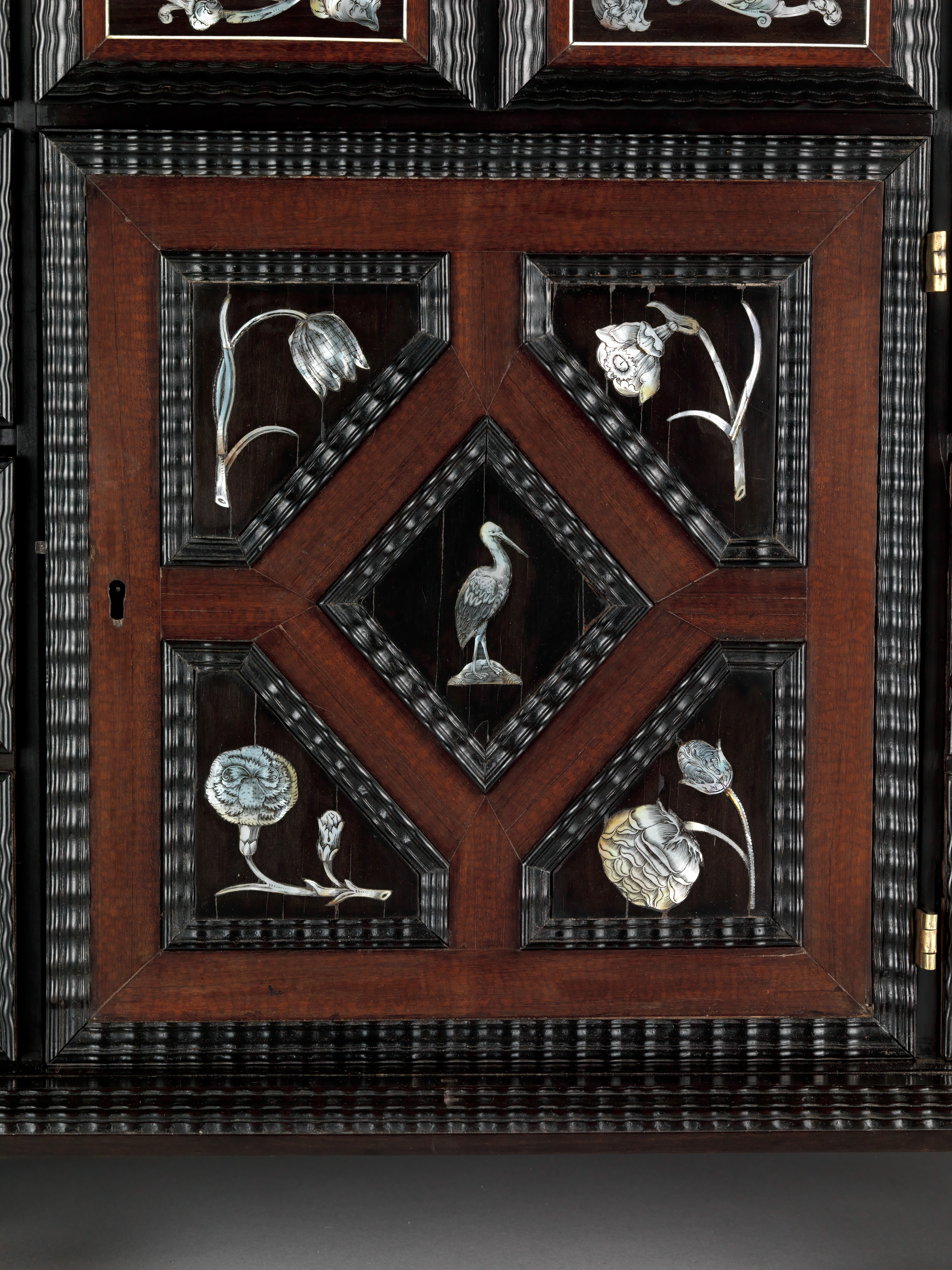
Detail of an engraved mother-of-pearl inlaid table cabinet attributed to Herman Doomer in The Metropolitan, New York, accession number 2011.181.

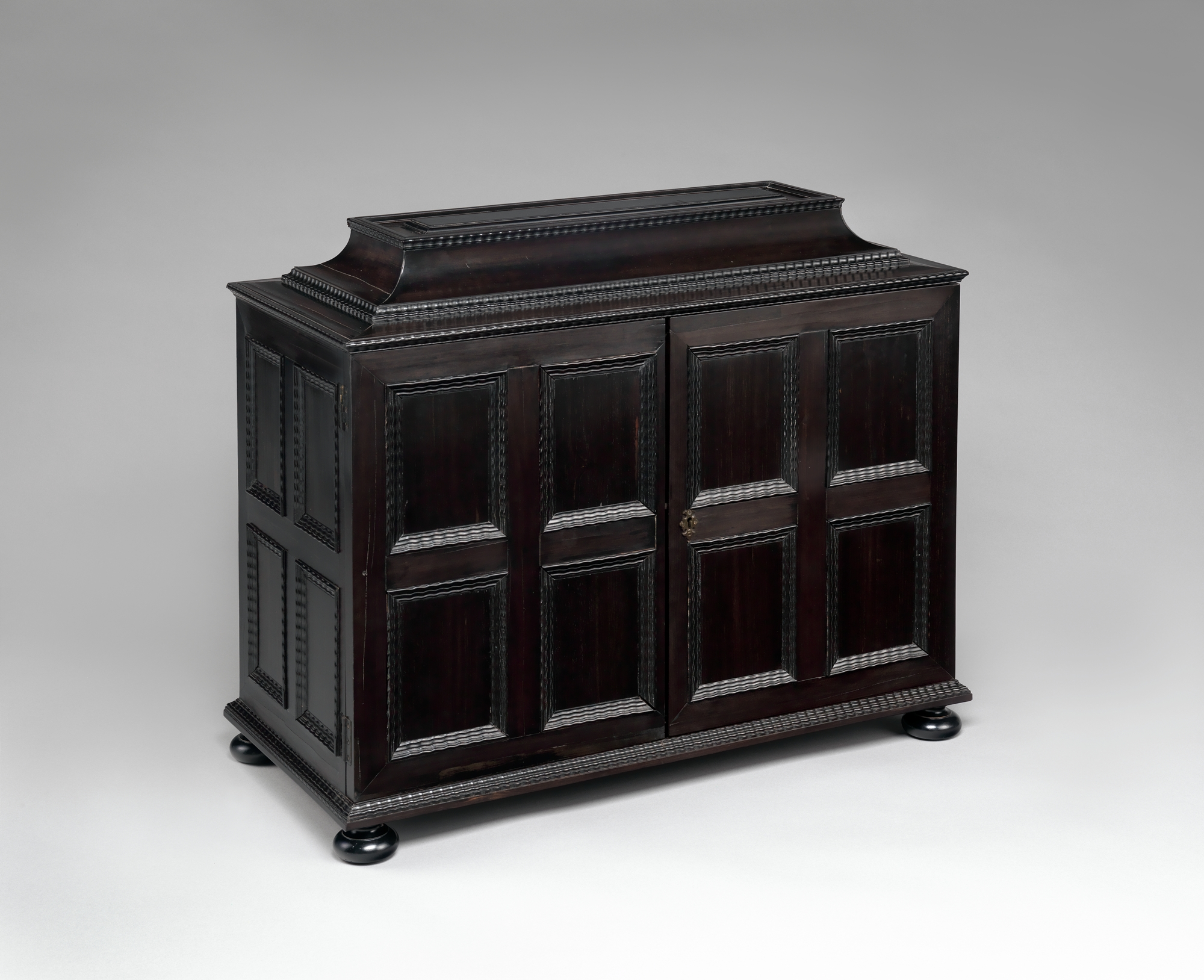
An engraved mother-of-pearl inlaid table cabinet attributed to Herman Doomer in The Metropolitan, New York, accession number 2011.181.

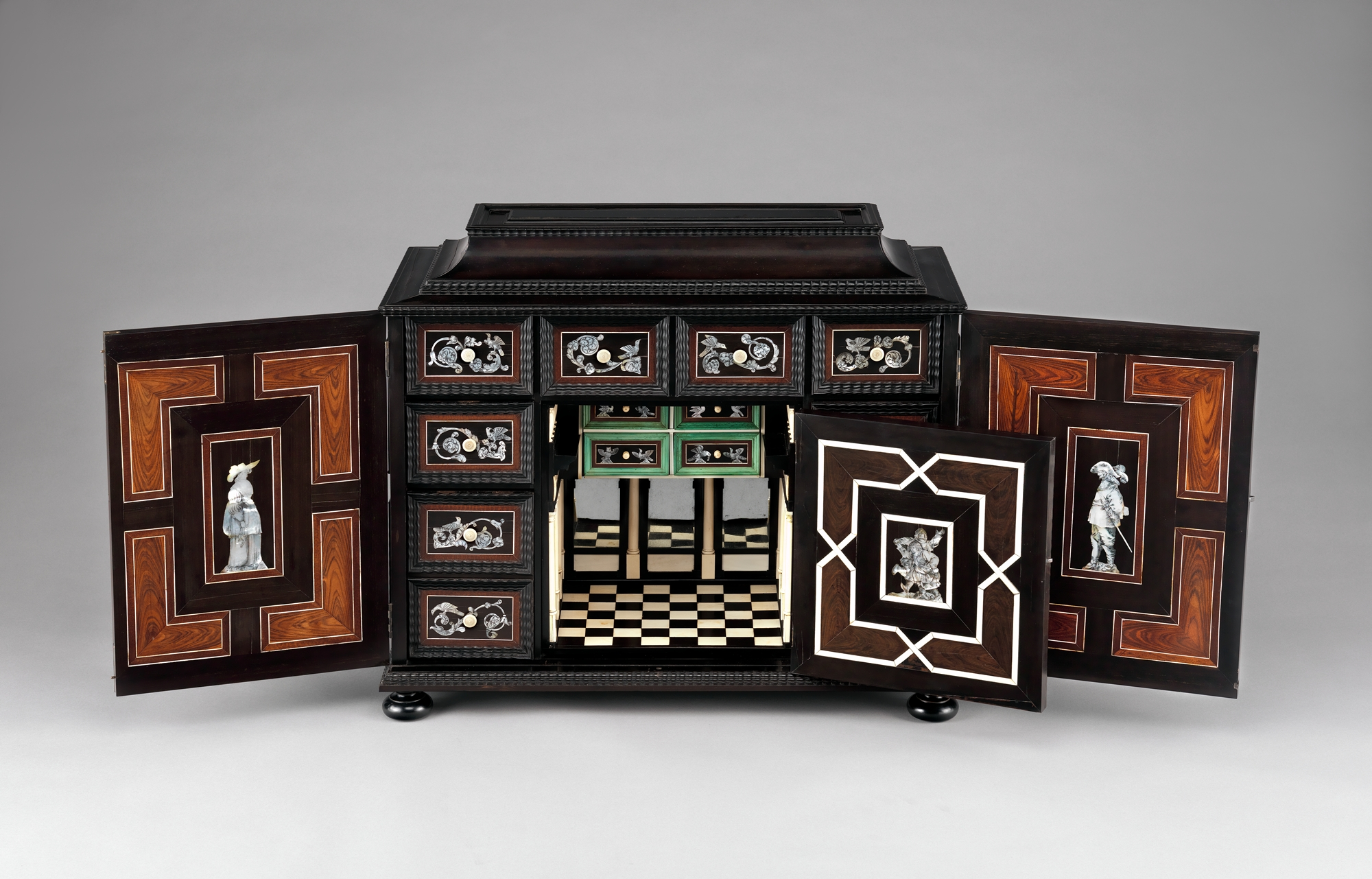
An engraved mother-of-pearl inlaid table cabinet attributed to Herman Doomer in The Metropolitan, New York, accession number 2011.181.

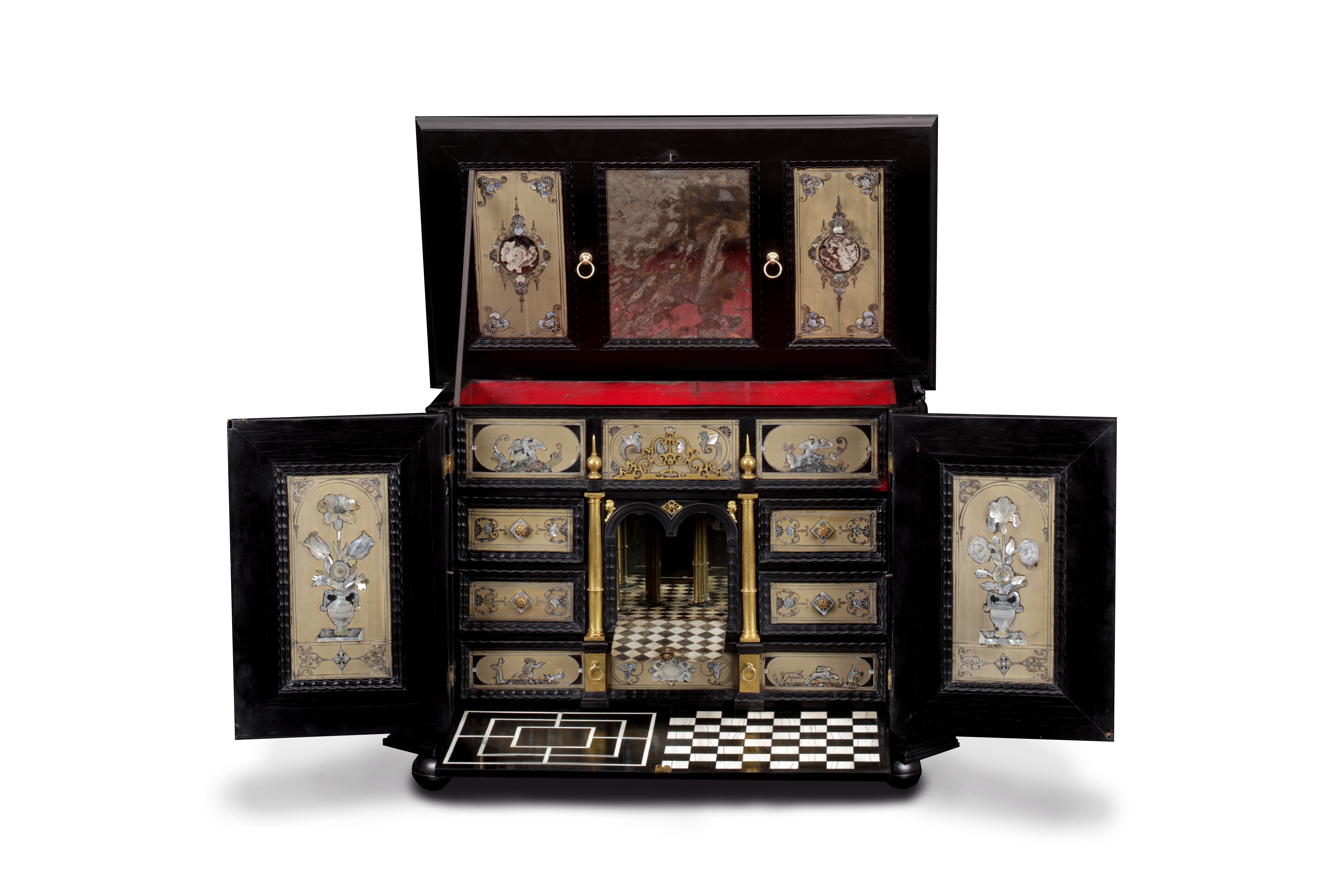
An engraved mother-of-pearl inlaid baleen and ebony table cabinet attributed or by Herman Doomer, vetted as such and sold by Dutch dealer Zebregs&Röell at Tefaf Maastricht, 2023.

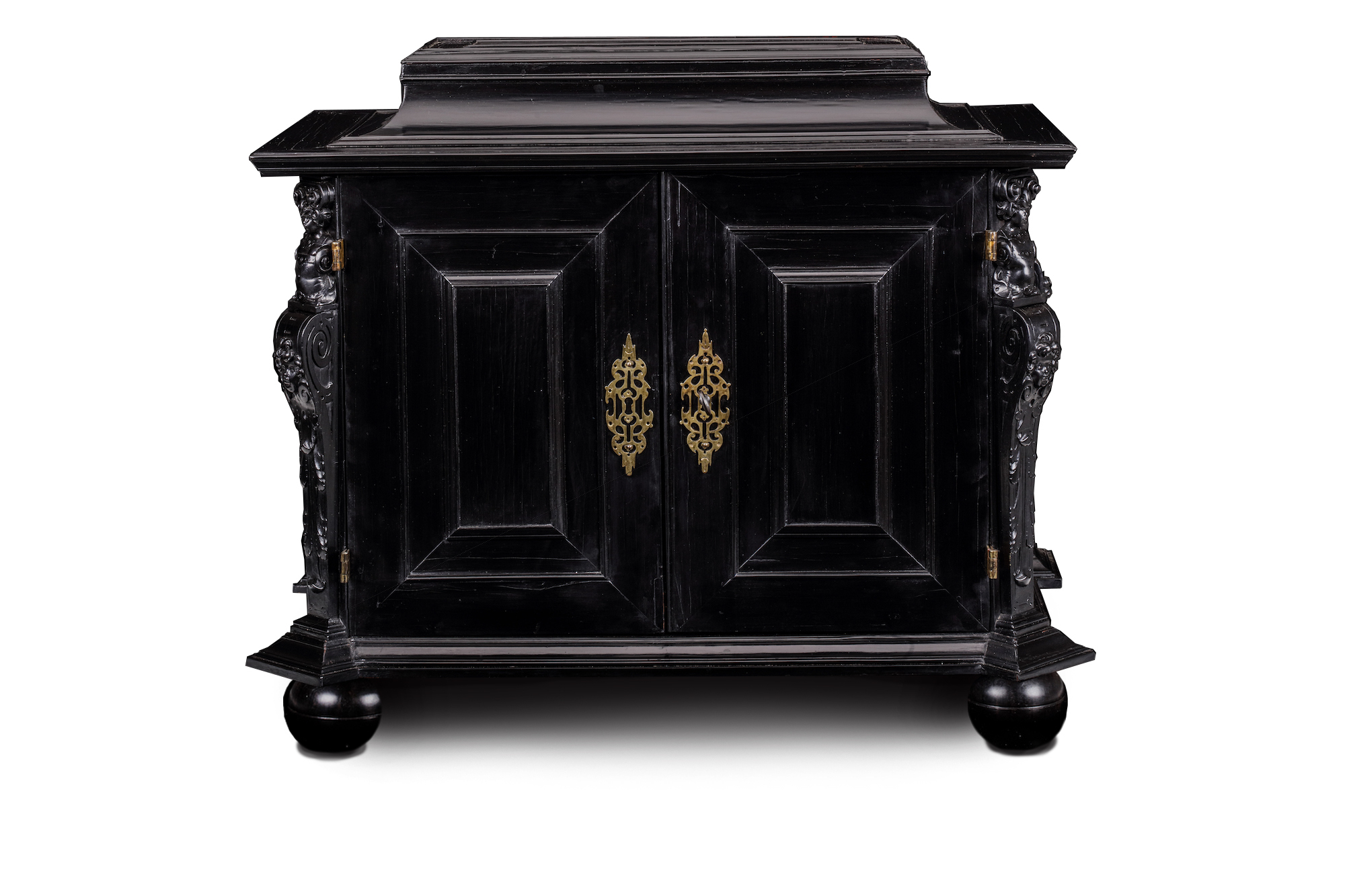
An engraved mother-of-pearl inlaid baleen and ebony table cabinet attributed or by Herman Doomer, vetted as such and sold by Dutch dealer Zebregs&Röell at Tefaf Maastricht, 2023.

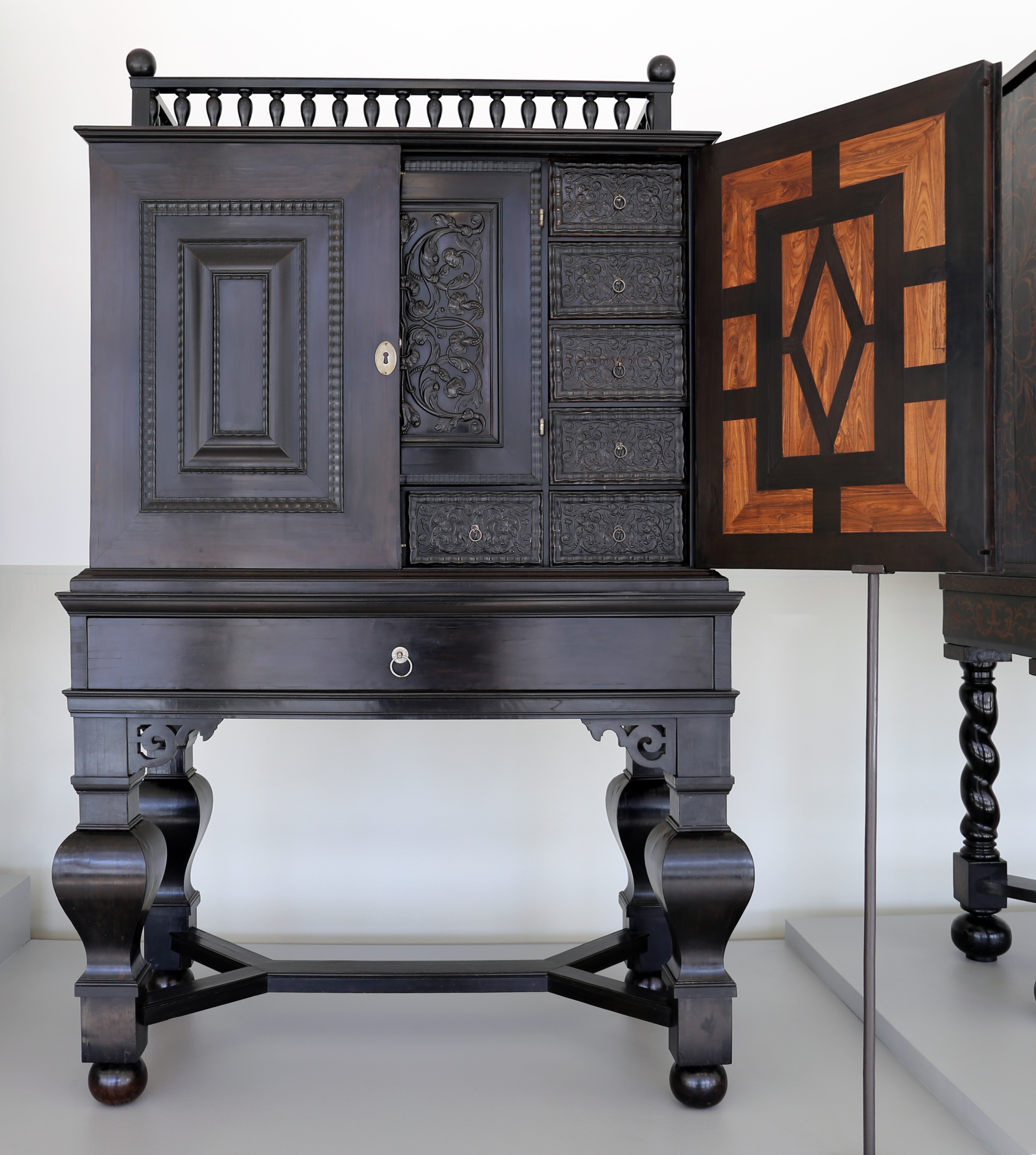
An ebony cabinet by Herman Doomer, collection Boijmans Van Beuningen Museum, Rotterdam.
