= Hooch (surname) =

Hooch, as a surname, may refer to the following fictional characters:

- Rolanda Hooch, a teacher at Hogwarts in the Harry Potter series by J.K. Rowling
- Dr. Hooch (Scrubs), a minor character from Scrubs
- DC Hooch, a character in Coronation Street

== See also ==
- De Hooch, a Dutch surname
