= Pieter Quast =

Dutch Golden Age painter and draughtsman

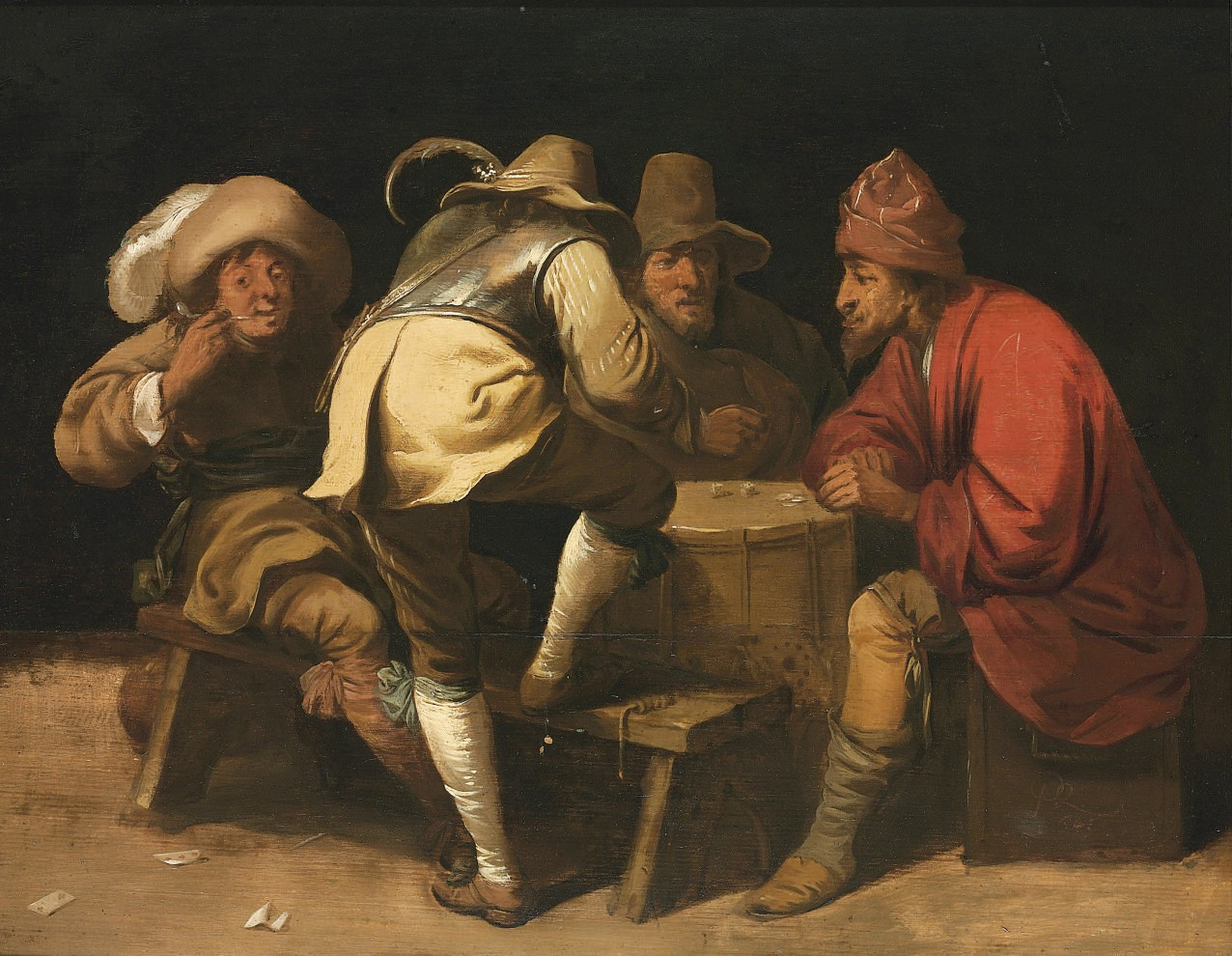
Soldiers Gambling with Dice, Private collection

Pieter Jansz. Quast (bap. 17 April 1605 – buried 29 May 1647) was a Dutch Golden Age painter, draughtsman of portraits and sculptor.

== Life ==
According to the Ecartico website, Pieter Jansz Quast (brush), was the son of Jan Sijmensz, a barge master and Sybrich Gerritsdr both from Emden who married in 1603. He grew up near Zeedijk. On 29 June 1632 he promised to marry in the village of Sloten near Amsterdam Annetje Splinters, a flower painter from The Hague. She sued him for breaking his marriage vows and forced him to marry her half a year later. They moved to The Hague where he was admitted to the local Guild of Saint Luke in 1634.

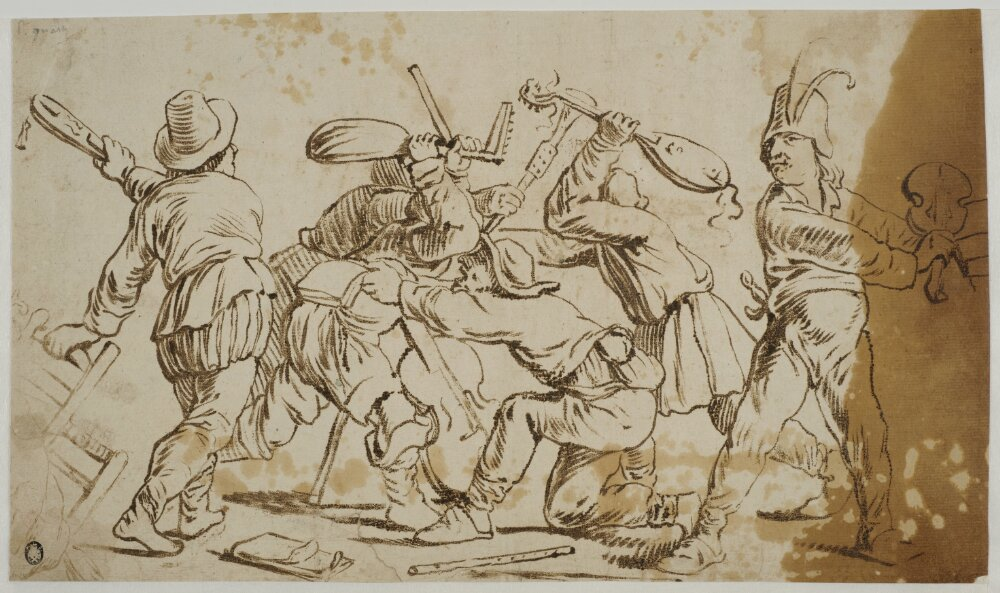
Pieter Jansz. Quast - Musicians Fighting. Nationalmuseum Stockholm

Pieter Quast probably lived in a house at Paviljoensgracht which he bought in late 1639. In early 1644 he had this property put in the name of his wife, possibly to avoid creditors. By then Anna and her husband had been living in Amsterdam for at least six months and had accumulated a rent debt for a house on Kalverstraat. This address was several times the scene of conflicts.

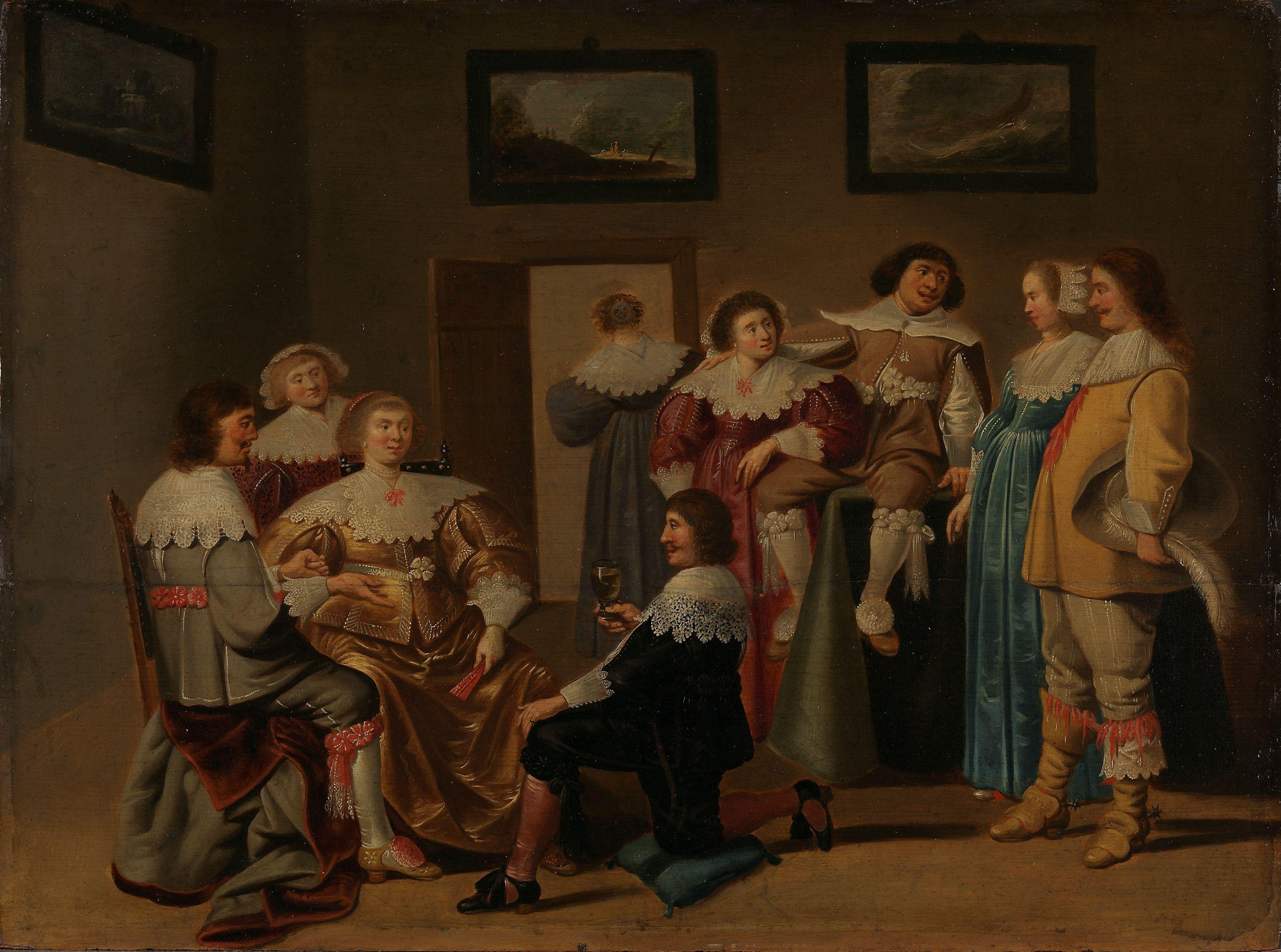
Pieter Jansz. Quast - Elegant company National Museum of Art, Architecture and Design, Oslo

His time in The Hague and Amsterdam is marked by constantly moving to poorer quarters, bankruptcy and participation in illegal dice-games. In 1639 he collaborated with Jan Stampioen the math teacher of William II of Orange, who was also painted by Quast. He competed with Pieter Codde and Willem Duyster who had a similar style and was influenced Adriaen Brouwer. His style is characterized by humor, satire and caricature.

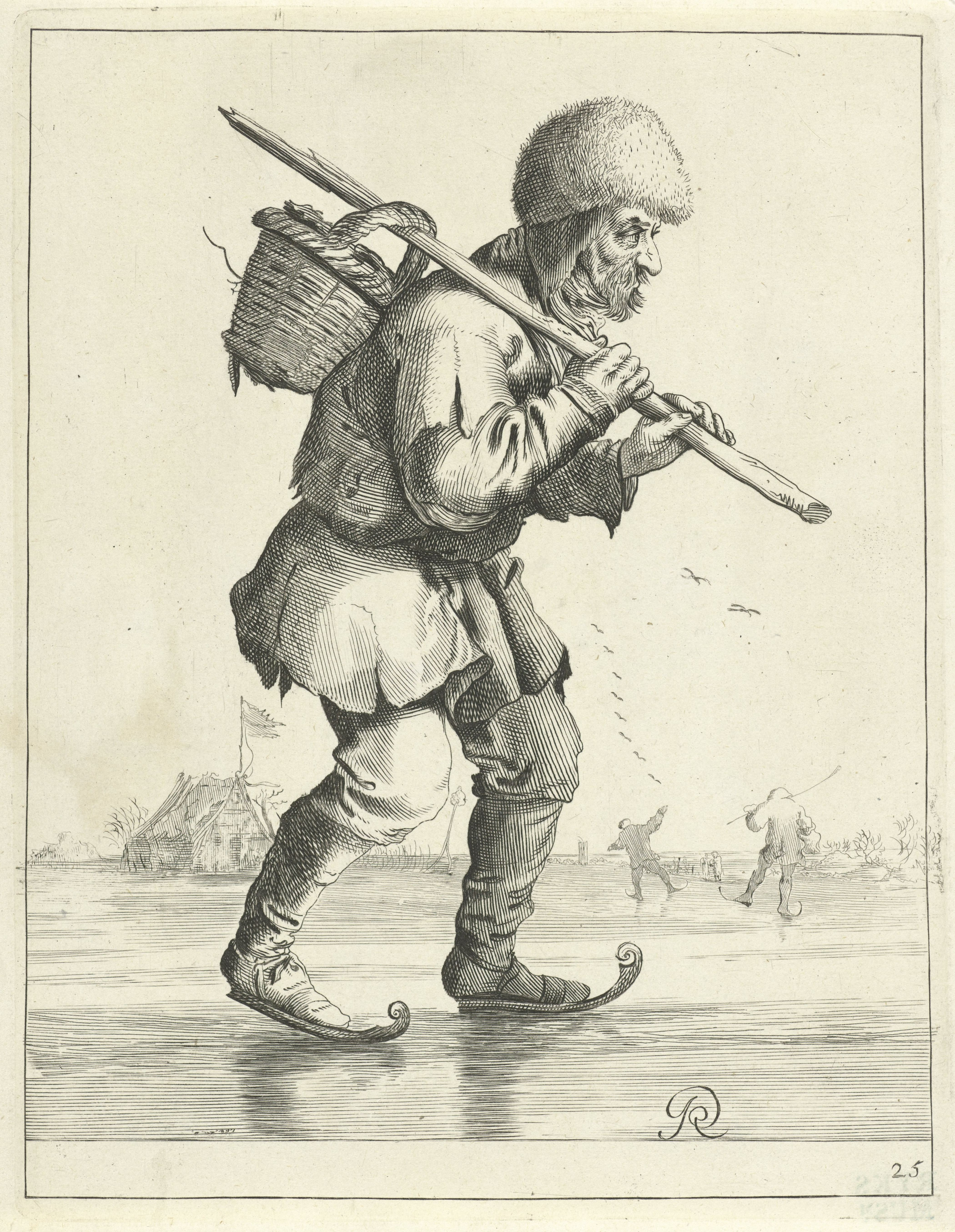
Schaatsende boer Bedelaars en boeren (serietitel), RP-P-OB-16.366

However the young couple faced a financially bumpy life, with several disturbing happenings due to Annetje's unruly character. The most imagining scene Annetje's face being mutilated by Gaspar Roebergen with the base of a smashed ("Roemer") glass in their home at the Kalverstraat after she insulted him having visited numerous prostitutes. The quarrel had to do with the rent, which he collected.

At times he collaborated with Herman Doomer, a furniture maker, and Salomon Savery, an engraver. His pupils were Jan Jansz Buesem and Dirck Cornelis de Hooch. He was not only baptized but also buried in the Nieuwe Kerk, Amsterdam.

In 1647 Pieter Quast lived on the Nes, in a house that, according to a statement dated May 17, 1647, was shabby and uninhabitable due to leaks; he refused to pay the rent. He died two weeks later.

It is questionable he died in poverty. After her husband's death, Anna Splinters returned to The Hague, with two daughters. There she had a new house built on Paviljoensgracht, which she rented out. In 1650 she married the Leiden painter Jacob van Spreeuwen. In 1659 she died at Lindengracht in the Jordaan.

== Works ==
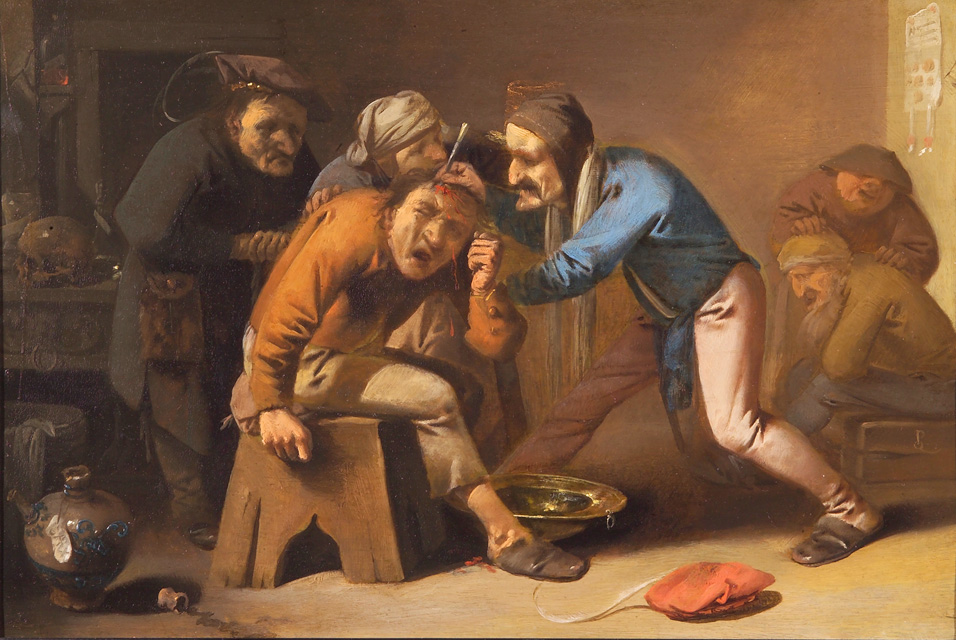
Pieter Jansz Quast - Extraction of the Stone of Folly, ca 1630

Mostly producing small social genre paintings with humorous, cartoon-like features, ranging from elegant merry companies to guardroom scenes with officers and (most numerous) groups of peasants or beggars, in a variety of styles which can be related to those of leading artists in these genres, but with personal aspects in the colouring and style. They "are heavily and powerfully rendered in warm shades of brown, set off by strong local colouring in the principal figures. His successful peasant scenes are characterized by the use of strong chiaroscuro and a gentle, harmonious palette. The caricatural quality of Quast’s peasants recalls the work of his fellow-resident of The Hague, Adriaen van de Venne, but Quast’s looser style and many of his individual types are closer to the paintings of Adriaen Brouwer, as well as of Adriaen van Ostade, to whom Quast’s best work has sometimes been ascribed".

Quast was influenced by the French engrapher Jacques Callot and even called the Dutch Callot. With his caricatured images on often small panels, Quast provided commentary on the Golden Age. He produced finished drawings for sale, often on parchment, and these included landscapes, cityscapes and biblical scenes. Some of his works were engraved, likely by Salomon Savery.

== Sources ==
- Catalogue raisonné du cabinet d'estampes de feu Monsieur Winckler (1805)
- BREDIUS, A. (1902). "Pieter Jansz. Quast". Oud Holland. 20 (2): 65–82. doi:10.1163/187501702X00072. JSTOR 42721978.
- Leeuwenberg, J. “Beeldhouwwerk van de Schilder Pieter Quast.” Bulletin van Het Rijksmuseum, vol. 14, no. 2, 1966, pp. 60–64. JSTOR, http://www.jstor.org/stable/40381441. Accessed 1 Mar. 2023.
- Barbara Ann Stanton-Hirst (1978) The influence of the theatre on the works of Pieter Jansz. Quast
- Jessica Roeders (2004) "Voorts den teekeningen, dien gij speuren zult, zijn gemaekt van den geestigen Pieter Quast". Een oeuvrebeschijving. Doctoraalscriptie UvA.
