= Savery Pond (Plymouth, Massachusetts) =

Lake in Plymouth, Massachusetts

- Location within Massachusetts Location within the United States
- Location: Plymouth, Massachusetts
- Coordinates: 41°50′50″N 70°33′00″W
- Basin countries: United States
- Surface area: 33 acres (13 ha)
- Settlements: Eastland Heights neighborhood of Ellisville

Savery Pond is a 33-acre (130,000 m^{2}) pond in Ellisville section of Plymouth, Massachusetts, in the Eastland Heights neighborhood, approximately 2,000 feet (610 m) from Route 3A off Old Sandwich Road. Indian Head Campground maintains a beach along the southern shore of the pond.
