= Geertruydt Roghman =

Dutch artist (1625–1657)

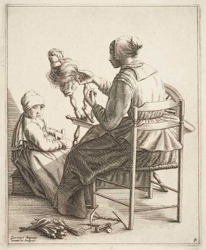
Woman spinning with a child in an interior (Dutch: Spinster)

Geertruydt Roghman (1625, in Amsterdam – before 1657, in Amsterdam), was a Dutch Golden Age painter, engraver, and printmaker.

== Biography ==
Roghman was born in Amsterdam, the daughter of the engraver Henrick Lambertsz Roghman and Maria Jacobs Savery. According to the RKD she was the oldest sister of Roelant and Magdalena Roghman and the painter Roelant Savery was her great-uncle. She probably worked in her father's workshop and in her short life did not produce a large body of work. She is best known for the 14 prints based on sketches by her brother Roelant that were published in Amsterdam by Claes Jansz Visscher called Pleasant Landscapes or amusing scenes drawn from life by Roelant Rogman. These scenes sold well throughout the latter half of the 17th century and early 18th century and served as inspiration to landscape painters. She is also known for original work; a series of 5 prints she engraved herself of women working in interiors.
