= Gerrit de Hooch =

Dutch painter

Gerrit de Hooch was a 17th-century Dutch painter of italianate landscapes, who lived and worked in The Hague, Dutch Repbublic.

He was a member of the local guild of artists, the Confrerie Pictura since 1660. Born as a son of local bailiff Eliseus de Hoog (also de Hooch) and Josina van Platen, who married in 1629 in The Hague. Gerrit's wife, Anna van Eyck (born The Hague 1629, married 1660 The Hague), is recorded widow in 1680. Anna's father was Hermanus van Eyck, who had the great philosopher Daniel Heinsius as an uncle and tutor. Gerrit himself is related to the portrait painter Dirck Cornelis de Hooch, who was his father's brother. Gerrit's son Eliseus de Hooch was a painter, too (Mr Constrijkschilder) and an engraver in silver. Eliseus worked and lived in The Hague and Rotterdam. Gerrit's daughter Josyanna Maria de Hooch married the painter Frederick Bernaerts, who lived and worked in The Hague. It is likely that Gerrit is related to the engraver Cornelis de Hooghe, who claimed to be one of Emperor Charles V's bastard sons and was executed for conspiracy in 1583. One or two works by Gerrit the Hooch are known today, but their attribution is dubious. Relation to the famous painter Pieter de Hooch or to the engraver Romeyn de Hooghe are highly unlikely. Gerrit de Hooch was a friend of the painters Caspar Netscher and Melchior d'Hondecoeter. The first one attended the baptism of a daughter Margaretha in 1676, named after Caspar's wife Margaretha Godijn. The latter signed Gerrit's last will. Gerrit rented a house that was owned by the painter Nicolaas Willingh and he testified against the painter Pieter Plantijn, who had left his Irish wife. Gerrit owned some houses himself in The Hague but sold several of them, presumably because he was in constant debt.
