= Roelant Roghman =

Dutch Golden Age painter, sketcher and engraver

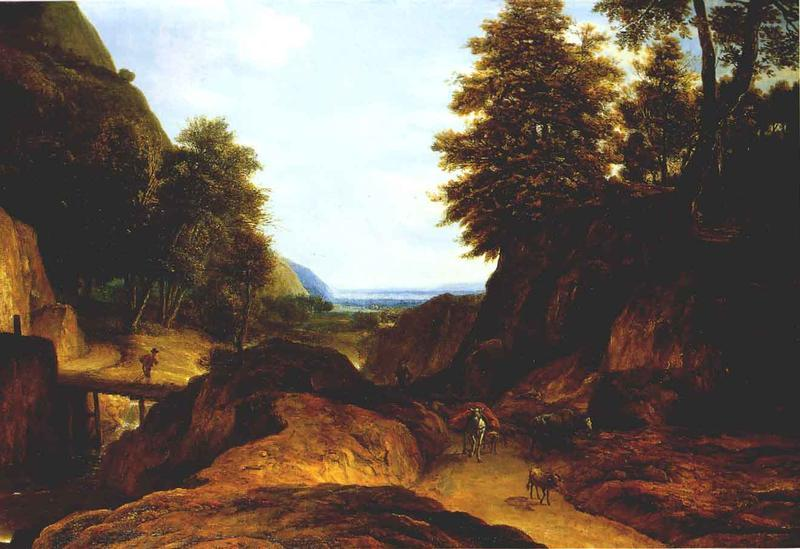
Valley with travellers.

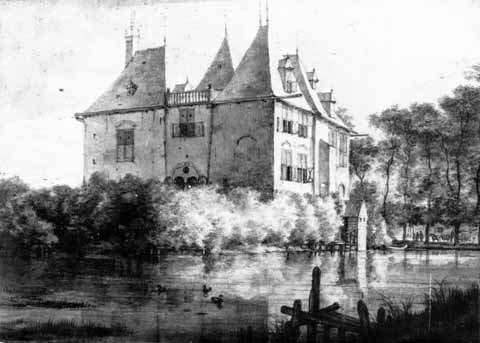
Castle Develstein by Roghman, (1647)

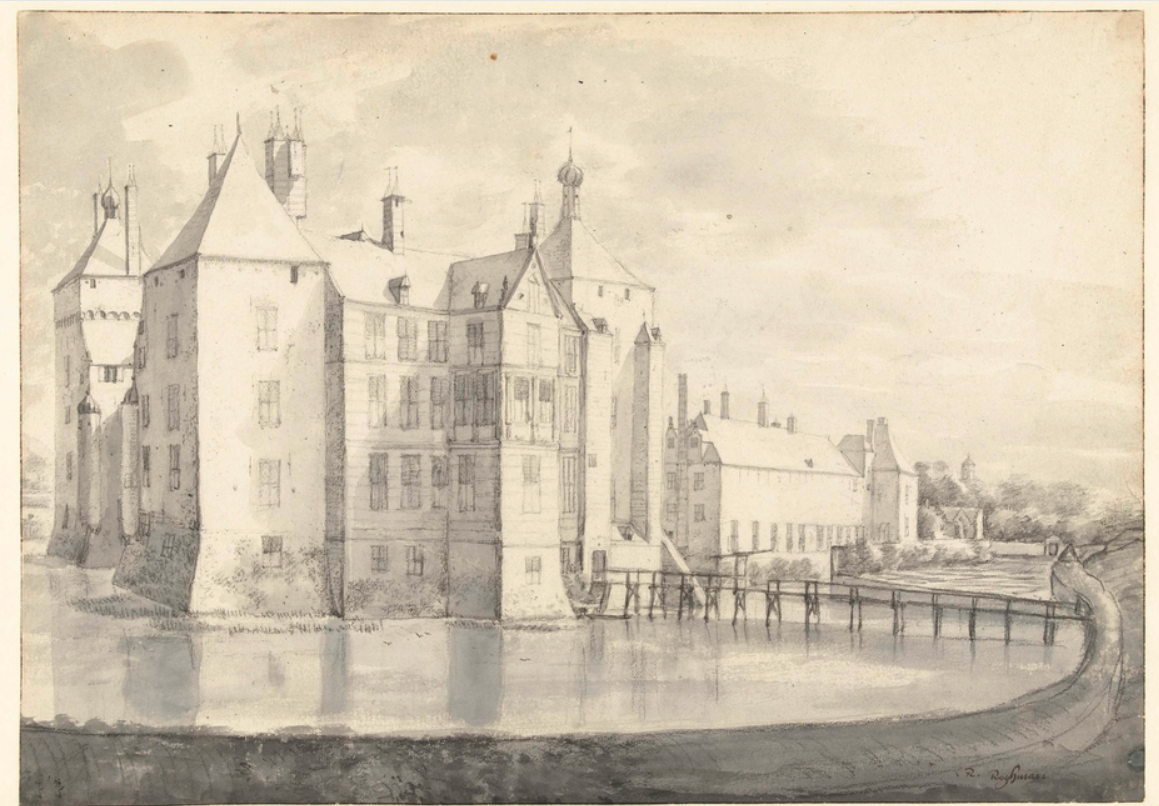
Castle Buren

Roelant Roghman (14 March 1627 – 3 January 1692) was a Dutch Golden Age painter, sketcher and engraver.

== Biography ==
Roghman was born in Amsterdam, the son of the engraver Henrick Lambertsz Roghman and Maria Jacobs Savery. His mother was a daughter of the Savery family, and Roghman became a student of his namesake and great-uncle, Roelant Savery. According to Houbraken, he only had one eye, but painted in a rough and ready way, that perhaps was the result of his eyesight. He specialized in landscapes, and in later life became a history buff, working on several prints of old castle ruins and defunct family estates based on drawings he made during travels in his youth. He was a follower of Rembrandt and Hercules Seghers. Houbraken claimed that in his youth he had been a friend of Rembrandt and Gerbrant van den Eekhout.

Roghman worked on one of his print series with his sister Geertruydt in (ca. 1645-1648), under the title Plaisante Landschappen (pleasant landscapes) by the printer Claes Jansz Visscher. His other sister Magdalena was also an engraver. Their landscape series of more than 200 prints, showing mostly castles and landed estates in the Dutch provinces of North Holland and Utrecht, were very popular. He never married, and died a resident of the old men's almshouse in Amsterdam.

Roghman was the teacher of Jan Griffier and Pieter Wouwerman.
