= Roelant Savery =

Flemish-born Dutch Golden Age painter

Roelant Savery in Cornelis de Bie's Het Gulden Cabinet.

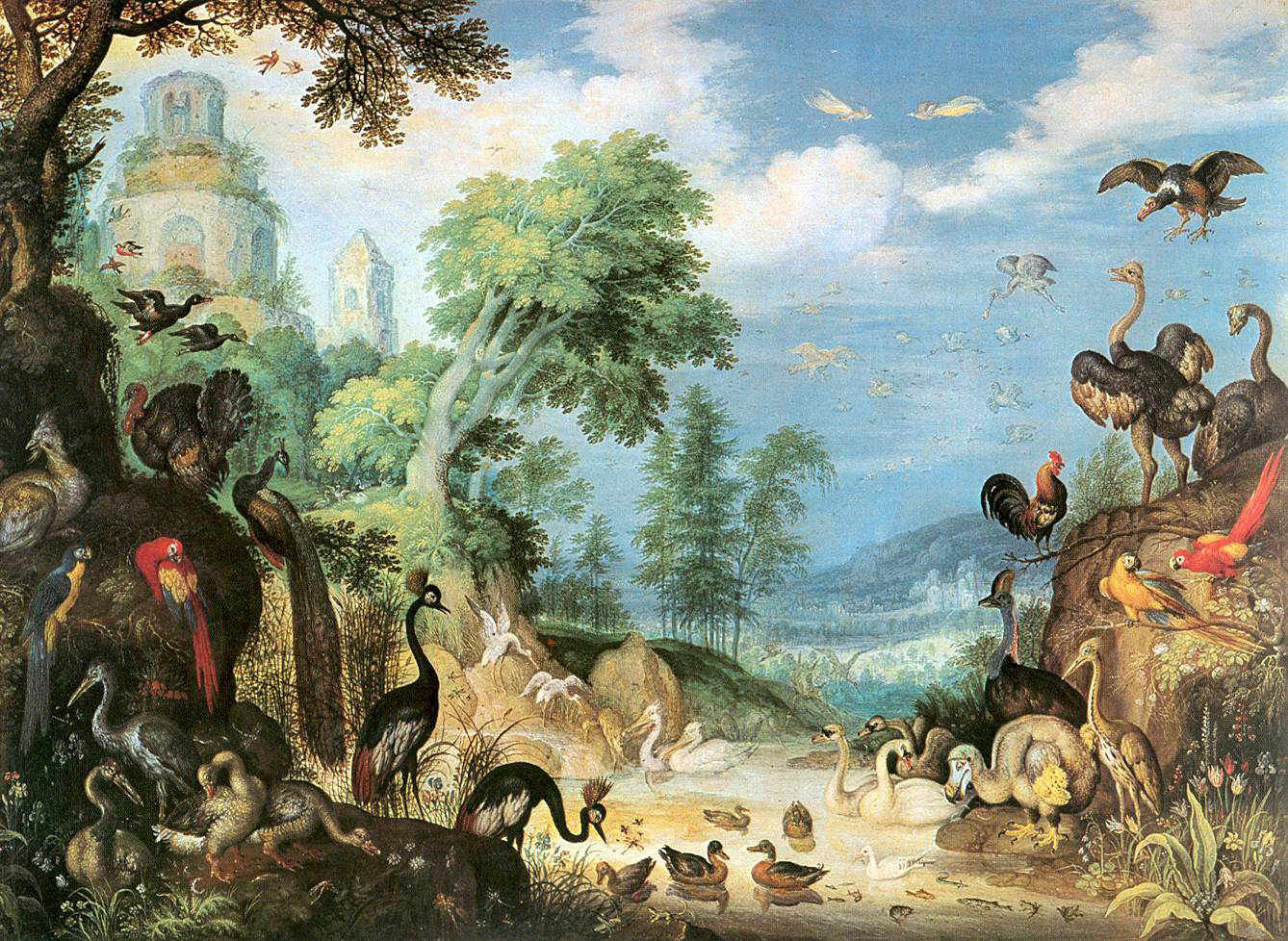
Landscape with Birds showing a dodo in the lower right and an unknown macaw on the left, by Roelant Savery, 1628

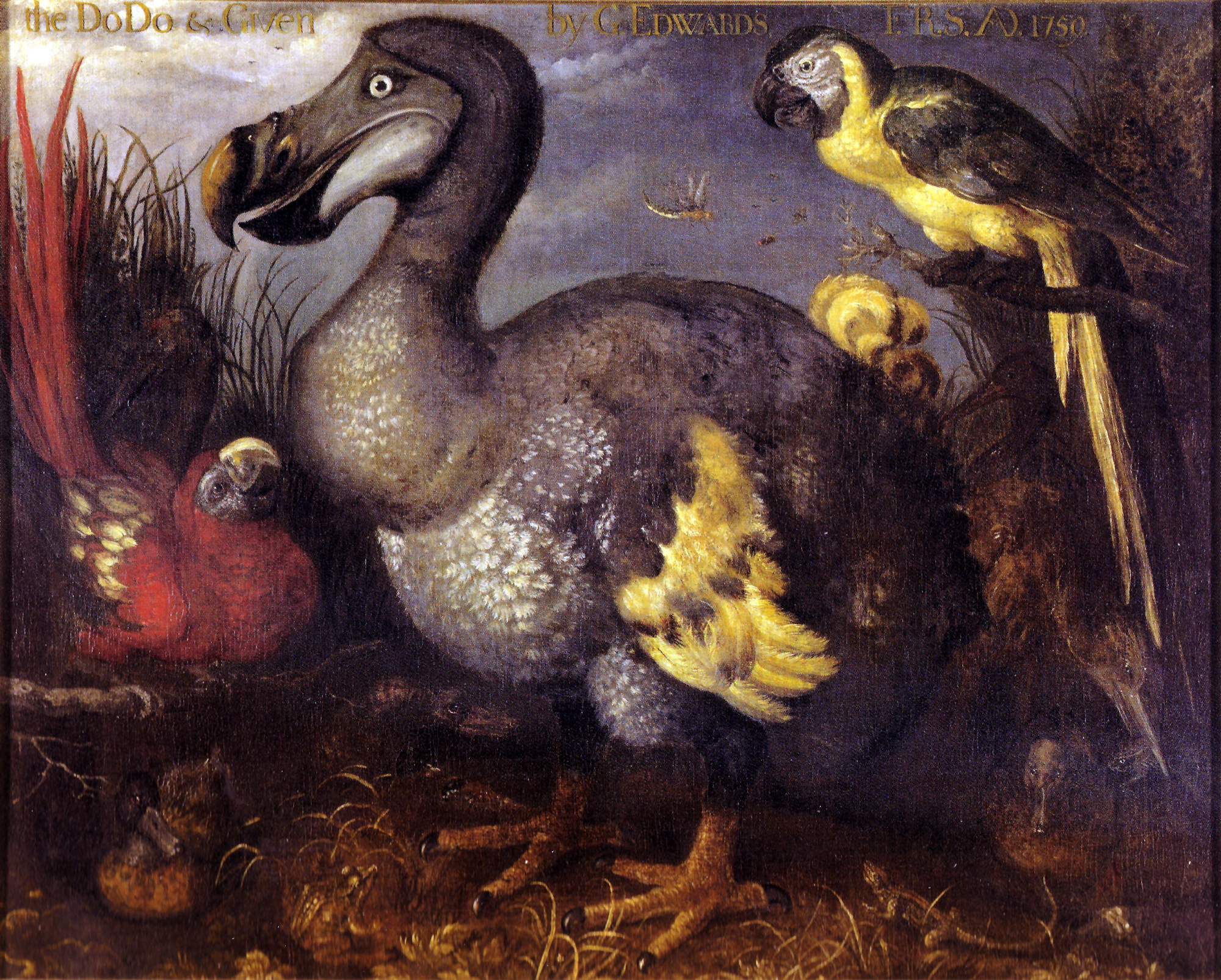
One of the most famous paintings of a dodo, from 1626. The image came into the possession of the ornithologist George Edwards, who later gave it to the British Museum. The same unknown macaw appears on the right

Roelant Savery (or Roeland(t) Maertensz Saverij, or de Savery, or many variants; 1576 – buried 25 February 1639) was a Flanders-born Dutch Golden Age painter.

== Life ==
Savery was born in Kortrijk in 1576. He belonged to an Anabaptist family that fled north from the Spanish-occupied Southern Netherlands when Roelant was about 4 years old and settled in Haarlem around 1585. He was taught painting by his older brother Jacob Savery (c. 1565 – 1603) and Hans Bol.

After his schooling, Savery traveled to Prague around 1604, where he became court painter of the Emperors Rudolf II (1552–1612) and Mathias (1557–1619), who had made their court a center of mannerist art. Between 1606 and 1608 he traveled to Tyrol to study plants. Gillis d'Hondecoeter became his pupil.

Before 1616 Savery moved back to Amsterdam, and lived in the Sint Antoniesbreestraat. In 1618 he settled in Utrecht, where he joined the artist's guild a year later. His nephew Hans would become his most important assistant.

In 1621 Savery bought a large house on the Boterstraat in Utrecht. The house had a large garden with flowers and plants, where a number of fellow painters, like Adam Willaerts were frequent visitors. Savery had kept his house in Amsterdam, and had one child baptized in Nieuwe Kerk (Amsterdam).

Savery was friends with still life painters like Balthasar van der Ast and Ambrosius Bosschaert. In the 1620s he was one of the most successful painters in Utrecht, but later his life got troubled, perhaps because of heavy drinking. Though he would have pupils until the late 1630s, amongst which Allaert van Everdingen and Roelant Roghman, he went bankrupt in 1638 and died in Utrecht half a year later.

== Works ==
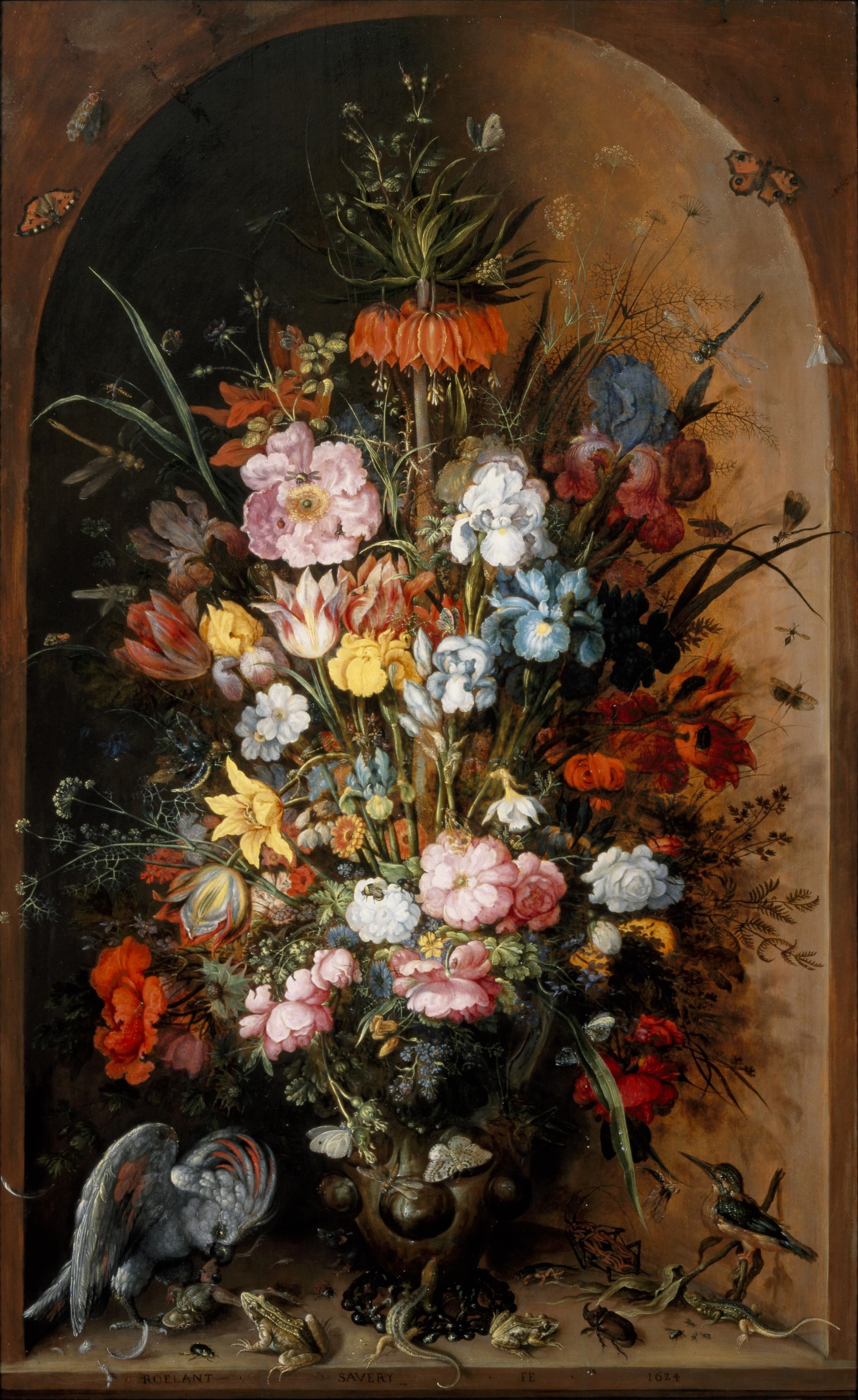
Still life (130x80cm, 1624). The largest painting he ever made, with 44 different species of animals and 63 species of flowers.

Savery primarily painted landscapes in the Flemish tradition of Gillis van Coninxloo, often embellished with many meticulously painted animals and plants, regularly with a mythological or biblical theme as background. He also painted multiple flower still lifes; bouquets in stone niches, sometimes with lizards such as Flowers with Two Lizards, insects or fallen petals and regarded as his best work.

His unique style of painting, related to the then reigning Mannerism, has been highly popular with collectors and can be found in many museums in Europe and North America. His preparatory drawings are also valued highly.

Among his best-known works are several depictions of the now-extinct dodo painted between 1611 and 1628. His nephew Hans a.k.a. Jan Savery was also known for his paintings of the dodo (including a famous 1651 illustration currently held at the Oxford University Museum of Natural History), which he probably copied from his uncle's work.

== Extinct birds ==
Savery is famous for being the most prolific and influential illustrator of the extinct dodo, having made ten depictions, often showing it in the lower corners. A famous painting of his from 1626, now called Edwards' Dodo as it was once owned by the ornithologist George Edwards, has since become the standard image of a dodo. It is housed in the Natural History Museum, London. This and his other images are the source for many other dodo illustrations.

Less well known is the appearance in the same paintings of an unknown blue and yellow macaw, different from the typical Ara ararauna of South America. It was suggested that these figures represent the Martinique macaw (Ara martinicus), a hypothetical species only known otherwise from a couple of brief descriptions in the 17th century.
