= Mapp and Lucia (disambiguation) =

Mapp and Lucia is a 1931 novel by E. F. Benson.

Mapp and Lucia may also refer to:

- Mapp and Lucia (novel series)
- Mapp & Lucia (1985 TV series)
- Mapp & Lucia (2014 TV series)
