= Tilling (Sussex) =

Fictional English town in novels by E. F. Benson

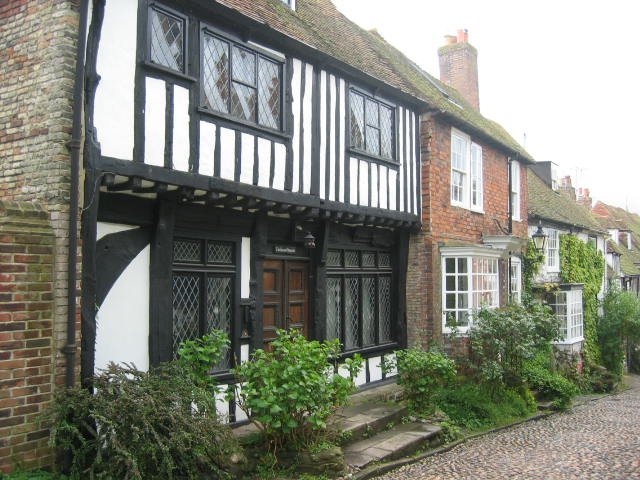
Porpoise Street, Tilling (Mermaid Street, Rye)

Tilling is a fictional coastal town, based on Rye, East Sussex, in the Mapp and Lucia novels of Edward Frederic Benson (1867–1940).

== Town in the novels of E. F. Benson ==
Tilling takes its name from the River Tillingham which flows through Rye. Benson himself moved to Rye in 1918, where he lived in Lamb House, former home of the novelist Henry James. Benson was mayor of Rye 1934-7 and was elected Speaker of the Cinque Ports in 1936.

== Mapp and Lucia ==
Tilling first appeared in Miss Mapp (1922) and subsequently in The Male Impersonator and Desirable Residences (short stories of 1929), Mapp and Lucia (1931), in which Emmeline Lucas ("Lucia") and Elizabeth Mapp clashed for the first time, Lucia's Progress (1935) and Trouble for Lucia (1939). The novelist Susan Leg, the subject of Secret Lives (1932), re-appeared in Trouble for Lucia.

The first Lucia book, Queen Lucia, was published in 1920. It was followed in 1927 by Lucia in London. Benson's The Freaks of Mayfair (1916) provided the genesis of some of the characters of Tilling. Specifically, "Aunt Georgie", a bachelor with a penchant for embroidery, provided the model for George Pillson, who, as with Lucia, with whom he entered into a platonic marriage in Lucia's Progress, originally lived at Riseholme (thought to have been modelled on Broadway) in the Cotswolds.

In Benson's final Lucia book, Trouble for Lucia, Tilling seems to be no longer in Sussex but in Hampshire.

In the 1980s, following the adaptations by Gerald Savory (1909–96) of Benson's novels for London Weekend Television (1985–86), in which Tilling was referred to as "Tilling-on-Sea" (a form unknown in the books), two pastiches by Tom Holt (b. 1961), based in Tilling, were published by Macmillan: Lucia in Wartime (1985) and Lucia Triumphant (1986). Holt also produced a short story, Diplomatic Incident, for the former Tilling Society in 1998 and another called Great Minds for the Friends of Tilling in 2006. The Friends of Tilling organise an annual gathering in Rye each September for devotees of Mapp & Lucia and E F Benson's other comic novels. Two other Tilling books, Major Benjy and Au Reservoir, were written by Guy Fraser-Sampson and published by Troubador. In 2014 the BBC made a new three-part series adapted by Steve Pemberton (who also played Georgie Pillson) from the original Mapp and Lucia novel.

== Topography ==
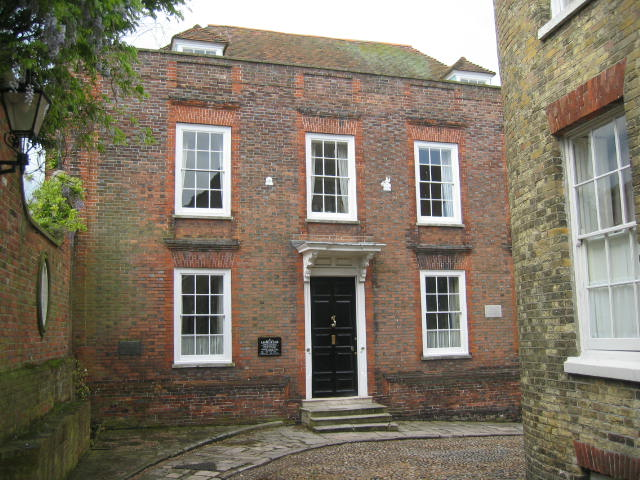
Lamb House, Rye: home of E F Benson and model for Mallards in Tilling

Lamb House was the model for "Mallards", the home initially of Elizabeth Mapp and subsequently of Lucia, who renamed it Mallards House.

Cynthia & Tony Reavell (1984) E F Benson: Mr Benson remembered in Rye, and the World of Tilling contained a map of Tilling that drew on references in the books and the layout of Rye itself. A similar plan was reproduced in Holt's novels. In some instances, the street names of Tiling and Rye coincided – for example, High Street (the location of Godiva Plaistow's house, "Wasters") and West Street ("Quaint" Irene Coles' "Taormina") – but there were some variations: Mermaid Street became, in Tilling, Porpoise Street (where Algernon and Susan Wyse lived); Market Road was Malleson Street (Woolgar & Pipstow, the estate agents); and Watchbell Street was Curfew Street (the Trader's Arms).

In Rye a lookout, presented by Benson when he was mayor in 1935, stands towards the River Rother and Camber, with a plaque noting that its donor had "immortalised" the town as Tilling through his books.

== Tilling Gazette ==
The local newspaper in the TV version was the Tilling Gazette and in the book Lucia's Progress it was the Hastings Chronicle but in Trouble for Lucia, this inexplicably became the Hampshire Argus (editor, Mr McConnell). (In Savory's adaptation for television, McConnell was introduced to Elizabeth Mapp by her intoxicated husband, Major Mapp-Flint, as "a veritable pilling of Tillar".)

== Imports from Riseholme ==
The custom of saying "au reservoir" as a valediction (in place of the French au revoir) was a feature of Miss Mapp, and Elizabeth Mapp is said to have heard it during a visit to "that sweet and refined village called Riseholme." In Mapp and Lucia it is further revealed that Lucia herself had invented it, one summer when Elizabeth had stayed at the Ambermere Arms. The lexicographer Eric Partridge suggested that in fact the term had originated in America in the 1880s.

Lucia's celebrated recipe Lobster à la Riseholme was first served in Tilling in Mapp and Lucia.

== Rail and tramways ==
A railway station opened in Rye in 1851 and there are various references in the Benson books to a local station. In the BBC's 2014 dramatisation, townsfolk gather at a station depicted as "Tilling Town" in the hope of catching a glimpse of the Prince of Wales. In John van Druten's play, Make Way for Lucia (1948), based on Benson's novels, Lucia refers to Georgie Pillson and Major Benjamin Flint having breakfasted together in East Tilling. This appears to be the next station on the line between Tilling and London.

Some of Benson's characters, notably Major Flint, use a tramway to get to the golf links outside the town. This was based on the Rye and Camber Tramway, which closed for good during the Second World War. The links station building remains, across the Rother from Rye Harbour, as does evidence of the track bed.

== Riseborough ==
Benson's Mrs Ames (1912) was set in Riseborough, which also bore a resemblance to Rye. Though this antedated Benson's move to Rye, he already knew the town well, having, for example, first visited Henry James at Lamb House in 1900.

== Patricia Wentworth: Tilling Green ==
A village called Tilling Green, in the fictional county of Ledshire, appeared in one of Patricia Wentworth's Miss Silver stories, Poison in the Pen (1955).
