= Mapp and Lucia (novel series) =

Series of novels by E. F. Benson

Mapp and Lucia is a series of novels by E. F. Benson.

The first novel, Queen Lucia, was published in 1920, and introduced Mrs. Emmeline "Lucia" Lucas, the social leader in the fictional town of Riseholme, her husband Philip "Pepino" Lucas, best friend Georgie Pillson, and rival Daisy Quantock. The second novel, Miss Mapp, was published in 1922, and introduced Miss Elizabeth Mapp, the ferocious queen of another fictional seaside town, Tilling. The third, Lucia in London (1927), brought Lucia and Pepino from Riseholme to London, while her Riseholme neighbours seethed.

With the fourth novel, Mapp and Lucia (1931), Benson brought the characters from the previous three books together, with a freshly-widowed Lucia moving to Tilling with Georgie, and battling Mapp for control of the town's social life. This storyline continued in Lucia's Progress (1935) and Trouble for Lucia (1939), making six books in all.

The 1985 television adaptation, originally broadcast on Channel 4, starred Geraldine McEwan as Lucia, Prunella Scales as Mapp and Nigel Hawthorne as Georgie, in ten episodes adapting the fourth, fifth and sixth novels.

The 2014 television series, originally broadcast on BBC One, starred Anna Chancellor as Lucia, Miranda Richardson as Mapp, and Steve Pemberton as Georgie, in three episodes adapting Mapp and Lucia, and incorporating a storyline from Queen Lucia.

== The novels ==
The novels feature humorous incidents in the lives of (mainly) upper-middle-class British characters in the 1920s and 1930s, who vie for social prestige and one-upmanship in an atmosphere of extreme cultural snobbery. Several of them are set in the small seaside town of Tilling, closely based on Rye, East Sussex, where Benson lived for a number of years and (like Lucia) served as mayor. Lucia previously lived at Riseholme, based on Broadway, Worcestershire, whence she brought to Tilling her celebrated recipe for Lobster à la Riseholme.

"Mallards", the home of Miss Mapp—and subsequently Lucia—was based on Lamb House in Rye, Benson’s own residence. The house had previously been the residence of Henry James and had a garden room overlooking the street.

The novels, in chronological order, are:

- Queen Lucia (1920)
- Miss Mapp (1922)
- Lucia in London (1927)
- Mapp and Lucia (1931)
- Lucia's Progress (1935) (published in the U.S. as The Worshipful Lucia)
- Trouble for Lucia (1939)

The first three books concern only the protagonist named in the title; the last three feature both Mapp and Lucia.

In 1977 Thomas Y. Crowell Company reprinted all six novels in a compendium called Make Way for Lucia. The order of Miss Mapp and Lucia in London was switched in the compendium, and a Miss Mapp short story called "The Male Impersonator" was included between Miss Mapp and Mapp and Lucia.

"Desirable Residences", one further short story featuring Miss Mapp which had previously seen only one magazine printing in Benson's own time, was discovered by Jack Adrian in the 1990s and included in his collection of Benson stories, Desirable Residences. A slight oddity about this very short piece is that the town of Tilling was called Tillingham in the original printing, according to Adrian's introduction to his collection. The characters of Miss Mapp and Diva Plaistow are clearly recognizable, however, as are their desirable residences. Miss Mapp, for example, here lives in Mallards.

The character Susan Leg, appearing briefly in Trouble for Lucia, first appeared as a major character in Benson's novel Secret Lives (1932), which is similar in style to the Mapp and Lucia books.

== Books by other authors ==
There are additional books based on the same characters, written by other authors.

Tom Holt wrote two full-length sequels, published by Macmillan and Black Swan:

- Lucia in Wartime (1985)
- Lucia Triumphant (1986)

- There are also several short stories, including "Lucia and the Diplomatic Incident" (1997)

Guy Fraser-Sampson has written three additional novels, the first published by Troubador, the second and third by Elliott and Thompson Ltd:

- Major Benjy (2008)
- Lucia on Holiday (2012)
- Au Reservoir (2014)

Hugh Ashton wrote five novels:

- Mapp at Fifty (2020)
- Mapp's Return(2020)
- La Lucia(2020)
- A Tilling New Year (2021)
- The Tillings Smugglers (2022)

P.E. Henderson wrote two novels:

- Lucia and the Tramp (2023)
- Mapp and Lucia: The Aviatresses (2024)

Deryck J. Solomon (who, in 2021, also published a Mapp and Lucia Glossary) wrote:

- Mallards Revisited: More Sacred & Profane Memories of E.F.Benson's Mapp & Lucia in Tilling(2023)

And Geoff Martin has published thirteen books in his Mapp and Lucia series between 2015 and 2024

== Television and radio ==
=== Channel 4 TV ===
The television series based on the three 1930s books, produced by London Weekend Television, was filmed in Rye and neighbouring Winchelsea in the 1980s, and starred Prunella Scales as Mapp, Geraldine McEwan as Lucia, Denis Lill as Major Benjy Flint, and Nigel Hawthorne as Georgie. There were ten episodes, (which aired in two series of five) broadcast on Channel 4 in 1985 and 1986.

=== BBC TV ===
A three-part adaptation written by Steve Pemberton was broadcast on BBC One on 29–31 December 2014. It starred Miranda Richardson as Mapp and Anna Chancellor as Lucia.

=== BBC Radio 4 1980s ===
Several radio adaptations by Aubrey Woods starring Barbara Jefford as Lucia and Jonathan Cecil as George - including "Queen Lucia" dramatised as five 45-min. radio plays.

=== BBC Radio 4 2000s ===
Several radio adaptations by Ned Sherrin and then John Peacock starring Belinda Lang as Lucia, Nichola McAuliffe as Mapp and Guy Henry as George.

== Lobster à la Riseholme ==
Lobster à la Riseholme /ˈrɪzəm/ was a famed (ultimately infamous) gastronomic dish served by Lucia (Mrs Emmeline Lucas) in two of the Mapp and Lucia novels.

The recipe was never revealed, but, in the manner of Mrs Beeton, began with the words "Take two hen lobsters ..." It took its name from the village of Riseholme, where Lucia lived before moving to Tilling, although the dish did not appear in either of the two novels set while Lucia was at Riseholme.

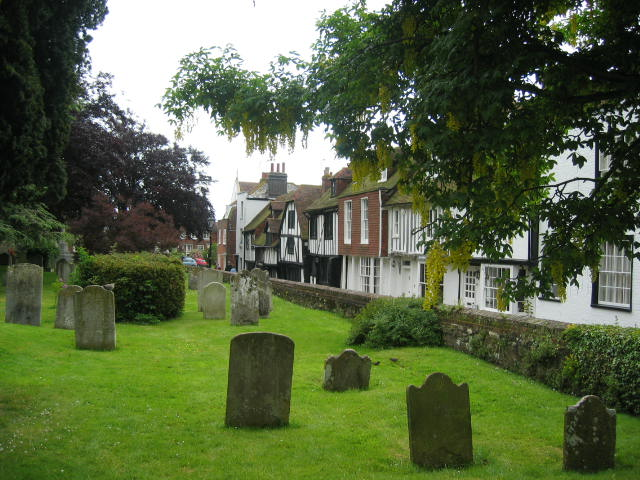
Tilling (Rye), where Lucia served Lobster à la Riseholme

Lucia first serves Lobster à la Riseholme in Tilling to her friend George ("Georgie") Pillson in Mapp and Lucia (1931) to cheer him up after he discovers that his housemaid Foljambe intends to marry. It then appears at a luncheon party a few weeks later. Lucia resists attempts to reveal the recipe, despite the custom in Tilling of sharing favourite recipes. Lucia's cook refuses Elizabeth Mapp's bribe of half a crown (two shillings and sixpence) to provide a copy. Elizabeth attempts to create the recipe—"Lobster à la Riseholme à la Mapp", as Benson called it—at a party of her own, but it is not a success. In Gerald Savory's adaptation for television (London Weekend Television 1984) Lucia's guests vie with each other to guess the additional ingredients—shrimps, cream, tomato, cheese, and Marsala are all suggested—but this does not happen in the book. On Boxing Day 1930, Elizabeth enters Lucia's kitchen at Grebe, on the outskirts of Tilling, and is able, in Lucia's absence, to transcribe the recipe. Lucia discovers her in the act, but before excuses can be given, the sea wall breaks and Lucia and Elizabeth are swept away on the flood, clinging to the kitchen table. They languish for some weeks on an Italian fishing vessel on the Gallagher Bank, eventually returning to Tilling, where Elizabeth discovers that the recipe has survived the ordeal. Elizabeth subsequently serves a correct Lobster à la Riseholme at her wedding breakfast, at which point the reason for her being in Lucia's kitchen becomes clear. The dish is served again in Lucia's Progress (1935) at Lucia's housewarming party following her move to Elizabeth's former residence, Mallards.

Lobster à la Riseholme reappears in Tom Holt's pastiche, Lucia in Wartime (1985), set early in the Second World War. Having mastered "Woolton pie" (an officially sanctioned vegetable dish named after the wartime Food Minister, Lord Woolton), Georgie's triumphant preparation of Lobster à la Riseholme, using a number of substitute ingredients, leads to his expertise being commended to the Ministry of Food. As a result, he is conscripted for a BBC radio broadcast during which, among other things, he provides a recipe for corned beef à la Riseholme. This follows speculation in Tilling as to whether he would reveal the secret of the celebrated lobster dish. Later in the novel, Holt uses the term "humble pie à la Riseholme" with reference to a likely need for humility. Various attempts have been made to create a Lobster à la Riseholme recipe, including one by a contributor to the website of TV's "domestic goddess" Nigella Lawson.
