= Riseholme (fictional village) =

Riseholme (/ˈrɪzəm/) is a fictional Elizabethan village in the Cotswolds in the "Lucia" novels of Edward Frederic Benson (1867–1940). It is thought to have been based on Broadway, Worcestershire.

== Lucia and Riseholme ==
Riseholme first appeared as the home of Emmeline Lucas ("Lucia") and her husband, Philip (a retired barrister whom she called "Peppino"), in Queen Lucia (1920). The Lucases had by then lived for ten years at The Hurst, in front of which was a Shakespearean garden. Lucia was "Queen" of Riseholme, the main figures in her circle being George ("Georgie" or "Georgino") Pillson and Daisy Quantock.

Riseholme appeared also in Lucia in London (1927), in which Lucia launched herself on London society; Mapp and Lucia (1931), in which, following Peppino's death, both Lucia and Georgie (who entered into a companionable marriage in Lucia's Progress, 1935), took holiday lets in the Sussex town of Tilling (based on Rye) where, at the end of the summer of 1930, they decided to settle. At Tilling Lucia unveiled her celebrated dish, Lobster à la Riseholme.

Lucia and Georgie visited Riseholme again in Trouble for Lucia (1939) where they stayed at the home of the operatic prima donna Olga Bracely and Lucia called on Poppy, Duchess of Sheffield, at nearby Sheffield Castle (which Benson located at "Sheffield Bottom"—unconnected to the Yorkshire Sheffield).

It was revealed in Mapp and Lucia that Lucia's great rival in Tilling, Elizabeth Mapp (Miss Mapp, 1922) had once visited Riseholme and stayed at the Ambermere Arms. She also hijacked Lucia's au reservoir (for au revoir) and presented it to Tilling society as her own.

== Sources of Riseholme ==
Cynthia and Tony Revell (1984) Mr Benson remembered in Rye, and the world of Tilling cited Sir Steven Runciman (1903–2000), a Cambridge historian who knew Benson well, and Benson's manservant Charlie Tomalin (d.1981) for the assertion that Riseholme was based on Broadway. Benson was known to have visited the American actress Mary Anderson (1859–1940), long resident in England, who lived in Broadway at Court Farm.

The name was probably derived from the village of Riseholme, near Lincoln, of whose Church of England cathedral, Benson's father, Edward White Benson, was Chancellor before becoming Bishop of Truro in 1877.

Benson used Riseborough as the name of a town similar to Rye in his novel Mrs Ames (1912).
