= Geraldine McEwan =

English actress (1932–2015)

- Born: Geraldine McKeown; 9 May 1932; Old Windsor, Berkshire, England
- Died: 30 January 2015 (aged 82); Hammersmith, London, England
- Occupation: Actress
- Years active: 1946–2011
- Spouse: Hugh Cruttwell (m. 1953; died 2002)
- Children: 2, including Greg Cruttwell

Geraldine McEwan (born Geraldine McKeown; 9 May 1932 – 30 January 2015) was an English actress, who had a long career in film, theatre and television. Michael Coveney described her, in a tribute article, as "a great comic stylist, with a syrupy, seductive voice and a forthright, sparkling manner".

McEwan was a five-time Olivier Award nominee, and twice won the Evening Standard Award for Best Actress; for The Rivals (1983) and The Way of the World (1995). She was also nominated for the 1998 Tony Award for Best Actress in a Play for The Chairs. She won the BAFTA TV Award for Best Actress for the 1990 television serial Oranges Are Not the Only Fruit, and from 2004 to 2009, she starred as the Agatha Christie sleuth Miss Marple, in the ITV series Marple.

== Early life ==
She was born Geraldine McKeown on 9 May 1932 in Old Windsor, Berkshire, England, to Donald and Norah (née Burns) McKeown. She had Irish ancestors; her maternal grandfather came from Kilkenny while her paternal grandfather came from Belfast. Her father, a printers' compositor, ran the Labour Party branch in Old Windsor, a safe Conservative seat. She later simplified the spelling of her last name from McKeown to McEwan.

McEwan won a scholarship to attend Windsor County Girls' School – at the time a private school – where she felt completely out of place, and took elocution lessons. However, in later life she said she had loved English and the teaching of Miss Meech in particular. In an interview with Cassandra Jardine of The Daily Telegraph in 2004, she said of herself around this time: "I was very shy, very private", but after reading a poem (apparently Lady Macbeth's speech "Glamis thou art and Cawdor...") at a Brownie concert: "I realised it was going to be a way in which I could manage the world. I could protect myself by losing myself in other people."

As a teenager McEwan became interested in theatre, and her theatrical career began when she was 14, as assistant stage manager at the Theatre Royal, Windsor. She made her first appearance on the Windsor stage in October 1946 as an attendant of Hippolyta in A Midsummer Night's Dream and played many parts with the Windsor Repertory Company from March 1949 to March 1951, including a role in the Ruth Gordon biographical play Years Ago opposite guest player John Clark.

== Career ==
=== From 1951 to 1971 ===
McEwan made her first West End appearance at the Vaudeville Theatre on 4 April 1951 as Christina Deed in Who Goes There! The following year she appeared at the same theatre in Sweet Madness by Peter Jones. McEwan first appeared on television in a BBC series, Crime on Our Hands (1954), with Jack Watling, Dennis Price and Sonia Dresdel. In 1957, she took over from Joan Plowright in the Royal Court production of John Osborne's play The Entertainer during its West End run at the Palace Theatre.

McEwan appeared at the Shakespeare Memorial Theatre in Stratford-upon-Avon during the late 1950s and early 1960s, during the period when it was evolving into the Stratford venue for the new Royal Shakespeare Company formed in 1960, and at The Aldwych, the RSC's original London home.

During the 1958 season in Stratford, she played Olivia in Twelfth Night in a production directed by Peter Hall. After McEwan died, The Guardian's Michael Billington wrote of this performance: "At the time Olivia tended to be played as a figure of mature grief: McEwan was young, sparky, witty and clearly brimming with desire for Dorothy Tutin's pageboy Viola." McEwan's performance, according to Dominic Shellard, split contemporary critical opinion between those observers who considered it "heretical" and others who thought it "revolutionary".

In the same season at Stratford, McEwan portrayed Marina in Pericles and Hero in Much Ado About Nothing. She returned to the theatre in 1961 to portray Ophelia in Hamlet, opposite Ian Bannen as the Prince, and Beatrice in Much Ado About Nothing with Christopher Plummer as Benedict.

In a production of Sheridan's The School for Scandal, directed by Sir John Gielgud in 1962, McEwan replaced Anna Massey as Mrs Teazle during the run at the Haymarket Theatre, London; her husband was played by Sir Ralph Richardson. After an American tour, this production was staged at the Majestic in New York in early 1963, and was McEwan's debut on Broadway. Back in England, she appeared with Kenneth Williams in the original unsuccessful 1965 production of Loot by Joe Orton, which closed at the Wimbledon Theatre before reaching London.

After this debacle, she joined the National Theatre Company, then based at the Old Vic, following the suggestion of Sir Laurence Olivier, then its artistic director, and performed in 11 productions over the next 5 years. She appeared with Olivier in Dance of Death, staged by Glen Byam Shaw and first performed in February 1967.

Olivier asserted, according to his biographer Philip Ziegler, that he had chosen August Strindberg's play partly because it had a good part for McEwan: "I didn't give a damn if I made a success, I really didn't; it was her success I was after". The notices, though, concentrated on his role as the Captain rather than McEwan's as Alice, the Captain's wife. A film version, with the same two leads, was released in 1969.

During her first period at the National, she also portrayed Angelica in William Congreve's Love for Love, Raymonde Chandebise in Georges Feydeau's A Flea in Her Ear, Millamant in Congreve's The Way of the World and Vittoria Corombona in John Webster's The White Devil. Until her roles in the plays by Strindberg and Webster, McEwan was viewed mainly as a comedian, but these parts were thought to have extended her range.

=== In the 1970s and 1980s ===
McEwan took the lead role in an adaptation for Scottish Television of Muriel Spark's The Prime of Miss Jean Brodie (1978). She was Spark's favourite in the role and came the closest to the character as Spark had imagined it; Brodie has also been portrayed on stage and screen by Vanessa Redgrave and Maggie Smith. Her other work for television in this period included roles in The Barchester Chronicles (1982) and Mapp and Lucia (1985–86) with Prunella Scales as Mapp and McEwan as Lucia.

In 1983, McEwan played Mrs Malaprop in a production of Sheridan's The Rivals at the National Theatre directed by Peter Wood, which also featured Michael Hordern as Sir Anthony Absolute. Michael Billington wrote of this performance in 2015: "It is easy to play the word-mangling Mrs Malaprop as a comic buffoon. But the whole point of McEwan's performance was that she took language with fastidious seriousness, fractionally pausing before each misplaced epithet as if ransacking her private lexicography. As I said at the time, it was like watching a demolition expert trying to construct a cathedral." For this role, McEwan won the Evening Standard Award for Best Actress.

She made her directorial debut in 1988, with the Renaissance Theatre Company's touring season, Renaissance Shakespeare on the Road, co-produced with the Birmingham Rep, and ending with a three-month repertory programme at the Phoenix Theatre in London. McEwan's contribution was a light romantic staging of As You Like It, with Kenneth Branagh playing Touchstone as an Edwardian music hall comedian.

=== Later career ===
In 1991, McEwan returned to the world of Mapp & Lucia, recording an unabridged audiobook adaptation of Queen Lucia for ISIS Audio Books. It was later re-released in 2024.

McEwan won another Evening Standard Best Actress Award in 1995 for her role as Lady Wishfort in a revival of The Way of the World, again at the National Theatre. Sheridan Morley, at that time the theatre critic of The Spectator, wrote: "Geraldine McEwan (in the performance of the night and her career) comes on looking like an ostrich which has mysteriously been crammed into a tambourine lined with fresh flowers."

With Richard Briers, she starred from November 1997 in a revival of Eugène Ionesco's absurdist play The Chairs, in a co-production between London's Royal Court Theatre (at that time temporarily based at the Duke of York's), which had staged the British premiere 40 years earlier, and Simon McBurney's Théâtre de Complicité. This production had a brief run on Broadway between April and June 1998; McEwan was nominated for a Tony Award.

Her later television credits include Oranges Are Not the Only Fruit (1990), for which she won the British Academy Television Award as Best Actress in 1991, and Mulberry (1992–93). She was also in the Cassandra episode of Red Dwarf (1999), playing a prescient computer. McEwan played the demented witch Mortianna in the film Robin Hood: Prince of Thieves (1991). In Peter Mullan's The Magdalene Sisters, (2002), she played the role of Sister Bridget. In 2001, she voiced Margaret in the audio book Richard III.

McEwan was selected by Granada Television for Marple (2004–07), a new series featuring the Agatha Christie sleuth Miss Marple. She told The New York Times in a 2005 interview when the series was first being screened by PBS, "I do enjoy playing very original and slightly eccentric characters. It is very amusing that Agatha Christie should have created this older woman who lives a very conventional life in a little country village and yet spends all her time solving violent crimes." She announced her retirement from the role early in 2008, after appearing in 12 films; she had fallen and broken a hip late the previous year. She was succeeded as Miss Marple in the series by Julia McKenzie.

In 2005, she provided the voice of Miss Thripp in the film Wallace & Gromit: The Curse of the Were-Rabbit and again in A Matter of Loaf and Death in 2008.

== Personal life and death ==
In 1953, McEwan married Hugh Cruttwell, whom she had first met when she was 14 years old, while working at the Theatre Royal, Windsor. Cruttwell was the Principal of the Royal Academy of Dramatic Art from 1965 to 1984. They had a son Greg, who is an actor and screenwriter, and a daughter named Claudia.

McEwan was reported to have declined an OBE and later, a DBE (in 2002), but she did not respond to these claims.

McEwan died on 30 January 2015 at the Charing Cross Hospital in Hammersmith, aged 82, after suffering a stroke three months earlier.

== Filmography ==
Title	Year	Roles	Notes
There Was a Young Lady	1953	Irene	
No Kidding	1960	Catherine Robinson	Beware of Children (U.S.)
Dance of Death	1969	Alice	
The Bawdy Adventures of Tom Jones	1976	Lady Bellaston	
Escape from the Dark	1976	Miss Coutt	The Littlest Horse Thieves (U.S.)
The Prime of Miss Jean Brodie	1978	Jean Brodie	7 episodes
The Barchester Chronicles	1982	Mrs Proudie	7 episodes
All for Love	1982	Miss Mountford	Series 1, Episode 3, “L’Elegance”
Mapp and Lucia	1985–1986	Emmeline Lucas (Lucia)	10 episodes
Foreign Body	1986	Lady Ammanford	
Henry V	1989	Alice	
Oranges Are Not the Only Fruit	1990	Mother	
Robin Hood: Prince of Thieves	1991	Mortianna	
Mulberry	1992–1993	Miss Farnaby	13 episodes
Moses	1995	Miriam	TV Mini-Series
Red Dwarf	1999	Cassandra	Series 8, Episode 4, "Cassandra"
The Love Letter	1999	Constance Scattergoods	
Titus	1999	Nurse	
Love's Labour's Lost	2000	Holofernia	
Contaminated Man	2000	Lilian Rodgers	
Food of Love	2002	Novotna	
The Magdalene Sisters	2002	Sister Bridget	
Pure	2002	Nanna	
Carrie's War	2004	Mrs Gotobed	TV film
Vanity Fair	2004	Lady Southdown	
The Lazarus Child	2004	Janet	
Wallace & Gromit: The Curse of the Were-Rabbit	2005	Miss Thripp	Voice
A Matter of Loaf and Death	2008	Miss Thripp	Voice, Uncredited
Arrietty	2010	Haru	Voice, UK English dub (final film role)

=== Miss Marple in Marple: 2004–2008 ===
Name	Year
Marple: The Body in the Library	2004
Marple: The Murder at the Vicarage	2004
Marple: 4:50 from Paddington	2004
Marple: A Murder Is Announced	2005
Marple: Sleeping Murder	2005
Marple: The Moving Finger	2006
Marple: By the Pricking of My Thumbs	2006
Marple: The Sittaford Mystery	2006
Marple: At Bertram's Hotel	2007
Marple: Ordeal by Innocence	2007
Marple: Towards Zero	2008
Marple: Nemesis	2008

== Awards and nominations ==
Year	Award	Work	Result
1976	Olivier Award for Best Comedy Performance	Oh Coward!	Nominated
1976	Olivier Award for Best Actress in a Revival	On Approval	Nominated
1978	Olivier Award for Best Comedy Performance	Look After Lulu!	Nominated
1980	Olivier Award for Best Actress in a Revival	The Browning Version / Harlequinade	Nominated
1983	Evening Standard Award for Best Actress	The Rivals	Won
1991	BAFTA TV Award for Best Actress	Oranges Are Not the Only Fruit	Won
1995	Evening Standard Award for Best Actress	The Way of the World	Won
1996	Olivier Award for Best Performance in a Supporting Role	The Way of the World	Nominated
1998	Tony Award for Best Actress in a Play	The Chairs	Nominated
