= Prunella Scales =

English actress (1932–2025)

Prunella Scales CBE
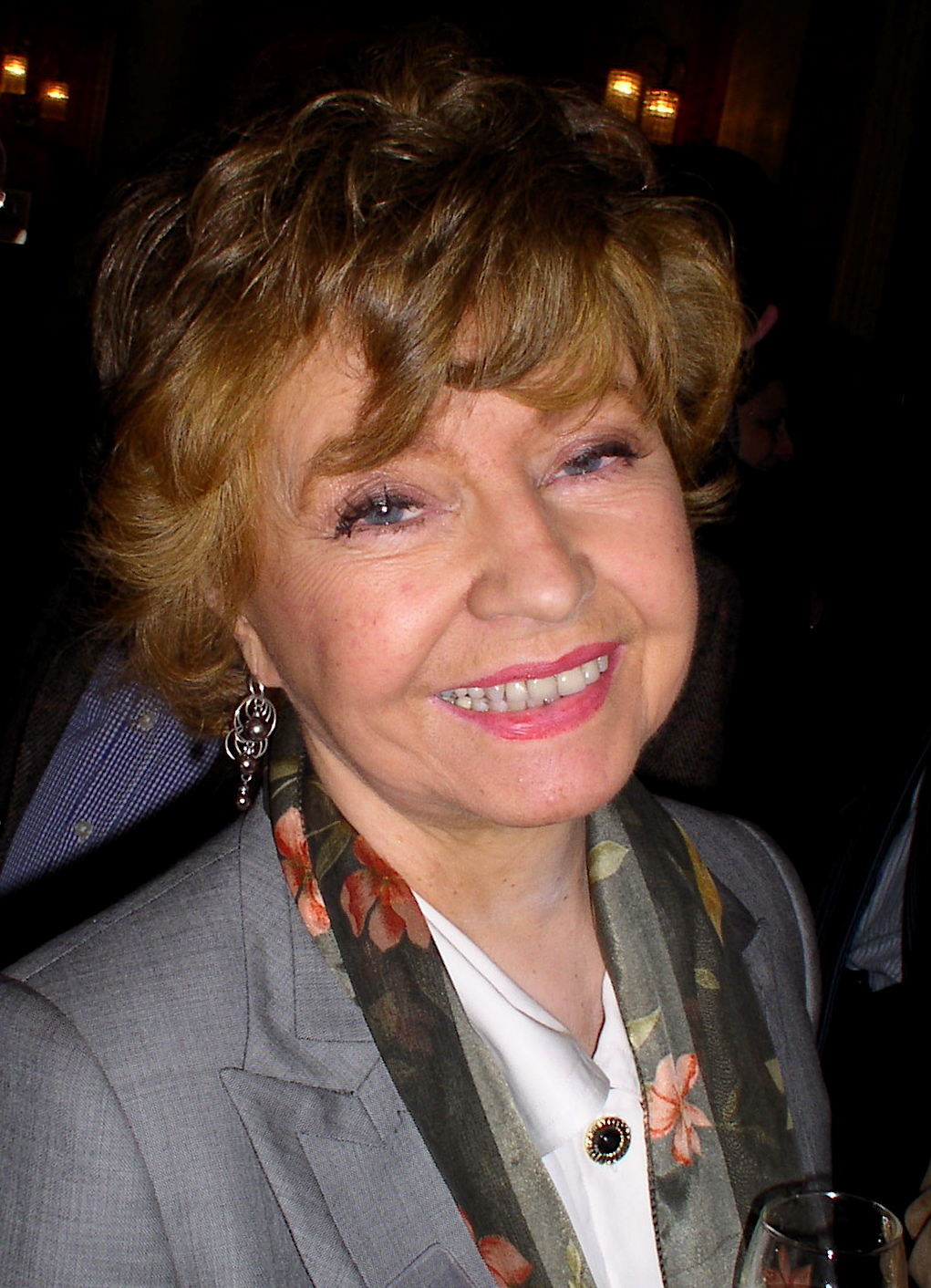
- Scales in 2010
- Born: Prunella Margaret Rumney Illingworth; 22 June 1932; Sutton Abinger, Surrey, England
- Died: 27 October 2025 (aged 93); London, England
- Education: Moira House School; Old Vic Theatre School
- Occupation: Actress
- Years active: 1952–2023
- Television: Fawlty Towers; A Question of Attribution; Great Canal Journeys; After Henry
- Spouse: Timothy West (m. 1963; died 2024)
- Children: 2, including Samuel West

Prunella Margaret Rumney West (née Illingworth; 22 June 1932 – 27 October 2025), known professionally as Prunella Scales, was an English actress. She is best known for her portrayal of Sybil Fawlty in the BBC television sitcom Fawlty Towers (1975–1979) and her performance as Queen Elizabeth II in Alan Bennett's A Question of Attribution (1991), which earned her a BAFTA nomination. She later appeared in the TV documentary series Great Canal Journeys (2014–2019), travelling waterways in the UK and abroad with her husband, the actor Timothy West.

== Early life and education ==
Prunella Margaret Rumney Illingworth was born on 22 June 1932 in Sutton Abinger, Surrey, the daughter of John Richardson Illingworth, a cotton salesman at Tootal who served as a lieutenant with the Wiltshire Regiment in the First World War, and with the Auxiliary Military Pioneer Corps in the Second World War, and Catherine, née Scales, known as "Bim", an actress who had for a time attended the Royal Academy of Dramatic Art and was later with the Liverpool Playhouse's Repertory Company. Illingworth had a younger brother, Timothy "Timmo" Illingworth (1934–2017), who became a lieutenant colonel in the Royal Irish Rangers and was appointed an OBE in the 1984 New Year Honours.

In 1939, at the start of the Second World War, Illingworth's family moved to Bucks Mills near Bideford in Devon. In 1942, Illingworth was awarded a scholarship to Moira House School, which had been evacuated from Eastbourne to a hotel on Windermere in the Lake District; her mother and brother accompanied her. She carried on her schooling when Moira House School returned to Eastbourne.

Illingworth did well at school and was encouraged to apply to Oxbridge but had become interested in acting as she was able to play people "much more interesting than I am, who say things infinitely more intelligent than anything I can think of myself". She was awarded a scholarship for the two-year course at the Old Vic Theatre School in 1949. She then started using her mother's maiden name, Scales, as a stage name.

== Career ==
=== Early work and career break ===
Scales started her career in 1951 as an assistant stage manager at the Bristol Old Vic, but stated that she had always wanted to be an actress. Throughout her career, she was often cast in comic roles. Her early work included the (believed now to be lost) second UK adaptation of Pride and Prejudice (1952), Laxdale Hall (1953), Hobson's Choice (1954), The Matchmaker in the West End and on Broadway (1954-55), Room at the Top (1958) and Waltz of the Toreadors (1962).

Scales's career break came with the early 1960s sitcom Marriage Lines starring opposite Richard Briers. In 1973, she was cast with Ronnie Barker in One Man's Meat, which formed part of Barker's Seven of One series for the BBC. She played her most famous role, Sybil Fawlty, in the sitcom Fawlty Towers over two series in 1975 and 1979. John Cleese said in an interview that the role of Sybil Fawlty was originally offered to Bridget Turner, who turned down the part. In addition to this, she had roles in BBC Radio 4 sitcoms and comedy series including After Henry, Smelling of Roses and Ladies of Letters; on television she starred in the London Weekend Television/Channel 4 series Mapp & Lucia based on the novels by E. F. Benson.

Scales's later film appearances include Escape from the Dark (1976), The Hound of the Baskervilles (1978), The Boys From Brazil (1978), The Wicked Lady (1983), The Lonely Passion of Judith Hearne (1987), Consuming Passions (1988), A Chorus of Disapproval (1989), Howards End (1992), Wolf (1994), An Awfully Big Adventure (1995) and Stiff Upper Lips (1997). For the BBC Television Shakespeare production of The Merry Wives of Windsor (1982) she played Mistress Page and in the Theatre Night series (BBC) she appeared with her husband Timothy West in the Joe Orton farce What the Butler Saw (1987) playing Mrs Prentice.

=== 1990s and onwards ===
In the early 1990s, Scales returned to the world of Mapp & Lucia, recording an unabridged audiobook adaptation of Miss Mapp (1990), Mapp and Lucia (1990) and Lucia's Progress (1992) for ISIS Audio Books, winning an AudioFile Earphones Award for the latter recording. They were later re-released in 2024.

In 1992, Scales appeared on BBC Radio 4's Desert Island Discs, a programme where guests are asked to decide which one book, luxury item, and eight audio recordings they would want with them should they be stranded on a deserted island. Her chosen books were the Complete Works of Shakespeare in German, the Bible in Russian and a Russian dictionary; her luxury item was "a huge tapestry kit".

For 10 years, Scales appeared as "Dotty" Turnbull, together with Jane Horrocks as her character's daughter, Kate Neall, in advertisements for UK supermarket chain Tesco. She played Queen Elizabeth II in Alan Bennett's A Question of Attribution (1991). In 1996, Scales starred in the television film Lord of Misrule, alongside Richard Wilson, Emily Mortimer and Stephen Moyer. The film was directed by Guy Jenkins and filming took place in Fowey in Cornwall. The same year, she appeared as Miss Bates in Emma, a TV-movie adaptation of Jane Austen's novel of the same name. In 1997, Scales starred in Chris Barfoot's science-fiction film short Phoenix which was first aired in 1999 by NBCUniversal's Sci-Fi Channel. Scales played The Client, an evil government minister funding inter-genetic time travel experiments. The same year, she played Minny Stinkler in the comedy film Mad Cows, directed by Sara Sugarman. In 1994, Scales voiced Mrs Tiggy-Winkle in The World of Peter Rabbit and Friends.

In 2000, Scales appeared in the film The Ghost of Greville Lodge. The same year, she appeared as Eleanor Bunsall in Midsomer Murders' "Beyond the Grave". In 2001, she appeared in two episodes of Silent Witness' "Faith" as Mrs Parker. In 2003, she appeared as Hilda, "she who must be obeyed", wife of Horace Rumpole, in four BBC Radio 4 plays, with Timothy West playing her fictional husband. Scales and West toured Australia at the same time in different productions. Scales appeared in a one-woman show called An Evening with Queen Victoria, which also featured the tenor Ian Partridge singing songs written by Prince Albert. Scales performed An Evening with Queen Victoria more than 400 times, in theatres around the world, over the course of 30 years.. In 2003 BBC TV showed Looking for Victoria where Scales researched Victoria's life, appearing in historical reconstructions and reading from her private journals. In 2023 Scales recorded Queen Victoria's words for a new production, called Queen, at Edinburgh Festival Fringe in 2024.

Scales voiced the speaking ("cawing") role of Magpie, the eponymous thief in a 2003 recording of Gioachino Rossini's opera La gazza ladra (The Thieving Magpie). In 2003, she played Elizabeth II in the film Johnny English.

In January 2006, Scales was the guest in Private Passions, the long-running biographical music discussion programme on BBC Radio 3.

In 2006, Scales appeared in the television adaptation of The Shell Seekers, alongside Vanessa Redgrave and Maximilian Schell.

=== Later years ===
On 16 November 2007, Scales appeared in Children in Need, reprising her role as Sybil Fawlty, the new manager who wants to take over Hotel Babylon.

Scales appeared in the audio play The Youth of Old Age, produced in 2008 by the Wireless Theatre Company, and available to download free of charge on their website. In 2008, she appeared in Agatha Christie's Miss Marple "A Pocket Full of Rye".

Scales appeared in a production of Carrie's War, the Nina Bawden novel, at the West End Apollo Theatre in 2009. The run was successful despite middling reviews. However, Ben Bradley, writing for The New York Times Arts & Beats, stated that Scales was the most memorable thing about the show, "[playing] a rich, Miss Havisham-like eccentric, who trails through her house in evening gowns".

Scales starred in the 2011 British live-action 3D family comedy film Horrid Henry: The Movie as the titular character's Great Aunt Greta. She appeared in a short audio story, Dandruff Hits the Turtleneck, written by John Mayfield, and available for download. Scales starred in a short film called "Stranger Danger" alongside Roderick Cowie in 2012. In 2013 she made a guest appearance in the popular BBC radio comedy Cabin Pressure as Wendy Crieff, the mother of Captain Martin Crieff.

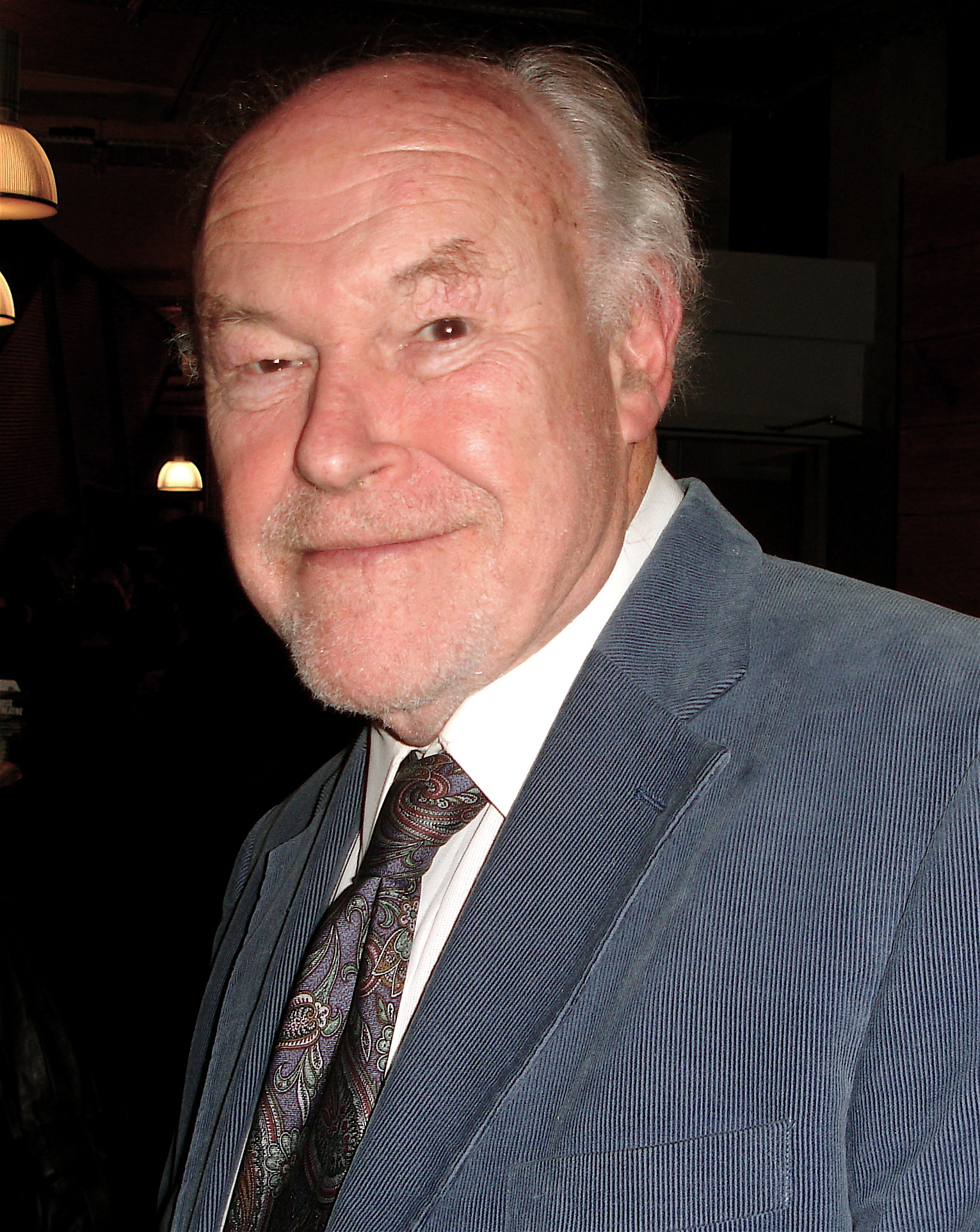
Scales and her husband, the actor Timothy West, travelled together on narrowboats for the documentary series Great Canal Journeys.

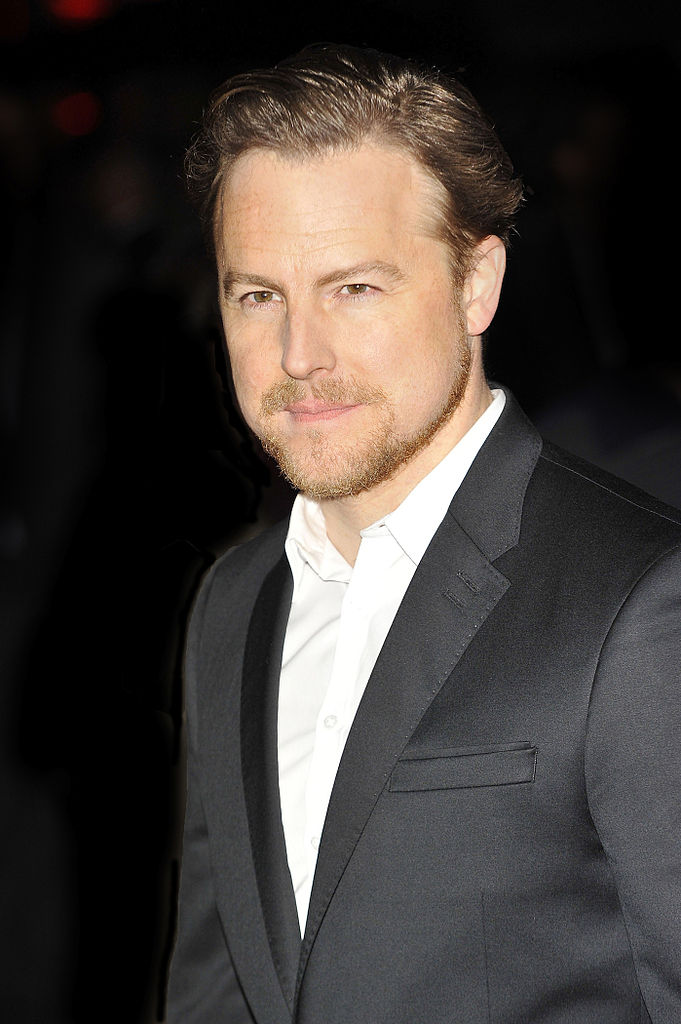
Actor Samuel West, the son of Scales and Timothy West, played Siegfried Farnon in the 2020 remake of the veterinary drama series All Creatures Great and Small.

Alongside her husband, Scales appeared in Great Canal Journeys for Channel 4 from 2014 for 10 series, before her deteriorating health brought her television career to an end. Stuart Heritage, writing for The Guardian in November 2016, commented that it "is ultimately a work about a devoted couple facing something huge together. It's a beautiful, meditative programme." "An emotional but unrooted glimpse of life with dementia" was Christopher Howse's characterization in October 2018, writing for The Telegraph. Reviewing Scales's and West's last episode in October 2019 for The Guardian, Jack Seale wrote "Since the first instalment in 2014, the series has charted the long, slow goodbye that is living with dementia, cherishing every moment of precious normality and celebrating how an immersion in nature is the surest way to bring the old Pru back."

== Personal life ==
Scales was married to the actor Timothy West from 1963 until his death in 2024. Their marriage produced two sons; the elder is the actor and director Samuel West. Scales also had a step-daughter by West's first marriage. Scales and West shared a common hobby of narrowboating. In 2013, Scales declared that while she was famous for 'playing unfortunate wives', she was herself a 'very lucky wife'.

Her biography, Prunella, written by Teresa Ransom, was published by UK publishing imprint John Murray in 2005.

In 2005, she named the P&O cruise ship Artemis.

Scales was a patron of the Lace Market Theatre in Nottingham, and Inter-Action's Fun Art Bus (set up by E.D. Berman). She and her husband were also patrons of BeyondAutism.

From 1997 until 2002, she was president of CPRE, at that time known as the Council for the Protection of Rural England.

=== Political views ===
Scales was a member of the Labour Party and supported the Campaign for Nuclear Disarmament, the Anti-Apartheid Movement, the Anti-Nazi League, and the women of mining communities.

=== Illness and death ===
Scales's husband first noticed signs of her memory difficulties in 2001 while she was performing at the Greenwich Theatre. She was eventually diagnosed with vascular dementia in 2013. In 2015, West said in an interview: "The sad thing is that you just watch the gradual disappearance of the person that you knew and loved and were very close to." The diagnosis did not prevent her from taking part in Great Canal Journeys, in which she and her husband spoke openly about her illness. Her declining health led the couple to leave the series in 2019. Interviewed for the BBC in 2023, soon after celebrating their diamond wedding anniversary, West said, with reference to Scales's dementia: "Somehow we have coped with it and Pru doesn't really think about it."

Scales died at her home in London on 27 October 2025 aged 93. Tributes followed from across the entertainment industry and beyond: John Cleese, who played her onscreen husband in Fawlty Towers, and on whose 86th birthday she died, praised her as "a really wonderful comic actress". According to her sons, she had been watching the sitcom the day before her death. BBC comedy director Jon Petrie called her "a national treasure". Broadcaster Gyles Brandreth remembered her as "a funny, intelligent, gifted human being", and the Alzheimer's Society commended her openness about living with dementia, describing her as "an inspiration". On 28 October, the day Scales's death was publicly announced, BBC One rebroadcast the Fawlty Towers episode "The Builders"; the episode ended with a dedication to her memory.

== Honours and nominations ==
Scales was appointed a Commander of the Order of the British Empire in the 1992 Birthday Honours List.

In 1999, Scales was awarded the Freedom of the City of London and an honorary Doctor of Letters (D.Litt.) degree by the University of Bradford. The following year, she received a second honorary D.Litt. from the University of East Anglia.

A rose-breeder created a rose, Prunella, in her honour.

Scales was nominated for a British Academy Television Award for Best Actress for A Question of Attribution (1991). She also received two Laurence Olivier Award nominations, for Make and Break (1980) and Single Spies (1990).

== Filmography ==
=== Film ===
Year	Title	Role	Notes
1953	Laxdale Hall	Morag McLeod	
1954	Hobson's Choice	Vicky Hobson	
1954	What Every Woman Wants	Mary	
1954	The Crowded Day	Customer	
1958	Blind Spot	Petrol pump attendant	
1958	Room at the Top	Council office worker	Uncredited
1962	Waltz of the Toreadors	Estella Fitzjohn	
1976	The Littlest Horse Thieves	Mrs. Sandman	
1978	The Hound of the Baskervilles	Glynis	
1978	The Boys from Brazil	Mrs. Harrington	
1983	The Wicked Lady	Lady Kingsclere	
1987	The Lonely Passion of Judith Hearne	Moira O'Neill	
1988	Consuming Passions	Ethel	
1989	A Chorus of Disapproval	Hannah Ap Llewelyn	
1992	Howards End	Aunt Juley	
1992	Freddie as F.R.O.7	Queen	Voice
1994	Wolf	Maude	
1994	Second Best	Margery	
1995	An Awfully Big Adventure	Rose	
1997	Stiff Upper Lips	Aunt Agnes	
1999	Mad Cows	Dr. Minnie Stinkler	
1999	An Ideal Husband	Lady Markby	
2000	The Ghost of Greville Lodge	Sarah	
2003	Johnny English	The Queen	Uncredited
2011	Horrid Henry: The Movie	Great Aunt Greta	
2012	Run for Your Wife	Woman at pub	Cameo

Non-profit organization positions
Preceded by Jonathan Dimbleby	President of the Campaign to Protect Rural England; 1997–2002	Succeeded by Sir Max Hastings
