= Barbara Jefford =

British actress (1930–2020)

Barbara Jefford OBE
- Born: Barbara Mary Jefford; 26 July 1930; Plymstock, Devon, England
- Died: 12 September 2020 (aged 90); Mousehole, Cornwall, England
- Occupation: Actress
- Years active: 1946–2013
- Spouses: Terence Longdon (m. 1953; div. 1961); John Turner (m. 1967)

Barbara Mary Jefford (26 July 1930 – 12 September 2020) was a British actress, best known for her theatrical performances with the Royal Shakespeare Company, the Old Vic and the National Theatre and her role as Molly Bloom in the 1967 film of James Joyce's Ulysses. For Ulysses, Jefford was nominated for the BAFTA Award for Best British Actress. She was also Olivier nominated in 1991 for playing Volumnia in Coriolanus at the Barbican.

== Early life ==
Mary Barbara Jefford was born in Plymstock, Devon, the daughter of Elizabeth Mary Ellen (née Laity) and Percival Francis Jefford. She was brought up primarily in Somerset, and attended Weirfield School in Taunton. She attended the Hartly-Hodder School of Speech Training and Dramatic Art before training at the Royal Academy of Dramatic Art in London, where she was awarded the Bancroft Gold Medal. In 1946, whilst still a student, she obtained small parts in the radio production of Westward Ho! and other radio plays, but her stage debut came in 1949, when she played the part of Viola in Twelfth Night at the Dolphin Theatre, Brighton.

== Career ==
=== Theatre ===
==== Stratford ====
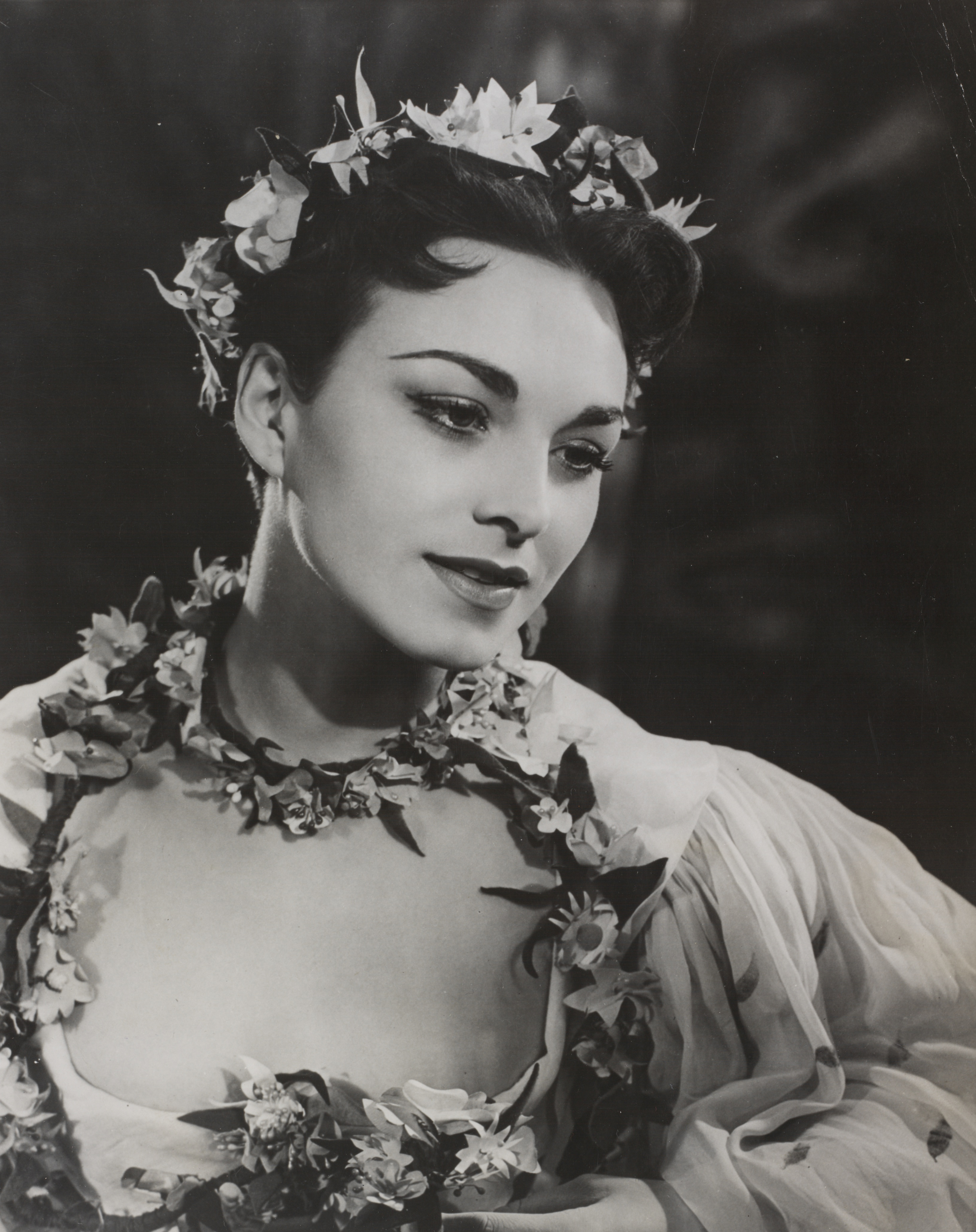
Portrait of Barbara Jefford as Rosalind in Shakespeare's 'As You Like It', Sydney, 1953

After spending just one year working in repertory theatre she was given the part of Isabella in 1950 in Peter Brook's production of Measure for Measure at the Shakespeare Memorial Theatre, (later the base of the Royal Shakespeare Company) in Stratford-upon-Avon, playing opposite John Gielgud (Angelo) and Harry Andrews (Vincentio).

Over the next four years she played many more major Shakespearean roles: Anne Boleyn in Henry VIII in 1950; Calpurnia in Julius Caesar opposite Anthony Quayle and Michael Langham in 1950; Hero, opposite John Gielgud and Peggy Ashcroft in 1950; Lady Percy in Henry IV, opposite John Kidd, Anthony Quayle and Michael Redgrave in 1951; Isabel opposite Richard Burton in Henry V, in 1951; Desdemona to Anthony Quayle's Othello in 1952; Rosalind in As You Like It (New Zealand Tour, 1953); Lady Percy in Henry IV, Part 1 ( New Zealand Tour and International Tour, 1953); Hippolyta in A Midsummer Night's Dream in 1954; Kate to Keith Michell's Petruchio in The Taming of the Shrew in 1954; and Helen in Troilus and Cressida in 1954.

==== The Old Vic ====
After leaving Stratford she co-starred with Michael Redgrave in Tiger at the Gates in the West End and on Broadway, before returning to work at the Old Vic. Amongst other roles she played there were Portia in The Merchant of Venice; Imogen in Cymbeline; Beatrice in Much Ado About Nothing; Julia in The Two Gentlemen of Verona; Tamora in Titus Andronicus; Lady Anne in Richard III; Viola in Twelfth Night; Queen Margaret in Henry VI 1–3; Isabella in Measure for Measure; Regan in King Lear; Rosalind in As You Like It; and Viola in Twelfth Night. In 1978 she played Gertrude to Derek Jacobi's Hamlet.

She also played Gwendoline in The Importance of Being Earnest, Beatrice in Shelley's The Cenci and Joan in George Bernard Shaw's Saint Joan, emulating her mentor and friend, Dame Sybil Thorndike. Many of these productions toured the United States, the USSR, the Middle East and Europe.

==== Other productions ====
Jefford entered a period of acting with Frank Hauser's Oxford Playhouse which included the first of her three Cleopatras, Racine's Phèdre and Lina in Misalliance which transferred to the Criterion Theatre. In the early 1970s she played Katherine Stockman in Ibsen's An Enemy of the People at the Chichester Theatre Festival.

Other West End productions included Ride A Cock Horse, Filumena, Mistress of Novices and The Dark Horse, as well as the Almeida Theatre's Racine Season at the Albery Theatre. With this company she also played her second Volumnia in Coriolanus, opposite Ralph Fiennes in London, New York City and Tokyo, her first being at Stratford with Charles Dance. In 1976 she was in the opening production at the Olivier Theatre playing Zabina in Tamburlaine the Great with Albert Finney.

She repeated many Shakespearean roles in her long career, appearing in 54 productions of all but four of his plays. The last of these was Michael Grandage's Richard III with Kenneth Branagh in 2002, at the Crucible Theatre, Sheffield in which she played Queen Margaret.

In July 2007, she played Mrs Higgins (the mother of Henry Higgins) in Peter Hall's acclaimed Theatre Royal, Bath production of George Bernard Shaw's Pygmalion, which transferred to the Old Vic in May 2008.

=== Film and television ===
In 1959, she appeared as Ophelia in a TV production of Hamlet. For the James Bond film From Russia with Love (1963) she provided the uncredited voice of Tatiana Romanova, played by Daniela Bianchi. Jefford provided additional voice work in later Bond films, dubbing Molly Peters in Thunderball (1965) and Caroline Munro in The Spy Who Loved Me (1977). Her first major film role was as Molly Bloom in Ulysses (1967), for which she was nominated for a British Academy Award. This was followed by A Midsummer Night's Dream (1968), The Bofors Gun (1968), The Shoes of the Fisherman (1968) and Lust for a Vampire (1971). She played Magda Goebbels in Hitler: The Last Ten Days (1973). Other films include Nelly's Version (1983), Fellini's And the Ship Sails On (E la nave va) (1983), Claudia (1985), When the Whales Came (1989), The Saint, Roman Polanski's The Ninth Gate (1999) and Terence Davies's The Deep Blue Sea. In 2013, she played Sister Hildegard, a small but crucial part, in Stephen Frears's Philomena with Judi Dench and Steve Coogan.

Jefford appeared in several television dramas in the Play For Today series (Edna, the Inebriate Woman, 1971); and in several other series. These include Journey to the Unknown, which also aired in the US, in 1968; Walter and June (1986); Porterhouse Blue (1987); Mrs Herriton in Where Angels Fear to Tread (Charles Sturridge, 1991); The House of Eliott (1991); Midsomer Murders (2000, 2009) and Madame Bovary (2000). She has also appeared in episodes of The Ruth Rendell Mysteries, Campion and the Inspector Alleyn Mysteries. She also appeared in "The Creeper", a 2010 episode of Midsomer Murders.

=== Radio ===
Selected radio roles included:

- Isabella in Shakespeare's Measure for Measure, BBC Home Service 23 April 1950.
- Thomas Otway's Venice Preserved, BBC Third Programme 10 August 1960; with Donald Wolfit.
- Goneril in Shakespeare's King Lear, BBC Third Programme 29 September 1967; with John Gielgud and Howard Marion-Crawford.
- Maja Rubek in When We Dead Awaken by Henrik Ibsen, BBC Third Programme 3 August 1969; with Ralph Richardson, Irene Worth and Gordon Jackson .
- Tamora in Shakespeare's Titus Andronicus, BBC Radio 3 28 October 1973.
- Sibylla in The Holy Sinner, by Peter Redgrove, based on the novel by Thomas Mann, BBC Radio 3, 18 November 1975.
- Duchess of Gloucester in episodes 5 and 6 of Vivat Rex, BBC Radio 3 1977.
- Cleopatra in Shakespeare's Antony and Cleopatra, BBC Radio 4 2 May 1981.
- Millie Crocker-Harris in The Browning Version by Terence Rattigan, BBC Radio 4 Afternoon Play 26 June 1981; with Nigel Stock.
- Miss Lavish in A Room with a View by E M Forster, BBC Radio 4, 1995
- Eleanor of Aquitaine in The Lion in Winter by James Goldman, BBC Radio 4 27 December 1981.
- Paulina in Shakespeare's The Winter's Tale, BBC Radio 3 21 January 1982.
- Elspeth Graham in The Killing of Mr Toad, by David Gooderson, BBC Radio 4, 30 December 1984.
- Lucia in Queen Lucia and Lucia in London, adapted by Aubrey Woods from E F Benson's Lucia books, BBC Radio 4 1984 and 1985.
- Queen Elizabeth I in Friedrich von Schiller Mary Stuart, BBC Radio 4 30 November 1987; with Hannah Gordon.
- Maria Lvovna Dzerzinskaya in The Stalin Sonata by David Zane Mairowitz, BBC Radio 4 1 August 1989; Giles Cooper Award Winner.
- A Winter Meeting by Elaine Feinstein, BBC Radio 4 14 January 1995.
- On This Shaven Green by Don Taylor, BBC Radio 4 16 September 2003. With John Wood, Edward Petherbridge.

== Personal life and death ==
In 1953, Jefford married actor Terence Longdon; the marriage was dissolved in 1961. In 1967, she married actor John Turner.

Jefford died from oesophageal cancer at her home in Mousehole, Cornwall, on 12 September 2020.

== Honours and awards ==
In 1965, Jefford was awarded the Officer of Order of the British Empire for her service to the theatre, becoming the youngest civilian recipient of the award to that date.

In 1977 she was also awarded the Jubilee Festival Medal.
