= Chunky Monkey =

Chunky Monkey may refer to:

- a flavor of Ben & Jerry's ice cream
- Chunky Monkey (film), written and directed by Greg Cruttwell, 2000

== See also ==
- Obesity
