= George and Margaret (film) =

- Judy Kelly in a scene from the film.
- Directed by: George King
- Written by: Rodney Ackland; Brock Williams
- Based on: George and Margaret by Gerald Savory
- Starring: Marie Lohr; Judy Kelly; Noel Howlett
- Cinematography: Basil Emmott
- Edited by: Terence Fisher
- Music by: Bretton Byrd
- Production company: Warner Brothers
- Distributed by: Warner Brothers
- Release date: 30 November 1940
- Running time: 74 minutes
- Country: United Kingdom
- Language: English
- Budget: £37,976
- Box office: £34,695

George and Margaret is a 1940 British comedy film directed by George King and starring Marie Lohr, Judy Kelly and Noel Howlett. It was written by Rodney Ackland and Brock Williams based on the play of the same name by Gerald Savory.

== Synopsis ==
The plot revolves around the sudden and unexpected visit for dinner of George and Margaret, a couple returning from British India to visit their upper-middle class friends in Hampstead. Their unanticipated arrival plunges the house into chaos, with the domineering and snobbish mother, absent-minded father, high-spirited adult children and the put-upon servants all at odds. While most of them resent having to play host to the unlikable George and Margaret in order to please their mother's vanity, the couple's arrival and the confusion it causes serve as a catalyst for the resolution of various problems in their lives. Heading for a happy ending, George and Margaret finally arrive for dinner, only for the house to be plunged into darkness due to a short circuit.

== Cast ==
- Marie Lohr as Alice
- Judy Kelly as Frankie
- Noel Howlett as Malcolm
- Oliver Wakefield as Roger
- John Boxer as Claude
- Ann Casson as Gladys
- Arthur Macrae as Dudley
- Margaret Yarde as Cook
- Irene Handl as Beer
- Gus McNaughton as Wolverton

== Production ==
The film was made at Teddington Studios by the British subsidiary of Warner Brothers, with sets designed by art director Norman G. Arnold.

== Reception ==
According to Kinematograph Weekly the film was "a good outsider" at the British box office in December 1940.

The Monthly Film Bulletin wrote: "This clever, witty and delightful comedy loses nothing by its translation to the screen. The direction is straightforward and manages to capture the atmosphere of the agitated home perfectly, yet the film is in no sense merely a photographed play. Marie Lohr heads an excellent cast as the mother and the rest of the players support her nobly."

Variety wrote: "It is Marie Lohr's picture, actress playing the Mrs. Alice Garth-Bander role for every chuckle it holds. From her expressively fluttering hands drops all the anguish she experiences in her efforts to rally the family into being nice to these old friends, George and Margaret. ... George King directed his players into taking the comedy very seriously. As film stands on its nonsense value, perhaps a broader effect might have been obtained by treating some of the roles for the farcical elements they basically contain, setting this against the necessary serious playing of Miss Lohr."
