= George and Margaret =

1937 comedy play by Gerald Savory

George and Margaret is a comedy play, by British writer Gerald Savory, which was first staged in 1937. It had a very successful run in the West End, beginning at Wyndham's Theatre before transferring to the Piccadilly Theatre, lasting for over seven hundred performances. The cast was headed by Nigel Patrick, Jane Baxter, Ann Casson and Joyce Barbour. The New Statesman critic singled out Irene Handl's brief appearance as a maid as a highlight.

The new monarch George VI and his wife Elizabeth attended a performance of the show. Following its London success, Noël Coward directed the work for its transfer to Broadway.

== Plot ==
The play portrays a day in the lives of a middle-class London family and their servants. They are thrown into chaos by the suddenly announced arrival of their old friends George and Margaret for dinner that evening. The snobbish and domineering mother forces all family members to attend, despite the resentment of her children. However, the anticipated arrival eventually provides a catalyst for various members of the family to resolve their personal crises. The play ends without the title characters George and Margaret ever having appeared on stage.

== Film adaptation ==
The play was adapted to film in 1940. It was made at Teddington Studios by the British branch of Warner Brothers. Several of the original stage cast appeared in the production.

== Bibliography ==
- Goble, Alan. The Complete Index to Literary Sources in Film. Walter de Gruyter, 1999.
- Hoare, Philip. Noel Coward: A Biography of Noel Coward. Simon & Schuster, 2013.
- Wearing, J.P. The London Stage 1940-1949: A Calendar of Productions, Performers, and Personnel. Rowman & Littlefield, 2014.
