= Teo Savory =

American novelist

- Born: Elizabeth Bullis Dunbar; December 27, 1907
- Died: November 14, 1989 (aged 81); Greensboro, North Carolina, U.S.
- Occupations: Writer, publisher
- Notable work: The Single Secret; A Penny for his Pocket; Stonecrop
- Spouses: Michael Gurney Hoare (divorced); Gerald Savory (divorced); Alan Brilliant (1958–1989; her death)

Teo Savory /ˈteɪoʊ/ (December 27, 1907 – November 14, 1989) was an American novelist, poet, translator, and publisher.

== Early life ==
Sources indicate that Teo Savory was born Elizabeth Bullis Dunbar in 1907, the daughter of Lambert Dunbar (1879–1965) and Elsie Lyons (1883–1949). Lambert Dunbar was a flour merchant from Portland, Oregon, who emigrated to Hong Kong early in the 20th century to manage a family business there. While Savory later claimed to have been born in Hong Kong, other sources give her birthplace as Portland, Oregon, and indicate that the Dunbar family did not move from the U.S. to Hong Kong until 1915.

Her first marriage (to Michael Gurney Hoare in Hong Kong in 1929) ended in divorce. According to later newspaper interviews, she attended the Royal College of Music in London and was involved in musical comedy theater while living in England.

After returning to the U.S., she married expatriate British playwright Gerald Savory in 1938. In the 1940 U.S. Census, she was listed as Teo Savory. Although her marriage to Savory also ended in divorce, she retained this professional name for her literary career. In the 1940s and 1950s she was an executive secretary and publicist for New York's American National Theatre and Academy and the Woodstock Playhouse, and established an agency that handled television scripts.

== Writing and publishing career ==
Savory published her first stories, "Eat Dusty Bread" and "Before This, In Dreams" in 1947–1948. In 1956, (Note: Primary sources indicate 1958.) she married American writer Alan Brilliant (1936–2022), with whom she founded Unicorn Press, a small publishing house, in 1966.

Her debut novel, The Landscape of Dreams (1960), a semi-autobiographical story of a girl raised in China and the United States, was described in Kirkus Reviews as "a sensitive first novel." Her 1961 book The Single Secret, a narrative of a female mental patient and her physician, was praised in The New York Times as "a remarkable novel" and the work of "an exceptionally skilled and perceptive novelist." Stonecrop, her 1977 novel describing life in a small town in Massachusetts, won a Massachusetts Council on the Arts & Humanities Award.

Savory also published many English translations of French and German writers and poets, including Jacques Prévert, Guillevic, and Günter Eich.

She died of lung cancer in Greensboro, North Carolina, in 1989.

== Partial bibliography ==
=== Novels ===
- The Landscape of Dreams (1960)
- The Single Secret (1961)
- A Penny for his Pocket (1963) (UK title: A Penny for the Guy)
- To a High Place (1972)
- Stonecrop: The Country I Remember (1977)
- To Raise a Rainbow (1980)

=== Short fiction ===
- A Clutch of Fables (1977)
- A Childhood (1978)
- West to East: Tales of the Twenties & Thirties (1989)

=== Poetry ===
- Traveler's Palm (1967)
- Snow Vole (1968)
- Transitions (1973)
- Dragons of Mist and Torrent (1974)
