= Lamb House =

Writer's house museum in Rye, East Sussex, England

Coordinates: 50.9499°N 0.7327°E

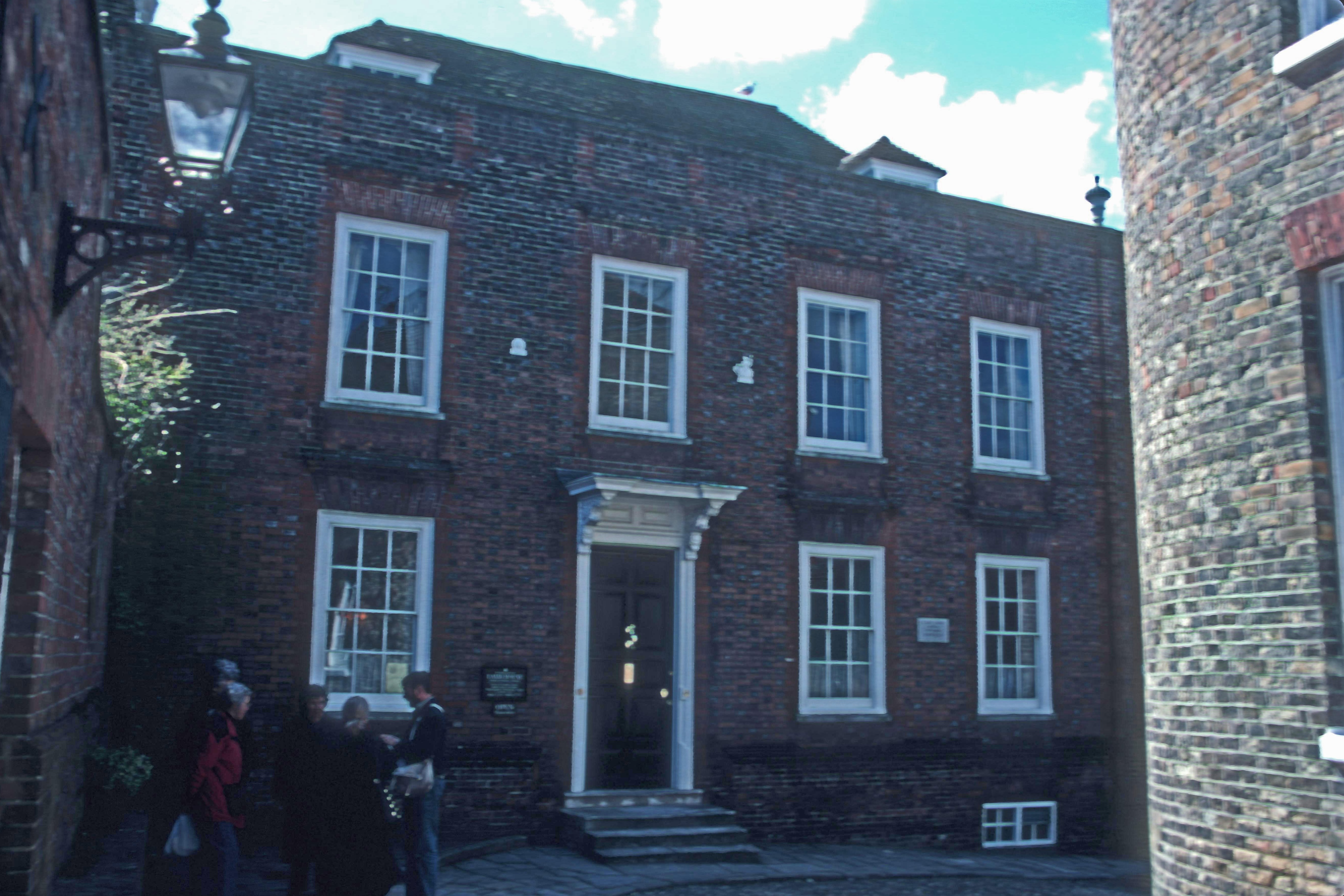
Lamb House

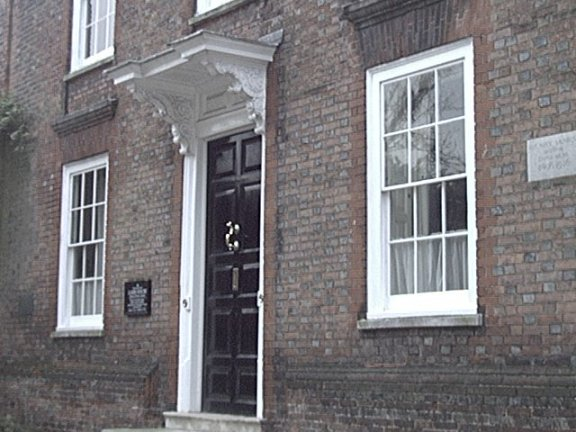
Entrance

Lamb House is a Grade II* listed 18th-century house situated in Rye, East Sussex, England, and in the ownership of the National Trust.

The house is run as a writer's house museum. It has been the home of many writers, including Henry James from 1897 to 1914, E. F. Benson, and Rumer Godden from 1968 to 1973.

== History and setting for books ==
Lamb House was built in 1722 by James Lamb, a wealthy wine merchant and local politician. In the winter of 1726 King George I took refuge at the house after his ship was washed ashore at nearby Camber Sands. James Lamb gave up his bedroom for the King, while Mrs Lamb gave birth to a baby boy during the night. The child was named George and the king consented to be the boy's godfather.

A detached Garden Room, with a large bay window overlooking the street, was built at right angles to the house in 1743, and originally served as a banqueting room. Both Henry James and E. F. Benson later used the Garden Room as a base for their writing during the summer months. The Garden Room was destroyed by a German bomb in 1940.

Benson wrote lovingly of both the garden and house, which he renamed "Mallards", in his popular Mapp and Lucia novels. Lamb House is the subject of Joan Aiken's supernatural book The Haunting of Lamb House (1993), comprising three novellas about residents of the house at different times, including James and Benson (both of whom also wrote ghost stories).

Other tenants have included the novelist Rumer Godden, the author and academic A. C. Benson, the author and politician H. Montgomery Hyde, the artist and publisher Sir Brian Batsford, politician William Mabane, 1st Baron Mabane, the literary agent Graham Watson, the actor Dominic Rowan and his family, and the writers John Senior and Sarah Philo.

== National Trust ==
In 1950 the widow of Henry James's nephew gave Lamb House to the National Trust. Some of James's personal possessions are on display, and there is an extensive walled garden, designed by Alfred Parsons at the request of Henry James, which is open to the public along with the house.

In 2006 Lamb House was subject to extensive exterior refurbishment, including the application of bird control proofing measures to prevent seagulls from nesting and blocking the internal parapet drainage systems. The measures included the use of a new technique of horizontal parallel wires to prevent gulls from landing. Several sections of stonework and the copper roof were replaced. The works lasted for three months, from April to June.

As of 2018, the house will no longer be tenanted and the first floor will be open to the public for the first time.

== Filming ==
During summer 2014, Lamb House was used as the fictional "Mallards" for a BBC TV adaptation of E. F. Benson's Mapp and Lucia. A temporary replica of the Garden Room was constructed for filming. The series was broadcast on BBC1 over three nights in December 2014.
