= Crime on Our Hands =

1954 TV crime drama series

Crime on Our Hands was a British crime drama television series which aired in 1954 on the BBC. Cast included Geraldine McEwan and Jack Watling. It aired live for six half-hour episodes. The series is missing, believed lost.
