= Great Canal Journeys =

2014–2021 British television series

- Genre: Documentary
- Presented by: Timothy West; Prunella Scales; Gyles Brandreth; Sheila Hancock
- Country of origin: United Kingdom
- Original language: English
- No. of series: 12
- No. of episodes: 39

Production
- Running time: 48 minutes

Original release
- Network: Channel 4
- Release: 10 March 2014 – 22 March 2021

Great Canal Journeys is a British television series in which a pair of presenters take canal barge and narrowboat trips in the United Kingdom, Europe, India and Egypt. The series was originally aired on More4 before transferring to Channel 4 with Series 2.

The original presenters were husband and wife Timothy West and Prunella Scales. Both were keen narrowboaters and were involved in campaigning to revive the Kennet and Avon Canal. West and Scales both talk frankly about Scales' dementia during the series, which was praised by Alzheimer's Research UK.

In 2020, West and Scales were replaced by TV personality Gyles Brandreth and actor Sheila Hancock for series 11. In the first episode Timothy West gave the two novice canal boaters a crash course in narrowboating.

== Episodes ==
=== Series 1 ===
Episode Name	Original date aired	Station aired	Episode information	Viewing figure*
Kennet and Avon Canal	10 March 2014	More4	The series started with Tim and Pru celebrating their 50th wedding anniversary by travelling 21 miles along the Kennet & Avon canal from Bath to Devizes.	0.83m
The Rochdale	17 March 2014	More4	Tim and Pru start at Sowerby Bridge in West Yorkshire, travelling through Mytholmroyd to reach the summit of the canal 600 ft up the Pennines	–
The Llangollen Canal	24 March 2014	More4	Tim and Pru visit Llangollen where they spent their honeymoon. They travel through the Vale of Llangollen, the Montgomery Canal before visiting the Horseshoe Falls by horse drawn barge.	0.83m
Canal du Nivernais, France	31 March 2014	More4	Tim and Pru visit the Burgundy region of France. They travel along the Canal du Nivernais taking part in the grape harvest in Chablis before ending the trip in Auxerre.	–

- No Viewing Figure means not within BARB Top 30.

=== Series 2 ===
Episode name	Original date aired	Station aired	Episode information	Viewing figure
Oxford Canal	15 March 2015	Channel 4	Tim and Pru start in Oxford for a trip on the Oxford Canal which was the first trip they had on a canal 40 years previously. They meet Sonia Rolt, a canal campaigner and author Philip Pullman. They are joined on the journey through the Cherwell Valley by the first canal laureate Jo Bell and their son, actor Sam West.	2.55m
London Ring	22 March 2015	Channel 4	Tim and Pru start in Brentford, travelling along both the Grand Union Canal and Regent's Canal to Limehouse. On the way they met up with Andrew Sachs and Ian McKellen and visit the grave of Harold Pinter at Kensal Green Cemetery.	1.88m
Canal du Midi, France	29 March 2015	Channel 4	Tim and Pru travel along the Canal du Midi, which was built nearly 100 years before the British canals and is designated a World Heritage site. They visit the town of Béziers and travel in the Europe's first navigable canal – the Malpas Tunnel. They try lamb's brain fritters and drink 200-year-old whisky. They are joined on the journey by their son Joseph West and his family.	1.65m
Forth & Clyde and Union Canals	5 April 2015	Channel 4	Tim and Pru travel along the two Scottish canals in a coast to coast trip from Edinburgh to Glasgow. Along the way they travel Scotland's highest aqueduct and go through its longest canal tunnel. They also visit 21st-century canal technology with the Falkirk Wheel.	2.02m

=== Series 3 ===
Episode name	Original date aired	Station aired	Episode information	Viewing figure
London's Lost Route to the Sea	25 October 2015	Channel 4		1.86m
Birmingham to Braunston	1 November 2015	Channel 4		1.93m
Shannon–Erne Waterway	8 November 2015	Channel 4		1.82m

=== Series 4 ===
Episode Name	Original date aired	Station aired	Episode information	Viewing figure
The Göta Canal, Sweden	20 March 2016	Channel 4		2.22m
Stockholm and the Archipelago, Sweden	27 March 2016	Channel 4		1.5m
Stratford-upon-Avon	3 April 2016	Channel 4		1.44m

=== Series 5 ===
Episode name	Original date aired	Station aired	Episode information	Viewing figure
Venice, Italy	17 August 2016	Channel 4		1.68m
Amsterdam, Netherlands	24 August 2016	Channel 4		1.38m
Leeds and Liverpool Canal	31 August 2016	Channel 4		1.37m

=== Series 6 ===
Episode name	Original date aired	Station aired	Episode information	Viewing figure
Bristol and North Devon	23 October 2016	Channel 4		1.44m
The Caledonian	6 November 2016	Channel 4		1.75m
The Crinan Canal	13 November 2016	Channel 4		1.66m

=== Series 7 ===
Episode name	Original date aired	Station aired	Episode information	Viewing figure
Kerala, India	16 June 2017	Channel 4	Tim and Pru start their trip in Kochi, before travelling to the Kerala backwaters. They also visit the ancient fort in Tangasseri and visit Ambalappuzha Sri Krishna Temple.	1.66m
Brahmaputra, India	23 June 2017	Channel 4	Tim and Pru explore the Brahmaputra River. They follow an old tea trading route, meet a community of monks and take a ride on an elephant.	1.58m

=== Series 8 ===
Episode name	Original date aired	Station aired	Episode information	Viewing figure
Norfolk Broads	29 October 2017	Channel 4		1.51m
Marne–Rhine Canal, France	5 November 2017	Channel 4		1.42m
Rio Douro, Portugal	30 November 2017	Channel 4		1.66m
Monmouthshire and Brecon Canal	7 December 2017	Channel 4		1.56m

=== Series 9 ===
Episode name	Original date aired	Station aired	Episode information	Viewing figure*
River Nile, Egypt	7 October 2018	Channel 4		1.36m
Lake Maggiore, Naviglio Grande, Italy	14 October 2018	Channel 4		1.39m
Bridgewater Canal, Trent and Mersey Canal, Weaver Navigation, Shropshire Union Canal	28 October 2018	Channel 4		1.4m
Paraná Delta, Argentina	4 November 2018	Channel 4		1.53m
Lancaster Canal & Lake Windermere	11 November 2018	Channel 4		1.39m
Rideau Canal, Canada	18 November 2018	Channel 4		

- If viewing figure is blank then the programme was not in the weekly top 10 on BARB.

=== Series 10 ===
The series has been subtitled Asian Odyssey and is billed as Prunella Scales and Timothy West's last canal journey.

Episode name	Original date aired	Station aired	Episode information	Viewing figure*
Vietnam	9 June 2019	Channel 4	Tim and Pru start their trip in Halong Bay, before travelling along the Red River to visit both Hanoi and Hoa Lu. They also visit the ancient port town of Hoi An and take part in its famous lantern festival.	1.63m
Cambodia	16 June 2019	Channel 4	Tim and Pru start their trip in Vietnam's Mekong Delta, exploring its local customs before crossing into Cambodia. There they visit the capital city Phenom Penh before travelling onto the ancient abandoned city of Angkor Wat, where they discover how the city and the surviving temple were built with the aid of canals.	1.53m

=== Special ===
Episode name	Original date aired	Station aired	Episode information	Viewing figure
Oxford Canal	20 October 2019	Channel 4	This one-off special sees a return to the Oxford Canal where it all started, to relive past memories.	0.83m

=== Series 11 ===
Episode name	Original date aired	Station aired	Episode information	Viewing figure*
The Thames	8 November 2020	Channel 4	Gyles and Sheila are introduced to canal boating by Timothy West along the upper reaches of the Thames.	1.76m
The Lea Navigation	15 November 2020	Channel 4	Gyles and Sheila travel the Lea Navigation, visiting the former Royal Gunpowder Mills and tackling their first manual locks before travelling up the Thames.	1.69m

=== Series 12 ===
Episode name	Original date aired	Station Aired	Episode information	Viewing figure
Staffordshire's Waterways (Part 1)	15 March 2021	Channel 4	Sheila and Gyles tour Staffordshire's waterways – the Caldon and the Trent and Mersey Canals on a tour of the Potteries and Stoke-on-Trent.	
Staffordshire's Waterways (Part 2)	22 March 2021	Channel 4	Sheila and Gyles tour Staffordshire's waterways – the Caldon and the Trent and Mersey Canals on a tour of the Potteries and Stoke-on-Trent.	

== Home media ==
With the exception of the London Ring episode in series 2, all of first eight series have been issued on DVD; the series numbering, however, is different.

- Series 3 and 4 are combined and called series 3
- Series 5 and 6 are combined and called series 4
- Series 7 and 8 are combined and called series 5
