= In the Middle (film) =

British sports documentary film

Film poster

In the Middle is a 2023 British documentary written, directed and produced by Greg Cruttwell. It follows a variety of match officials who share their stories and experiences as referees in grassroots football.

== Featuring ==
- Ron Clarkson
- Steve Earl
- Lucy Clark
- Dele Sotimirin
- Nigel Owen
- Alan Halfacre
- Kian Hill
- Elle Kapitz
- Cassandra McKoy
- Ann Marie Powell.

== Production ==
The film was produced by Park the Bus, a Suffolk based production company founded by Greg Cruttwell which focuses on creating sport-related documentaries and dramas. Filming took place in grassroots football venues across the UK. The film was completed in May 2022.

== Release ==
The film was released in UK cinemas on the 31 March 2023 and on digital platforms on 1 May 2023. It is currently available for streaming on Amazon Prime Video.

== Reception ==
The documentary received positive reviews from critics. Rotten Tomatoes reported an approval rating of 83% based on six reviews.

- The Reviews Hub said: “What makes the film so compelling is that, without a trace of sentimentality, it is a homage to happiness”.
- The Guardian said: “This is a positive, feelgood film about the sense of purpose found in being part of a community, giving your time, getting stuck in”.
- The Arts Desk said: “Director Greg Cruttwell has a powerful radar for unforgettable characters”.
