= Lucia in London =

1927 novel by E. F. Benson

- Title page for Lucia in London (1928)
- Author: E. F. Benson
- Language: English
- Genre: Comic novel
- Publisher: Hutchinson
- Publication date: 1927
- Publication place: United Kingdom
- Preceded by: Miss Mapp
- Followed by: Mapp and Lucia

Lucia in London is a 1927 comic novel written by E. F. Benson. It is the third of six novels in the popular Mapp and Lucia series, about idle women in the 1920s and their struggle for social dominance over their small communities. The second Lucia novel, it is a sequel to 1920's Queen Lucia. In this novel, Lucia leaves her small town of Riseholme and moves to London, where she attacks the city's social life with the same eager ferocity.

== Plot ==
Emmeline Lucas and her husband "Peppino" acquire a second home in London from a deceased aunt. While her Riseholme friends Georgie Pillson and Daisy Quantock seethe with envy, Lucia moves to Brompton Square, where she can social-climb to the highest circles. Her gambits attract a group of astonished followers, including Stephen Merriall, secretly the society-column author Hermione. When Peppino falls ill, Lucia brings him back to Riseholme and nurses him back to health — and then turns her attention to reclaiming her place in her original kingdom.

== Writing ==
Benson wrote Lucia in London in six weeks from November 1925 to January 1926. In The Life of E.F. Benson, Brian Masters writes, "These were the kinds of books he raced through, enjoying himself the while, as he prepared for what he called real work." The "real work", for Benson, were the biographies that he published of Sir Francis Drake in 1927, and Alcibiades in 1928.

== Reception ==
Gilbert Seldes, in the introduction to a 1936 omnibus of the Lucia novels, wrote, "It is my own opinion that somewhere in the writing of Lucia in London the easy malice of the other works turned into actual unkindness. Lucia was out of place in London, and her author rather belabored her for going. But this is the only flaw in a perfect series."

In Frivolity Unbound, Robert F. Kiernan writes, "The fun of the novel and its camp appeal is that the delirium of Lucia's runaway ambition never bedims her sense of genteel propriety. All the while that she seems wildly out of control she is also calculating minutiae of etiquette and decorum, and the two behaviors are a giddy counterpoint... Yet to judge Lucia insane or foolish would be crude. The affectations that never fool anyone, the extraordinary expenditure of energy upon evanescent goals, and the willingness to risk all her dramatic effects upon a momentary inspiration make her an actress, not a Madwoman of Chaillot. She is an actress with only a middling talent, perhaps, and suited better to the provincial stage than to the London, but she has the confidence of a great actress in her ability to bring off a scene."

In The Alchemy of Laughter, Glen Cavaliero observes that in Lucia in London, "her snobbery, pretentiousness and blatant social climbing are neutralised and become occasions for an altogether wittier kind of mockery. An appreciative band of Luciaphiles is formed, who see through her and yet appreciate and enjoy her: Benson is fictionalising the readership for the succeeding novels, which provide the invigorating spectacle of people who behave badly without doing anybody any harm."

== Sequels ==
Lucia in London is the third book in what became known as the series of six Mapp and Lucia novels. In the next book, 1931's Mapp and Lucia, Lucia and Georgie move from Riseholme to Tilling, the setting of the 1922 book Miss Mapp. The fifth and sixth books, Lucia's Progress (1935) and Trouble for Lucia (1939), take place in Tilling.
