= Mapp & Lucia (1985 TV series) =

British television series

- Complete series DVD cover
- Genre: Comedy-drama
- Based on: Mapp and Lucia by E.F. Benson
- Written by: Gerald Savory
- Directed by: Donald McWhinnie
- Starring: Geraldine McEwan; Prunella Scales; Nigel Hawthorne; Denis Lill; Irene Handl
- Theme music composer: Jim Parker
- Country of origin: United Kingdom
- Original language: English
- No. of series: 2
- No. of episodes: 10

Production
- Executive producer: Nick Elliott
- Producer: Michael Dunlop
- Running time: 48−51 minutes
- Production company: LWT

Original release
- Network: Channel 4
- Release: 14 April 1985 – 31 May 1986

Mapp & Lucia is a British television series, set in the fictional Sussex coastal town of Tilling and based on three 1930s novels by E. F. Benson, beginning with Mapp and Lucia. It was produced by London Weekend Television, filmed in Rye (on which Benson based Tilling) and neighbouring Winchelsea in the 1980s, and starred Prunella Scales as Mapp, Geraldine McEwan as Lucia, Nigel Hawthorne as Georgie, and Denis Lill as Major Benjy. The script was by Gerald Savory. There were ten episodes, (which aired in two series of five) broadcast on Channel 4 in 1985 and 1986. The opening title painting was painted by the artist Reg Cartwright. These have been repeated over the years, and a new BBC adaptation, Mapp & Lucia, aired in 2014.

Series one is a five-episode adaptation of Mapp and Lucia (1931). Season two adapts both the fifth book (Lucia's Progress, 1935) in the first three episodes, and the sixth book (Trouble for Lucia, 1939) in the final two episodes.

== Cast ==
- Prunella Scales as Elizabeth Mapp
- Geraldine McEwan as Emmeline Lucas (Lucia)
- Nigel Hawthorne as Georgie Pillson
- Denis Lill as Major Benjy Flint
- Cecily Hobbs as Quaint Irene
- Mary MacLeod as Godiva 'Diva' Plaistow
- Geoffrey Chater as Algernon Wyse
- Marion Mathie as Susan Wyse MBE
- James Greene as Rev. Bartlett
- Ken Kitson as Cadman
- Lucinda Gane as Foljambe
- Geraldine Newman as Grosvenor
- Cherry Morris as Withers
- Irene Handl as Poppy, Duchess of Sheffield
- Anna Quayle as Olga Bracely
- Carol MacReady as Daisy Quantock
- David Gooderson as Mr. Woolgar

== Production ==
Filming took place in Rye and Winchelsea as well as Kent – Chilham features in episodes 1, 2 and 10, doubling as Risholme and Hever Castle features as the residence of Poppy, Duchess of Sheffield.

== Episodes ==
=== Series 1 (1985) ===
| No. | Title | Directed by | Written by | Original release date |
|---|---|---|---|---|
| 1 | "The Village Fete" | Donald McWhinnie | Gerald Savory | 14 April 1985 |
Mapp accepts Lucia as her new summer tenant and Georgie, encouraged by Lucia, finds his own lodgings in Tilling. After the successful fete in Riseholme, rescued from disaster by Lucia, they move into their new homes.
| 2 | "Battle Stations" | Donald McWhinnie | Gerald Savory | 21 April 1985 |
Mapp finds herself losing her position as the queen bee of Tilling society after Lucia's successful entertainments—none of which include Mapp. It appears open war is on the horizon between the two socialites.
| 3 | "The Italian Connection" | Donald McWhinnie | Gerald Savory | 28 April 1985 |
Lucia's tableaux to raise funds for the local hospital is a success and she takes the opportunity to seek revenge on Mapp for preventing the showing of hers and Georgie's art submissions at the local art exhibition. Lucia's success however is overshadowed by her subsequent home piano recitals that bore the attendees. The Contessa Faraglione visits and Lucia avoids Mapp's plans to expose Lucia's lack of Italian, a fluency she has feigned as she actually knows only a few scattered phrases. Georgie provides the perfect ruse.
| 4 | "Lobster Pots" | Donald McWhinnie | Gerald Savory | 5 May 1985 |
Lucia decides to stay in Tilling and sells her house in Riseholme, much to Georgie's consternation. Mapp is suitably horrified, but soon is pleased that Tilling society now looks to her. Georgie decides to also stay. When Mapp tries to wheedle out the recipe for "Lobster á la Riseholme" from Lucia, her plan to steal it leads to unforeseen problems.
| 5 | "The Owl and the Pussycat" | Donald McWhinnie | Gerald Savory | 12 May 1985 |
With the apparent drowning of Mapp and Lucia, both Georgie and Major Flint find themselves about to receive sizable inheritances. Georgie, on his part, has been shopping for a memorial. Mapp and Lucia surprisingly return and find the Major has jumped the gun in claiming his good fortune early. After reflection, Mapp sees an opportunity.

=== Series 2 (1986) ===
| No. | Title | Directed by | Written by | Original release date |
|---|---|---|---|---|
| 6 | "Winner Takes All" | Donald McWhinnie | Gerald Savory | 3 May 1986 |
Georgie has shingles so Lucia lets him stay at Grebe. After dabbling in the stock market Lucia's shares in the South African gold mine Siriami pay dividends and other Tilling residents join in. Everybody profits except Mapp and Major Benjy. Mapp and Lucia stand against each other for seats on the local council.
| 7 | "Change and Change About" | Donald McWhinnie | Gerald Savory | 10 May 1986 |
Neither Mapp nor Lucia win a seat at the local election. Mapp and Major Benjy are strapped for cash. Lucia proposes that they swap houses and is excited when she believes that she has discovered ancient artifacts buried at Mallards.
| 8 | "Lady Bountiful" | Donald McWhinnie | Gerald Savory | 17 May 1986 |
Lucia donates money to restore the Tilling church organ and to several local charities. She is also offered a seat on the town council. Mapp and Benjy, still living at Grebe, are flooded out and are forced to move in with Lucia. Lucia has stunning news.
| 9 | "Worship" | Donald McWhinnie | Gerald Savory | 24 May 1986 |
Lucia marries Georgie and is made the mayor of Tilling. She selects Mapp as Lady Mayoress.
| 10 | "Au Reservoir" | Donald McWhinnie | Gerald Savory | 31 May 1986 |
Lucia and Georgie travel to London and they meet Poppy who is interested in Georgie. Quaint Irene's portrait of Lucia as mayor is rejected while Irene's painting of Mapp has been declared the picture of the year. Lucia plots to regain her superiority as the social queen of Tilling.

== Home releases ==
| Series | Release date | | | Ref. |
| Series | Region 1 | Region 2 | Region 4 | Ref. |
|---|---|---|---|---|
| Series 1 | 12 November 2002 | 5 August 2002 | 7 July 2010 | |
| Series 2 | 22 June 2004 | N/A | 29 July 2011 | |
| Series 1 & 2 | 25 March 2014 | 13 October 2003 | N/A | |
