= Mapp and Lucia =

1931 novel by E. F. Benson

- First edition
- Author: E. F. Benson
- Language: English
- Genre: Comic novel
- Publisher: Hodder & Stoughton
- Publication date: 1931
- Publication place: United Kingdom
- Preceded by: Lucia in London
- Followed by: Lucia's Progress

Mapp and Lucia is a 1931 comic novel written by E. F. Benson. It is the fourth of six novels in the popular Mapp and Lucia series, about idle women in the 1920s and their struggle for social dominance over their small communities. It brings together two sets of characters from three previous Benson novels: Emmeline "Lucia" Lucas, Georgie Pillson and Daisy Quantock from Queen Lucia (1920) and Lucia in London (1927), and Miss Elizabeth Mapp and her neighbours from Miss Mapp (1922).

In this novel, Lucia and Georgie leave Riseholme to take up summer residence in Tilling, renting Miss Mapp's home of Mallards. Mapp and Lucia soon begin a war for the dominance of social life in Tilling.

== Plot ==
Mrs. Emmeline Lucas — known to all as "Lucia" — has lost her beloved husband Peppino, who has died since the previous book. Coming out of mourning after a year, she finds that Daisy Quantock has taken over the Elizabethan fête that Lucia originally planned. Determined not to stick around in Riseholme while Daisy plays Queen, Lucia and her friend Georgie Pillson drive down to the quaint seaside town of Tilling, where Elizabeth Mapp lives. Mapp is renting out her house, Mallards, for the summer, and she's delighted to have Lucia as her tenant, since she visited Riseholme several summers before. Lucia persuades Georgie to rent the nearby Mallards Cottage, and he joins her for the summer.

As Lucia was the social leader in Riseholme, Mapp is the queen bee of Tilling, and Mapp intends to use Lucia's visit to bolster her own social standing. Lucia, naturally, has no interest in being bossed, and she easily charms the Tillingites — Diva Plaistow, Major Benji Flint, Mr. and Mrs. Wyse, the Padre and wife, and Quaint Irene — who were sick of being under Mapp's thumb. In addition to this, Lucia used a strong chain on the front door to prevent Mapp from barging into her house whenever she likes, and she insists that the gardener whom she has contracted to pay should work on the lawn and the flowers, rather than grow and harvest Mapp's garden produce for sale.

Now the undisputed society leader, Lucia organizes dull musical parties which consist of listening to her play the first movement of the Moonlight Sonata on the piano. The Tillingites grow restless, and Mapp thinks that she can regain the upper hand when Mr. Wyse announces that his sister, the Contessa Faraglione, will be visiting Tilling, and is looking forward to speaking Italian with Lucia — who pretends to be a fluent Italian speaker, but actually knows only a few scattered phrases. Suspecting the truth, Mapp is thrilled at Lucia's imminent exposure. But Lucia suddenly comes down with imaginary influenza during the entirety of the Contessa's visit, and Georgie comes up with a trick to help Lucia prove that she can speak Italian fluently just as Mapp hopes to make her score.

Energized by this social combat, Lucia decides to stay in Tilling permanently, and buys a house on the outskirts of town called Grebe; Georgie will stay as well, taking a long lease on Mallards Cottage. Mapp is horrified that her rival is staying, but still hopes to gain the upper hand. She tries to wheedle out the recipe for "Lobster á la Riseholme" from Lucia, who refuses to comply. In a rage, Mapp sneaks into the kitchen at Grebe to find the recipe herself — but a storm floods the house, leaving both Mapp and Lucia stranded on top of a kitchen table, which floats out to sea.

Believing that the pair have drowned, the Tillingites grieve, in their own way. Georgie is informed that Lucia has left him Grebe and a large sum of money in her will, which he appreciates but refuses to collect until Lucia is officially pronounced dead. Major Flint, similarly informed that Mapp has left him Mallards, decides to move in right away, and take possession of Mapp's wine cellar. Mapp and Lucia do return to Tilling after several months, having been saved by an Italian fishing ship, and Mapp is enraged to find Major Flint in residence. She kicks him out of the house and refuses to speak to him, but then decides that this is an opportunity to marry Flint, whom she has always had her eye on. She manages to get Flint to finally propose to her, and the novel ends with her wedding party, where she serves "Lobster á la Riseholme", based on the recipe that she stole from Lucia.

== Reception ==
In Frivolity Unbound, Robert F. Kiernan writes that in this fourth book, Benson "stages a battle of leading ladies. It is his best novel largely because Mapp and Lucia have worthy competition for the first time. Daisy is never really competition for Lucia, for her efforts to supplant Lucia collapse of their own inadequacy, and Diva has no taste for competition with Mapp, only a sense of personal dignity that goads her into occasional self-defence... The competition between Mapp and Lucia is so generally equitable, on the other hand, that neither can sustain an advantage. If Lucia is always able to reverse Mapp's victories, Mapp never tires of dealing Lucia some fresh blow, usually from an unexpected quarter. They know each other completely... In pitting Mapp and Lucia against each other, Benson provided each woman with a new world to conquer but at the same time increased the difficulties in her way. The result is a narrative line extravagantly camp — rich with reversals and clotted with fine, ironic moments."

In The Alchemy of Laughter, Glen Cavaliero discusses "the fascination exerted by 'the sacred monster', the person one likes to read about but would hate to live with. There are many such in English fiction, from Fielding's Squire Western down to Nancy Mitford's fire-eating Uncle Matthew and to Inge Middleton and others in the work of Angus Wilson. E.F. Benson added to the list when he invented, initially in separation, both the affected, pretentious, domineering Emmeline Lucas ('Lucia') and the devious, manipulative and ineffectively malevolent Miss Mapp; and still more so when he enhanced the particular character of each by bringing them together in Mapp and Lucia and its two successors. By sheer accumulative power of comic reiteration these books, and their three predecessors concerning the pair in separation, not only create a comic world as self-sufficient as that of Surtees, but almost attain the illumination of comedic vision."

Brian Masters says in The Life of E.F. Benson, "It was a bold stroke to risk the clash of Titans in Mapp and Lucia, effected in the simplest manner by having Mrs. Lucas rent Miss Mapp's house in Tilling for a period of two months... It is much to Benson's credit that he contrives a preposterous climax without losing the reader's sympathy."

Iain Finlayson writes that Benson "would have been charmed to know that, forty years after his death, he would be back in vogue with the six novels featuring Miss Mapp and Lucia. These, being constantly reprinted, and selling in quantity (thanks in large part to the television series based on the novels), are perfect little masterpieces, minor period gems, adored by aficionados of their rather camp comedy. Though he himself regarded them as frivolous, and part of him would regret that his more substantial, more seriously-intended work has been overlooked, he would possibly regard the breeze of fashion, blowing across his most memorable creations, as a friendly wind."

== Sequels ==
Mapp and Lucia is the fourth book in what became known as the series of six Mapp and Lucia novels. The series is continued in Lucia's Progress (1935) and Trouble for Lucia (1939), which take place in Tilling.

== Adaptations ==
=== Television ===
The Mapp and Lucia series has been adapted for television twice, in a 1985 series originally aired on Channel 4, and a 2014 series on BBC One. Both adaptations begin with the fourth book in the series.

In the 1985 series, Mapp and Lucia is adapted in full over five episodes, and includes the Elizabethan fete sequences in Riseholme. Lucia then summers in Tilling, and battles with Mapp; the five episodes end with Mapp's marriage, and her theft of the recipe for Lobster á la Riseholme. The following series, broadcast in 1986, adapts both the fifth book (Lucia's Progress) in the first three episodes, and the sixth book (Trouble for Lucia) in the final two episodes.

The 2014 series offers an abridged version of Mapp and Lucia, beginning with Lucia coming to Tilling (but not including the Riseholme fete). This second episode includes a storyline from the first novel, Queen Lucia, about a guru visiting and being annexed by Lucia, which is transposed from Riseholme to Tilling. The third episode includes the Contessa Faraglione sequence, but does not include the lobster/kitchen table sequence.

=== Stage ===
The novel was also adapted for a 1948 stage play, Make Way for Lucia, written by John Van Druten. The play ran for 29 performances at the Cort Theatre on Broadway.
