= Miss Mapp =

1922 novel by E. F. Benson

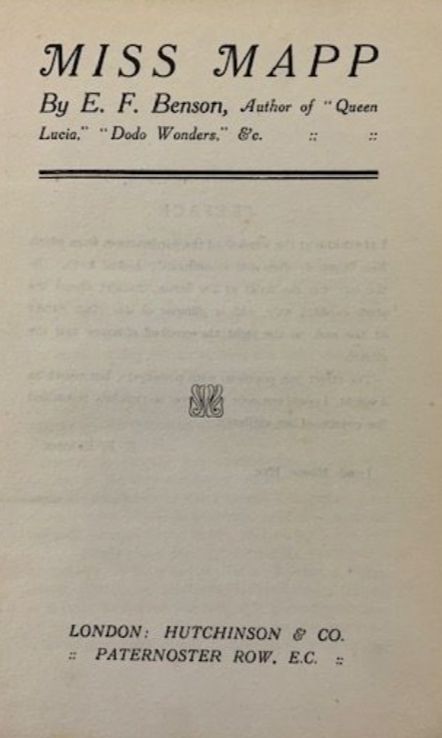
- Title page for Miss Mapp (1922)
- Author: E. F. Benson
- Language: English
- Genre: Comic novel
- Publisher: Hutchinson
- Publication date: 1922
- Publication place: United Kingdom
- Preceded by: Queen Lucia
- Followed by: Lucia in London

Miss Mapp is a 1922 comic novel written by E. F. Benson. It is the second of six novels in the popular Mapp and Lucia series, about idle women in the 1920s and their struggle for social dominance over their small communities. This book introduces Miss Mapp, the social tyrant of the fictional coastal town of Tilling, and the cast of Tillingites, including Diva Plaistow, Major Benji Flint, Mr. and Mrs. Wyse, and Quaint Irene. Tilling was inspired by the town of Rye, where Benson lived at Lamb House, with his own commanding view of the High Street inspiring Mapp's domain, Mallards.

Like the 1920 Queen Lucia, which features a similar domineering lead character, the book was a success for Benson, and led to the realisation that "his financial future might very well depend thenceforth upon his creation of monstrous women." Both Lucia and Mapp went on to appear in further novels, making a joint six-book series.

== Plot ==
Miss Elizabeth Mapp presides over the High Street of the seaside town of Tilling, keeping tabs on all of the gossip, and directing social activity. She competes in bitter rivalry with a neighbour, Godiva Plaistow, over dress-making, and observes the battles over golf and alcohol between Captain Richard Puffin and Major Benjamin Flint. There are further social wars over daylight saving time, bridge games, and the significance of a neighbour being recognised as a Member of the Order of the British Empire.

== Writing ==
In his autobiography, Final Edition, Benson wrote that he came up with the character when he sat at the window at Lamb House:

"The ladies of Rye doing their shopping in the High Street every morning, carrying large market baskets, and bumping into each other in narrow doorways, and talking in a very animated manner... I outlined an elderly atrocious spinster and established her in Lamb House. She should be the centre of all social life, abhorred and dominant, and she should sit like a great spider behind the curtains in the garden-room, spying on her friends, and I knew that her name must be Elizabeth Mapp.

Rye should furnish the topography, so that no one who knew Rye could possibly be in doubt where the scene was laid, and I would call it Tilling because Rye has its river the Tillingham...

Perhaps another preposterous woman, Lucia of Riseholme, who already had a decent and devout following, and who was as dominant as Mapp, might come into contact with her some day, when I had got to know Mapp better. I began to invent a new set of characters who should revolve round these two women, fussy and eager and alert and preposterous. Of course, it would all be small beer, but one could get a head upon it of jealousies and malignities and devouring inquisitiveness. Like Moses on Pisgah I saw a wide prospect, a Promised Land, a Saga indefinitely unveiling itself."

The character was partly based on the novelist Marie Corelli, who also inspired the character of Lucia in 1920's Queen Lucia. Like Corelli, Mapp ostentatiously ignores daylight saving time, and hoards food.

== Setting ==
The invention of Tilling was based on Rye, where Benson lived starting in 1919. In E.F. Benson, As He Was, Palmer and Lloyd write, "Elizabeth Mapp lived in Tilling, a picturesque little town surrounded by level marshlands and tall reedy dykes. It is on a hill and contains many roughcast and timber cottages, mellow Georgian fronts, cobbled streets and quaint corners. This is an exact description of Rye, and Mallards, the house she lived in, is [Benson's] Lamb House. It is described as having 'charming little panelled parlours with big windows letting in a flood of air and sunshine, plain, well-shaped rooms all looking so white and comfortable, and a broad staircase with narrow treads.' A flight of eight steps with a canopy of wisteria led to the Garden Room which was built at right angles to the front of the house, from the bow windows of which Miss Mapp could observe the comings and goings of her Tillingite friends."

== Reception ==
A contemporary review in The Bookman says, "Mr. Benson has made a narrative out of what are usually regarded as the trimmings of a novel, the small circumstances, the everyday conversations, the hourly happenings of ordinary people... It is surprising how quickly Miss Mapp's curiosity about her neighbours becomes our own." Asking whether the book merely narrates storms in tea-cups, the review concludes, "Mr. Benson is at liberty to reply that while we are among the tea-cups of Tilling the storm is very real."

Palmer and Lloyd argue against a popular critique of Benson's work: "It is clear that Fred [Benson] was obsessed by love for his preposterous characters. The claim that he was malicious and bitchy because they were women and he disliked women is patently untrue... Fred liked them, and had many women friends of all ages and types all through his life. Some of them were enchanting, some were intimidating, some sweet and silly, and others shrewd. In his memoirs he wrote about them with sympathy and understanding. But he loved to poke fun at certain types of women, to comment satirically on their snobbery, prick the bubble of their pretensions and laugh at their social antics."

== Sequels ==
Miss Mapp and the other members of Tilling society returned in a 1931 book, Mapp and Lucia, merging the cast with the main characters from Benson's popular 1920 novel Queen Lucia. Mapp and Lucia go on to appear in another two books, Lucia's Progress (1935, published in the US as The Worshipful Lucia), and Trouble for Lucia (1939).
