= Greg Cruttwell =

English football consultant and former actor

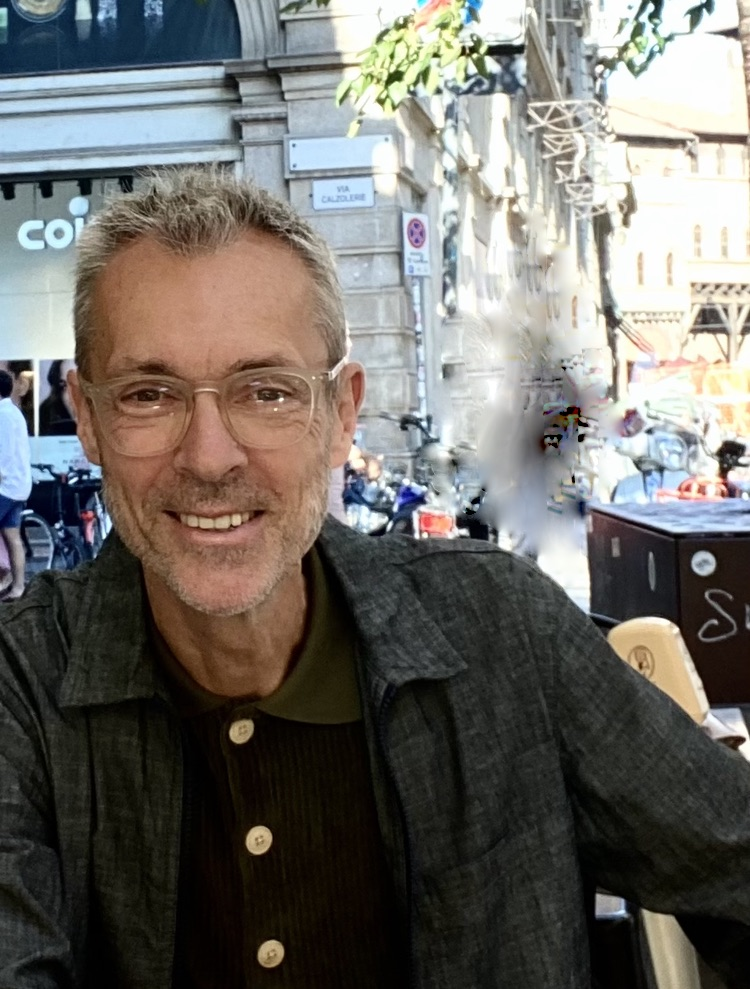
- Greg Cruttwell
- Born: 22 March 1960 (age 66); London, England
- Education: London Academy of Music and Dramatic Art
- Occupations: Filmmaker, former actor, and founder of Balham F.C.
- Years active: 1981–present
- Parent(s): Hugh Cruttwell; Geraldine McEwan
Association football career
Managerial career
- Years: Team
- 2011–2022: Balham
- Website: https://parkthebus.uk

Gregory Jasper Cruttwell (born 22 March 1960) is an English filmmaker, former actor and the founder of football club, Balham F.C. He is the son of actress Geraldine McEwan and Hugh Cruttwell, former principal of the Royal Academy of Dramatic Art.

== Biography ==
Cruttwell attended the London Academy of Music and Dramatic Art from 1978-1981.

Before branching out as a writer, director and producer, Cruttwell performed in over 20 theatre productions throughout Great Britain.

In 1990, he wrote and starred in the play Waiting for Sir Larry, which won a Fringe First Award at the Edinburgh Festival.

He made his film debut in Mike Leigh's Naked (1993) and had a leading role in John Herzfeld's 2 Days in the Valley (1996), starring alongside James Spader, Jeff Daniels and Danny Aiello. His last acting role to date was in the box office success George of the Jungle (1997).

Cruttwell has been seen in numerous British television productions, including Murder Most Horrid, and Birds of a Feather. In the United States, he guest starred in episodes of Murder, She Wrote and The Marshal.

In 2000, he wrote and directed the feature film, Chunky Monkey, starring David Threlfall and Alison Steadman, which had a limited release in the UK.

In 2002, he co-founded production company Head Gear Films with Phil Hunt and Compton Ross and in 2007 co-founded international sales and film finance company Bankside Films.

In 2001 Cruttwell also founded Balham Football Club (originally called Balham Blazers FC). Since its formation the club has won over 700 league and cup trophies, including the London Senior Cup in 2018 and London Senior Trophy in 2017. Following five promotions in six years, after being launched in 2011, the senior first team, which made its first appearance in the FA Cup in 2018, currently plays at Step 5 in the Football League Pyramid..

In 2011 the club was voted South East England Charter Standard Community Club of the Year and in 2012 Cruttwell won the London FA award for outstanding contribution to sport and physical activity.

The club is also a three-time winner of the London F.A. Charter Standard Community Club of the Year Award and a four-time winner of the Wandsworth Sports Club of the Year Award.

In addition to founding the club, Cruttwell, now Club President, has been Chairman, Director of Football and coached many age group teams. He was also First Team Manager between 2011 and 2022.

In 2018, bringing together his two passions in life, sport and the arts, Cruttwell co-devised football based TV Quiz show, Football Genius, a Hat Trick production, which was shown on ITV, with Tim Vine as host and Sam Quek and Paul Sinha as team captains.

Continuing in the same vein, in 2019 he founded production company Park the Bus, which has a remit to make sports-related drama and documentaries. To date, he has written, directed and produced two films for the company, The Football Monologues and Animals. He's also produced and directed three documentaries, Going To The Dogs, King of Clubs and In the Middle, which won the Best Screenplay Award at the 2022 Paladino d'Oro Sports Film Festival.

Cruttwell, who moved from London to Suffolk in 2020, with his wife Rachel Hart, has four children, three grandchildren and is a lifelong supporter of Fulham FC.
