= Gerald Savory =

English screenwriter and TV producer (1909–1996)

- Born: Gerald Douglas Savory; 17 November 1909; London, England
- Died: 9 February 1996 (aged 86); England
- Occupations: Writer, television producer
- Spouses: Teo Dunbar (m. 1938, divorced) Althea Murphy (m. 1950; died 1952) Annette Carell (m. 1953; died 1967) Sheila Brennan (m. 1970)

Gerald Douglas Savory (17 November 1909 – 9 February 1996) was an English writer and television producer who specialised in comedies.

== Early life ==
The son of Kenneth Douglas Savory and actress Grace Lane (1877–1956), Savory was educated at Bradfield College and worked as a stockbroker's clerk before turning to the stage (Hull Repertory Theatre Company 1931–33), first as an actor then a writer.

== Career ==
Savory's play George and Margaret, written while out of work as an actor, ran for two years at Wyndham's Theatre and a year at the Piccadilly. It then transferred to Broadway, where it ran for 86 performances, and was later filmed. His earliest work in the film industry was as a dialogue writer for director Alfred Hitchcock's Young and Innocent (1937).

Savory lived in the US in the 1940s and 50s writing for film and television, and became an American citizen. After returning to England in the mid-1950s he became a writer, producer and production manager for Granada Television, producing five episodes of ITV Play of the Week; adapting Saki, J.B. Priestley, Noël Coward and Tennessee Williams for television. He then joined BBC Television, first as Head of Serials, then Head of Plays. He produced the unsuccessful series Churchill's People (1975–76) for the BBC and Love in a Cold Climate (1980) for Thames Television.

== Personal life ==
Savory was married four times but had no children other than a stepson by his fourth wife. His first marriage, to writer Teo Dunbar, ended in divorce. In 1950, he married American actress Althea Murphy (1916–1952), who died of leukemia in 1952. In 1953, he married actress Annette Carell, who died by suicide in 1967. He was survived by his fourth wife, actress Sheila Brennan, whom he married in 1970.

Savory died in England on 9 February 1996.

== Plays ==
- George and Margaret 1937 (377 performances in the West End, filmed in 1940)
- Hand in Glove 1944 with Charles K. Freeman based on his own novel Hughie Roddis
- A Likely Tale 1957
- A Month of Sundays 1957
- So Many Children 1959
- Cup and Saucer 1961
- Twinkling of an Eye 1965

== Novels ==
- Hughie Roddis 1942
- Behold This Dreamer 1943

== Television ==
- South, 24 November 1959, ITV Play of the Week (adaptation)
- Count Dracula, 1977
- Mapp and Lucia, Series One 1985; Series Two 1986
