= Lucia's Progress =

1935 novel by E. F. Benson

- Title page for Lucia's Progress (1935)
- Author: E. F. Benson
- Language: English
- Genre: Comic novel
- Publisher: Hodder & Stoughton
- Publication date: 1935
- Publication place: United Kingdom
- Preceded by: Mapp and Lucia
- Followed by: Trouble for Lucia

Lucia's Progress (published in the US as The Worshipful Lucia) is a 1935 comic novel written by E. F. Benson. It is the fifth of six novels in the popular Mapp and Lucia series, about idle women in the 1920s and their struggle for social dominance over their small communities. It continues the story from the 1931 novel Mapp and Lucia, which brought Emmeline "Lucia" Lucas and Georgie Pillson from Queen Lucia (1920) and Lucia in London (1927) together with Miss Elizabeth Mapp and her neighbours from Miss Mapp (1922).

In this novel, Mapp and Lucia continue their efforts to control social life in the quaint seaside town of Tilling. Lucia and Mapp both enter the world of high finance, and run for seats on the Borough Council. Major incidents include Lucia's excavation for Roman ruins in the garden of Mallards, Mapp's suggestion that she may be pregnant, and Lucia and Georgie's sexless marriage.

== Inspiration ==
The town of Tilling was famously inspired by Rye, East Sussex, where E. F. Benson lived, and incidents involving his neighbours sometimes found their way into his comic novels. In E. F. Benson Remembered, and the World of Tilling, Cynthia and Tony Reavell point out one correspondence involving a Rye resident, writer Radclyffe Hall: "We learn that Radclyffe Hall was greatly excited when she was having extensive alterations done to her house, The Black Boy, in the High Street in 1930, to find a number of ancient objects emerging from the excavations. The same thing happens to Lucia in Lucia's Progress, published in 1935."

== Reception ==
In Frivolity Unbound, Robert F. Kiernan notes that sexual repression is a key theme in the novel, with Lucia and Georgie's marriage dependent on the fact that neither have any appetite for affectionate caresses, and Mapp's pregnancy charade. He writes, "What is one to make of the preoccupation with incidental pastimes in Tilling except that everyone is as desperate as Mapp to fill nature's void?"

A contemporary review in the Vancouver Sun found the novel insubstantial but charming, while the Sydney Morning Herald wrote, "Mr. Benson has undoubtedly given us no book more charged with 'mirth that after no repenting draws.'"

== Sequel ==
Lucia's Progress is the fifth book in what became known as the series of Mapp and Lucia novels. The series is continued in Trouble for Lucia, published in 1939.

== Adaptation ==
In the 1985 television adaptation Mapp and Lucia, Lucia's Progress is used as the basis for the first three episodes of the second series; the final two episodes of the series are based on the sixth book (Trouble for Lucia).
