= The Littlest Horse Thieves =

1976 film by Charles Jarrott

Escape from the Dark (The Littlest Horse Thieves)
- UK quad poster
- Directed by: Charles Jarrott
- Written by: Rosemary Anne Sisson
- Story by: Burt Kennedy; Rosemary Anne Sisson
- Produced by: Ron Miller
- Starring: Alastair Sim; Peter Barkworth; Maurice Colbourne; Susan Tebbs; Andrew Harrison; Chloe Franks
- Cinematography: Paul Beeson
- Edited by: Richard Marden
- Music by: Ron Goodwin
- Production company: Walt Disney Productions
- Distributed by: Buena Vista Distribution
- Release dates: 26 May 1976 (UK); 11 March 1977 (US)
- Running time: 104 minutes
- Countries: United Kingdom; United States
- Language: English

The Littlest Horse Thieves (British title: Escape from the Dark) is a 1976 family drama film produced by Walt Disney Productions and released on 11 March 1977 in the United States and on 26 May 1976 in the United Kingdom under the title Escape from the Dark.It was first released on a double bill with The Many Adventures of Winnie the Pooh.

== Plot ==
Set in 1909 in Yorkshire, England, a coal mine has long relied on pit ponies to transport coal. When the mine introduces machinery to increase production and profitability, the ponies are deemed obsolete and slated for slaughter. Upon learning of this, three children devise a plan to rescue the ponies and release them.

== Production ==
The film was based on a script by Burt Kennedy who had read an article about pit ponies in London. He wrote up a script and sold it to Ron Miller at Disney. Kennedy was a writer director but Miller felt he was better suited to Westerns and the film was given to another writer and director with whom Disney had deals. Kennedy called the movie " pretty good—not as good as it should have been, but it's pretty good."

== See also ==
- List of films about horses
