= Mapp & Lucia (2014 TV series) =

- Part one titlecard
- Genre: Comedy-drama
- Based on: Mapp and Lucia by E. F. Benson
- Written by: Steve Pemberton
- Directed by: Diarmuid Lawrence
- Composer: Kevin Sargent
- Country of origin: United Kingdom
- Original language: English
- No. of series: 1
- No. of episodes: 3

Production
- Executive producer: Lisa Osborne
- Producer: Susie Liggat
- Production locations: Tilling, Rye, East Sussex, England, United Kingdom
- Cinematography: Dirk Nel
- Running time: 60 minutes
- Production company: BBC Drama Production

Original release
- Network: BBC One; BBC One HD
- Release: 29 December – 31 December 2014

Mapp & Lucia is a British drama television series that was first broadcast on BBC One from 29 to 31 December 2014. The three-part series, adapted by Steve Pemberton and directed by Diarmuid Lawrence, is based on E. F. Benson's Mapp and Lucia series of novels. The series features an ensemble cast, with Miranda Richardson and Anna Chancellor playing the eponymous characters Elizabeth Mapp and Emmeline 'Lucia' Lucas. It is set in the Sussex coastal town of Tilling, based very closely on Rye, East Sussex, where it was filmed and where Benson lived. Although attracting modest viewing figures, the series received positive reviews from critics.

== Cast ==
- Anna Chancellor as Emmeline 'Lucia' Lucas
- Steve Pemberton as Georgie Pillson
- Miranda Richardson as Elizabeth Mapp
- Mark Gatiss as Major Benjy
- Felicity Montagu as Godiva 'Diva' Plaistow
- Gemma Whelan as Irene Coles
- Paul Ritter as Reverend Kenneth Bartlett
- Poppy Miller as Evie Bartlett
- Nick Woodeson as Mr Wyse
- Pippa Haywood as Mrs Wyse
- Katy Brand as Hermione 'Hermy' Pillson
- Joanna Scanlan as Ursula 'Ursy' Pillson
- Frances Barber as Amelia, Contessa di Faraglione
- Jenny Platt as Foljambe
- Gavin Brocker as Cadman
- Soo Drouet as Grosvenor
- Susan Porrett as Withers
- Harish Patel as Guru/Gupta

== Episodes ==
No.	Title	Directed by	Written by	Original release date	UK viewers (millions)
1	"Episode 1"	Diarmuid Lawrence	Steve Pemberton	29 December 2014	4.87
It is 1930 and in the quaint Queen Anne village of Tilling and Miss Elizabeth Mapp reigns supreme over them all. Until, that is, the arrival of Mrs Emmeline 'Lucia' Lucas. With her passion for music, art and high culture of all kinds, Lucia is quite an addition to Tilling's social scene. It's not long before Mapp is indulging attempts to undermine her accomplished tenant.
2	"Episode 2"	Diarmuid Lawrence	Steve Pemberton	30 December 2014	2.92 (overnight)
The Tilling Summer Exhibition provides Lucia with a new battlefield to conquer. She and Georgie prepare to amaze their new friends with their artistic ability, whatever lengths they have to go to for success. Their triumphs leave Mapp in a fury until an exotic visitor passing through Tilling provides her with an opportunity to start a new trend.
3	"Episode 3"	Diarmuid Lawrence	Steve Pemberton	31 December 2014	2.24 (overnight)
While most of Tilling thrills to Lucia's artistic accomplishments, Mapp is convinced that her summer visitor is a fraud. Suspecting that her tenant's grasp of Italian is limited to the few phrases she may have picked up from occasional trips to the opera, Mapp thrills to the news that Tilling is to be visited by a genuine Italian contessa. This surely will call Lucia's bluff. And when Lucia goes down with a bout of influenza on the very day of the contessa's arrival, all of Mapp's suspicions seem justified.

== Production ==
Mapp and Lucia was commissioned by Charlotte Moore and Ben Stephenson for BBC One. Filming took place in and around Rye during the summer of 2014 as well as Kent and East Sussex Railway Station in Tenterden.

The "guru" storyline in episode 2 is taken from E.F. Benson's first Lucia novel, Queen Lucia (1920), with Daisy Quantock being the guru's original sponsor. Transported to Tilling in this series, Diva Plaistow plays the Daisy role in the storyline.

== Reception ==
Mapp and Lucia received positive reviews from critics. Writing for The Guardian, Julia Raeside said the series left her "champing at the bit for more". In a review in The Guardian, by Euan Ferguson, he described it as the "most deliciously moreish television made [in 2014]". Nina Stibbe of The Guardian said it was "marvellous" and that the characters were "as funny and charming as they should be".

Ellen E. Jones of The Independent said "no doubt this series will have new readers seeking out Benson's books, and a second BBC series wouldn't go amiss either". In a second review written for The Independent, Neela Debnath wrote that the actors "try their hardest", but the script "doesn't serve them well". She also compliemented the cinematography. Writing on the series finale, Debnath said it was "a marked improvement on the much duller first episode".

Writing for Stuff, Trevor Agnew said that "there's a lot of fun to be had" with the series, and complimented its costume design and acting.
