= Trouble for Lucia =

1939 novel by E. F. Benson

- Title page for Trouble for Lucia (1939)
- Author: E. F. Benson
- Language: English
- Genre: Comic novel
- Publisher: Hodder & Stoughton
- Publication date: 1939
- Publication place: United Kingdom
- Preceded by: Lucia's Progress

Trouble for Lucia is a 1939 comic novel written by E. F. Benson. It is the sixth and final novel in the popular Mapp and Lucia series, about idle women in the 1920s and their struggle for social dominance over their small communities.

In this novel, Emmeline "Lucia" Lucas is named Mayor of Tilling, an appointment that inflates her already elevated sense of self-importance. She appoints her rival Elizabeth Mapp as her mayoress, in the vain hope that this would blunt Mapp's constant schemes to undermine Lucia. Lucia makes a social blunder when she announces that as the Mayor, she will no longer play cards for money, and she is challenged when Mapp introduces a female novelist into their circle. Irene paints an unflattering portrait of Mapp and her husband, and the painting is chosen as Picture of the Year by the Royal Academy. Other incidents include Major Benjy losing his riding crop under mysterious circumstances, Lucia and Georgie taking up bicycling, and Lucia being criticized after boasting to her friends about a passing acquaintance with Poppy, duchess of Sheffield.

== Inspiration ==
Benson was elected Mayor of Rye in 1934, an honour that's reflected in Trouble for Lucia. Cynthia and Tony Reavell in E. F. Benson Remembered say that this is "an astonishing coincidence, because Lucia was about to become Mayor of Tilling in a new novel he had written but which hadn't yet been published."

== Reception ==
The Saturday Review gave the book a glowing review: "Mr. Benson's comic invention seemed to be wearing a little thin in The Worshipful Lucia, the previous and fifth link in the Lucia-Mapp saga, but he is at the top of his form in this one, turning off some uncommonly deft, gay, and full-bodied farcical writing."

In Frivolity Unbound, Robert F. Kiernan expresses concern that Lucia is not as powerful a figure as she is in the previous novels. He writes, "Benson... apparently did not foresee that Trouble for Lucia would be the last volume of the sequence — the last novel, in fact, that he would write. Yet it is difficult to imagine what he might further have done with Lucia."

== Adaptation ==
In the 1985 television adaptation Mapp and Lucia, Lucia's Progress is used as the basis for the first three episodes of the second series; the final two episodes of the series are based on Trouble for Lucia.
