= ScreenPlay =

British television series

- Genre: Drama anthology
- Country of origin: United Kingdom
- Original language: English
- No. of series: 8
- No. of episodes: 95 (list of episodes)

Production
- Production company: BBC

Original release
- Network: BBC2
- Release: 9 July 1986 – 27 October 1993

ScreenPlay is a television drama anthology series broadcast on BBC2 between 9 July 1986 and 27 October 1993.

== Background ==
After single-play anthology series went off the air, the BBC introduced several showcases for made-for-television, feature length filmed dramas, including ScreenPlay. Various writers and directors were utilised on the series. Writer Jimmy McGovern was hired by producer George Faber to pen a series five episode based upon the Merseyside needle exchange programme of the 1980s. The episode, directed by Gillies MacKinnon, was entitled Needle and featured Sean McKee, Emma Bird, and Pete Postlethwaite. The last episode of the series was titled "Boswell and Johnson's Tour of the Western Islands" and featured Robbie Coltrane as English writer Samuel Johnson, who in the autumn of 1773, visits the Hebrides off the north-west coast of Scotland. That episode was directed by John Byrne and co-starred John Sessions and Celia Imrie. Some scenes were shot at Lennoxlove House in East Lothian and others in the Scottish Borders.

== Plays ==
Series	Episodes	Originally released	
Series	Episodes	First released	Last released
1	13	9 July 1986	2 October 1986
2	13	15 July 1987	7 October 1987
3	10	13 July 1988	28 September 1988
4	11	5 July 1989	20 September 1989
5	13	11 July 1990	29 December 1990
6	15	3 July 1991	18 September 1991
7	14	1 July 1992	30 September 1992
8	6	22 September 1993	27 October 1993

=== Series 1 (1986) ===
No. overall	No. in series	Title	Directed by	Written by	Producer	Original release date
1	1	"All Together Now"	David Attwood	Peter Buckman	Robin Midgley	9 July 1986
Cast: Colin Farrell, Colin Blumenau, Jerome Davies, Bryan James, Terry Molloy, Colyn Davies, Nick Mercer, Jacqueline Hill, Audrey Leybourne, Lynda Myers, Michael Griffiths, Chrissy Roberts, Alan Starkey, Keith Mansell, Patrick Wilkes and Clive Swift
2	2	"Daylight Robbery"	Chris Goddard	Rose Tremain	Brenda Reid	16 July 1986
Cast: Joan Hickson, Lynn Farleigh, Michael N. Harbour, Denys Hawthorne, Matthew Long, Gay Baynes, Ed Devereaux, Robert Lang, Tony Meyer, Annie Gurney, Alexander Goodman, David McEwan and David Telfer
3	3	"Brick Is Beautiful"	David Wheatley	Andy Armitage	Brenda Reid	23 July 1986
Cast: Christopher Wild, Caroline Milmoe, Ian Mercer, Paul Oldham, Terry Sue-Patt, Tommy Boyle, Bert Gaunt, Stephen Boyes, Lottie Ward, Ruth Holden, Wendy Votel, Gilly Coman, Roberta Kerr, Louis Raynes, Anthony Benson, Drew Dawson, Doc O'Brien, Mike Donelan, Joan Campion, Margo Stanley, Ian Bleasdale and John Ryan
4	4	"Knowing the Score"	Brian Parker	Alma Cullen	Tom Kinninmont	30 July 1986
Cast: Colette O'Neil, Andrew Keir, Sandra Voe, Katy Hale, Pat Harkins, Anne Myatt, Jan Wilson, Anne Lacey, Martin Heller, Tracey Chapman, Simon Donald, William Armour, Ray Jeffries and Jonathan Battersby
5	5	"Drums Along Balmoral Drive"	Jane Howell	Douglas Livingstone	Brenda Reid	6 August 1986
Cast: Colin Blakely, Derek Fuke, Benedict Taylor, Michael Turner, Rowena Cooper, Larrington Walker, Jabu Mbalo, Inez Thorn, Michael Wynne, Anne Carroll, Hugh Quarshie, Eddie Tagoe, Michael Crompton, Femi Taylor, Christopher Asante, Nicholas Grant, Tommy Buson and Thomas Baptiste
6	6	"Asinamali"	Ross Devenish	Mbongeni Ngema	David M. Thompson	13 August 1986
Cast: Solomzi Bisholo, Thami Cele, Bongani Hlophe, Bheki Mgadi, Boy Ngema and Mbongeni Ngema
7	7	"In Traction"	David Wickham	Stuart Paterson	Tom Kinninmont	20 August 1986
Cast: James Kennedy, Patrick Hannaway, Joe Mullaney, Leonard O'Malley, Matthew Hodgman, Caroline Paterson, Angie Murphy, John McGlynn, Una MacNab, Andrew Barr, Stuart Bishop, Robert Paterson
8	8	"The Mozart Inquest"	Anthony Garner	Simon Whitworth	Martin Thompson	27 August 1986
Cast: Elizabeth Garvie, James Griffiths, Clifford Rose, Patrick Stewart, Kate Fahy and Elizabeth Spender
9	9	"The Marlowe Inquest"	Anthony Garner	Simon Whitworth	Martin Thompson	3 September 1986
Cast: John Woodvine, John Savident, Michael Pennington, Nicholas Gecks, Nicholas Le Prevost, Geoffrey Beevers and Matthew Marsh
10	10	"Blood, Sweat and Tears"	Nicholas Renton	John Godber	Brenda Reid	10 September 1986
Cast: Jane Clifford, Gillian Tompkins, Michael Callaghan, Liza Sadovy and Steven Brough
11	11	"Shift Work"	Angela Pope	Lesley Bruce	Brenda Reid	24 September 1986
Cast: Maureen Lipman, Stephen Dillane, Jeffrey Chiswick, Tony Alleff, Amy Rosenthal, Adam Rosenthal, Max Murray-Barrows, Christopher Chescoe, Treva Etienne, Yolanda Vazquez, Eddie Caswell, Prue Clarke, Angus Kennedy, David Bauckham, Richard Platt, Ian Collier, Lockwood West, Robert Austin and Jim Dunk
12	12	"Paying Guests: Early Skirmishes"	Michael Simpson	E. F. Benson (novel); Thomas Ellice	Rosemary Hill	1 October 1986
Cast: Robert Hardy, Angela Thorne, Benjamin Whitrow, Judy Cornwell, Joanna David, Annette Crosbie, Richard O'Callaghan, Avril Elgar, Barbara Leigh-Hunt, Sylvia Barter, Maryann Turner, David Quilter, Margaretta Scott, Barbara Hicks and Reginald Jessup
13	13	"Paying Guests: The Final Assent"	Michael Simpson	E. F. Benson (novel); Thomas Ellice	Rosemary Hill	2 October 1986
Cast: Robert Hardy, Angela Thorne, Benjamin Whitrow, Judy Cornwell, Joanna David, Annette Crosbie, Richard O'Callaghan, Avril Elgar, Barbara Leigh-Hunt, Sylvia Barter, Maryann Turner, David Quilter, Margaretta Scott, Barbara Hicks and Reginald Jessup

=== Series 2 (1987) ===
No. overall	No. in series	Title	Directed by	Written by	Producer	Original release date
14	1	"The Trial of Klaus Barbie"	Gareth Jones	Ray Jenkins	Tim Ironside Wood; Dennis Woolf; Claudia Milne	15 July 1987
Cast: Mark Kingston, Maurice Denham, Christian Burgess, Jonathan Adams, Bernard Brown, David De Keyser, James Griffiths, Raad Rawi, John Stride, Colin Welland, David Calder, Charles Simon, Don Fellows, Sheila Raynor, Ronald Herdman, Lila Kaye, Peter Copley, Ray Smith, Tenniel Evans, Peter Woodthorpe, John Boswall, Sheila Burrell, Margery Mason, Margery Withers, Diana Coupland, Peggy Mount, Matyelok Gibbs, Lollie May, Beryl Cooke, Bruce Montague, Paul Anil and Jim McManus
15	2	"Land"	David Wheatley	Barry Collins	David M. Thompson	22 July 1987
Cast: John Terry, Fernando Continentino, Rui Polanah, Maria Padilha, Bebeto Baia, Dira Paes and Eduardo Conde
16	3	"Lily My Love"	Adrian Shergold	Elisabeth Bond	David Snodin	29 July 1987
Cast: Bill Paterson, Cindy Holden, David Horovitch, Ian Sharp, Lynne Verrall, Will Tacey and Graeme Kirk
17	4	"Cariani and the Courtesans"	Leslie Megahey	Leslie Megahey	David M. Thompson	5 August 1987
Cast: Paul McGann, Simon Callow, Michael Gough, Diana Quick, Louiza Livingstone, Robert Goodman, Charles Gray, Lucy Hancock, Linda Polan, Caroline England, Teresa Benham, Clive Merrison and Anthony Milner
18	5	"Our Lady Blue"	Robin Midgley	Heidi Thomas	Brenda Reid	12 August 1987
Cast: Patricia Hayes, Doreen Mantle, Eva Griffith, Paul Beringer, Maudie Smith, Mollie Maureen and Graham Aggrey
19	6	"White Lady"	David Rudkin	David Rudkin	Carol Parks	26 August 1987
Cast: Cornelius Garrett, Sophie Thompson, Jessica Martin and Meg Wynn Owen
20	7	"Scout"	Danny Boyle	Frank McGuinness	N/A	8 September 1987
Cast: Ray McAnally, Stephen Rea, Colin Connor, Michael Liebman, Gerard O'Hare, Lloyd Hutchinson, Jeremy Chapman and Paul Ryder
21	8	"The Venus de Milo Instead"	Danny Boyle	Anne Devlin	N/A	9 September 1987
Cast: Jeananne Crowley, Lorcan Cranitch, Iain Cuthbertson, Ruth McGuigan, Ann Hasson, Trudy Kelly, Aine McCartney, Leila Webster, Bridget Erin Bates, B J Hogg, Mark Mulholland, Brenda Winter, Jean Claude Deret, Sylvie Fevre, Tony Doyle
22	9	"The Rockingham Shoot"	Kieran Hickey	John McGahern	Danny Boyle	10 September 1987
Cast: Bosco Hogan, Niall Toibin, Tony Rohr, Marie Kean, Oliver Maguire, Ian McElhinney, Hilary Reynolds, John Olohan, Gerard McSorley, Libby Smyth, Carmel McDonnell, Ronan Wilmot, Dick Holland, William Walker, John Keyes, Tony Coleman, Michael Gormley and Lucie Jamieson
23	10	"The Shutter Falls"	Peter Barber-Fleming	Norman Malcolm MacDonald	Tom Kinninmont; Norman McCandlish	16 September 1987
Cast: Anthony Higgins, Emer Gillespie, Stella Gonet, Mary McInnes, Ewan Stewart, Billy Riddoch, Joan Scott, Hugh Martin, Gerry Slevin, Leonard Maguire, Iain Glass, Madelaine Taylor, Lloret McKenna and Robert Urquhart
24	11	"Christine"	Alan Clarke	Alan Clarke; Arthur Ellis	Brenda Reid	23 September 1987
Cast: Vicky Murdock, Kelly George, Joanne Mapp, Mark Harvey and Anthony Smith
25	12	"The Interrogation of John"	Nicholas Renton	Malcolm McKay	David Snodin	30 September 1987
Cast: Dennis Quilley, Bill Paterson, Michael Fitzgerald, Andrew Seear, Jimmy Yuill, Dean Harris, Sean Caffrey, Richard Cordery, Patrick Godfrey, David Quilter, Kenny Ireland, Niall Padden, Penny Leatherbarrow, Trevor Penton, Jonty Stephens, David Adair, Bill Thomas, John Ramm and Ian Arthur
26	13	"Road"	Alan Clarke	Jim Cartwright	Andrée Molyneux; David M. Thompson	7 October 1987
Cast: Jane Horrocks, Mossie Smith, Neil Dudgeon, William Armstrong, Susan Brown, David Thewlis, Moya Brady, Alan David, Lesley Sharp, Barbara Keogh, Tim Dantay, Andrew Wilde and Willy Ross Awards: Winner of the Best Television Drama Prize at the Monte Carlo Television Festival

=== Series 3 (1988) ===
No. overall	No. in series	Title	Directed by	Written by	Producer	Original release date
27	1	"No Further Cause for Concern"	John Bruce	Rib Davis	Graham Massey	13 July 1988
Cast: Sean Chapman, Rod Culbertson, John Benfield, John Tamms, Garrie J Lammin, David Hargreaves, Tony Melody, Roland Oliver, Edwin Brown, Ivor Roberts, Shaughan Seymour, Celia Bannerman, Trevor Cooper, John Sterland, David Arlen, Neil Todd, Terry Bamber and Terence Plummer
28	2	"A Woman Alone"	Sharon Miller	Dario Fo and Franca Rame translated by Gillian Hanna	Brenda Reid	20 July 1988
Cast: Lynn Redgrave, Nicholas Teare and Anthony Best
29	3	"Burning Ambition"	Roger Bamford	N/A	George Faber	27 July 1988
Cast: Simon McBurney, Marcello Magni, Richard Hope, Clive Mendus, Tim Barlow, Linda Kerr Scott, Rose English, Mick Barnfather, Jos Houben, Celia Gore Booth, Jean Campbell Dallas and Annabel Arden
30	4	"Eskimos Do It"	Derek Lister	Jim Barton	Richard Langridge	3 August 1988
Cast: Jean Boht, Liz Fraser, Ian Brimble, Neil Pearson, Ania Marson, Francis Low, Oscar Quitak, Jo Unwin, Cheryl Maiker and Catrin Menna
31	5	"Out of Love"	Michael Houldey	Tom Clarke	Ruth Caleb	10 August 1988
Cast: Juliet Stevenson, Dafydd Hywel, Emrys James, Cadfan Roberts, Robert Gwilym, Robin Griffith, Gwenllian Vies, John Henry-Hughes, Eluned Jones, Huw Neville and Meirion Morris
32	6	"Home Front"	Penny Cherns	Nick McCarty	Graham Massey	24 August 1988
Cast: Stephen McGann, Jason Cunliffe, Wilbert Johnson, Simon Vaughan, Jan Ruppe, Cathy Sandford, Nick Stringer, Patty Hannock, Michael Bray, Tina Marian, Tom Hutchinson, Geff Francis, Ursula Jones, Nicholas Day, Stafford Gordon, Kate O'Connell, Tim Brown, Maurice Kaufmann, Frankie Cosgrave and Tim Gatti
33	7	"Between the Cracks"	Lucy Parker	Lennie James and Lucy Parker	Ruth Caleb	31 August 1988
Cast: Leah Adeola, Richard Bench, Giselle Glasman, Kevin Gopie, Lennie James, Anthony Lennon, Simon McNally, Cliff Parisi, Baron Philip, Michael Quain, Gerald Simms and Richard Taylor
34	8	"The Black and Blue Lamp"	Guy Slater	Arthur Ellis	Brenda Reid	7 September 1988
Cast: Sean Chapman, Ian Brimble, Karl Johnson, John Woodvine, Nick Stringer, Peter Lovstrom, Kenneth Cranham, Ralph Brown, Barry Woolgar, Jonathan Chater, Paddy Ryan and Anthony Smee
35	9	"The Diary of Rita Patel"	Michael Jackley	Carole Boyer	Carolyn Montagu	14 September 1988
Cast: Cheryl Miller, Tony Wredden, Indira Joshi, Assam Mamodeally, Malcolm Scates, David Adair, Kumall Grewal, Dev Sagoo, Lyndam Gregory, Ian Arthur, Michael Mulkerrin, Jon Strickland, Melissa Wilson, Maiser Asghar, Sam Smart, Chis Pitt, Howard Shannon, Cy Town, Tony Calvert, Lee MacDonald, Martin Phillips and Ozzie Stevens
36	10	"Starlings"	David Wheatley	Andy Armitage	Brenda Reid	28 September 1988
Cast: Michael Maloney, Lynsey Baxter, David Ryall, Jane Downs, Frank Mills, Derek Newark, Wendy Seely, Tim Dantay, Lottie Ward, Ann Aris, Tommy Boyle, Robert Addie, Ralph Watson, Nicholas Fry, Guy Manning, Richard Lintern, Lucy Aston, Charmian Gradwell, Miles Richardson, Joshua Le Touzel, Ysanne Churchman, Pippa Vickers, Daphne Neville, Michael McStay, Alister Cameron and Anthony Benson

=== Series 4 (1989) ===
No. overall	No. in series	Title	Directed by	Written by	Producer	Original release date
37	1	"Testimony of a Child"	Peter Smith	Lucy Gannon	Louise Panton and Ruth Caleb	5 July 1989
Cast: John Bowe, Jill Baker, Jonathan Leigh, Victoria Shalet, Heather Tobias, Paul Copley, Dermot Crowley, Ann Curthoys, Anthony Smee, Lucy Foxwell, Kate Lonergan, Marlene Sidaway and Deborah Winckles
38	2	"A Night on the Tyne"	Corin Campbell-Hill	Bill Gallagher	Ruth Caleb	12 July 1989
Cast: Bryan Pringle, Alun Armstrong, Leslie Schofield, Robson Green, Melanie Hill, George Irving, Ralph Watson, Jimmy Swan, Rosalind Bailey, Eric Nicholson, Joe Ging and Steve Sutton
39	3	"Loving Hazel"	Peter Smith	Les Smith	George Faber	19 July 1989
Cast: Hugh Quarshie, Susan Brown, Gemma Darungton, Stephen Bent, Doña Croll, Sheila Kelley, Valerie Lilley, Arti Prashar, Andy Hockley, Ellie Haddington and Alan Cooke
40	4	"The Attractions"	Anthony Garner	Tony Marchant	Richard Langridge	26 July 1989
Cast: Benjamin Whitrow, Reece Dinsdale and Ethna Roddy
41	5	"Chinese Whispers"	Stuart Burge	Maurice Leitch	Robert Cooper	2 August 1989
Cast: Niall Buggy, Gary Waldhorn, Martin Wenner, Annette Badland, Niall Cusack, Liam de Staic, Renny Krupinski, Breffni McKenna, Tony Rohr, George Shane, Daragh O'Malley, Trudy Kelly, Trevor Moore and Mel Austin
42	6	"The Act"	Roy Battersby	Richard Langridge	Ruth Caleb	9 August 1989
Cast: Jack Shepherd, Barry Jackson, Kenneth Haigh, Andy de la Tour, Sally Dexter, Dominic Muldowney, Andrew Findon and Terry Seymour
43	7	"The Spirit of Man"	Peter Barnes	Peter Barnes	Richard Langridge	23 August 1989
Cast: Peter Bayliss, Dilys Laye, Clive Merrison, John Turner, Eleanor David, Nigel Hawthorne, Alan Rickman, Iain Cuthbertson, Harold Innocent and Peter Jeffrey
44	8	"Beyond the Pale"	Diarmuid Lawrence	William Trevor	Robert Cooper	30 August 1989
Cast: Prunella Scales, Annette Crosbie, Robert Lang, Ronald Hines, Jeff Rawle, James Greene, Doreen Hepburn, Barbara Adair and Ann Forsythe
45	9	"The Hen House"	Danny Boyle	Frank McGuinness	Robert Cooper	6 September 1989
Cast: Sinead Cusack, Tony Doyle, Barry Birch, Pat Leavy, Eleanor Methven, Nathan Carr, Darryl Carr, Maria McDermottroe, Colm Carlin, Domhnall Carlin and Noel Magee
46	10	"Seeing in the Dark"	Gareth Jones	Allen Drury	George Faber	13 September 1989
Cast: David Threlfall, Sylvestra Le Touzel, Greg Hicks, Jane Bertish, Maurice Denham, Janet Steel, Stewart Bevan, Sam Howard, Symond Lawes and Giles Newington
47	11	"A Small Mourning"	Chris Bernard	Martyn Hesford	George Faber	20 September 1989
Cast: Alison Steadman, Stratford Johns, Ian Deam, Catherine Ivie, Elizabeth Bradley, Tina Earl, Pauline Yates, Dinah Handley, Celia Gore-Booth, Alan Bird, Elizabeth Crawford, Pat Mills and Sheldon Goodinson

=== Series 5 (1990) ===
No. overall	No. in series	Title	Directed by	Written by	Producer	Original release date
48	1	"Amongst Barbarians"	Jane Howell	Michael Wall	Richard Langridge	11 July 1990
Cast: David Jason, Rowena Cooper, Anne Carroll, Lee Ross, Con O'Neill, Kathy Burke, Josephine Welcome, Madhav Sharma, Ricardo Sibelo and Anthony Smee
49	2	"Antonia and Jane"	Beeban Kidron	Marcy Kahan	George Faber	18 July 1990
Cast: Imelda Staunton, Saskia Reeves, Brenda Bruce, Bill Nighy, Ian Redford, Allan Corduner, Richard Hope and Iain Cuthbertson
50	3	"Night Voice"	Richard Spence	Dave Sheasby	John Chapman	25 July 1990
Cast: Alexei Sayle, Kevin Whately, Ruth Sheen, Leslie Sharp, Ian Mercer, Neil Dudgeon, Tim Barker, Sam Kelly, Rachel Bell, Gary Beadle, Barbara Hicks, Danny Schiller, Shirley Stelfox, Noreen Kershaw, Ingrid Wells, Stefan Escreet, David Boyce, Darren Scott, Tom Craig, Jan Alphonse, Chris Hargreaves, Sharon Muircroft, Kelly Breakell, Ray Ashcroft, Kathy Jamieson and Dinah Handley
51	4	"The Englishman's Wife"	Robert Cooper	Holly Chandler	Robert Cooper	1 August 1990
Cast: Imelda Staunton, Adrian Dunbar, Denys Hawthorne, Laura Hill, Trevor Moore, Alan Devlin, Shane Connaughton, Gary Walker, Louis Rolston, Chris Samsworth, Conleth Hill, Sean Doherty and Michael Doherty
52	5	"The Land of Dreams"	Diarmuid Lawrence	Allan Cubitt	Colin Ludlow	8 August 1990
Cast: Antony Sher, Patrick Shai, Rudi Davies, Ian Bartholomew, Tamara Hinchco, Antony Carrick, Nathan Dambuza Mdledle, Ewen Cummins, Jude Akuwudike, Chris Stanton and Joe Wenbourne
53	6	"Keeping Tom Nice"	Louise Panton	Lucy Gannon	Ruth Caleb	15 August 1990
Cast: John Alderton, Gwen Taylor, Linus Roache, Henrietta Bess, Sean Chapman and Ann Curthoys
54	7	"A Safe House"	Moira Armstrong	Bill Morrison	N/A	22 August 1990
Cast: Maggie Shevlin, Gary Lilburn, James Coyle, Dan Gordon, Niall Cusack, Gerard O'Hare, Patrick O'Kane, James Matthews, Peter Ferdinando, P J Nicholas, Scott Riley, Annatt Bass, Lousie Kattenhorn, Lauren Martin, Victoria Aked, Fleur Fekkes, Christian Robinson, Mia Callow, Jonathan Stratt, Jeffrey Robert, Ian Thompson, Harold Saks, Tony Stephens, Michael Dalton, Barrie Ewart, Tony O'Callaghan, Al Gregg, Richard Pescud, Christopher Driscoll, Mark Shelley, Nicholas Jeune, Derek Anders and Sarah Whitlock
55	8	"Afters"	Malcolm McKay	Polly Teale	Paul Uster	29 August 1990
Cast: Jimmy Jewel, Constance Chapman and Natasha Williams
56	9	"Wedded"	Malcolm McKay	Jim Cartwright	Paul Uster	29 August 1990
Cast: Sean Bean, Lesley Sharp and Melanie Thaw
57	10	"Available Light"	Bob Bentley	Robert Smith	Tatiana Kennedy	5 September 1990
Cast: Tom Bell, Joely Richardson, David Morrissey, Tiga Adams and Louisa Wooff
58	11	"Needle"	Gillies MacKinnon	Jimmy McGovern	George Faber	12 September 1990
Cast: Sean McKee, Emma Bird, Pete Postlethwaite, Anna Keaveney, John Bennett, Paul Barber, Gary Mavers, Stephen Walters, Arthur Kelly, Andrew Schofield, John Conteh, Carleen Ann Lundon, Thomas Branch, Paul Broughton, Tim Barlow, Vincent Maguire, Ina Clough and Chris Darwin
59	12	"Traitors"	Malcolm McKay	Jimmy McGovern	Simon Passmore	5 November 1990
Cast: Anton Lesser, Geoffrey Hutchings, Tim Woodward, Jonathan Phillips, David Sibley, Cyril Shaps, Ian Brimble, John Southworth, David Foxxe, Gerrard McArthur, David Chittenden, Paraic Cullen, Metin Marlow, and David Cooper NB: Although not billed as an episode of ScreenPlay in the Radio Times, it was as such - or as a "Screenplay Special" - in some newspaper listings, and started with the contemporary series title sequence
60	13	"Shoot the Revolution"	Jane Howell	Peter Flannery	George Faber	16 December 1990
Cast: Bernard Hill, Bob Peck, Freddie Jones, Sorcha Cusack, Iain Cuthbertson, Dido Miles, Trevor Peacock, Matyelok Gibbs, Ralph Nossek, Pauline Letts, Roland Oliver, Lee Ross, Jonathan Firth, Morris Perry, Michael Graham Cox and David Graham
61	14	"August Saturday"	Diarmuid Lawrence	William Trevor	Robert Cooper	29 December 1990
Cast: Sorcha Cusack, Tim McInnerny, Barry McGovern, John Kavanagh, Bairbre Ni Chaoimh, Peter Caffrey, Martina Stanley, Bosco Hogan, Rynagh O'Grady, Tony Rohr, Stephanie Fayerman, Maria McDermottroe, John Grillo, Brigid Erin Bates, Tom Hickey, Fidelma O'Dowda, Garvan McGrath, Karen O'Shea, Noel McGee and Carmel McDonnell

=== Series 6 (1991) ===
No. overall	No. in series	Title	Directed by	Written by	Producer	Original release date
62	1	"Redemption"	Malcolm McKay	Malcolm McKay	George Faber	3 July 1991
Cast: Tom Courtenay, Malcolm Storry, Lindsay Duncan, Miranda Richardson, Nick Moran, Liza Walker, Chloe Bates, Oliver Cotton, Trevor Cooper, Frank Mills and John Southworth
63	2	"Broke"	Alan Dossor	Stephen Bill	Barry Hanson	10 July 1991
Cast: Timothy Spall, Sheila Kelley, Larry Lamb, Susan Wooldridge, Leo Bill, Rosie Bill, Laura Dixon, Arthur Whybrow, Hilda Fenemore, Thomas Wheatley, Carole Harrison, Graham Weston, Peter Wear, Pauline Cory, Davyd Harries, Bharti Patel, Kenneth Hadley, Brian Portsmouth, Kathryn Hurlbutt and Shahnaz Pakravan
64	3	"Events at Drimaghleen"	Robert Cooper	William Trevor	Robert Cooper	17 July 1991
Cast: T. P. McKenna, Sophie Ward, Hugh Fraser, Nick Dunning, Kate Binchy, Pat Laffan, John Kavanagh, Maeve Connelly, Gary Walker and Barbara Adair
65	4	"The Fallout Guy"	Paul Tickell	John Random	Caroline Oulton	24 July 1991
Cast: Lou Hirsch, Amanda Boxer, Eugene Lipinski, Maria Charles, Joe Melia, Lex Van Delden, Nicolas Colicos, Mitch Webb and James Tillitt
66	5	"Murder in Oakland"	Karl Francis	Karl Francis	Peter Goodchild and Ruth Kenley-Letts	31 July 1991
Cast: Ving Rhames, Lili Bernard, Lonnie Ford, Algin Ford, Brenda Callahan, Eriq La Salle, Mollie McAllister, Carol Little, Hansford Prince, Michael McFall, Edmond Johnson, Kenneth Crow, James Brooks, Deborah Garrett and Kevin Hope
67	6	"Came Out, It Rained, Went Back in Again"	Betsan Morris Evans	Claire Dowie	N/A	7 August 1991
Cast: Jane Horrocks, Gwen Taylor, Janine Duvitski and Serena Evans
68	7	"Oranges and Lemons"	David Yates	Kay Adshead	N/A	7 August 1991
Cast: Olusola Oyeleye
69	8	"The Missing Finger"	Simon Cellan Jones	Nick Stafford	N/A	7 August 1991
Cast: Treva Etienne and Adjuna Andoh
70	9	"One Day"	Ian Potts	Helen Edmundson	N/A	7 August 1991
Cast: Kate Byers
71	10	"Paint"	Laura Sims	Kathy Page	N/A	7 August 1991
Cast: Ray Winstone and Jenny Jules
72	11	"The Hour of the Lynx"	Stuart Burge	Per Olov Enquist translated by Kim Dambaek	Colin Ludlow	14 August 1991
Cast: Simon Donald, Sylvestra Le Touzel and Eleanor Bron
73	12	"Clubland"	Laura Sims	Nick Perry	Chris Parr	28 August 1991
Cast: Paul Bhattacharjee, David Morrissey, Ruth Sheen, Daniel Webb, Laura Favali, Laurence Cote, Al Fiorentini, Laurence Bouvard, Kristin Zachariassen and Sarah Martin
74	13	"Arise and Go Now"	Danny Boyle	Owen O'Neill	Paul Lister	4 September 1991
Cast: John Kavanagh, Michael Liebmann, Tony Doyle, Jim Norton, Ian Bannen, Peter Caffrey, Sean Caffrey and Birdy Sweeney
75	14	"Message to Major"	Francis Gerard	Pieter-Dirk Uys	Francis Gerard	11 September 1991
Cast: Pieter-Dirk Uys
76	15	"Journey to Knock"	David Wheatley	William Ivory	George Faber	18 September 1991
Cast: John Hurt, David Thewlis, Charles Simon, Mal Whyte, Patrick Laffan, Geraldine Plunkett, Joan O'Hara and Birdy Sweeney

=== Series 7 (1992) ===
No. overall	No. in series	Title	Directed by	Written by	Producer	Original release date
77	1	"The Countess Alice"	Moira Armstrong	Allan Cubitt	Colin Ludlow	1 July 1992
Cast: Wendy Hiller, Zoë Wanamaker, Duncan Bell, Patricia Quinn, Lucinda Fisher, Sylvia Barter, Madge Ryan, Chris Stanton, Martin Wimbush, Hannah Cresswell, Terence Donovan, Sarah Crowden and Jane van Hool
78	2	"Force of Duty"	Pat O'Connor	Bill Morrison and Chris Ryder	Robert Cooper	8 July 1992
Cast: Donal McCann, Adrian Dunbar, Patrick Malahide, Ingrid Craigie, John Linehan, Michelle Fairley, Jim Corry, Catherine Brennan, Michael McKnight, Tim Loane, Carol Brown, Kristin Neely, Barry Birch, Sean Caffrey, Ethna Roddy, Paula McFetridge, BJ Hogg, Dan Gordon and Eileen Pollock
79	3	"Bad Girl"	George Case	Guy Hibbert	David Thompson; Josephine Ward	15 July 1992
Cast: Jane Horrocks, Lesley Manville, Nicholas Woodeson, Tom Beard, Todd Boyce, David Bradley and Carol MacReady
80	4	"Bitter Harvest"	Simon Cellan Jones	Charles Pattinson and Winsome Pinnock	Charles Pattinson	22 July 1992
Cast: Josette Simon, Sue Johnston, Yul Vazquez, Rudolph Walker, Tomas Milian, Juan M Almonte and Juanita Ageh
81	5	"Man to Man"	John Maybury	Manfred Karge	James Mackay	29 July 1992
Cast: Tilda Swinton
82	6	"Death and the Compass"	Alex Cox	Jorge Luis Borges (story); Alex Cox	Karl H Braun	5 August 1992
Cast: Peter Boyle, Miguel Sandoval, Christopher Eccleston, Pedro Armendariz and Alonso Echanove
83	7	"Buying a Landslide"	Simon Curtis	David Edgar	Chris Parr	2 September 1992
Cast: Griffin Dunne, John Mahoney, Ron Vawter, Lisa Arrindell, Peter Gallagher, Mason Adams, Ron Rifkin and Christine Baranski
84	8	"Springing Lenin"	Andrei Nekrasov	Patricia Hannah	Tatiana Kennedy	9 September 1992
Cast: Geraldine McEwan
85	9	"Business with Friends"	Uwe Janson	David Spencer	Tatiana Kennedy	9 September 1992
Cast: Christopher Eccleston and Adie Allen
86	10	"Can't Stop Me Dreaming"	Bernard Rudden	Bernard Rudden	Tatiana Kennedy	9 September 1992
Cast: Marion van Thyn and Walter van Dyk
87	11	"A Little Bit of Lippy"	Chris Bernard	Martyn Hesford	George Faber	16 September 1992
Cast: Kenneth Cranham, Rachel Davies, Alison Swann, Danny Cunningham, Elizabeth Bradley, Bette Bourne, Tina Earl and Cliff Howells
88	12	"Dread Poets' Society"	Andy Wilson	David Stafford and Benjamin Zephaniah	Estelle Daniel	23 September 1992
Cast: Benjamin Zephaniah, Timothy Spall, Alex Jennings, Alan Cumming, Emma Fielding and Dexter Fletcher
89	13	"Small Metal Jacket"	Steve Hilliker	Emily Prager (story); Scott Roberts	Caroline Oulton	23 September 1992
Cast: Debora Weston, Toshie Ogura, Marie Theodore, Jana Shelden, Tracy Thorne, Laurel Lefkow, Abigail Canton, Benedict Wong, Vincent Wong, Basil Ho-Yen, Kris Emmerson and Peter Banks
90	14	"You, Me and Marley"	Richard Spence	Graham Reid	Chris Parr	30 September 1992
Cast: Marc Oshea, Bronagh Gallagher, Michael Liebmann, Emma Moylan, Marie Jones, Catherine Brennan, Stella McCusker, Frank Grimes, Lorcan Cranitch, James Greene, Ian McElhinney, John Keegan, George Shane, BJ Hogg, Peter Ferris and Peter Taggart Awards: Michael Powell Award for best British film at Edinburgh International Film Festival 1992

=== Series 8 (1993) ===
No. overall	No. in series	Title	Directed by	Written by	Producer	Original release date
91	1	"Love Lies Bleeding"	Michael Winterbottom	Ronan Bennett	Robert Cooper	22 September 1993
Cast: Mark Rylance, Elizabeth Bourgine, John Kavanagh, Brendan Gleeson, Tony Doyle, Robert Patterson, George Shane, James Nesbitt, Emma Jordan, Stuart Graham, Tim Loane, James Durrell, Michael Liebmann, Bosco Hogan, Margaret D'Arcy, Paula Hamilton and Victoria Jameson
92	2	"The Merrihill Millionaires"	Les Blair	Rob Ritchie	Lynn Horsford	29 September 1993
Cast: Stephen Rea, John Bowler, John McGlynn, Steve Huison, Glenn Cunningham, Simon Ashley, Elizabeth Mickery, Barbara Horne, Shelagh Fraser, William Ivory, Steve Halliwell, Ian Dunn, Kerrie Plowman, Julia Ford, Jon Croft, Philip David, Chris Collings and Al T Kossy
93	3	"The Vision Thing"	Pedr James	Mark Lawson	Charles Pattinson	6 October 1993
Cast: Richard Wilson, Derek Jacobi, Nathaniel Parker, Kenneth Cranham, Catherine Russell, Nicholas Farrell, Clive Russell, Phyllida Sewell, Liz Kettle, Christopher Fulford, Albie Woodington, Lennox Greaves, Gerald Sim, Lisa Bowerman, Dale Rapley, Marilyn Finlay, Anne Marie Marriott, Richard Dixon, Alastair Campbell, Martin Young and Hamish McColl
94	4	"Safe"	Antonia Bird	Al Ashton	David M Thompson	13 October 1993
Cast: Kate Hardie, Aidan Gillen, George Costigan, Andrew Tiernan, Steven Mackintosh, Robert Carlyle, Carol Leader, Neil Smals, Cheryl Maiker, Marc O'Shea, Kevin Walsh and Louise Heaney
95	5	"Not Even God Is Wise Enough"	Danny Boyle	Biyi Bandele-Thomas	Colin Ludlow	20 October 1993
Cast: Paterson Joseph, Vivienne McKone, Ellen Thomas, Mona Hammond, Doyle Richmond, Mark Strong, Trevor Bowen, Kevin Allen and Ben Thomas
96	6	"Boswell and Johnson's Tour of the Western Isles"	John Byrne	John Byrne	Nick Barton	27 October 1993
Cast: Robbie Coltrane, John Sessions, Leo Sho-Silva, Celia Imrie, Tony Halfpenny, Alan David, Carol MacReady, Joanne Thirsk, Penelope McGhie, Mark Anstee, Ian Dury and Donald MacNeill

== Home media releases ==
The following episodes of the series were included in separate editions of BBC Video World, a fortnightly subscription-only service – primarily for expatriates – that delivered a three-hour selection of BBC programming on VHS cassettes:

- Starlings - Vol. 1 No. 1 (April 1989)
- The Englishman's Wife - Vol. 2 No. 18 (September 1990)
- Available Light - Vol. 2 No. 22 (October 1990)
- Afters - Vol. 2 No. 23 (November 1990)

== Notable productions ==
- Cariani and the Courtesans (1987)
- You, Me & Marley (1992)
