= The Inheritor (novel) =

1930 novel

- First US edition
- Author: E.F. Benson
- Language: English
- Genre: Mystery
- Publisher: Hutchinson (London); Doubleday, Doran (New York)
- Publication date: 1930
- Publication place: United Kingdom
- Media type: Print

The Inheritor is a 1930 mystery novel by the British writer E. F. Benson, best known as the author of the Mapp and Lucia series. Like his earlier 1901 novel The Luck of the Vails it revolves around a curse plaguing a wealthy family. While that had downplayed the supernatural elements in favour of a crime approach The Inheritor, one of his final works, was more ambiguous.

== Synopsis ==
A long-standing curse hangs over the Gervase family for generations, but unexpectedly the current heir Cambridge University student Stephen Gervase appears normal and untouched by the spell.

== Bibliography ==
- Joshi, S. T. Icons of Horror and the Supernatural: An Encyclopaedia of Our Worst Nightmares, Volume 1. Greenwood Publishing Group, 2007.
- Masters, Brian. The Life of E.F. Benson. Chatto & Windus, 1991.
- Palmer, Geoffrey & Lloyd, Noel. E.F. Benson - As He Was. Lennard, 1988.
- Reilly, John M. Twentieth Century Crime & Mystery Writers. Springer, 2015.
