= Strange Days on Planet Earth =

Strange Days on Planet Earth is a four-part (1 hour each) television program on PBS concerning human impact on the environment. It is narrated by Edward Norton. The show was produced by Sea Studios Foundation. Strange Days on Planet Earth grew into an ongoing partnership with the National Geographic Society to bring focus on our personal connection to the planet's life systems.

The series were broadcast on PBS to over 12 million viewers in the U.S. and millions more in Europe, Latin America, Australia, and New Zealand. In 2007–2008, the Strange Days initiative focused on the global issues facing the ocean, under the name Strange Days Ocean.

== Episodes ==
1. Invaders (invasive species and their ecological and economic impacts)
2. The One Degree Factor (climate change, drought in Africa, dust clouds over the Atlantic, and respiratory problems in Trinidad)
3. Predators (the role that predators play in natural ecosystems)
4. Troubled Waters (polluted waters and their effects around the world)

== Awards ==
The series earned 14 major film festival honors, including

- Best Series at 2005 International Wildlife Film Festival, the environmental equivalent of the Academy Awards,
- "Best" in Field Research and Scientific Exploration at The 2005 Explorers Club Documentary Film Festival,
- Greenpeace Environmental Award at the 2005 Linden Wildlife Film Festival,
- Panda Award at the 2004 Wildscreen Film Festival,
- "Best People and Animals" award at the 2004 Jackson Hole Wildlife Film Festival,
- "Best Environment and Conservation Series" at the 2005 Japan Wildlife Film Festival,
- 2004 Planet Award
