= Business with Friends =

- ScreenPlay episode
- Episode no.: Series 7 Episode 9
- Directed by: Uwe Janson
- Written by: David Spencer
- Original air date: 9 September 1992

Episode chronology
← Previous "Springing Lenin"	Next → "Can't Stop Me Dreaming"

Business with Friends was a 1992 British television drama, directed by Uwe Janson and written by David Spencer. Its cast included Adie Allen and Christopher Eccleston. It broadcast on BBC2 as the ninth episode of the seventh series of the anthology series ScreenPlay, on 9 September 1992.

== Cast ==
- Christopher Eccleston as Angel Morris
- Adie Allen as Coral
- Heino Ferch as Rainer
- Ernst Stötzner as Thiele
- Aleksander Trąbczyński as Tomek
- Joachim Schönfeld as Longhair
- Hussi Kutlucan as Turkish man
- Jale Arıkan as Turkish woman
