= Paying Guests (novel) =

1929 novel

- First US edition
- Author: E.F. Benson
- Language: English
- Genre: Comedy
- Publisher: Hutchinson (London); Doubleday (New York)
- Publication date: 1929
- Publication place: United Kingdom
- Media type: Print

Paying Guests is a 1929 comedy novel by the British writer E. F. Benson, best known as the author of the Mapp and Lucia series. The story takes place at Wentworth, a boarding house in the fictional resort town of Bolton Spa. It focuses on the eccentric collection of summer residents, mostly there to try and recover their health, overseen by the domineering former Indian Army Colonel Chase. According to a pair of critics, "The coming together of character and situation in Paying Guests creates a comic masterpiece, worthy to stand alongside the Mapp and Lucia books".

== Television adaptation ==
In 1986, a two-part adaptation was made as part of the BBC's Screenplay anthology series, with a cast featuring Robert Hardy, Angela Thorne and Richard O'Callaghan.

== Bibliography ==
- Masters, Brian. The Life of E.F. Benson. Chatto & Windus, 1991.
- Palmer, Geoffrey & Lloyd, Noel. E.F. Benson - As He Was. Lennard, 1988.
- Reilly, John M. Twentieth Century Crime & Mystery Writers. Springer, 2015.
- Stringer, Jenny & Sutherland, John. The Oxford Companion to Twentieth-century Literature in English. Oxford University Press, 1996.
