= Malcolm McKay (writer) =

British writer and director (born 1947)

- Born: July 12, 1947 (age 79); Epping, London
- Education: Chelmsford and Canley College of Education
- Occupations: Academic, novelist
- Children: 2, including Nellie McKay

Malcolm McKay (born 12 July 1947) is a British writer and director.

== Early life ==
McKay was born in Epping, London. He studied at St Joseph's Convent primary, King Edward V1 Grammar, Chelmsford and Canley College of Education, Coventry. He qualified as a teacher in 1969 and began a career in the theatre soon after.

== Novels ==
He has published four novels: The Path, about the personal, intellectual and spiritual inter-reaction between a group of international travelers on the Camino de Santiago; The Lack Brothers, a journey by three brothers in search of their mother through a mythologised London of the last fifty years, published by Transworld; Breaking Up, depicting the financial and interior collapse of a city trader as his domestic and professional life literally goes up in flames, published by Pegasus; Thistown, a political novel for teenagers set in a mythical town somewhere in the universe which is impossible to escape from and where no-one gets older.

== Television ==
McKay has spent many years as a writer and director for television. His writing has always dealt with extreme behaviour and includes the controversial BBC play Airbase which dealt metaphorically with drug abuse on a USAF base in England. The play achieved notoriety after it was mentioned in Parliament and the Lords after Prime Minister Thatcher demanded a copy, the Chairman of the BBC, Marmaduke Hussey publicly apologised for the content, and Mary Whitehouse, of the National Viewers' and Listeners' Association, issued a second apology to President Reagan on the behalf of the British people.

McKay's work also includes the award winning A Wanted Man trilogy (Royal Television Society, best serial, Golden Chest Awards, best drama) one of the first television dramas to deal in depth with the arrest, trial and psychology of a serial killer. The Interrogation of John about the police questioning of a murder suspect (first shown in 1987) becomes the first part of the trilogy; the second part, The Secret, is about his trial; and Shoreland about his subsequent treatment concludes the trilogy.

He has made three films for the BBC as writer and director: Redemption, about a child killer, Maria's Child, the graphic description of a female dancer’s decision to abort her child and the subsequent doubts and difficulties of the process, and Cruel Train, an adaptation of Émile Zola's La Bete Humaine.

He has also directed plays by Jim Cartwright and Jimmy McGovern again for the BBC. Most recently he adapted Mervyn Peake's Gormenghast trilogy (winner New York Critics Circle award) and wrote an eight part cop show for BBC One.

== Radio ==
His radio play Etian about a woman's recovery from rape was nominated for a Prix Italia award.

== Theatre ==
McKay has written many plays for the theatre including Yellowbacks, a dystopian take on the AIDS epidemic; Harry Mixture about a South London gangster; Pistols which describes the final hours of the punk band; Renaissence, an insight into the mental collapse of a lawyer as his family breaks up around him; The People's Temple details the slow descent of the Californian cult into paranoia and mass suicide; Forgotten Voices, an adaptation of the best-selling oral history of the first world war for the Edinburgh Festival.

== Personal life ==
McKay is the father of singer Nellie McKay and author Alice Clark-Platts.
