= Secret Lives (novel) =

1932 novel

- First edition (US)
- Author: E. F. Benson
- Language: English
- Genre: Comedy
- Publisher: Hodder and Stoughton (London); Doubleday Doran (New York)
- Publication date: 1932
- Publication place: United Kingdom
- Media type: Print

Secret Lives is a 1932 comedy novel by the British writer E. F. Benson, best known as the author of the Mapp and Lucia series. The structure is broadly similar to that series, featuring two strong-willed women battling for social supremacy in the fictitious Durham Square in Edwardian London.

Margaret Mantrip is the queen bee of a garden square in London, reigning over the various inhabitants. When Susan Leg, a mysterious new resident arrives, it threatens to upset her carefully-ordered world. Little known to her is the fact that the newcomer is secretly the author of a series of trashy but bestselling novels under the pen name Rudolph Da Vinci.

"This fabulous comedy of manners is about the residents of Durham Square, which is a respectable if not totally fashionable London address. We see their snobberies, their quarrels and reconciliations, and we discover that one of the residents of the square has been writing hugely popular romantic trash under the name of Rudolph da Vinci. There’s a memorable cast of strong-willed women, an eccentric Vicar, an admirable butler, and some Pekinese dogs. This novel is laugh-out-loud funny!" - Susannah Fullerton, The International Heyer Society

"Can a woman who puts caviar on her scones be altogether respectable? This deliciously ironic novel reveals all the hilarious intrigues and intimacies of life upstairs (and downstairs) in one of the stateliest squares of England." - Strand Bookstore

"Riddled with curiosity, mordant pen in hand, E F Benson draws aside the plush velvet drapes in Durham Square - and reveals in this deliciously ironic novel all the hilarious intrigues and intimacies of life upstairs and downstairs in one of the stateliest squares in England." - Fantastic Fiction

== BBC Radio adaptation ==
On 19 September 2011, BBC Radio 4 Extra began re-broadcasting Secret Lives by EF Benson, from an earlier commission by the BBC Radio.

== Sources ==
- Masters, Brian. The Life of E. F. Benson. Chatto & Windus, 1991.
- Palmer, Geoffrey & Lloyd, Noel. E. F. Benson - As He Was. Lennard, 1988.
- Reilly, John M. Twentieth Century Crime & Mystery Writers. Springer, 2015.
