= David Blaize =

1916 novel by E. F. Benson

- Author: E. F. Benson
- Language: English
- Publisher: Hodder & Stoughton (UK); George H. Doran (US)
- Publication date: 1916
- Publication place: England

David Blaize is a novel of school life by English author Edward Frederic Benson. The first edition was published in 1916 by Hodder and Stoughton, London.

Set in England before World War I, the novel describes David's years at prep school and public school, his studies, sports and friendships, and finally, his brush with death when he stops a runaway horse. Central to the plot is David's intense, but non-physical homoerotic romance (styled as a romantic friendship) with Frank Maddox, a head boy at public school.

== Sequels ==
A second novel, David Blaize and the Blue Door, set in David's early childhood, was published in 1918. In contrast to the first book, it is a fantasy in the style of Alice's Adventures in Wonderland, set in a dream landscape permeated with nonsense.

David of King's (published in the United States as David Blaize of King's) is Benson's 1924 sequel to David Blaize. It follows David's university career at King's College, Cambridge. It was also re-published in 2010 with a new introduction and literary notes by Dr. Craig Paterson for Viewforth Press.
