= Sea Studios Foundation =

Sea Studios Foundation is a 501(c)3 non-profit organization, headquartered in Monterey, California. Sea Studios was founded by Mark Shelley, a senior series producer for National Geographic. It is a team of filmmakers, scientists and public opinion leaders dedicated to raising public awareness and creating action on issues involving the planet’s health and sustainable development worldwide.

In 2001, in collaboration with the National Geographic Society, Sea Studios produced The Shape of Life, an eight-hour special that focuses on the evolution of the animal kingdom and animal biodiversity. It combines a science-based content with pioneering techniques in underwater and deep-sea filmmaking. The Shape of Life earned several major film festival honors, including "Best Scientific Content" and "Finalist" at the 2003 International Wildlife Film Festival; the 2003 CINE Golden Eagle Award, for Episode 2 and Episode 6; "Semi-finalist" at the 2003 Animal Behavior Society Film Festival; "Best of Monterey" at the 2003 Access Monterey Peninsula Edgar Kennedy Awards.

Sea Studios' Strange Days on Planet Earth initiative has ongoing partnership with the National Geographic Society. It began as a four-part television series in 2005, hosted by Edward Norton. The series earned 14 major film festival honors, including Best Series at 2005 International Wildlife Film Festival, the environmental equivalent of the OSCARS, "Best" in Field Research and Scientific Exploration at The 2005 Explorers Club Documentary Film Festival, the Greenpeace Environmental Award at the 2005 Linden Wildlife Film Festival, the prestigious Panda Award at the 2004 Wildscreen Film Festival, "Best People and Animals" award at the 2004 Jackson Hole Wildlife Film Festival and many more.

In 2008, Sea Studios Foundation launched a massive 360 campaign, named "Think Beyond Plastics", to raise awareness of the implications of overuse of plastic. The campaign is run by Daniella Russo and was awarded Best 360 campaign at 2009 Jackson Hole Film Festival.
