= The Man Who Went Too Far =

Short story by E. F. Benson

- Short story by E. F. Benson
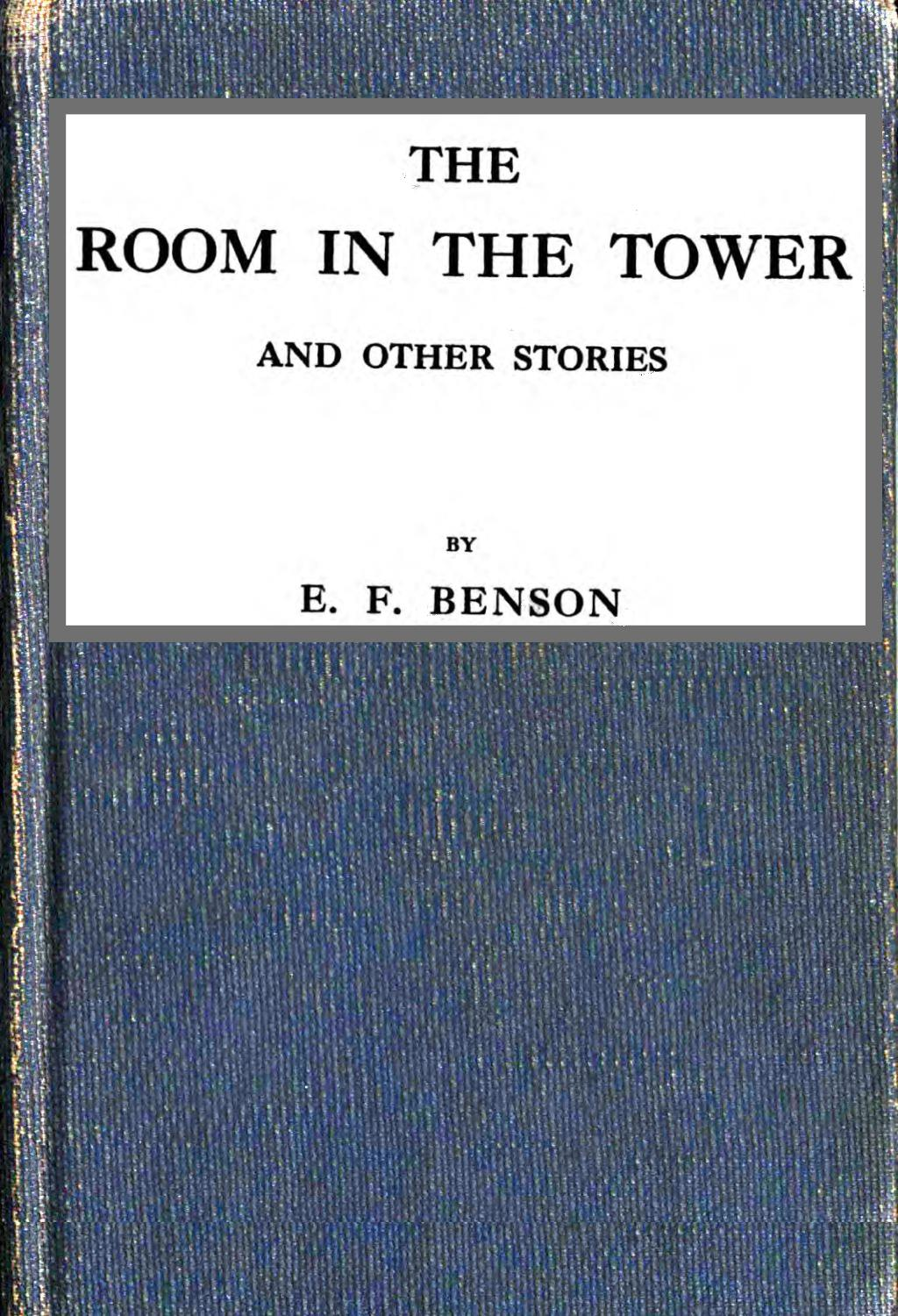
- The front cover of The Room in the Tower and Other Stories.

Text available at Wikisource
- Country: United Kingdom
- Language: English
- Genres: ghost story, horror

Publication
- Published in: The Room in the Tower and Other Stories
- Publication type: short story
- Publisher: Mills & Boon (first edition)
- Media type: Print
- Publication date: 1912

Chronology
The Bus-Conductor	Between the Lights

"The Man Who Went Too Far" is a short work of supernatural fiction by E. F. Benson, collected in his The Room in the Tower, and Other Stories (1912).

== Summary ==
"The Man Who Went Too Far" features allusions to Greek mythology in Pan, the god of nature and rustic music. Its titular character, Frank, is an English gentleman, who connects with nature through a rejection of Christian orthodoxy and embracing of neopaganism. His spiritual journey is defined as a denial of pain and a search for joy: by connecting with nature and rejecting ideas of self-denial and painful asceticism, Frank's body is rejuvenated. He is granted a measure of control over and kinship with the flora and fauna which surround him. However, this path leads him into danger when he encounters a strange spirit, believed by Frank to be Pan, in the woods near his home.

The story is told by an unnamed narrator repeating a story told to him by Frank's artist friend, Darcy, who witnesses the ultimate, terrifying climax of Frank's revelation. It is set in a village that is richly described by the narrator, including in the opening section, which introduces the village where Frank lives and its particular environment.

== Place in the history of horror fiction ==
The use of Pan in horror fiction from the late-19th and 20th centuries has often been negative. In Benson's story, while neopaganism gives Frank a joyful perception of reality, powers approaching mysticism, and a fountain of youth (in Benson's words, he has the appearance of a "beardless lad" - a Greek expression - despite being thirty-five), in the end, as the title suggests, he goes "too far". Pan is identified with a Satanic entity, being a goat which dances on its hind legs, terrifying those villagers who witness it at night among the trees. (The reason given as to why locals, Frank excepted, stay away from the woods at night.)

These elements - of Pan as Satanic and neopaganism as a dangerous path - place "The Man Who Went Too Far" in a horror tradition with The Great God Pan (1890), a novella by Arthur Machen. Frank's obsession with hearing the music of Pan (who in mythology is depicted as playing a flute) and finally seeing him, which he believes will be a transcendent moment, is similar to the work of the character Dr. Raymond in Machen's novella. Raymond conducts scientific experiments with the aim of "seeing the great god Pan".

Echoes of this tradition can be traced to relatively recent stories, like horror writer Stephen King's 1975 piece "The Lawnmower Man". In this story, Pan is alluded to as the head of a sort of cult, which the titular character, a professional gardener, belongs to. Unlike in Benson's and Machen's stories, where the main characters were brought down by their own hubris in approaching Pan, the hero of "The Lawnmower Man" is punished for rejecting Pan's servant, the gardener, clinging instead to the rational, everyday world. Nonetheless, King depicts Pan as a dark and savage (though not necessarily Satanic) entity.

== Commentary ==
In his seminal essay on weird fiction, "Supernatural Horror in Literature", horror writer H. P. Lovecraft spoke positively of "The Man Who Went Too Far" and Benson's work in the genre in general, describing the author as "an important contributor" to the faring of the weird short story.

A 2016 Vintage Classics selection of Benson's ghost stories was introduced by writer and actor Mark Gatiss. He mentions "The Man Who Went Too Far" (included in the book) as hinting at Benson's "fascination with an ancient and dangerous pagan sensibility."
