= David of King's =

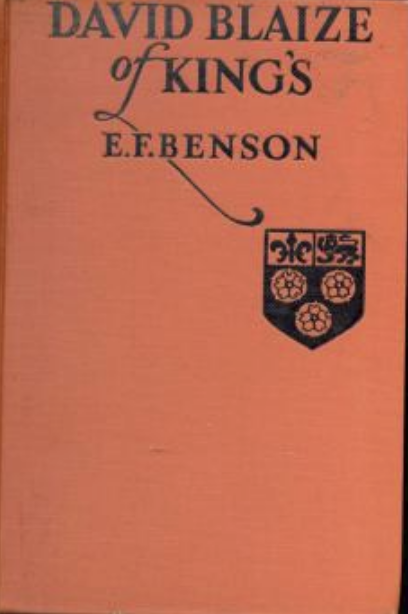
First edition (USA)

David of King's is a novel by Edward Frederic Benson. The first edition was published in 1924. It was published by London, New York [etc.] : Hodder and Stoughton.

David of King's (published in the USA as David Blaize of King's) is Benson's sequel to his earlier novel David Blaize. The book deals with the story of David Blaize's three years as an undergraduate at King's College, Cambridge.
