= The Blotting Book =

1908 novel

- First US edition
- Author: E.F. Benson
- Language: English
- Genre: Mystery
- Publisher: Heinemann (London); Doubleday (New York)
- Publication date: 1908
- Publication place: United Kingdom
- Media type: Print

The Blotting Book is a 1908 mystery crime novel by the British writer E. F. Benson, later better known as the author of the Mapp and Lucia series. It was one of only two ventures he made into the genre during his prolific career along with The Luck of the Vails (1901). It takes place in Brighton and the nearby South Downs.

Martin Edwards included it in his list of a hundred classic crime novels amongst a group of Edwardian mystery novels that served as a precursor to the Golden Age of Detective Fiction.

== Synopsis ==
Two lawyers have embezzled the £30,000 inheritance of Morris Assheton, recently returned from Cambridge University. They attempt to cover their tracks, but when one of them turns up dead Assheton is suspected of his murder. The case hinges around a forged letter in a blotting book.

== Bibliography ==
- Edwards, Martin. The Story of Classic Crime in 100 Books. Poisoned Pen Press, 2017,
- Hanson, Gillian Mary. City and Shore: The Function of Setting in the British Mystery. McFarland, 2015.
- Reilly, John M. Twentieth Century Crime & Mystery Writers. Springer, 2015.
- White, Terry. Justice Denoted: The Legal Thriller in American, British, and Continental Courtroom Literature. Praeger, 2003.
