= Barbara Adair =

South African writer

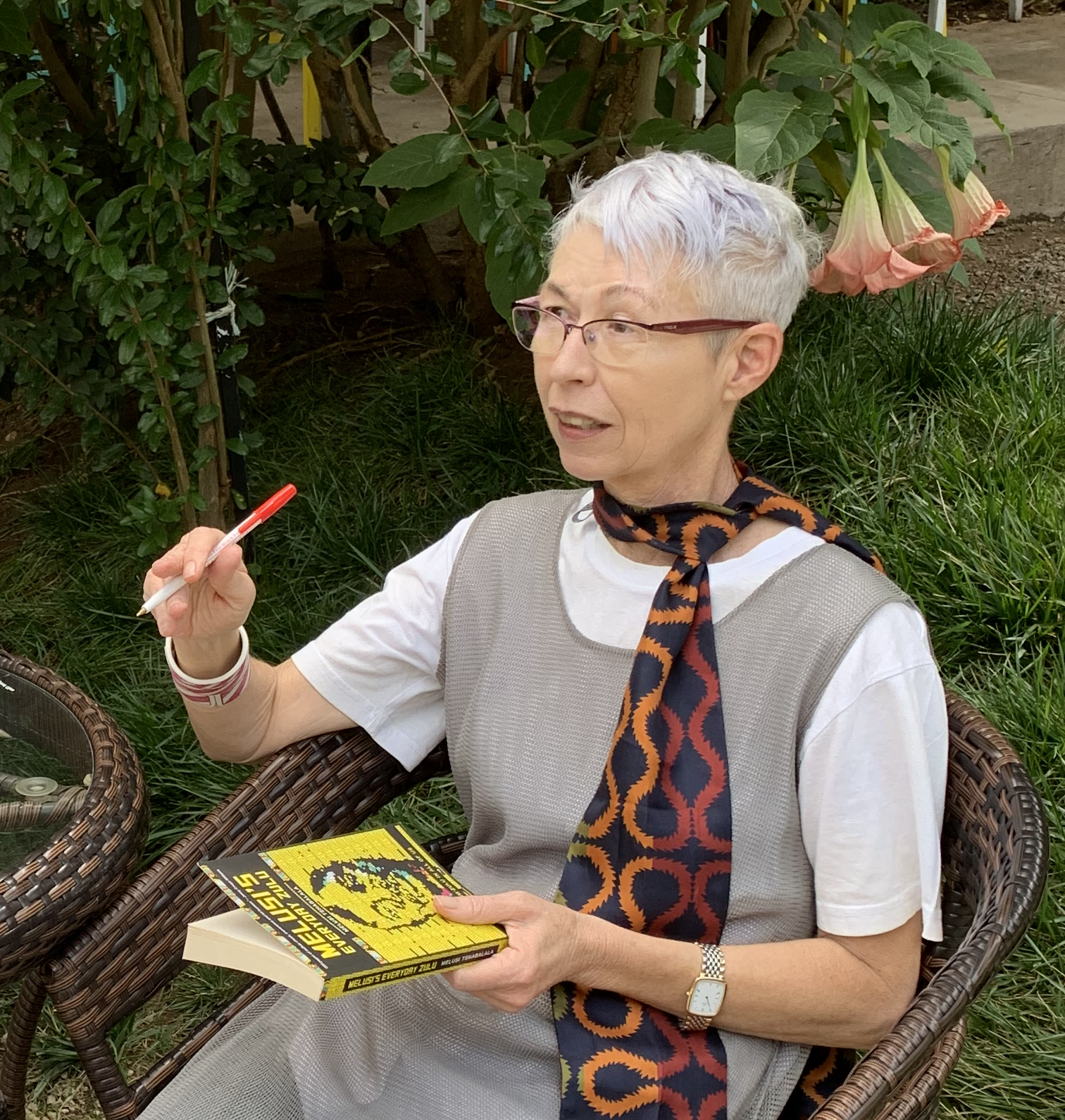
- Barbara Adair in 2020 at a discussion at Bridge Books, Johannesburg
- Occupations: Writer, lecturer
- Writing career
- Years active: 2000s–present
- Genres: Fiction, non-fiction
- Notable works: In Tangier We Killed the Blue Parrot (2005); END (2009); In the Shadow of the Springs I Saw (2023)
- Notable awards: Sunday Times Fiction Award (shortlisted, 2005); Commonwealth Book Prize – African Region (shortlisted, 2010)

Barbara Adair is a South African writer. Her 2004 novel, In Tangier We Killed the Blue Parrot, was shortlisted for the Sunday Times Literary Award, and the novel END was shortlisted for the Commonwealth Book Prize. Based in Johannesburg, she also lectures on human rights law.

== Works ==
Fiction

- In Tangier We Killed the Blue Parrot, Jacana, 2005, a fictional account of the lives of Paul Bowles and Jane Bowles in Tangier. (Short listed for the Sunday Times Fiction award, 2005. The subject of a conference paper: Urban Generations in Morocco, 2007, Cheryl Stobie: Somatics, Space, Surprise: Creative Dissonance over Time, University of KwaZulu Natal, South Africa.)
- END, Jacana, 2009, a pastiche based on the movie Casablanca set in Johannesburg and Maputo. (Short listed for the African Regional Commonwealth Prize, 2010. The subject of a PhD dissertation: Beppi Chiuppani, Beyond Political engagement? Redefining the Literary in post dictatorship Brazil and post-apartheid South Africa, University of Chicago, 2013.)

Non-fiction

- In the Shadow of the Springs I Saw, Modjaji Books, 2023, with photographs and stories of Art Deco buildings in Springs and their inhabitants.

Also, newspaper and magazine articles in: Sunday Independent (South Africa), Sunday Times (South Africa), Weekender (South Africa), Horizon (British Airways), Selamta (Ethiopian Airlines). Short Stories in: New Contrast Literary Journal (South Africa), From the Great Wall to the Grand Canyon (US publication), Queer Africa – New and Collected Fiction: A collection of Southern African short stories (winner of the LAMDA (USA) prize for collected stories.)

== Bibliography ==
- Chapman, Michael (26 March 2009). Postcolonialism: South/African Perspectives. Cambridge Scholars Publishing. ISBN 978-1-4438-0925-2.
- Martin, Karen; Xaba, Makhosazana (May 2013). Queer Africa. New and Collected Fiction. African Books Collective. ISBN 978-1-920590-33-8.
