= Uwe Janson =

German screenwriter, director and producer

Uwe Janson (born 6 November 1959, Königswinter) is a German screenwriter, director and producer. He has worked in Germany and the United Kingdom, including Business with Friends for the British Film Institute and the BBC (1991) and the British-German co-production The Sinking of the Laconia (2010; UK premiere 2011).

== Selected filmography ==
Films

- Verfolgte Wege (1989)
- Heart in the Hand (1991)
- At Night in the Park (2002)
- On the Inside (2011)
- To Life! (2014)

TV films

- Business with Friends (1992, short)
- Gefährliche Verbindung (1993)
- Lauras Entscheidung (1994)
- Nur der Sieg zählt (1995)
- Rhapsody in Blood (1998)
- Holstein Lovers (1999)
- Golden Boy (2000)
- Babykram ist Männersache (2001)
- Weihnachtsmann gesucht (2002)
- Instinct for Crime (2003)
- Baal (2004, based on Baal)
- Lulu (2006, based on Earth Spirit and Pandora's Box)
- Peer Gynt (2006, based on Peer Gynt)
- Werther (2008, based on The Sorrows of Young Werther)
- Volcano (2009)
- The Sinking of the Laconia (2010)
- Aschenputtel (2011, based on Cinderella)
- Die Schuld der Erben (2012)
- Hänsel und Gretel (2012, based on Hansel and Gretel)
- Der Minister (2013)
- Das Mädchen mit den Schwefelhölzern (2013, based on The Little Match Girl)
- Sechse kommen durch die ganze Welt (2014, based on How Six Made Their Way in the World)
- Die Schlikkerfrauen (2014)
- Die Udo Honig Story (2015)
- Reformation (2017, about Martin Luther)
