= The Luck of the Vails =

1901 novel

- First edition (UK)
- Author: E.F. Benson
- Language: English
- Genre: Mystery
- Publisher: Heinemann; Appleton (US)
- Publication date: 1901
- Publication place: United Kingdom
- Media type: Print

The Luck of the Vails is a 1901 mystery crime novel by the British writer E. F. Benson, later better known as the author of the Mapp and Lucia series. It was one of only two ventures he made into the genre during his prolific career along with The Blotting Book (1908). In his autobiography Benson numbered it as one of only four of his novels he was satisfied with.

The plot revolves around a cursed golden goblet that has been in the possession of the Vail family for generations. It largely downplays the supernatural elements in favour of traditional mystery. A later novel The Inheritor (1930) also revolved around a family curse.

== Bibliography ==
- Edwards, Martin. The Story of Classic Crime in 100 Books. Poisoned Pen Press, 2017,
- Joshi, S. T. Icons of Horror and the Supernatural: An Encyclopaedia of Our Worst Nightmares, Volume 1. Greenwood Publishing Group, 2007.
- Reilly, John M. Twentieth Century Crime & Mystery Writers. Springer, 2015.
- Weatherhead, Andrew Kingsley. Upstairs: Writers and Residences. Fairleigh Dickinson Univ Press, 2000.
