= E. F. Benson =

English novelist and writer (1867–1940)

E. F. Benson OBE
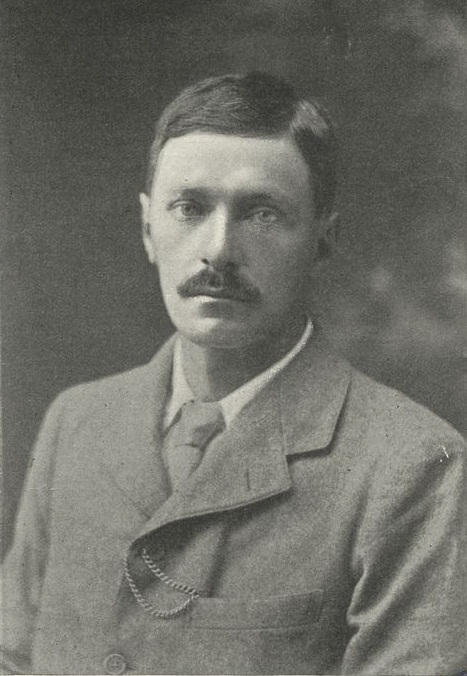
- Born: Edward Frederic Benson; 24 July 1867; Wellington College, Berkshire, England
- Died: 29 February 1940 (aged 72); University College Hospital, London, England
- Education: Kings College, Cambridge (BA)
- Occupation: Writer
- Parent(s): Edward White Benson (father); Mary Benson (mother)
- Relatives: Robert Hugh Benson (brother); A. C. Benson (brother); Margaret Benson (sister); Henry Sidgwick (uncle)
- Writing career
- Notable works: Mapp and Lucia series; Dodo series; Supernatural horror stories
- Notable awards: OBE

Edward Frederic Benson (24 July 1867 – 29 February 1940) was an English novelist, biographer, memoirist, historian and short story writer.

== Early life ==
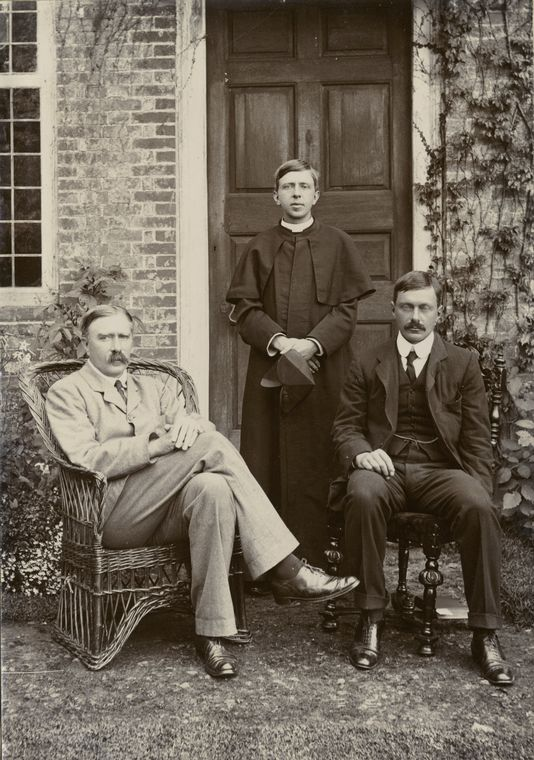
The Benson brothers, 1907.

E. F. Benson was born at Wellington College in Berkshire, the fifth child of the headmaster, Edward White Benson (later chancellor of Lincoln Cathedral, Bishop of Truro and Archbishop of Canterbury), and his wife born Mary Sidgwick ("Minnie").

E. F. Benson was the younger brother of Arthur Christopher Benson, who wrote the words to "Land of Hope and Glory"; Robert Hugh Benson, author of several novels and Roman Catholic apologetic works; and Margaret Benson (Maggie), an author and amateur Egyptologist. Two other siblings died young. Benson's parents had six children and no grandchildren.

Benson was educated at Temple Grove School, then at Marlborough College, where he wrote some of his earliest works and upon which he based his novel David Blaize. He continued his education at King's College, Cambridge. At Cambridge, he was a member of the Pitt Club, and later in life he became an honorary fellow of Magdalene College.

== Works ==
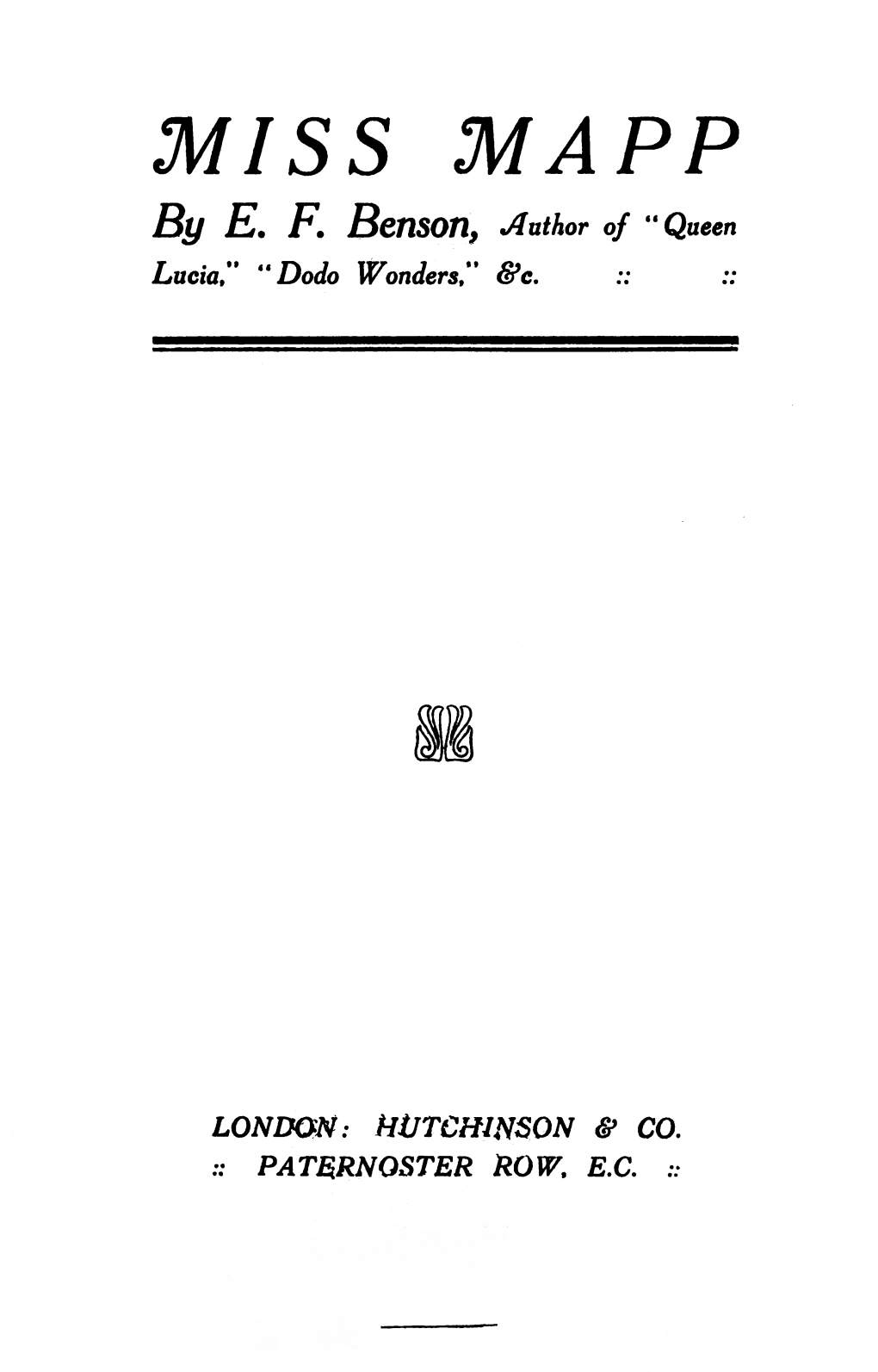
Title page of Miss Mapp, 1922.

Benson's first book was Sketches from Marlborough (1888), published while he was a student. He started his novel-writing career with the (then) fashionably controversial Dodo (1893), which was an instant success, and followed it with a variety of satire and romantic and supernatural melodrama. He repeated the success of Dodo, which featured a scathing description of composer and militant suffragette Ethel Smyth, (Note: Ethel Smyth "gleefully acknowledged" the description, according to actress Prunella Scales.) with the same cast of characters a generation later: Dodo the Second (1914), "a unique chronicle of the pre-1914 Bright Young Things" and Dodo Wonders (1921), "a first-hand social history of the Great War in Mayfair and the Shires".

The Mapp and Lucia series, written relatively late in his career, consists of six novels and two short stories. The novels are: Queen Lucia, Miss Mapp, Lucia in London, Mapp and Lucia, Lucia's Progress (published as The Worshipful Lucia in the United States) and Trouble for Lucia. The short stories are "The Male Impersonator" and "Desirable Residences". Both appear in anthologies of Benson's short stories, and the former is also often appended to the end of the novel Miss Mapp.

Benson was also known as a writer of atmospheric and at times humorous or satirical ghost stories, which often were published in story magazines such as Pearson's Magazine or Hutchinson's Magazine, twenty of which were illustrated by Edmund Blampied. These "spook stories", as he called them, were reprinted in collections by his principal publisher Walter Hutchinson. His 1906 short story "The Bus-Conductor", a fatal-crash premonition tale about a person haunted by a hearse driver, has been adapted several times. (Note: The catchphrase from "The Bus-Conductor", "Room for one more", created a legend, and also occurs in the 1986 Oingo Boingo song "Dead Man's Party".)

Benson's story David Blaize and the Blue Door (1918) is a children's fantasy influenced by the work of Lewis Carroll. "Mr Tilly's Seance" is a witty and amusing story about a man flattened by a traction engine who finds himself dead and conscious on the 'other side'. Other notable stories are the eerie "The Room in the Tower" and "Pirates".

Benson is known for a series of biographies/autobiographies and memoirs, including one of Charlotte Brontë. His last book, delivered to his publisher ten days before his death, was an autobiography titled Final Edition.

== Links to Rye, East Sussex ==
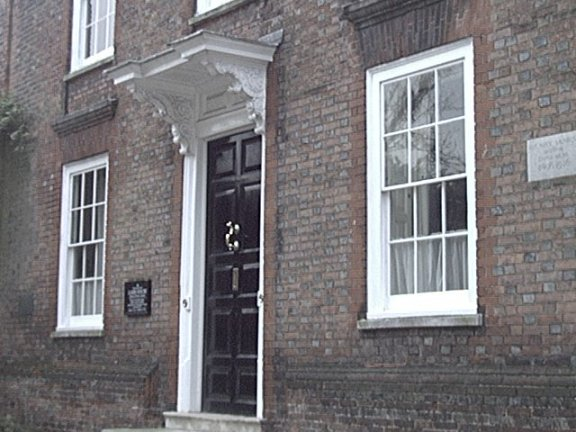
Lamb House, home of E. F. Benson and model for "Mallards" in the Lucia series

The principal setting of four of the Mapp and Lucia books is a town named Tilling, which is recognizably based on Rye, East Sussex, where Benson lived from 1918 and served as mayor from 1934. Benson's home, Lamb House, served as the model for Mallards, Mapp's – and ultimately Lucia's – home in some of the Tilling series. There really was a handsome "Garden Room" adjoining the street but it was destroyed by a bomb during the Second World War. Lamb House attracted writers: it was earlier the home of Henry James, and later of Rumer Godden.

He donated a church window of the main parish church in Rye, St Mary's, in memory of his brother, as well as providing a gift of a viewing platform overlooking the Town Salts. His dog, Taffy, is featured in the stained glass window. Taffy is buried in a corner of the garden at Lamb House.

Taffy and other dogs are buried in the garden at Lamb House, Rye.

== Personal life ==
Benson is now widely believed to have been homosexual, although there is no historical record or evidence that he ever had sexual relations with anyone. At Cambridge, he fell in love with several fellow students, including Vincent Yorke (father of the novelist Henry Green), about whom he confided to his diary, "I feel perfectly mad about him just now... Ah, if only he knew, and yet I think he does." In later life, Benson maintained friendships with a wide circle of homosexual men and shared a villa on the Italian island of Capri with John Ellingham Brooks; before the First World War, the island had been popular with wealthy homosexual men. It is unclear though if he engaged with homosexual contacts there, as he seems to have rejected casual contacts. He lived for some years with American artist George Wolfe Plank, who worked for Vogue magazine, at his home in Rye.

Homoeroticism and a general homosexual sensibility suffuse his literary works, such as David Blaize (1916), and his most popular works are famed for their wry and dry camp humour and social observations.

In London he lived at 395 Oxford Street, W1, now a branch of Russell & Bromley just west of Bond Street Underground Station, 102 Oakley Street, SW3, and 25 Brompton Square, SW3, where much of the action of Lucia in London and Secret Lives occurs and where English Heritage placed a Blue Plaque in 1994.

== Death ==
Benson died on 29 February 1940 of throat cancer at University College Hospital, London. He is buried in the cemetery at Rye, East Sussex.

== Bibliography ==
=== Novels ===
Dodo trilogy:

1. Dodo: A Detail of the Day (1893)
2. Dodo's Daughter (1913; published in the UK [1914] as Dodo the Second)
3. Dodo Wonders (1921)

David Blaize series:

1. David Blaize (1916)
2. David Blaize and the Blue Door (1918)
3. David of King's (1924; published in the United States as David Blaize of King's)

Mapp and Lucia series:

1. Queen Lucia (1920)
2. Miss Mapp (1922 [UK]; published in the United States 1923)
3. Lucia in London (1927 [UK]; published in the United States 1928)
4. Mapp and Lucia (1931)
5. Lucia's Progress (1935; published in the United States as The Worshipful Lucia)
6. Trouble for Lucia (1939)

Colin series:

1. Colin: A Novel (1923)
2. Colin II (1925)

Self-contained novels:

- The Rubicon (novel)|The Rubicon (1894)
- The Judgement Books (novella, 1895)
- Limitations (Benson novel) (1896)
- The Babe, B.A. (1897)
- The Money Market (1898)
- The Vintage (1898)
- The Capsina (1899)
- Mammon and Co. (1899)
- The Princess Sophia (1900)
- The Luck of the Vails (1901)
- Scarlet and Hyssop (1902)
- An Act in a Backwater (1903)
- The Book of Months (1903)
- The Relentless City (1903)
- The Valkyries (1903)
- The Challoners (1904)
- The Angel of Pain (1905 [USA]; published in the UK 1906)
- The Image in the Sand (1905)
- The House of Defence (1906)
- Paul (1906)
- Sheaves (1907)
- The Blotting Book (1908)
- The Climber (1908)
- A Reaping (1909) (A sequel to The Book of Months)
- Daisy's Aunt (1910; published in the United States [1910] as The Fascinating Mrs. Halton)
- Margery (1910; published in the UK [1911] as Juggernaut)
- The Osbornes (1910)
- Account Rendered (1911)
- Mrs. Ames (1912)
- Thorley Weir (1913)
- The Weaker Vessel (1913)
- Arundel (1914)
- The Oakleyites (1915)
- Mike (1916 [UK]; published in the United States as Michael)
- An Autumn Sowing (1917)
- Mr. Teddy (1917 [UK]; published in the United States as The Tortoise)
- Up and Down (1918)
- Across the Stream (1919)
- Robin Linnet (1919)
- Lovers and Friends (1921)
- Peter (1922)
- Alan (1924)
- Rex (1925)
- Mezzanine (1926)
- Pharisees and Publicans (1926)
- Paying Guests (1929)
- The Inheritor (1930)
- Secret Lives (1932)
- As We Are, A Modern Revue (1932)
- Travail of Gold (1933)
- Ravens' Brood (1934)

=== Short stories ===
- "Adjustments" (Munsey's Magazine April 1923)
- "The Alliance of Laughter" (Scribner's Magazine December 1902)
- "And No Bird Sings" (Woman December 1926)
- "And the Dead Spake—" (Hutchinson's Magazine October 1922)
- "The Ape" (The Story-teller May 1917)
- "At Abdul Ali's Grave" (The Graphic 24 June 1899, as "A Curious Coincidence")
- "At King's Cross Station" (Six Common Things, Osgood, McIlvaine & Co., 1893)
- "Atmospherics" (The Radio Times 28 December 1928)
- "At the Farmhouse" (Hutchinson's Magazine March 1923)
- "Aunts and Pianos" (The Windsor Magazine August 1926)
- "Autumn and Love" (Six Common Things, Osgood, McIlvaine & Co., 1893)
- "Bagnell Terrace" (Hutchinson's Magazine July 1925)
- "The Bath-Chair" (More Spook Stories by E. F. Benson, Hutchinson, 1934)
- "The Bed by the Window" (Hutchinson's Story-Magazine July 1929)
- "Between the Lights" (The Room in the Tower and Other Stories by E. F. Benson, Mills Boon, 1912)
- "Blue Stripe" (Six Common Things, Osgood, McIlvaine & Co., 1893)
- "The Box at the Bank" (Hutchinson's Magazine March 1928)
- "Boxing Night" (The Tatler 30 November 1923)
- "The Bread of Deceit" (Ainslee's Magazine October 1903)
- "A Breath of Scandal" (The Story-teller July 1932)
- "The Brick [Dodo]" (The Home Magazine (UK) March 1923)
- "Bully" (The Windsor Magazine November 1915)
- "Buntingford Jugs" (The Windsor Magazine December 1925)
- "The Bus Conductor" (The Pall Mall Magazine December 1906)
- "By the Sluice" (The Tatler 25 March 1927)
- "By the Waters of Sparta" (Temple Bar August 1903)
- "The Call" (The Radio Times 17 December 1926)
- "Carrington" (Six Common Things, Osgood, McIlvaine & Co., 1893)
- "The Case of Bertram Porter" (The Windsor Magazine March 1911)
- "The Case of Frank Hampden" (Pearson's Magazine December 1915, as "The Return of Frank Hampden")
- "The Cat" (The Illustrated London News 27 November 1905)
- "Caterpillars" (The Room in the Tower and Other Stories by E. F. Benson, Mills Boon, 1912)
- "The China Bowl" (Pearson's Magazine December 1916)
- "The Chippendale Mirror" (Pearson's Magazine May 1915)
- "Christmas with the Old Masters" (Hutchinson's Magazine December 1922)
- "Christopher Comes Back" (Hutchinson's Magazine May 1929)
- "The Clandon Crystal" (The Onlooker 23 November 1901)
- "A Comedy of Styles" (The Windsor Magazine February 1914)
- "Complementary Souls" (Cassell's Magazine September 1925)
- "The Confession of Charles Linkworth" (The Cavalier and the Scrap Book 13 January 1912)
- "The Corner House" (Woman May 1926)
- "Corstophine" (Hutchinson's Magazine September 1924)
- "The Countess of Lowndes Square" (The Pall Mall Magazine October 1910)
- "A Creed of Manners" (Phil May's Annual #4, Winter 1894)
- "The Dance" (More Spook Stories by E. F. Benson, Hutchinson, 1934)
- "The Dance on the Beefsteak" (Temple Bar September 1902)
- "Dark and Nameless" (Hutchinson's Magazine November 1924, as "The Temple")
- "The Death Warrant" (Six Common Things, Osgood, McIlvaine & Co., 1893)
- "The Defeat of Lady Grantham" (Six Common Things, Osgood, McIlvaine & Co., 1893)
- "Dewan-I-Khas" (The Century Magazine June 1914)
- "Dicky's Pain" (The Windsor Magazine April 1927)
- "The Disappearance of Jacob Conifer" (The Windsor Magazine October 1927)
- "Dives and Lazarus" (The New Statesman and Nation 12 August 1939)
- "Dr. Drage's Dilemma" (Nash's Magazine September 1909)
- "Dodo and the Maharajah [Dodo]" (Hearst's International June 1921)
- "Doggies" (The Windsor Magazine January 1928)
- "Donald Murray's Romance" (Lippincott's Monthly Magazine September 1899)
- "A Double Misfit" (Frank Leslie's Popular Monthly August 1902)
- "The Drawing-Room Bureau" (The Woman at Home December 1915)
- "Dummy on a Dahabeah" (Weekly Welcome 1 June 1896, as "Cherry Blossom")
- "The Dust-Cloud" (The Pall Mall Magazine January 1906)
- "Entomology" (The Windsor Magazine August 1925)
- "The Everlasting Silence" (The Lady's Realm January 1898)
- "Expiation" (Hutchinson's Magazine November 1923)
- "The Exposure of Pamela" (The Story-teller August 1924)
- "The Face" (Hutchinson's Magazine February 1924)
- "The False Step" (The Windsor Magazine December 1914)
- "Femme Dispose" (Lippincott's Magazine August 1900)
- "For His Friends" (Pearson's Magazine September 1904)
- "The Friend in the Garden" (The Story-teller August 1912)
- "The Gardener" (Hutchinson's Magazine August 1922)
- "The Garden Gate" (The Queen 6 January 1912)
- "Gare du Nord" (The Smart Set September 1906)
- "Gavon's Eve" (The Illustrated London News 13 January 1906)
- "Guy's Candidate" (The Pall Mall Magazine January 1909)
- "The Hanging of Alfred Wadham" (Britannia 21 December 1928)
- "The Hapless Bachelors" (Pearson's Magazine March 1921)
- "The Harmonious Blacksmith" (The Windsor Magazine December 1912)
- "Highness" (Harper's Bazar November 1920)
- "Home Sweet Home" (Woman June 1927)
- "The Horror-Horn" (Hutchinson's Magazine September 1922)
- "Household Books" (The Story-teller January 1936)
- "The House with the Brick-Kiln" (The London Magazine December 1908)
- "How Fear Departed from the Long Gallery" (The Windsor Magazine December 1911)
- "Inscrutable Decrees" (Hutchinson's Magazine April 1923)
- "In the Dark" (The Windsor Magazine January 1915)
- "In the Tube" (Hutchinson's Magazine December 1922)
- "Jack and Poll" (Six Common Things, Osgood, McIlvaine & Co., 1893)
- "James Lamp" (Weird Tales June 1930)
- "Julian's Cottage" (The Story-teller August 1931)
- "The Lesson" (Cassell's Magazine December 1909)
- "The Letters of Anthony Noble" (The Story-teller April 1934)
- "The Light in the Garden" (Eve 23 November 1921)
- "The Limoges Manuscript" (The Lady's Realm January 1909)
- "Love's Apostate" (The Pall Mall Magazine November 1894)
- "Machaon" (Hutchinson's Magazine January 1923)
- "Middleman" (Lippincott's Magazine June 1913)
- "Miss Maria's Romance" (The Queen 25 November 1899)
- "Mr. Tilly's Séance" (Munsey's Magazine December 1922)
- "M.O.M." (The Windsor Magazine December 1913)
- "Monkeys" (Weird Tales December 1933)
- "Mrs. Amworth" (Hutchinson's Magazine June 1922)
- "Mrs. Andrews's Control" (The Windsor Magazine September 1915)
- "Mrs. Naseby's Denial" (Longman's Magazine January 1894)
- "Music" (The Windsor Magazine December 1924)
- "My Friend the Murderer" (Chapman's Magazine October 1895)
- "Naboth's Vineyard" (Hutchinson’s Magazine December 1923)
- "Negotium Perambulans" (Hutchinson's Magazine November 1922, as "Visible and Invisible")
- "Noblesse Oblige" (The Windsor Magazine December 1917)
- "Number 12" (Eve 10 May 1922)
- "The Old Bligh" (Ainslee's February 1909)
- "The Osborne Year" (Nash's Magazine July 1909)
- "The Other Bed" (The Popular Magazine April 1908)
- "Outside the Door" (The London Magazine January 1910)
- "The Overture to 'Tannhauser'" (The English Illustrated Magazine December 1893)
- "A Pair of Chelsea Figures" (Lloyd's Story Magazine July 1921)
- "The Passenger" (Pearson's Magazine March 1917)
- "The Peerage Cure" (The Windsor Magazine July 1926)
- "Philip's Safety Razor" (Pearson's Magazine March 1919)
- "Pirates" (Hutchinson's Magazine October 1928)
- "Poor Miss Huntingford" (Six Common Things, Osgood, McIlvaine & Co., 1893)
- "Professor Burnaby's Discovery" (The Story-teller June 1926)
- "The Progress of Princess Waldeneck [Dodo]" (The Lady's Realm May 1897)
- "The Psychical Mallards" (Pears' Annual Christmas 1921)
- "The Puce Silk" (The Lady's Realm November 1907)
- "Puss-Cat" (The Pall Mall Magazine August 1911)
- "The Queen of the Spa" (The Windsor Magazine September 1926)
- "Queen's Pawn Gambit" (The Story-teller February 1936)
- "Reconciliation" (Hutchinson's Magazine July 1924)
- "The Red House" (Pearson's Magazine December 1914)
- "The Renewal" (The Cosmopolitan November 1894)
- "The Return of Dodo [Dodo]" (The Lady's Realm December 1896)
- "The Return of Sherlock Holmes [Sherlock Holmes]" (with Eustace H. Miles, The Mad Annual by E. F. Benson & Eustace H. Miles, Richards, 1903)
- "The Return of the Probationer" (The English Illustrated Magazine July 1894)
- "Revolt in the Temple" (The Story-teller June 1931)
- "Roderick's Story" (Hutchinson's Magazine May 1923)
- "The Room in the Tower" (The Pall Mall Magazine January 1912)
- "The Satyr's Sandals" (Pan #20, 20 March 1920)
- "The Sea-Green Incorruptible" (The Century Magazine November 1916)
- "Sea Mist" (The Illustrated London News 20 November 1935)
- "The Shootings of Achnaleish" (The Illustrated London News 27 Oct, 3 Nov 1906)
- "The Shuttered Room"(Hutchinson's Story-Magazine August 1929)
- "The Simple Life" (The World & His Wife July 1906)
- "Smorfia" (The Windsor Magazine July 1915)
- "The Snow-Stone" (The London Magazine May 1905)
- "The Sound of the Grinding" (Six Common Things, Osgood, McIlvaine & Co., 1893)
- "Spinach" (Hutchinson's Magazine May 1924)
- "Starfish and Sea Lavender [Dodo]" (Hearst's Magazine January 1921)
- "The Story of a Mazurka" (The English Illustrated Magazine November 1893)
- "The Superannuation Department, A.D. 1945" (The Windsor Magazine January 1906)
- "A Superfluous Loyalist" (The Pall Mall Magazine October 1902)
- "The Tale of an Empty House" (Hutchinson's Magazine June 1925)
- "The Terror by Night" (The Room in the Tower and Other Stories by E. F. Benson, Mills Boon, 1912)
- "The Three Old Ladies" (Six Common Things, Osgood, McIlvaine & Co., 1893)
- "Through" (The Century Magazine July 1917)
- "Thursday Evenings" "Pears' Annual 1920"
- "To Account Rendered" (The Story-teller June 1925)
- "The Top Landing" (Eve 7 June 1922)
- "The Tragedy of a Green Totem" (Six Common Things, Osgood, McIlvaine & Co., 1893)
- "The Tragedy of Oliver Bowman" (Pearson's Magazine December 1918)
- "Two Days After" (Six Common Things, Osgood, McIlvaine & Co., 1893)
- "What Came Into the Long Gallery" (New Story Magazine March 1915)
- "A Winter Morning" (Six Common Things, Osgood, McIlvaine & Co., 1893)
- "The Wishing-Well" (Hutchinson's Magazine February 1929)
- "The Witch-Ball" (Woman's Journal December 1928)
- "The Woman in the Veil" (The (London) Evening News 26 June 1928)
- "A Woman's Ambition" (The Windsor Magazine December 1900)
- "Young Marling" (The Strand Magazine November 1920)
- "The Zoo" (Six Common Things, Osgood, McIlvaine & Co., 1893)

=== Collections and uncollected short stories ===
Collections:

- Six Common Things (1893 [UK]; published in the United States as A Double Overture 1894), collection of 16 short stories:
  "Once", "Autumn and Love", "Two Days After", "Carrington", "Jack and Poll", "At King's Cross Station", "The Sound of the Grinding", "Blue Stripe", "A Winter Morning", "The Zoo", "The Three Old Ladies", "Like a Grammarian", "Poor Miss Huntingford", "The Defeat of Lady Grantham.", "The Tragedy of a Green Totem", "The Death Warrant"
- The Room in the Tower, and Other Stories (1912), collection of 16 short stories and 1 novelette:
  "The Room in the Tower", "The Dust-Cloud", "Gavon's Eve", "The Confession of Charles Linkworth", "At Abdul Ali's Grave", "The Shootings of Achnaleish", "How Fear Departed from the Long Gallery", "Caterpillars", "The Cat", "The Bus-Conductor", "The Man Who Went Too Far" (novelette), "Between the Lights", "Outside the Door", "The Terror by Night", "The Other Bed", "The Thing in the Hall", "The House with the Brick-Kiln"
- The Countess of Lowndes Square, and Other Stories (1920), collection of 14 short stories:
  "The Countess of Lowndes Square", "The Blackmailer of Park Lane", "The Dance on the Beefsteak", "The Oriolists", "In the Dark", "The False Step", "The Case of Frank Hampden", "Mrs. Andrews's Control", "The Ape", "Through", "'Puss-Cat'", "There Arose a King", "Tragedy of Oliver Bowman", "Philip's Safety Razor"
- "And the Dead Spake—", and The Horror Horn (1923), collection of 2 short stories:
  "The Horror-Horn", "'And the Dead Spake...'"
- Visible and Invisible (1923 [UK]; published in the United States 1924), collection of 12 short stories:
  "'And the Dead Spake...'", "The Outcast", "The Horror-Horn", "Machaon", "Negotium Perambulans", "At the Farmhouse", "Inscrutable Decrees", "The Gardener", "Mr. Tilly's Séance", "Mrs. Amworth", "In the Tube", "Roderick's Story"
- Spook Stories (1928), collection of 12 short stories:
  "Reconciliation", "The Face", "Spinach", "Bagnell Terrace", "A Tale of an Empty House", "Naboth's Vineyard", "Expiation", "Home, Sweet Home", "'And No Bird Sings'", "The Corner House", "Corstophine", "The Temple"
- More Spook Stories (1934), collection of 13 short stories:
  "The Step", "The Bed by the Window", "James Lamp", "The Dance", "The Hanging of Alfred Wadham", "Pirates", "The Wishing-Well", "The Bath-Chair", "Monkeys", "Christopher Comes Back", "The Sanctuary", "Thursday Evenings", "The Psychical Mallards"
- Old London (1937), collection of 4 novellas:
  "Portrait of an English Nobleman", "Janet", "Friend of the Rich", "The Unwanted"
- The Horror Horn and Other Stories: The Best Horror Stories of E. F. Benson (1974), collection of 13 short stories:
  "The Sanctuary", "Monkeys", "The Bed by the Window", "'And No Bird Sings'", "The Face", "Mrs. Amworth", "Negotium Perambulans", "The Horror-Horn", "The House with the Brick-Kiln", "The Thing in the Hall", "Caterpillars", "Gavon's Eve", "The Room in the Tower"
- The Tale of an Empty House and Other Ghost Stories (1986), collection of 14 short stories:
  "The Face", "Caterpillars", "Expiation", "The Tale of an Empty House", "The Bus-Conductor", "How Fear Departed from the Long Gallery", "The Other Bed", "The Room in the Tower", "Mrs. Amworth", "'And No Bird Sings'", "Mr. Tilly's Séance", "Home, Sweet Home", "The Sanctuary", "Pirates"
- The Flint Knife (Equation, 1988), edited by Jack Adrian, collection of 15 short stories (12 previously uncollected and 3 previously collected in The Countess of Lowndes Square):
  "The Flint Knife", "The Chippendale Mirror", "The Witch-Ball", "The Ape", "Sir Roger de Coverley", "The China Bowl", "The Passenger", "The Friend in the Garden", "The Red House", "Through", "The Box at the Bank", "The Light in the Garden", "Dummy on a Dahabeah", "The Return of Frank Hampden", "The Shuttered Room"
- Desirable Residences and Other Stories (1991), edited by Jack Adrian, collection of 6 short stories:
  "The Superannuation Department AD 1945", "The Satyr's Sandals", "The Disappearance of Jacob Conifer", "Number 12", "The Top Landing", "Sea Mist"
- The Collected Ghost Stories of E. F. Benson (Carroll & Graf, 1992), edited by Richard Dalby, omnibus ed of collections The Room in the Tower, and Other Stories, Visible and Invisible, Spook Stories and More Spook Stories, with the addition of an essay on "The Clonmel Witch Burning", about the murder of Bridget Cleary; Despite its title, the collection does not include any of the stories collected in The Flint Knife.
- Fine Feathers and Other Stories (Oxford University Press, 1994), edited by Jack Adrian, collection of 31 short stories:
  The three Spook stories printed here do not appear in The Flint Knife or The Collected Ghost Stories:
  - The Further Diversions of Amy Bondham: "The Lovers", "Complete Rest", "The Five Foolish Virgins"
  - Crook stories: "My Friend the Murderer", "Professor Burnaby's Discovery"
  - Sardonic stories: "The Exposure of Pamela", "Miss Maria's Romance", "The Eavesdropper", "James Sutherland, Ltd", "Bootles", "Julian's Cottage"
  - Society stories: "Fine Feathers", "The Defeat of Lady Hartridge", "The Jamboree", "Complementary Souls", "Dodo and the Brick", "A Comedy of Styles", "Noblesse Oblige", "An Entire Mistake", "Mr Carew's Game of Croquet", "The Fall of Augusta", "The Male Impersonator"
  - Crank stories: "M. O. M.", "The Adventure of Hegel Junior", "The Simple Life", "Mrs Andrews's Control", "George's Secret", "Buntingford Jugs"
  - Spook stories: "By the sluice", "Atmospherics", "Boxing Night"
- The Collected Spook Stories series (Ash-Tree Press), collects all of E. F. Benson's supernatural fiction.
  1. Vol. 1: The Terror by Night (1998), collection of 14 short stories and 1 novelette:
    "At Abdul Ali's Grave", "The Man Who Went Too Far" (novelette), "The Cat", "The Dust-Cloud", "Gavon's Eve", "The Shootings of Achnaleish", "The Bus-Conductor", "The Terror by Night", "The House with the Brick-Kiln", "Between the Lights", "Caterpillars", "Outside the Door", "The Thing in the Hall", "The Other Bed", "How Fear Departed from the Long Gallery"
  2. Vol. 2: The Passenger (1999), collection of 14 short stories:
    "The Room in the Tower", "The Confession of Charles Linkworth", "The Friend in the Garden", "Dummy on a Dahabeah", "The Red House", "The Chippendale Mirror", "The Return of Frank Hampden", "The China Bowl", "The Passenger", "The Ape", "Through", "Thursday Evenings", "The Light in the Garden", "The Psychical Mallards"
  3. Vol. 3: Mrs Amworth (2001), collection of 16 short stories:
    "The Outcast", "Number 12", "Mrs. Amworth", "The Top Landing", "The Gardener", "The Horror-Horn", "'And the Dead Spake...'", "Negotium Perambulans...", "In the Tube", "Machaon", "Mr. Tilly's Séance", "At the Farmhouse", "Inscrutable Decrees", "Roderick's Story", "Expiation", "Boxing Night"
  4. Vol. 4: The Face (2003), collection of 15 short stories:
    "Naboth's Vineyard", "The Face", "Spinach", "Reconciliation", "Corstophine", "The Temple", "A Tale of an Empty House", "Bagnell Terrace", "The Corner House", "'And No Bird Sings'", "The Call", "The Bath-Chair", "The Dance", "Home, Sweet Home", "By the Sluice"
  5. Vol. 5: Sea Mist (2005), collection of 20 short stories:
    "Dives and Lazarus", "Sir Roger de Coverley", "The Box at the Bank", "Pirates", "The Witch-Ball", "The Hanging of Alfred Wadham", "Atmospherics", "The Wishing-Well", "Christopher Comes Back", "The Bed by the Window", "The Shuttered Room", "The Flint Knife", "James Lamp", "The Step", "The Sanctuary", "Monkeys", "Sea Mist", "Mrs. Andrews's Control", "The Clandon Crystal", "The Everlasting Silence"
- Night Terrors: The Ghost Stories of E. F. Benson (Wordsworth, 2012), edited by David Stuart Davies; Effectively a reprint of Richard Dalby's 1992 Collected Ghost Stories of E. F. Benson, since it is an omnibus ed of The Room in the Tower, and Other Stories, Visible and Invisible, Spook Stories and More Spook Stories; It omits the essay on "The Clonmel Witch Burning" and substitutes an introduction by Davies for that by Dalby.
- The E. F. Benson Megapack (2013), collection of 35 short stories and 1 novelette:
  "At Abdul Ali's Grave", "The Man Who Went Too Far" (novelette), "The Cat", "Gavon's Eve", "The Dust-Cloud", "The Shootings at Achnaleish", "The Bus-Conductor", "The House with the Brick-Kiln", "Outside the Door", "How Fear Departed from the Long Gallery", "The Confession of Charles Linkworth", "The Room in the Tower", "Caterpillars", "Between the Lights", "The Terror by Night", "The Other Bed", "The China Bowl", "The Passenger", "The Ape", "Through", "Thursday Evenings", "The Psychical Mallards", "Mrs Amworth", "The Gardener", "The Horror-Horn", "'And the Dead Spake...'", "Negotium Perambulans", "In the Tube", "Mr. Tilly's Séance", "The Case of Frank Hampden", "Mrs. Andrews's Control", "The Death Warrant", "Machaon", "At the Farmhouse", "Inscrutable Decrees", "The Thing in the Hall"
- Ghost Stories (2016), collection of 8 short stories and 1 novelette:
  "Spinach", "In the Tube", "The Man Who Went Too Far" (novelette), "Mrs Amworth", "The Room in the Tower", "The Bus-Conductor", "Negotium Perambulans", "'And No Bird Sings'", "Caterpillars"
- The Outcast and Other Dark Tales (2020), collection of 16 short stories:
  "Dummy on a Dahabeah", "A Winter Morning", "The Thing in the Hall", "The Passenger", "The Light in the Garden", "The Outcast", "The Top Landing", "The Face", "The Corner House", "By the Sluice", "Pirates", "The Secret Garden", "The Flint Knife", "The Bath-Chair", "The Dance", "Billy Comes Through"

Uncollected short stories:

- "The Mystery of Black Rock Creek" (1894), with Jerome K. Jerome, Frank Frankfort Moore, Barry Pain and Eden Phillpotts
- "The Adventure of Hegel", Illustrated London News, January 1901
- "The Hapless Bachelors" (1921)
- "The Witch Ball", Woman's Journal, December 1928
- "The Woman in the Veil" (1928)
- "Dark and Nameless" (1929)

=== Collection of sketches ===
- The Freaks of Mayfair (1916)

=== Unpublished plays ===
- Aunt Jeannie (1902)
- Dodo (1905)
- The Friend in the Garden (1906)
- Dinner for Eight (1915)
- The Luck of the Vails (1928)

=== Non-fiction ===
Articles (selected)

- "'A Question of Taste,'", The Nineteenth Century, Volume 34, July/December 1893
- "The Recent 'Witch Burning' at Clonmel", or "The Clonmel Witch Burning" (1895)
- "A House of Help", Londonderry Sentinel, 11 November 1924
- "The Way Out", Falkirk Herald, 7 May 1927. Reprinted: Mansfield Reporter, 3 June 1927; Gazette, 6 July 1927
- "The Athletic Ideal", Buckingham Advertiser & Free Press, 25 August 1928. Reprinted: Worthing Gazette, 29 August 1928; Littlehampton Gazette, 31 August 1928
- "The Grave-Diggers", Todmorden & District News, 10 January 1930
- Sheridan LeFanu, 1931, republished in Reflections in a Glass Darkly: Essays on J. Sheridan LeFanu, 2011
- "Men and Bees", Middlesex County Times, 26 March 1932. Reprinted: Long Eaton Advertiser, 1 April 1932
- "Our Hard-working Royal Family", Yorkshire Evening Post, 29 November 1934
- The King and His Reign, a series of twelve articles published in The Spectator between 22 February and 9 May 1935, to commemorate the silver jubilee of King George V

Autobiographies

- Our Family Affairs, 1867–1896 (1920 [UK]; published in the United States 1921)
- Mother (1925)
- Final Edition: Informal Autobiography (1940)

Biographies

- Sir Francis Drake (1927)
- The Life of Alcibiades (1928)
- As We Were: A Victorian Peepshow, or As We Are (1930)
- Ferdinand Magellan (1929 [UK]; published in the United States 1930)
- Charlotte Brontë (1932)
- King Edward VII (1933)
- Queen Victoria (1935)
- Charlotte, Anne and Emily Brontë (1936; essay)
- Queen Victoria's Daughters (1938 [USA]; published in the UK [1939] as The Daughters of Queen Victoria)

Guides

- Daily Training (1902), with Eustace Miles
- Diversions Day by Day (1905), with Eustace Miles

History

- Deutschland Über Allah (1918; republished in Crescent and Iron Cross George H. Doran Company, 1918)
- Poland and Mittel-Europa (1918 [UK]; published in the United States 1919; reprinted as The White Eagle of Poland)
- The Outbreak of War, 1914 (1933 [UK]; published in the United States 1934)
- The Kaiser and English Relations (1936)

Opinion

- Thoughts from E. F. Benson [compiled by E. E. Norton] (1913)
- Thoughts from E. F. Benson [compiled by H. B. Elliott] (1917)

Pamphlets

- Notes on Excavations in Alexandrian Cemeteries [in collaboration with D. G. Hogarth] (1895)
- Two Generations (1904; published by the London Daily Mail), 10-page pamphlet
- From Abraham to Christ (1928)

Society

- The Social Value of Temperance (1919)

Sports

- A Book of Golf (1903), edited with Eustace Miles
- The Cricket of Abel, Hirst and Shrewsbury (1903), edited with Eustace Miles
- English Figure Skating (1908)
- Winter Sports in Switzerland (1913)

Others

- Sketches from Marlborough (1888)
- The Mad Annual (1903), with Eustace Miles
- Bensoniana (1912)

== Adaptations ==
- "The Hearse Driver", segment directed by Basil Dearden in film Dead of Night (1945), based on short story "The Bus-Conductor"
- "Mrs. Amworth", segment directed by Alvin Rakoff in film Three Dangerous Ladies (1977), based on short story "Mrs. Amworth"
- Trouble for Lucia, a 12-part adaptation by Aubrey Woods of the first four novels, broadcast in February 1983 on BBC Radio 4
- Mapp & Lucia (1985–1986), series directed by Donald McWhinnie, based on novels Mapp and Lucia, Lucia's Progress and Trouble for Lucia. Dramatised by Gerald Savory for a 10-episode TV series produced by London Weekend Television and broadcast in two five-part runs between 1985 and 1986 on the then recently launched Channel 4. The series featured Geraldine McEwan as Lucia, Prunella Scales as Mapp and Nigel Hawthorne as Georgie
- Mapp and Lucia, a 10-part adaptation by Ned Sherrin, broadcast in April and May 2007 on BBC Radio 4
- Lucia's Progress – a five-part dramatisation by John Peacock of the fifth novel, broadcast in 2008 on BBC Radio 4
- Mapp & Lucia (2014), miniseries directed by Diarmuid Lawrence, based on novel Mapp and Lucia, with incidents lifted from earlier novels. A three-part dramatisation by Steve Pemberton – starring Miranda Richardson as Mapp, Anna Chancellor as Lucia and Steve Pemberton as Georgie – broadcast on BBC One over consecutive evenings between 29 and 31 December 2014.

== Sequels ==
Further "Mapp and Lucia" books have been written by Tom Holt, Guy Fraser-Sampson, and Ian Shepherd.

== See also ==
- List of horror fiction authors
