= Mark Shelley =

American television producer

Mark Shelley was the Senior Series Producer for National Geographic Television & Film. He is also the founder and the Executive Director of Sea Studios Foundation, a non-profit team of film-makers, environmentalists and scientists who create films that raise public awareness of major issues facing the planet.

== Biography ==
Mark received his B.S. from Stanford University with honors in Biology, and conducted research at Woods Hole Oceanographic Institution for two years.

Over the years, he has created exhibit and television programs for aquariums, zoos, and natural history visitor centers around the world, working for National Geographic Television & Film, Turner Broadcasting (National Audubon) and the PBS Nature series. He specializes in underwater filmmaking and has developed deep sea imaging system, and is an expert diver and U.S. Navy certified submersible co-pilot.

His award-winning works are: "Jellies and Other Ocean Drifters", "Sea Nasties", "Desperately Seeking Sanctuary", "Aunt Merriwether's Adventures in the Backyard", "A World Alive", "Wild California, Wild California", "Explore Missouri Streams!" and "Live from Monterey Canyon".

Mark founded the Sea Studios Foundation in order to leverage the power of film and bring public awareness on major issues affecting our planet's health. In partnership with National Geographic Society, the Sea Studios Foundation has created a film series that brings focus on the Earth and its biodiversity, as well on the oceans. In collaboration with PBS, he worked on the films projects Strange Days, The Shape of Life, and Oceans in a Glass.
