= David Spencer (playwright) =

British playwright (born 1958)

David Spencer (born 1958) is a British playwright. He was born in Halifax, England to Irish parents. He moved to Berlin in 1989 where he has lived ever since. He teaches at the Universität der Künste in Berlin. He was a Fellow at the University of Huddersfield between 2009 and 2011.

Spencer has won the Verity Bargate Award twice, for his plays Releevo and Killing the Cat.

In 2019, his play 'Buried', based on his father's experiences in World War II, was performed at the Tristan Bates Theatre (now Seven Dials Playhouse), in a production by experimental theatre collective Bag of Beard. Spencer's nephew played 'Max', the character representing Spencer's father. This production transferred to the Old Red Lion Theatre in a triple bill with Simon Stephen's 'Nuclear War' and Max Saunders-Singer's 'Graceland'.
