= Glenlee =

Glenlee may refer to:

== Places ==
=== Australia ===
- Glenlee, New South Wales
  - Glenlee, Menangle Park, a heritage-listed property in the south-western Sydney suburb of Campbelltown, New South Wales
- Glenlee, Queensland, a locality in the Shire of Livingstone
- Glenlee, Victoria, in Shire of Hindmarsh, Australia

=== United Kingdom ===
- Glenlee, Dumfries and Galloway, Scotland, featured in Gossip from the Forest
- Glenlee hydro-electric power station, a part of the Galloway hydro-electric power scheme

== People ==
- Thomas Miller, Lord Glenlee

== Other ==
- Glenlee (ship), museum ship in Glasgow, Scotland
