= Big Fish Eat Little Fish =

Drawing by Pieter Bruegel the Elder

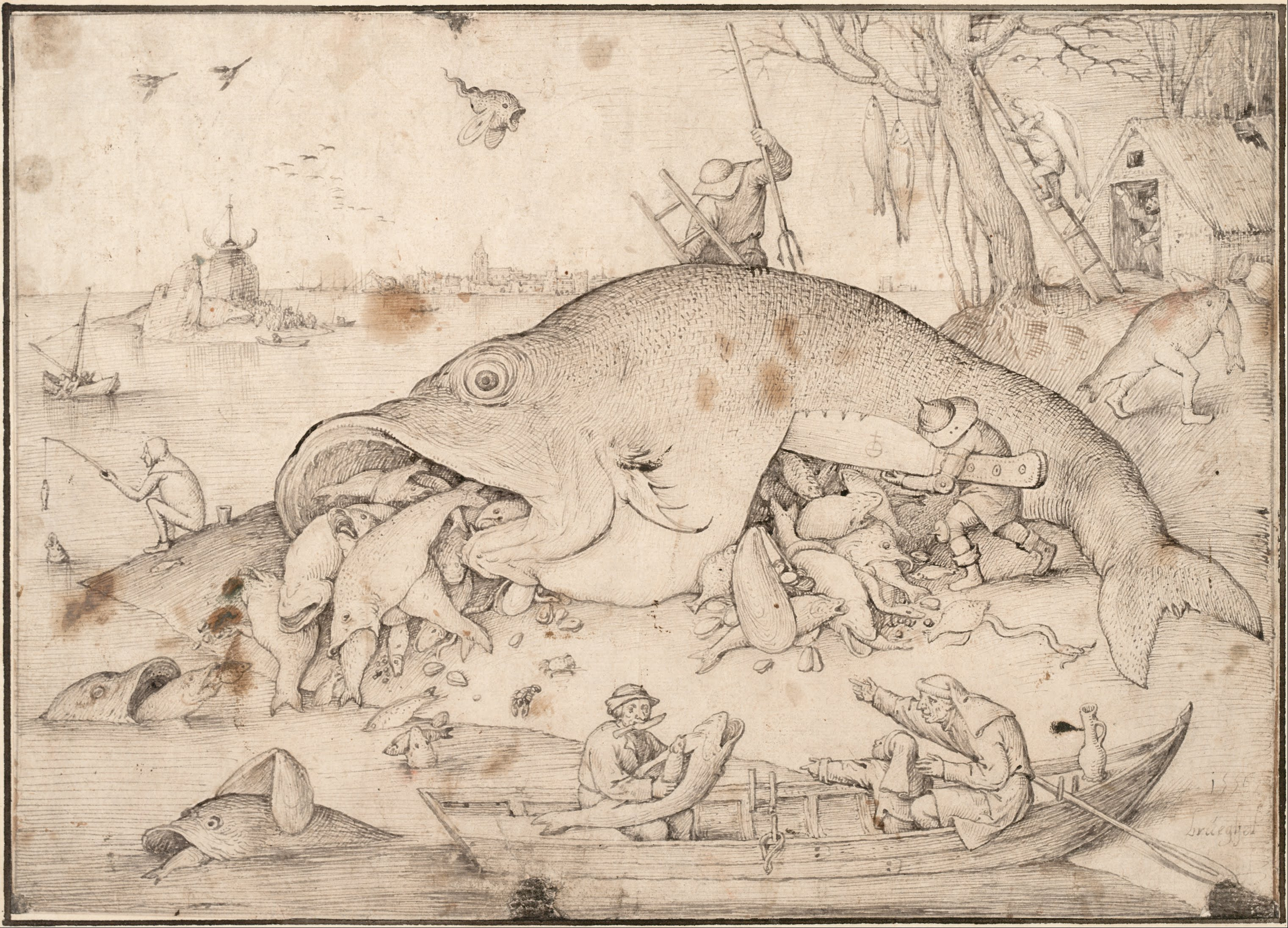
- Artist: Drawing by Pieter Bruegel the Elder; Engraving by Pieter van der Heyden
- Year: 1556 (engraved in 1557)
- Medium: Brush and pen drawing; gray and black ink; Engraving
- Subject: Fishes
- Dimensions: 21.6 cm × 30.7 cm (8.5 in × 12.1 in)
- Location: Albertina, Vienna, Austria
- Owner: Albertina
- Accession: inv.no.7875
- Website: sammlungenonline.albertina.at

Big Fish Eat Little Fish (aka The Big Fish Eat the Little Fish) originated as a 1556 drawing by the Flemish artist Pieter Bruegel the Elder (c.1525–1530 to 1569). It was made into an engraving by Pieter van der Heyden in 1557. An anonymous satirical engraving on the fall of Johan van Oldenbarnevelt was created in 1619. The name derives from a Flemish proverb.

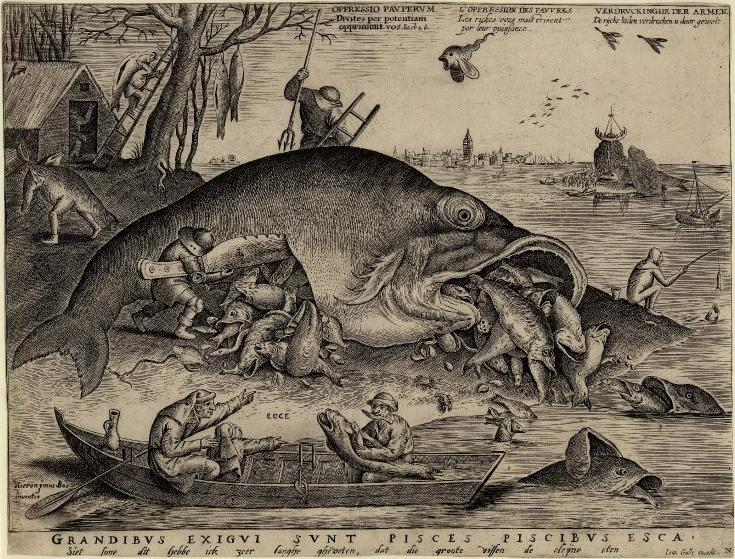
Engraving by Pieter van der Heyden

== History and description ==
The original 1556 Pieter Bruegel the Elder drawing is held by the Albertina art museum in Vienna, Austria, produced using gray and black ink on paper. It was engraved by Pieter van der Heyden and published by Hieronymus Cock in 1557. The engraving was signed with the name of the artist Hieronymus Bosch, who had died in 1516, most likely for commercial purposes, since Bosch was more well-known than Bruegel.

The picture shows a huge fish on the shore, having eaten many smaller fish, some of whom have yet smaller fish in their mouths. A person is cutting the fish open with a very large knife, revealing the contents of its stomach. Other fish are shown in the water, also with fish in their mouths. In the foreground is a boat with fishermen and another large fish, including a smaller fish cut from its stomach.

Copies of the engraving are held in international collections including the British Museum (London), the Metropolitan Museum (New York), the Art Institute of Chicago, and the Philadelphia Museum of Art.

== 2001 painting ==
A 2001 acrylic-on-canvas painting by the British artist Chris Gollon (1953–2017), after Breugel, is held in the collection of the River & Rowing Museum, purchased with the assistance of the Resource/Victoria and Albert Museum Purchase Grant Fund.

In 2012, the American artist Molly Crabapple created a political artwork entitled "Big Fish Eat Little Fish Eat Big Fish".

== See also ==
- Netherlandish Proverbs, 1559
