= Sara Maitland =

British writer

- Born: Sarah Louise Maitland; 27 February 1950 (age 76); London, United Kingdom
- Occupations: Writer of short stories, novelist, amateur theologian
- Writing career
- Period: 1978–present
- Genres: Nonfiction, fiction, theology, gardening
- Subjects: Christianity, saints, lives of women, mythology, fairy tales
- Notable works: Daughter of Jerusalem, "True North"/"Far North" (short story), A Big Enough God, A Book of Silence
- Notable awards: Somerset Maugham Award (1979) – Daughter of Jerusalem; Bristol Festival of Ideas Book Prize (nomination, 2009) – A Book of Silence; BBC National Short Story Award (runner up, 2009) – "Moss Witch"
- Website: saramaitland.com

Sara Maitland (born 27 February 1950) is a British writer of religious fantasy. A novelist, she is also known for her short stories. Her work has a magic realist tendency.

== Life and career ==
Sarah (later "Sara") Louise Maitland was born in London as the second of six children of Adam Maitland of Cumstoun House, Kirkcudbright, (a descendant of the judge Thomas Maitland, Lord Dundrennan) and Hope Baillie Maitland (née Fraser-Campbell). Adam Maitland's mother, Cecil Louise, was from the Scottish family of Mackenzie of Portmore descending from Colin Mackenzie of Portmore, friend of Walter Scott. Maitland has described her upper-class London family as "very open and noisy". In her childhood she went to school in a small Wiltshire town and attended St Mary's, a girls' boarding school in Calne, from the age of 12 until her admission to university. Maitland thought this school a terrible place and became very excitable.

Growing up, Maitland developed a wild reputation: in 1966 she scandalised one of her brothers by winning a foot race in a very short cotton dress. On entering Oxford University in 1968 to study English, she became friends with future US President Bill Clinton and a regular visitor at 46 Leckford Road, a house Clinton shared with Frank Aller, David Satter and Strobe Talbott. She suffered from problems of mental disarray and inability to carry out routine tasks. During her university years, Maitland was taken to a mental hospital on several occasions for this reason, but she completed her course and started writing.

She has been absorbed in religion since 1972. From 1972 to 1993 she was married to an Anglican priest, but divorced in 1993 and became a Roman Catholic. In 1995, she worked with Stanley Kubrick on the film A.I. Artificial Intelligence.

She has two adult children. Since her son left college, Maitland has moved towards a solitary and prayerful life in a variety of locations, first of all on the Isle of Skye and ultimately in her present house in Galloway. She says that she wants to avoid most of the comforts of life, especially those that intrude into her quest for silence such as mobile phones, radio, television and even her son. She has described these changes in her life and the experiences leading to them in the autobiographical A Book of Silence. Maitland has taught part-time for Lancaster University's MA in Creative Writing and is a Fellow of St Chad's College, Durham University.

Maitland's 2003 collection of short stories, On Becoming a Fairy Godmother, is a fictional celebration of the menopausal woman, while the title story of 2008's Far North was originally published as "True North" in her first collection Telling Tales and was made into a film of the same title in 2007. The rest of Far North collects dark mythological tales from around the world.

== Bibliography ==
=== Novels ===
- Daughter of Jerusalem, 1978 (winner of Somerset Maugham Award 1979)
  - also published as The Languages of Love
- Virgin Territory, 1984
- Arky Types, 1987 (with Michelene Wandor)
- Three Times Table, 1991
- Home Truths, 1993
  - published as Ancestral Truths in the United States
- Hagiographies, 1998
- Brittle Joys, 1999

=== Short story collections ===
- Telling Tales, 1983
- A Book of Spells, 1987
- Women Fly When Men Aren't Watching, 1992
- Angel and Me (for Holy Week), 1996
- On Becoming A Fairy Godmother, Maia, 2003
- Far North & Other Dark Tales, 2008
- Moss Witch, 2013

=== Non-fiction ===
- A Map of the New Country: Women and Christianity, 1983
- Vesta Tilley, Virago, 1986
- A Big-Enough God: Artful Theology, Mowbray, 1994
- Virtuous Magic: Women Saints and Their Meanings (with Wendy Mulford), 1998
- Novel Thoughts: Religious Fiction in Contemporary Culture, Erasmus Institute, 1999
- Awesome God: Creation, Commitment and Joy, SPCK, 2002
- The Write Guide (with Martin Goodman), New Writing North, 2007
- Stations of the Cross (with Chris Gollon), 2009
- A Book of Silence, Granta, 2008 (hardcover); 2009 (paperback)
- Gossip from the Forest: the Tangled Roots of our Forests and Fairytales (ISBN 9781847084293), Granta, 2012
- How to Be Alone, in The School of Life series (ISBN 9780230768086), Picador, 2014

=== As editor ===
- Very Heaven: Looking Back at the 1960s, 1988
- The Rushdie File, 1990 (with Lisa Appignanesi)

== Notes ==
- Sage, Lorna, ed. (1999). "Sara Maitland". The Cambridge Guide to Women's Writing in English. Cambridge: Cambridge University Press. p. 414. ISBN 9780521668132. "maitland."
