= Frans Boels =

Flemish painter

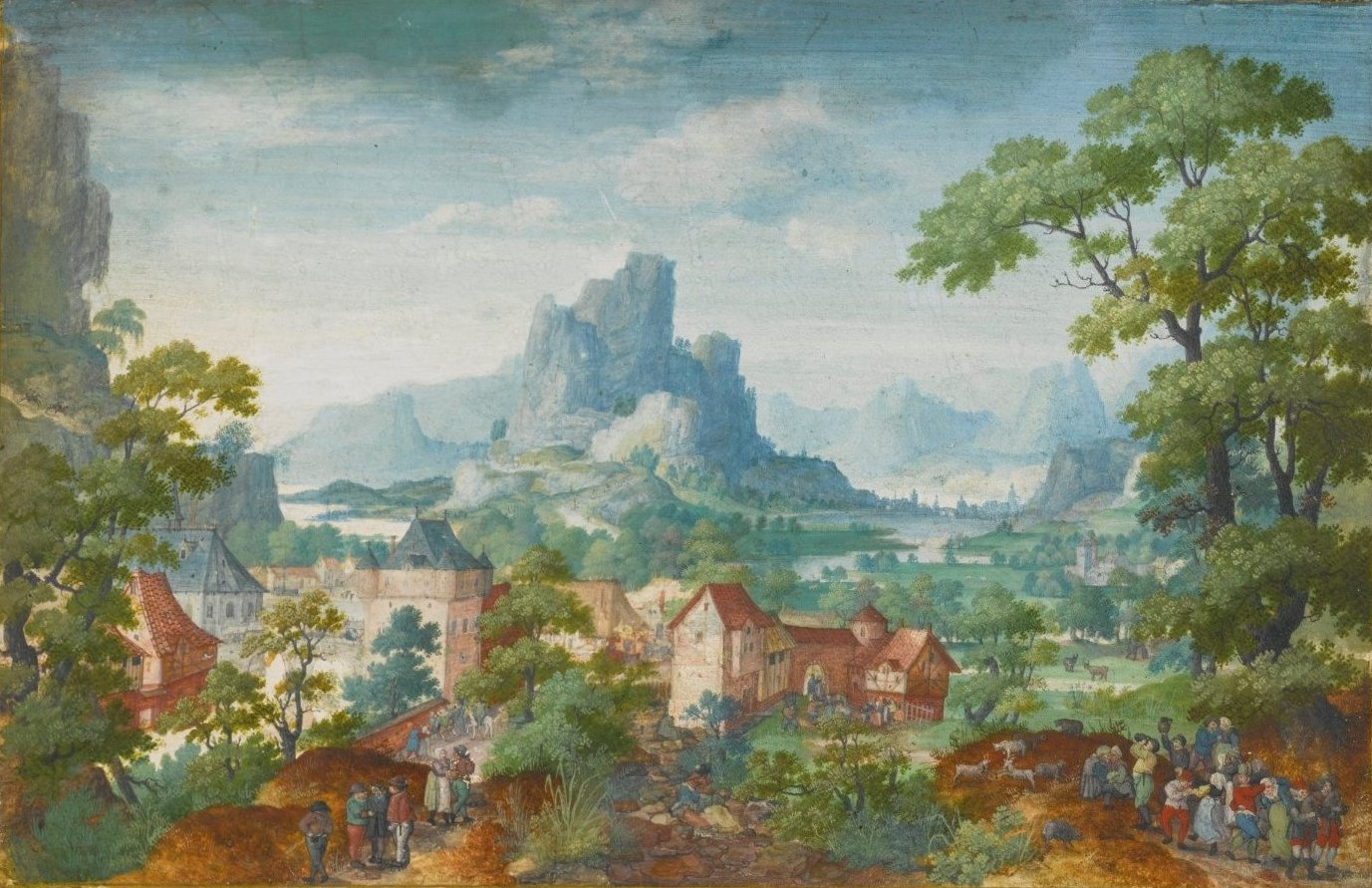
Extensive landscape with peasants merrymaking

Frans Boels (c. 1555 in Mechelen – 1596 in Amsterdam) was a Flemish painter and draftsman, who was active in the Dutch Republic in the latter part of his life. He is mainly known for his landscape paintings with biblical or mythological scenes or hunting parties.

== Life ==
Not much is known about his life and career. He was born in Mechelen and was a pupil and stepson of Hans Bol who was a successful and versatile landscape painter and draftsman. He was active in Antwerp between 1572 and 1584 and then moved to Amsterdam where he is recorded from 1584 to 1596. He probably left with his stepfather Hans Bol who fled the Southern Netherlands for religious reasons.

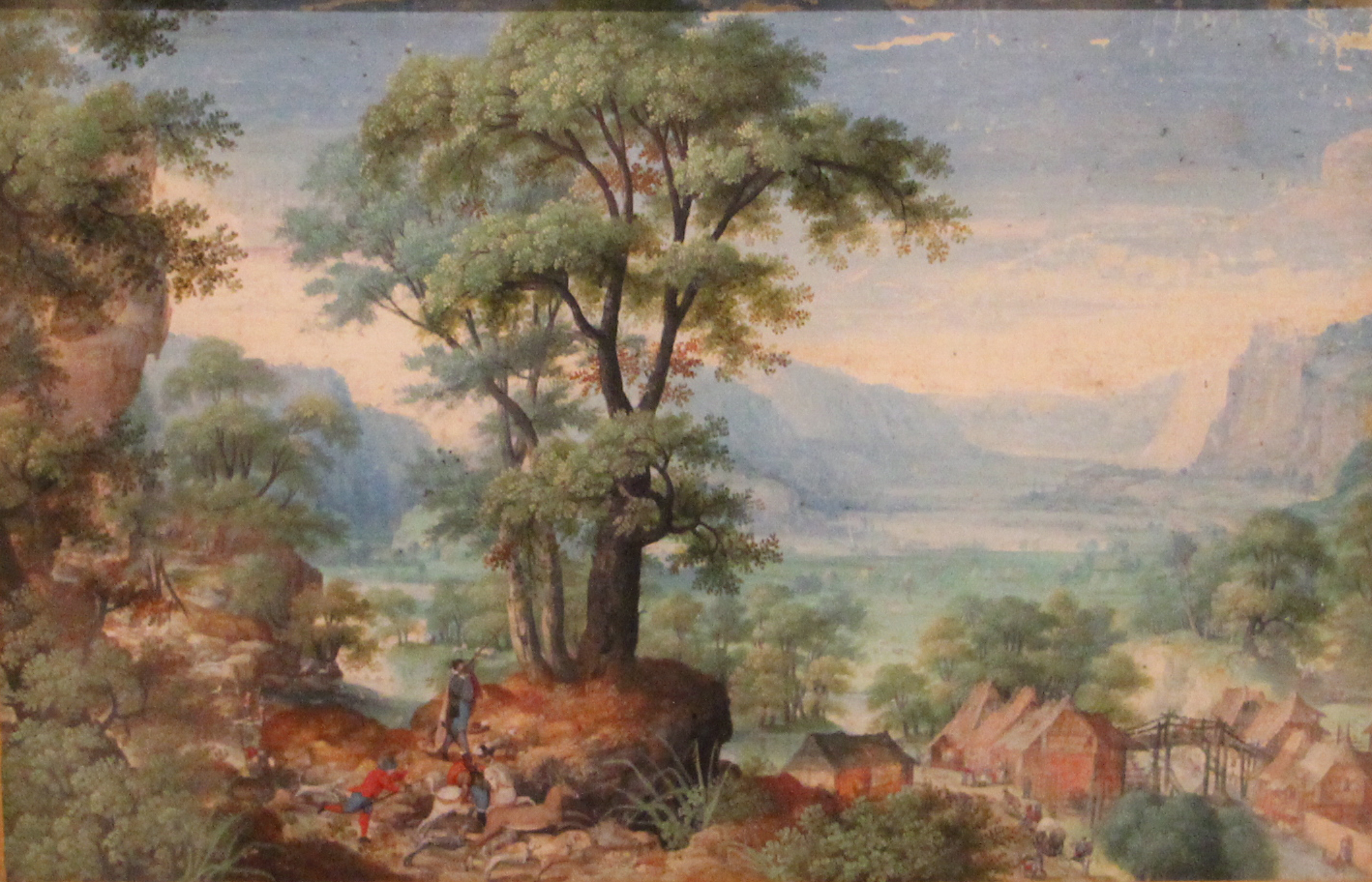
Landscape with hunters

In 1593 the Dutch engraver Hendrik Goltzius made a portrait of Hans Bol which he dedicated as a token of friendship to Bol's stepson Frans Boels.

== Work ==
Frans Boels' known oeuvre is limited. It consists of two dozen works, a majority of them in small format and executed in gouache. The early biographer Karel van Mander mentions in his Schilder-boeck of 1604 that Frans Boels was good at drawing miniature landscapes. Frans Boels' favorite subjects were Biblical or mythological scenes or hunting parties. Some depict groups of merrymaking peasants.

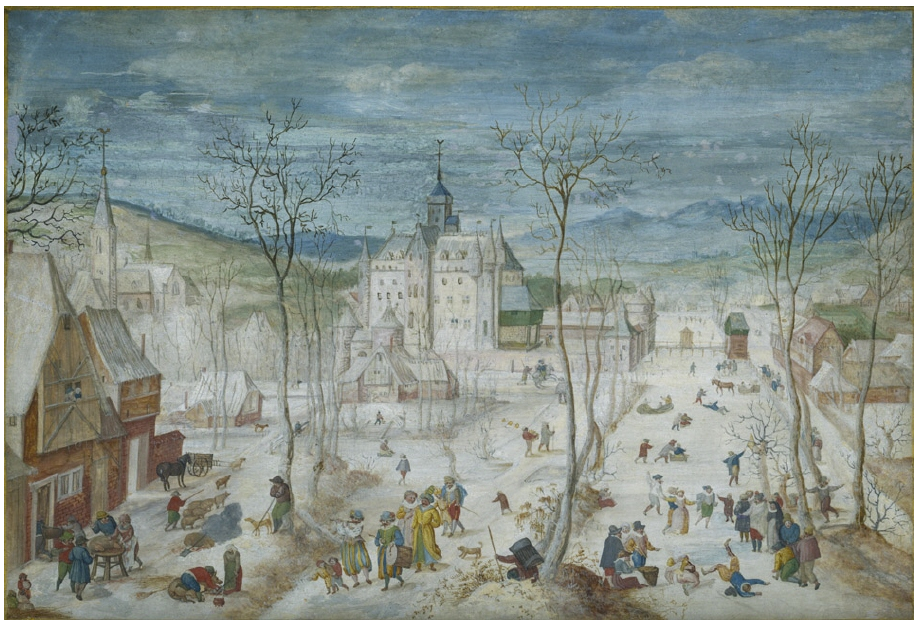
Winter

Most of his works are executed in gouache in the style and are of the same quality of those of his master Hans Bol. Some of his gouaches were previously attributed to Hans Bol. In 1588 Frans Boels created various landscapes entitled Mountainous landscape with mythological figures.
