= St John on Bethnal Green =

- Church of St John on Bethnal Green
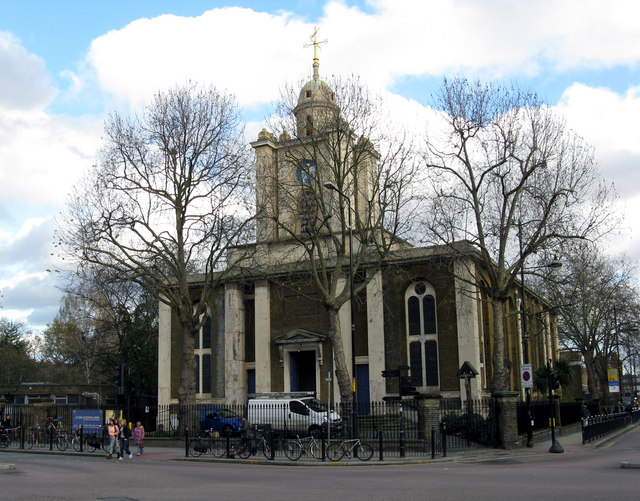
- St John on Bethnal Green
- 51.5276°N 0.0549°W
- Location: Bethnal Green, London, E2
- Country: England
- Denomination: Church of England
- Churchmanship: Modern Catholic
- Website: stjohnonbethnalgreen.church

Architecture
- Architect: Sir John Soane
- Years built: 1826–28

Administration
- Diocese: London

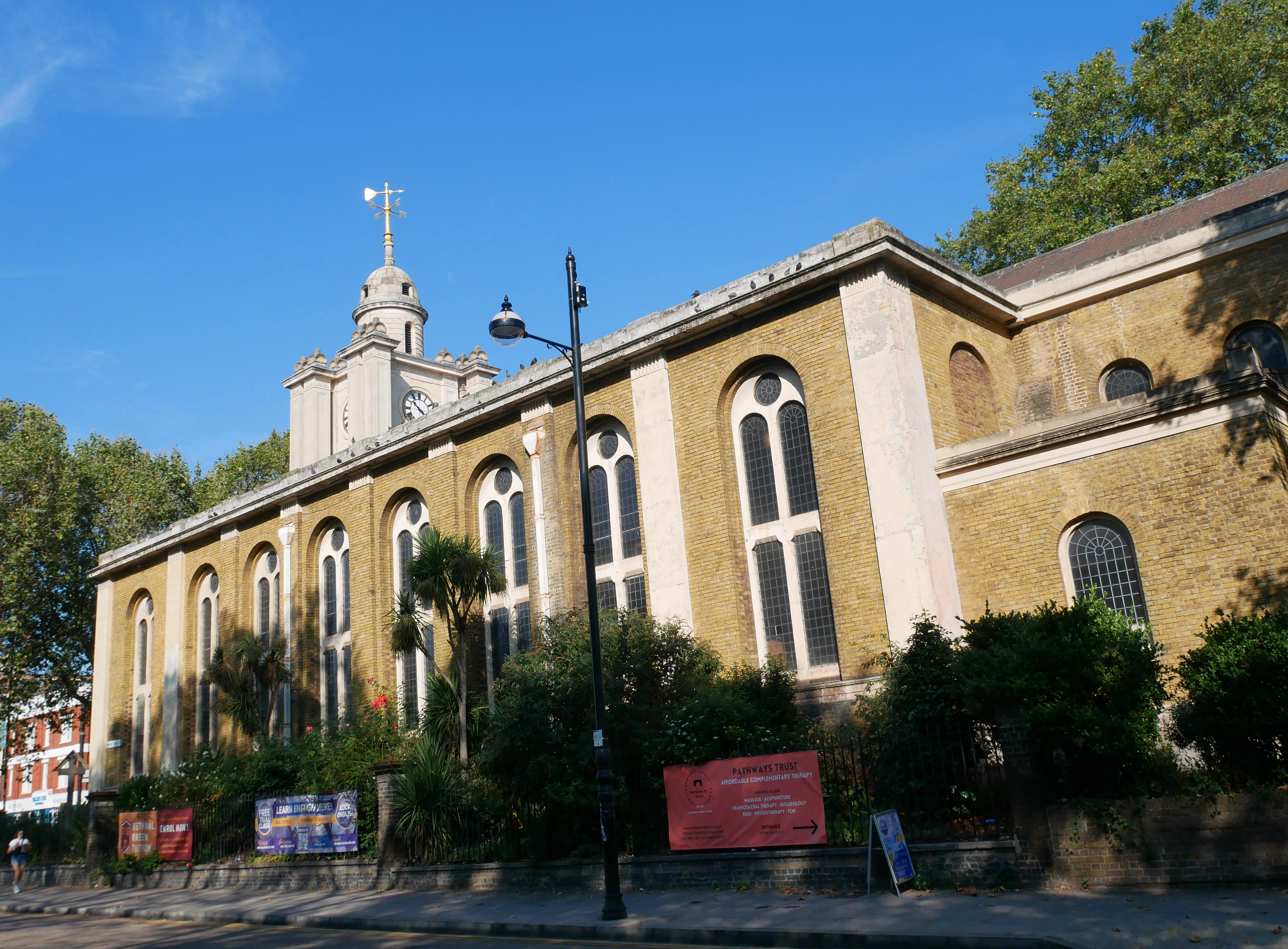
South face of the church, along Roman Road

St John on Bethnal Green is an early 19th-century church near Bethnal Green, London, and stands on the Green itself. It was constructed in 1826–1828 to the design of the architect Sir John Soane (1753–1837). It is an Anglican church in the Diocese of London. The church is near Bethnal Green tube station, on Bethnal Green Road and Roman Road. It is a Grade I listed building. The church also hosts avant garde and experimental music performances such as "White Noise 53" and Sebastian Kite's "Genius Loci". The belfry provides an exhibition space for artists.

== The Stations of the Cross ==
In 2000, the painter Chris Gollon gained a major commission from the Church of England for fourteen Stations of the Cross paintings for the church. Gollon was a controversial choice, since he is not a practising Christian. In order to carry out the commission, and for consultation on theological matters, he collaborated with Fr Alan Green, rector of the church.

== The pipe organ ==
The pipe organ in the church's west gallery was installed in 1950. It was made by the London firm of Rest Cartwright. The organ case was designed by Martin Travers.

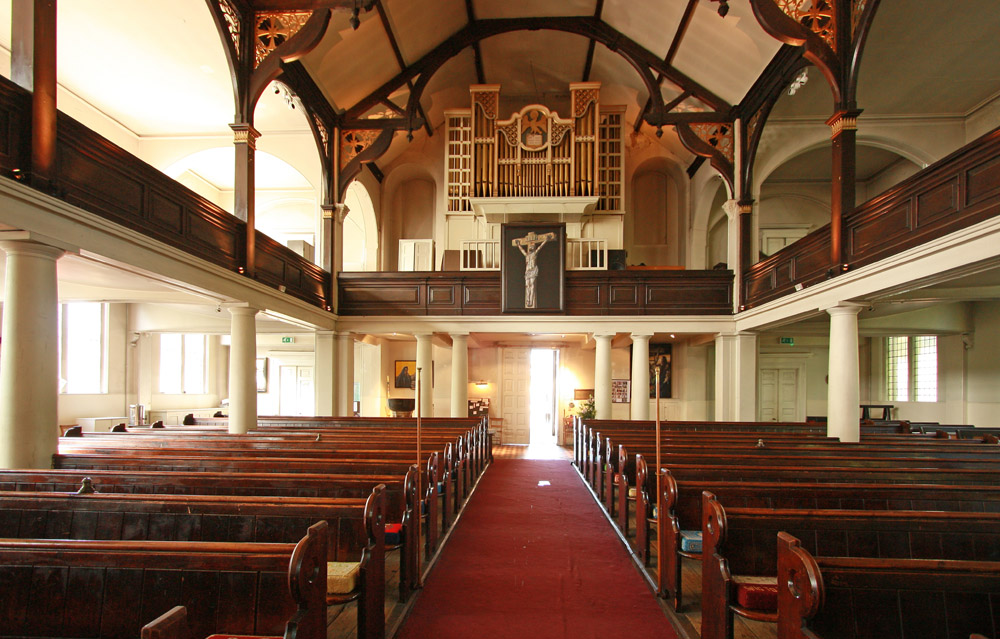

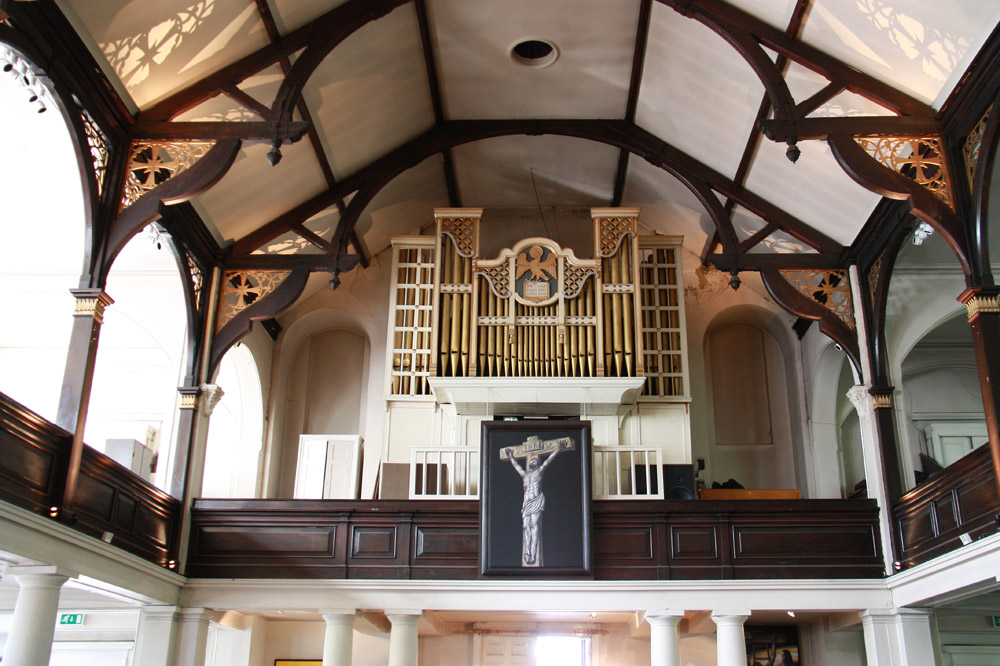
