= Tamsin Pickeral =

British author and art historian (born 1971)

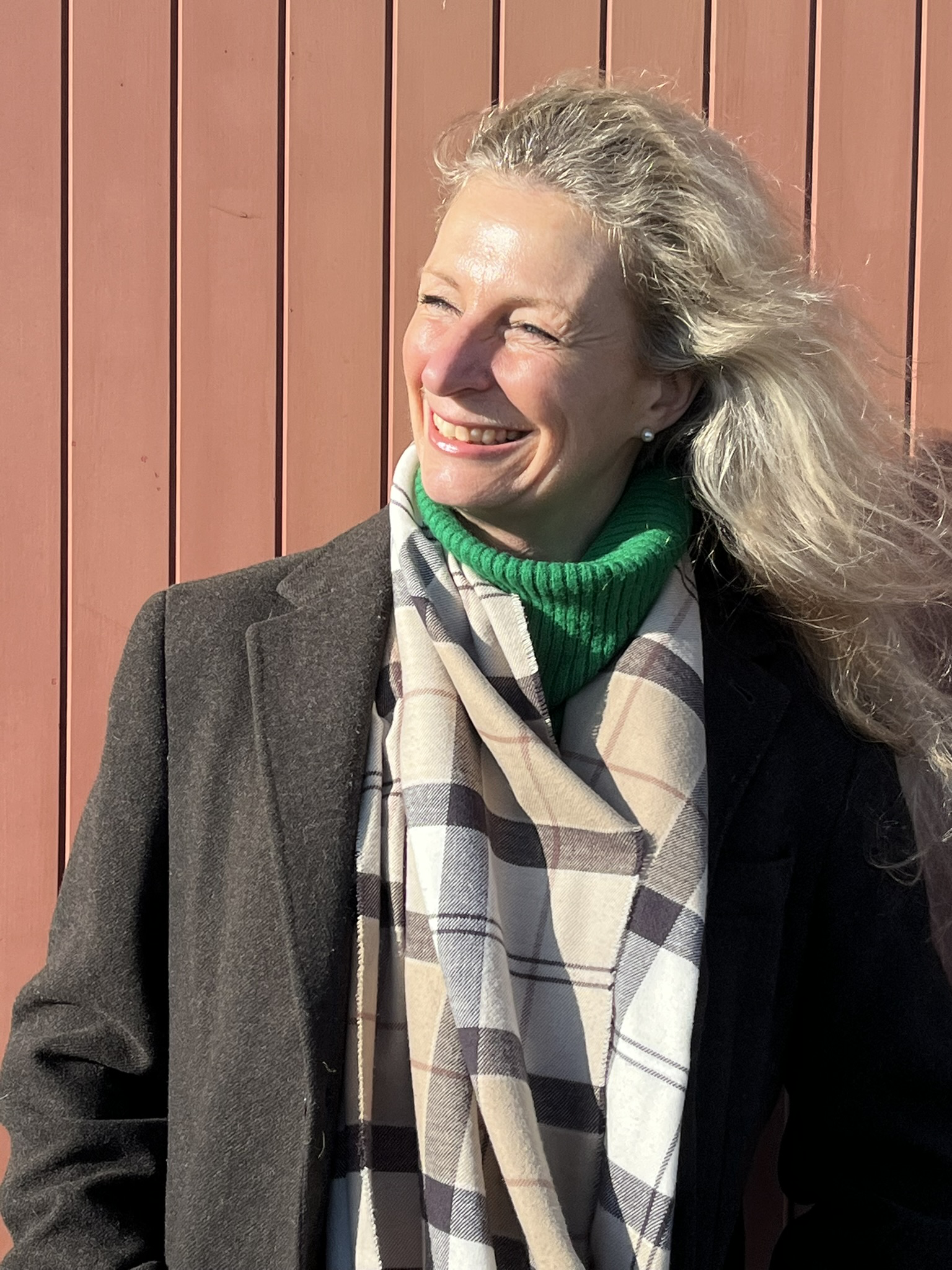
Tamsin Pickeral

Tamsin Pickeral (née Hughes; born 1971) is an English author and art historian. She is best known for her art books and books on animals.

== Early life ==
Born to parents John and Valerie, Pickeral grew up in Princes Risborough, Buckinghamshire. Following school, Pickeral won a scholarship to study History of Art and Architecture in Italy, before returning to England to study History of Art and Architecture at Reading University. She graduated with an honours degree and spent some years overseas.

== Career ==
Pickeral's first book The Encyclopedia of Horses and Ponies Parragon was published in 1999. Subsequent books on art followed (see selected publication list), before the publication of 30,000 Years of the Horse in Art in 2006, by Merrell publishers. The book received favourable reviews, being chosen as Book of the Week by the Guardian and was followed by 5,000 Years of the Dog in Art, 2008, Merrell. This book was voted one of the Financial Times Top Fifty Art Books for that year and the Sunday Times Books of the Year – Art. Pickeral has authored and co-authored over 25 books on the arts, animals (horses, dogs and cats) and travel. The Majesty of the Horse, 2011 written with photography by Astrid Harrisson involved travelling to a variety of countries including Russia, Kazakhstan, Mongolia and China and was followed by The Spirit of the Dog, 2012 and The Grace of the Cat, 2013.

Pickeral's latest book, The Invention of the Dog, was published by Thames & Hudson in September 2026. The book looks at the fascinating history and evolution of the dog, bringing together histories, genetics and interesting fun facts. It is beautifully illustrated with artwork reproductions and historic photographs.

In 2010, Pickeral wrote Humanity in Art, a monograph based on the leading contemporary British figurative artist Chris Gollon. Gollon tragically died in 2017, and in 2024 the posthumous film Chris Gollon Life In Paint was released at the Barbican, with Pickeral narrating part of the film. The film formed part of the Doc n Roll Film Festival and is being shown in New York in 2025.

In 2012, Pickeral carried out freelance writing and marketing work for London-based construction company Szerelmey before taking on a full-time role with the company the following year. In 2019 she was appointed Operations Director, becoming the first female director in the company’s history. In 2022 she was asked to become a Co-Chairwoman of Women in Natural Stone, by the Stone Federation of Great Britain.

== Selected publications ==
- The Encyclopedia of Horses and Ponies, 1999, Parragon
- Turner, Whistler, Monet, 2005, Flametree
- Mackintosh, 2005, Flametree
- The Horse: 30,000 Years of the Horse in Art, 2006, Merrell
- The Horse Lover's Bible: The Complete Practical Guide to …, 2006, Carroll and Brown
- Van Gogh, 2007, Flametree
- Impressionism, 2007, Flametree
- The Dog: 5000 Years of the Dog in Art, 2008, Merrell
- Secrets of Tuscany, 2008, Flametree
- Britain: Landmarks, Landscapes and Hidden Treasures, 2008, Flametree
- Budget Horse and Pony Care: Cost-Effective Horse Management, 2009, Kenilworth Press
- 50 Paintings You Should Know, 2009, Prestel
- The Taste of Ireland: Landscape, Culture and Food, 2009, Starfire
- Chris Gollon: Humanity in Art (2010)
- Monet, 2011, Flametree
- The Majesty of the Horse: An Illustrated History, 2011, Collins
- The Spirit of the Dog: An Illustrated History, 2012, Frances Lincoln
- The Grace of the Cat: An Illustrated History, 2013, Frances Lincoln
- Dogs Unleashed, 2014, Thunderbay
- The Invention of the Dog, 2026, Thames & Hudson
