= Hyde and Hughes Publishing =

Book publishing company

Hyde and Hughes Publishing is a book publishing company.

Hyde & Hughes is an independent publisher of fine art books. For example, it published Chris Gollon: Humanity in Art by Tamsin Pickeral on the painter Chris Gollon in 2010.
