= Chris Gollon =

British painter (1953–2017)

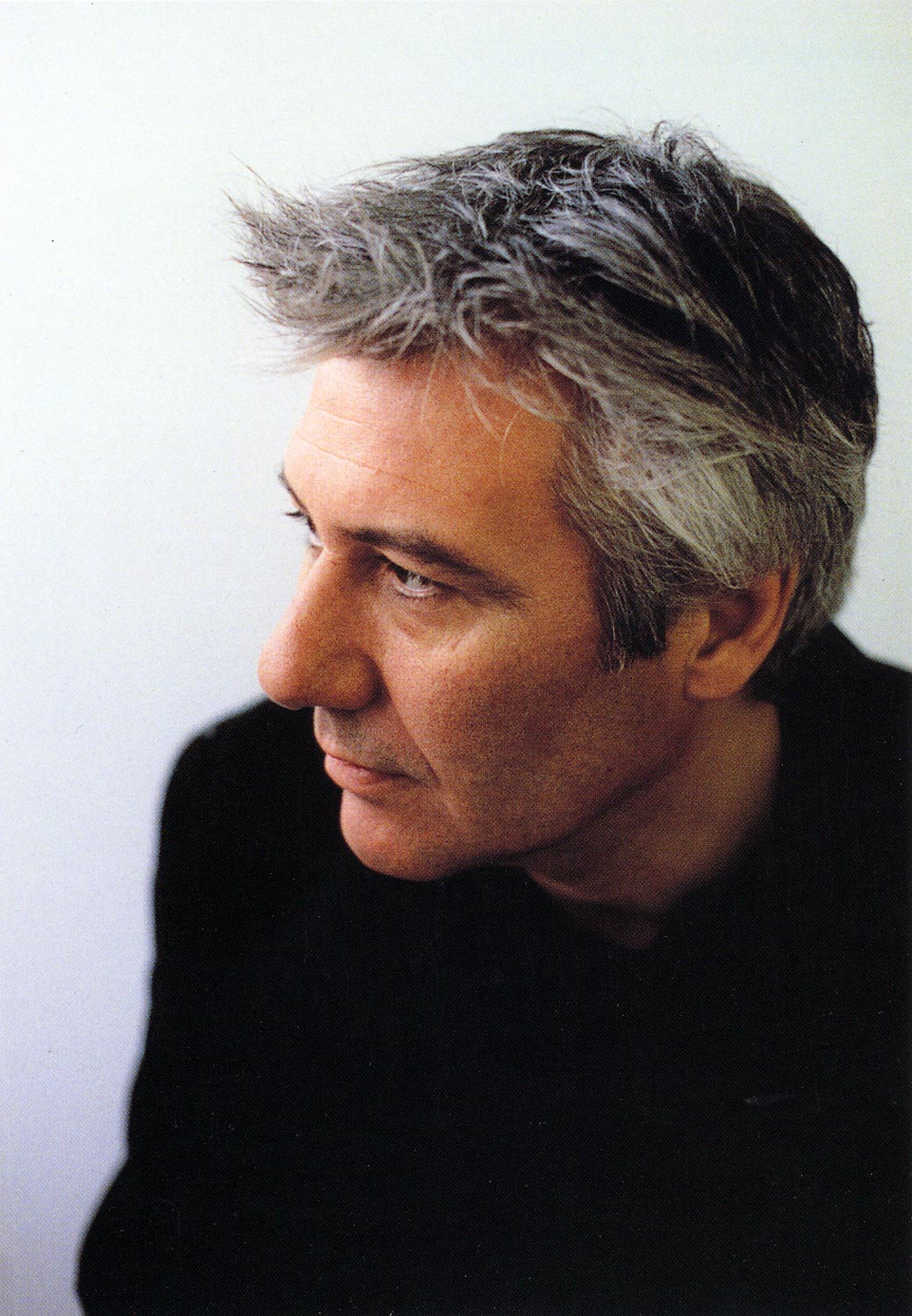
- Chris Gollon in his island studio
- Born: 14 January 1953; London, United Kingdom
- Died: 25 April 2017 (aged 64); United Kingdom
- Known for: Painting, printmaking
- Style: Figurative art

Chris Gollon (1953–2017) was a British artist.

Born in London, England, Chris Gollon was a technically innovative painter, bringing both Old Master techniques and printmaking methods into the medium of acrylic. Until his death in 2017, he had a 19-year interest in artistic boundary crossing, often using music or collaborating directly with musicians and songwriters. He lived and worked in Surrey. He regularly exhibited in London and Monmouth with IAP Fine Art. He had many solo museum exhibitions in the United Kingdom and has works in museum collections including the British Museum.

== Work ==
House of Sleep by Chris Gollon, 48 in × 36 in (122 cm × 91 cm), acrylic on panel, 1998, first exhibited in 'ROOT' at the Chisenhale Gallery, London

In 1989, Gollon was a finalist in The Spectator Prize. His first solo museum exhibition was at the Ferens Art Gallery in Hull in 1993, which was then Museum Gallery of the Year. The exhibition was televised on BBC Look North. Chris Gollon was a friend of The Skids and enjoyed the company of musicians. In 1998, he exhibited with David Bowie, Yoko Ono, and Gavin Turk in 'ROOT', created by Thurston Moore of Sonic Youth, a crossover exhibition of contemporary music and art at Chisenhale Gallery, London. For 'ROOT', Thurston Moore sent Gollon a 52-second tape and challenged him to make either a work of music or art in response. Gollon produced a painting entitled 'House of Sleep' for the 'ROOT' exhibition, which began his nineteen-year fascination with artistic boundary crossing, and how one art form can take another into new areas of thought and feeling, and vice versa. 'House of Sleep' sold into a private collection in 1998, but it was loaned for the museum retrospective in 2019 at Huddersfield Art Gallery, in the catalogue for which Thurston Moore wrote "Chris Gollon's work moves beyond painting as singular expression, where music and its essence of spiritual sentience, comes into accord, creating a personal yet welcoming environment, alive and free. I am proud to have had a moment where we colluded via the gestures of mutual acquaintance. His creative and modest genius is eternal."

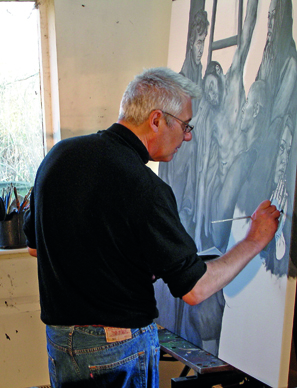
Chris Gollon in his studio in Surrey, painting Stations of the Cross XIII: Jesus is Taken Down from the Cross

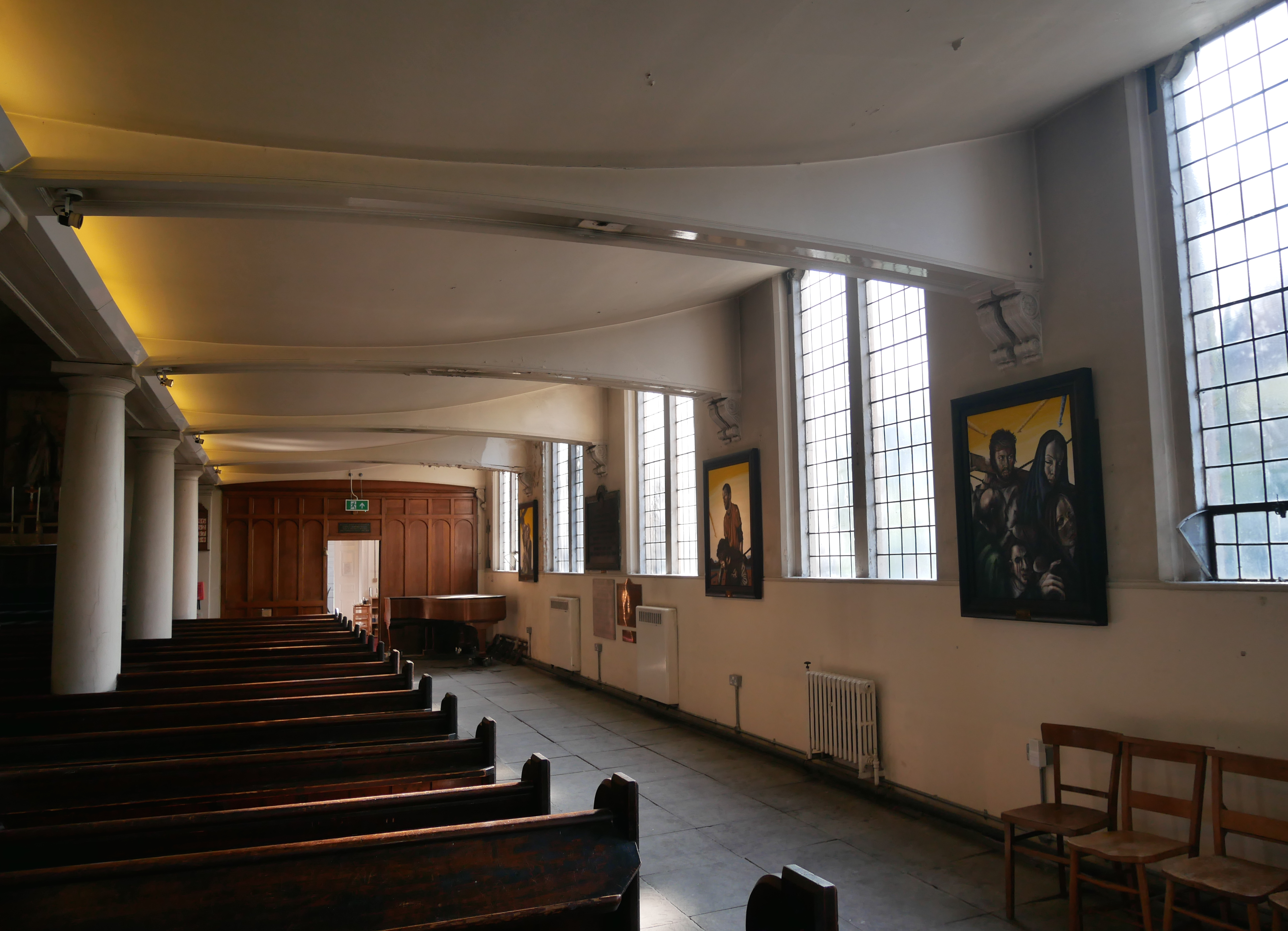
South aisle of St John on Bethnal Green in London, including some of Chris Gollon's Stations of the Cross series of paintings

In 2000, Gollon gained a commission from the Church of England for fourteen Stations of the Cross paintings for a Grade I listed London church designed by Sir John Soane, St John on Bethnal Green, located next to the V&A Museum of Childhood. Gollon was a controversial choice since he was not a practising Christian. In order to carry out the commission, and for theological matters, he agreed to collaborate with Fr Alan Green, Rector of the church.

In 2001, a special exhibition of his work was held at the River & Rowing Museum in Henley-on-Thames, because until 2005 Gollon had a connection with the river, having a studio on Platts Eyot, a private island on the River Thames near Hampton Court west of London. The museum, aided by the Victoria and Albert Museum, acquired a work by Gollon entitled Big Fish Eat Little Fish, a centrepiece of the exhibition.

Einstein & The Jealous Monk by Chris Gollon, 2004

His painting of the fourth Station of the Cross (Jesus meets his Mother) was shown in the exhibition Presence: Images of Christ for the Third Millennium in St Paul's Cathedral in 2004, along with works by Bill Viola, Tracey Emin, Maggi Hambling and Craigie Aitchison. In the same year, he began painting images of Albert Einstein, before the 50th anniversary of Einstein's death in 2005 and before the centenary in 2005 of the General Theory of Relativity. Partially inspired by a lyric in Bob Dylan's ballad "Desolation Row", Chris Gollon painted Einstein & The Jealous Monk. This painting was subsequently purchased by the Huddersfield Art Gallery in West Yorkshire, where it hangs in the museum's permanent collection alongside Sir Jacob Epstein's bust of Einstein, and works by Francis Bacon, Walter Sickert, Henry Moore and L.S. Lowry.

In 2007, Chris Gollon was commissioned to paint the Henley Regatta by Paul Mainds, Chief Executive of the River & Rowing Museum. The museum's collection holds Raoul Dufy's painting 'Regatta at Henley'. Since the Henley Royal Regatta has no silver or bronze medals, only win or lose, Gollon decided to focus with great empathy on the losing crew. The final work entitled "Gollon at Henley" was unveiled in 2008, and is now displayed along with works by Dufy, John Piper, and Julian Trevelyan in the museum's permanent collection.

A chance meeting in 2005 between Chris Gollon and filmmakers JABOD led to the creation of a neologism, and a new cinematic artwork: "Kaleidomorphism One". Fifteen years of Gollon's paintings and imagery, together with music that he has selected (including Calexico and Paolo Conte), combine with JABOD's design, rhythm, and effects to create a film installation of 20 minutes length. Kaleidomorphism One premiered at the East End Film Festival in 2008.

In 2009, Chris Gollon was invited to become a Fellow and first Artist in Residence at the Institute of Advanced Study (Durham), Durham University, where he took part in the Being Human research project and worked with some of the world's leading thinkers to describe 'being human' in the 21st century, with subject areas such as 'Mind/Consciousness', 'Abjection/Bare Life', 'War', 'Migration' and 'Home'. He produced 16 paintings in 10 weeks on the "Being Human" theme, all of which are reproduced in the 52-page exhibition catalogue "BEING HUMAN: Paintings by Chris Gollon", published by Durham University. The catalogue includes texts on Gollon's work by Tamsin Pickeral, Prof. Ash Amin, Prof. Frances Bartkowski, Prof. Eduardo Mendieta, Ulisses Barres de Almeida, Adi Ophir, Prof. Ingo Gildenhard, and a poem "Human" by Michael O'Neill.

Also in 2009, after nine years in the making, Gollon's series of paintings of the Fourteen Stations of the Cross was installed in the Church of St John on Bethnal Green in East London. They were blessed by the Bishop of London, Richard Chartres, in March 2009. In the same month, British novelist Sara Maitland's book Stations of the Cross, inspired by and featuring Gollon's paintings, was published. The book also contains a text by Fr Alan Green about the story of the commission and his personal collaboration with the artist. To bring the story closer, Gollon used his own son as the model for Jesus, his daughter as Mary, and Fr Alan Green as Nicodemus. Gollon's Fourteen Stations of the Cross are site-specific and permanently installed. They are both an active aid to worship and also make the Church of St John on Bethnal Green a visitor attraction in East London.

In 2010, art historian Tamsin Pickeral's book 'Chris Gollon: Humanity in Art' on Chris Gollon's life and work was published by Hyde and Hughes. It features 180 illustrations of his paintings and tells the story of his life and work to 2010, including chapters on his Stations of the Cross and the Being Human series of paintings. The book is endorsed on the cover by Bill Bryson.

In December 2010, Chris Gollon's paintings "Jesus as the Man of Sorrows" and "Mater Dolorosa" were shown in the exhibition 'Commission' at Wallspace Gallery, London, a survey exhibition of the last 40 years of religious commissions for public spaces, which included work by Henry Moore, Anthony Gormley, Chris Gollon, and Damien Hirst. A book entitled 'Contemporary Art in British Churches' was published by Art & Christianity Enquiry to accompany the exhibition.

In January 2011, the British Museum acquired 'Magdalene', an etching by Chris Gollon, for its permanent collection. The work was also featured in Tamsin Pickeral's book 'Humanity in Art'. Chris Gollon was Artist in Residence at St Mary's College, Durham University, from April to June 2011, where he began a series of paintings on the ancient theme of Love. The same year, Gollon's painting 'Birth' was used in the Hollywood film Breaking Dawn, from the Twilight series.

In 2012, The Art of Chris Gollon app for iPads was launched, in association with IAP Fine Art and Liquitex. Gollon's solo show in Guildford Cathedral Incarnation, Mary & Women from The Bible (28 January – 3 March 2014), was accompanied by a 40-page colour catalogue entitled Incarnation, Mary & Women from The Bible reproducing all 16 paintings, edited by David Tregunna and with texts by Sara Maitland, Tamsin Pickeral, Canon Dr Andrew Bishop and Canon Dr Julie Gittoes. In 2013, Gollon began a 41 ft long painting entitled 'And It Came To Pass' that is also a 50–50 collaboration with Grammy-nominated Chinese classical virtuoso musician and occasional composer Yi Yao. This collaborative work was premiered—as part of the programme—at the Henley Festival 2014, where Yi Yao and her ensemble performed her composition twice each evening beside Chris Gollon's painting. The music journalist Philip Clark for Gramophone magazine has interviewed Will Self, Iain Sinclair, and Chris Gollon, about the influence of music on their work.

Chris Gollon's solo exhibition 'Incarnation, Mary and Women from the Bible' exhibited in Guildford Cathedral in 2014 became a national touring exhibition to British cathedrals during 2015–2016, travelling to the cathedrals of Norwich, Chichester, Durham, and Hereford. The exhibition at Chichester brought media attention since Gollon painted what is widely believed to be the first-ever image in art history of Judas Iscariot's wife. In 2016, it also went to Romsey Abbey, where Gollon painted a diptych of the Abbey's 10th-century abbess St Ethelflaeda.

In 2015, Chris Gollon began an exercise in artistic 'boundary crossing' with Irish singer-songwriter Eleanor McEvoy. This to "Naked Music", both an Eleanor McEvoy album (partially inspired by a Gollon painting 'Champagne Sheila') and a series of Gollon paintings inspired by the songs. In January 2016, the album was launched in London in an exhibition of Gollon's paintings, partially inspired by the songs. Gollon has said that Eleanor McEvoy's lyrics take him into an area of female thought to which he did not previously have access, prompting many new images. This successful collaboration led to McEvoy's first songbook "Naked Music: The Songbook", which features interviews with Gollon and McEvoy as well as many of the songs and paintings. The same year, inspired by Gollon's painting 'Dreaming of Leaving', Eleanor McEvoy wrote the song 'Gimme Some Wine' (released in autumn 2019 on a special CD to accompany a Chris Gollon museum exhibition at Huddersfield Art Gallery; but music and words in Naked Music The Songbook p.52). During 2016–2017, inspired by this new song, and the fact Eleanor McEvoy remarked she enjoyed Picasso's Blue Period, Gollon painted a new series of paintings entitled 'Gimme Some Wine', which were shown a first time at IAP Fine Art, Monmouth, in March 2017, with a LIVE performance of the song by Eleanor McEvoy. All the paintings from Gollon's 'Gimme Some Wine Series', which were the last series of paintings on a single theme he painted, were published by IAP Fine Art in the monograph 'Gimme Some Wine'. In a tribute to Chris Gollon, Eleanor McEvoy used Gollon's painting 'Gimme Some Wine - Final Version' on the cover of her 2021 album 'Gimme Some Wine' featuring the song of the same title she had written and dedicated to the artist.

In 2017, the last interview with Chris Gollon regarding his secular paintings and the influence of music appeared in Nick Soulsby's book Thurston Moore: We Sing A New Language. In this interview, Gollon explains the combination of the atmospheric 52-second tape Thurston Moore sent him, which also prompted the memory of a scene from the 1972 Robert Redford film 'Jeremiah Johnson', both helped him create the image 'House of Sleep' for the 1998 'ROOT' exhibition at Chisenhale Gallery, London.

In 2018, the last interview with Chris Gollon regarding his religious works was published in Mark Byford's book The Annunciation: A Pilgrim's Quest. Chris Gollon's painting 'Annunciation' is featured in the book and was also displayed at the book's launch in Winchester Cathedral, April 2018. The same year, Romsey Abbey purchased and permanently installed Chris Gollon's site-specific diptych 'St Ethelflaeda', which had remained in the Abbey since his exhibition in 2016. To mark the blessing and permanent installation of this work, in October 2018 a fine art catalogue St Ethelflaeda: diptych by Chris Gollon with texts by Sara Maitland, Mark Byford, Tamsin Pickeral, Canon Dr Julie Gittoes, Jonathan Koestlé-Cate, was published by IAP Fine Art, in association with Romsey Abbey. The Very Revd Catherine Ogle, Dean of Winchester, writes in the catalogue: "I've really come to love Chris Gollon's work and the expressive ways that he represents the human form with exaggeration creating a greater realism." The fine art catalogue also documents and reproduces, for the first time, some of the images that Chris Gollon added to his 2014–2016 touring exhibition to cathedrals, those that do not appear in the Incarnation, Mary & Women from the Bible catalogue. These include 'Judas's Wife' (thought to be the first image in art history of her), 'Jesus Heals the Sick' (first shown in Durham Cathedral, 2015) and 'Jesus & The Woman Taken in Adultery (Jesus Draws in the Dust)' (a large triptych also first shown in Durham Cathedral, 2015).

In 2019, a private collector donated three Gollon paintings to St John on Bethnal Green. They were installed permanently in the South Gallery of the church, and were subsequently blessed by the Bishop of Stepney in October of the same year. One is a study for 'Jesus Takes Up His Cross', which was painted before Gollon took the decision to use his own son as the model for Jesus. The second is entitled 'At The Base of the Crucifixion', depicting the same child from Station (II) beside the Magdalene at the base of the Cross. The third painting is a large canvas, believed to be the only painting in art history of Judas alone with the Magdalene. Gollon cast himself as Judas, hanging himself from a tree while the Magdalene looks on. This work, painted in 2004, takes partial inspiration from Bob Dylan's song 'With God on our Side'. It is also significant, since although Gollon used his son, daughter, wife, and friends in his 'Fourteen Stations of the Cross', he did not paint himself in them. In October 2019, Gollon's first museum retrospective entitled 'CHRIS GOLLON: Beyond the Horizon' opened at Huddersfield Art Gallery, a three-month exhibition focusing solely on his music-related works. Gollon is quoted in the museum exhibition catalogue:

"Easel painting has been declared dead pretty much since easel painting has existed, but at a time when most people relate to imagery through film, painters must find new ways to relate their work to people."

The exhibition demonstrates the three ways Chris Gollon used music to relate his imagery to the spectator, and it includes works from his collaborations with Thurston Moore, Yi Yao, and Eleanor McEvoy, as well as paintings partially inspired by Neil Young and Bob Dylan. The exhibition is also the UK premiere of a collaborative work of art, music and film, entitled FIREWALL, which combines the track 'Firewall' by the Sleaford Mods with Gollon's imagery, produced by IAP Fine Art.

In 2024, Gollon's 'Fourteen Stations of the Cross' were featured in episode one of 'Gareth Malone's Easter Passion' on BBC1. The same year the feature-length documentary 'Chris Gollon: Life in Paint' was completed, directed by Mark Calderbank and produced by Peter Dunphy; featuring Maggi Hambling, Thurston Moore, André Portasio, Sara Maitland, Tamsin Pickeral and Eleanor McEvoy.

In December 2025, Chris Gollon’s ‘Virgin & Child’ was re-installed in Guildford Cathedral, on a long term loan from the Chris Gollon Estate. For the duration of Lent 2026, Chris Gollon’s painting ‘Magdalene at the Base of the Cross’ was displayed beside the High Altar in Southwark Cathedral, on loan from a private collection. It was accompanied by a one-night public screening of the documentary ‘CHRIS GOLLON: Life in Paint’ (85mins).

== Bibliography ==
- Gollon, Chris (1997). Tregunna, David (ed.). Recent Paintings. Road to Narragonia. Independent Art Promotions. ISBN 978-0-9530584-0-2. (Foreword by Mary Rose Beaumont.)
- In the Shadow of the Pleasuredome, recent paintings by Chris Gollon. IAP Fine Art. 1999. ISBN 978-0-9530584-9-5.
- Gollon, Chris (2001). New Images. IAP Fine Art. ISBN 978-0-9530584-5-7.
- Being Human: paintings by Chris Gollon. Durham University / IAP Fine Art. 2009. ISBN 978-0-9561840-1-6.
- Pickeral, Tamsin (2010). Chris Gollon: Humanity in Art. Hyde and Hughes. ISBN 978-0-9563851-0-9. OCLC 499078574.
- Incarnation, Mary and Women from The Bible. IAP Fine Art. 2014. ISBN 978-0-9530584-4-0.
- Naked Music: The Songbook. Dublin: Hot Press. 2016. ISBN 978-0-9576114-2-9. OCLC 962483990. (In association with Eleanor McEvoy and Chris Gollon, foreword and interviews by Jackie Hayden.)
- Tregunna, David, ed. (2018). St Ethelflaeda: Diptych by Chris Gollon. IAP Fine Art, in association with Romsey Abbey. ISBN 978-0-9530584-7-1.
- Tregunna, David, ed. (2019). Chris Gollon: Fourteen Stations of the Cross. IAP Fine Art, in association with St John on Bethnal Green. ISBN 978-0-9530584-1-9.
- Gollon, Chris (2019). Tregunna, David (ed.). Beyond the Horizon. IAP Fine Art, in association with Huddersfield Art Gallery & Kirklees Council. ISBN 978-0-9530584-3-3.
