= Hans Bol =

Flemish painter, miniature painter, print artist and draftsman (1534–1593)

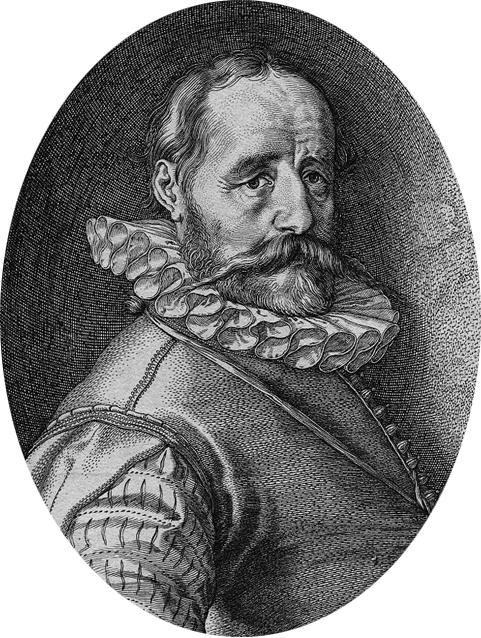
Hans Bol by Hendrick Goltzius, (1593).

Hans Bol or Jan Bol (16 December 1534 – 20 November 1593), was a Flemish painter, miniature painter, print artist and draftsman. He is known for his landscapes, allegorical and biblical scenes, and genre paintings executed in a late Northern Mannerist style.

After a successful career in Flanders, he left his home country for the Dutch Republic during the Siege of Antwerp. His landscape work had an important influence on the next generation of Dutch landscape painters. His prints after his own designs as well as those of Flemish masters such as Pieter Brueghel the Elder contributed to the spread of their themes in the Northern Netherlands.

== Life ==
Bol was born in Mechelen as the son of Simon Bol en Catherina van den Stock. He was a member of a family 'of good descent'. He received his first training in Mechelen from his two uncles Jacob Bol I and Jan Bol who were painters. He was apprenticed to a local canvas painter at the age of fourteen. He was trained in the local tradition of 'water-verwers' (water-painter) or 'doekschilders' (canvas painters). He travelled in Germany spending time in Heidelberg from 1550 to 1552. He returned to Mechelen in 1560 where he was admitted as a master of the Mechelen Guild of Saint Luke on 20 February 1560.

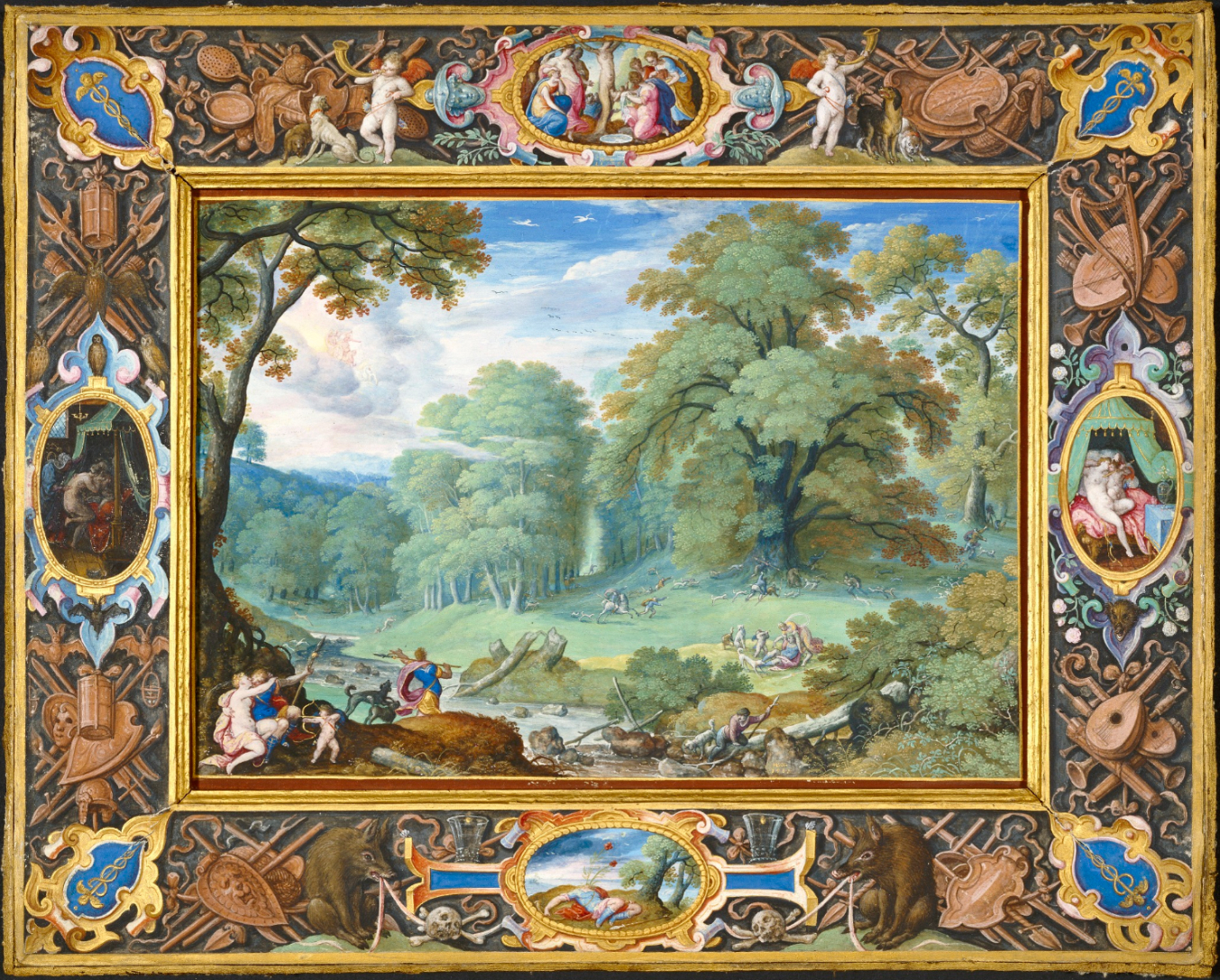
Landscape with the Story of Venus and Adonis

After the fall of Calvinist Mechelen to the Spanish in 1572, he left his hometown for Antwerp where he became a master in the local Guild of Saint Luke in 1574. In 1575 he became a poorter of Antwerp. When 10 years later Antwerp was besieged by the Spanish, Hans Bol left the Southern Netherlands in 1584 following in the footsteps of his brother Jacob, who had already left for Dordrecht in 1578. He travelled first to Bergen-op-Zoom where he had spent time before in 1578–1579. In 1586 he left for Dordrecht and then travelled via Delft to Amsterdam where he resided until his death. He died in 1593 of the plague.

His pupils included his stepson Frans Boels (who was the son of Hans Bol's wife with her first husband), Joris Hoefnagel, Jacob Savery (I) and Rommert van Beve. Gillis van Coninxloo and David Vinckboons are also believed to have been his pupils.

== Work ==
Hans Bol was a versatile painter who created oil paintings, watercolor paintings, illuminated manuscripts, drawings and engravings. He also created mythological, allegorical and biblical scenes and genre paintings. Bol is mainly remembered for his landscape art but he also played an important role in the further development and spread of the visual models and themes of Pieter Bruegel the Elder. These themes included peasant scenes.

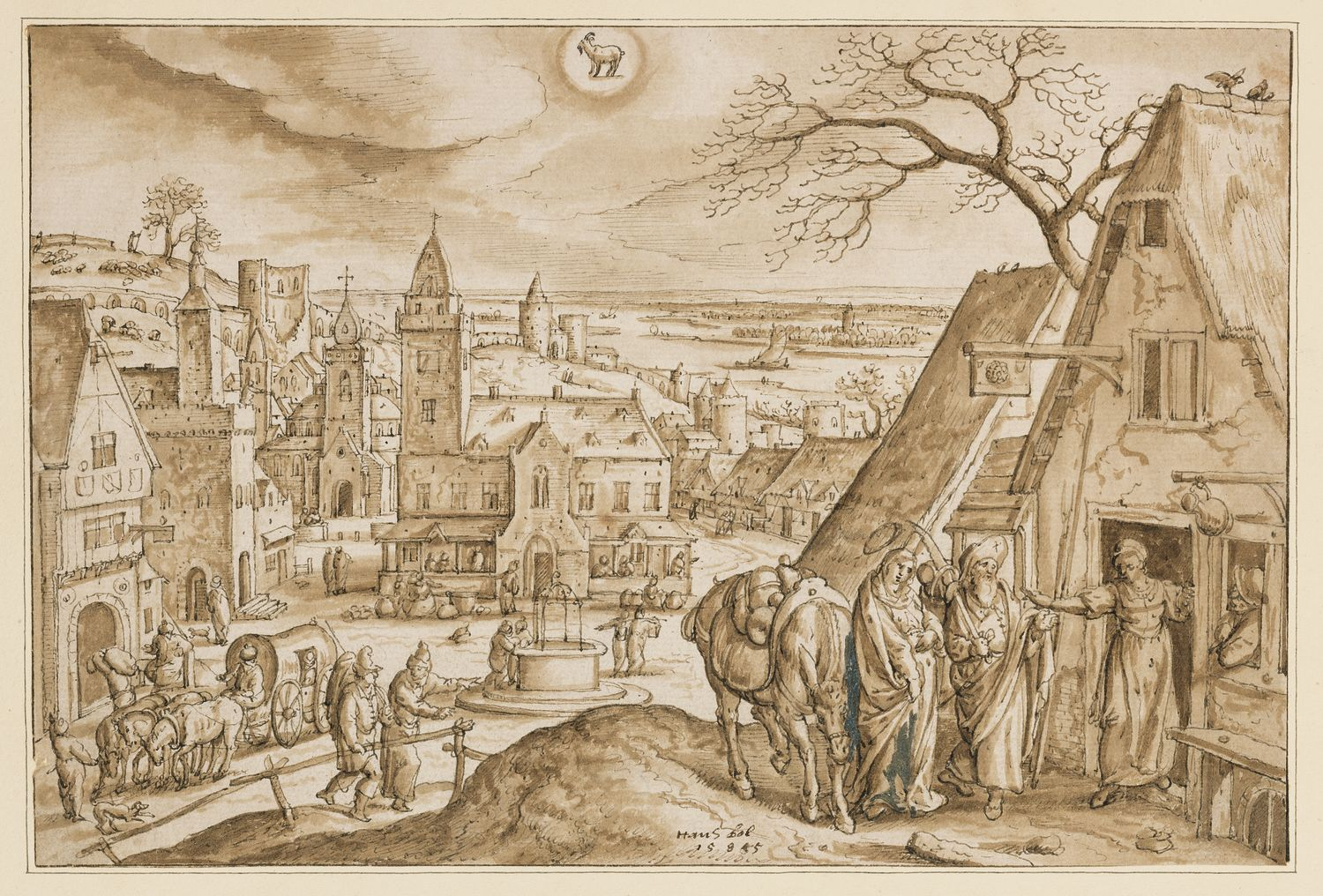
December

He started out as a painter of watercolour and tempera on canvas. Little of Bol's work in this perishable medium has survived. These works served at the time as a more affordable alternative for tapestries in the decoration of walls. Hans Bol achieved considerable success in this typical Mechelen specialty, which led to his designs becoming widely copied and even sold under his name. Bol therefore abandoned these large-scale works in favour of very small-sized works, which would be more difficult to copy by others. He built a reputation with his miniature drawings minutely finished in colours on parchment.

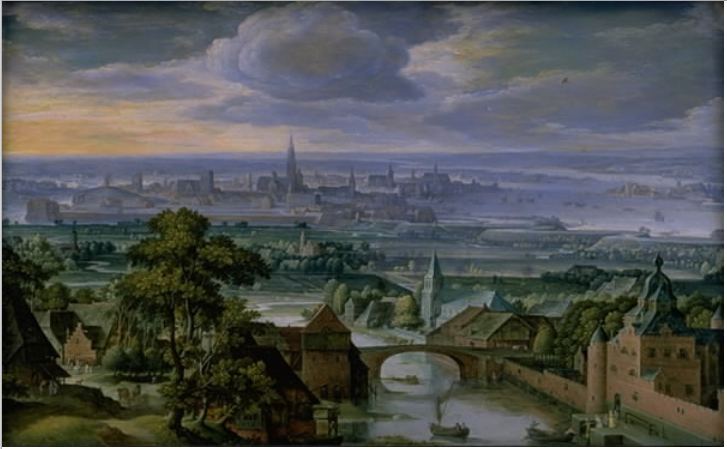
Landscape with a View of Antwerp

Bol is principally known for his extensive graphic oeuvre of both uncoloured drawings and prints. His earliest known drawing depicting a Landscape with trees and a watermill (signed and dated 1557, Museum Boijmans Van Beuningen) shows the influence of Pieter Bruegel the Elder. In the drawing Bol distanced himself from the Flemish tradition of the world landscape with its imaginary mountain landscapes with jagged rocks in favor of a more realistic approach based on observation of nature. The drawing also points to Bol's possible familiarity with the work of the Master of the Small Landscapes, an unidentified artist from that time whose drawings for two series of prints show innovative, idealized rural scenes from around Antwerp in 1559 and in 1661. The Master of the Small Landscapes depicted real rather than imaginary landscapes, something which would be influential on future Flemish landscape artists, including Bol.

Bol's drawings reveal his prominent role in the development of landscape art in the Low Countries. His landscapes are often populated by human figures depicting biblical or ordinary people are a combination of the two. He mixed realistic details with imaginary elements. In his approach to landscape art Bol was influenced by the work of his contemporary Pieter Bruegel the Elder. With this master he also shared his preference for depicting the seasons and the months of the year. Bruegel had revived this medieval tradition with his monumental series of the months, painted in 1565. In the following years Hans Bol made designs for a series of prints of the Four Seasons. The project was originally started by Bruegel as a project for the prominent Antwerp printer Hieronymus Cock. When Bruegel died in 1569, he had only completed the designs for Spring and Summer. That Bol was approached by Hieronymus Cock to make designs for Autumn and Winter is proof of the high esteem in which he was held by 1570. Through this commission the young Bol had effectively become the old Bruegel's successor. The whole series was engraved by the printer Pieter van der Heyden.

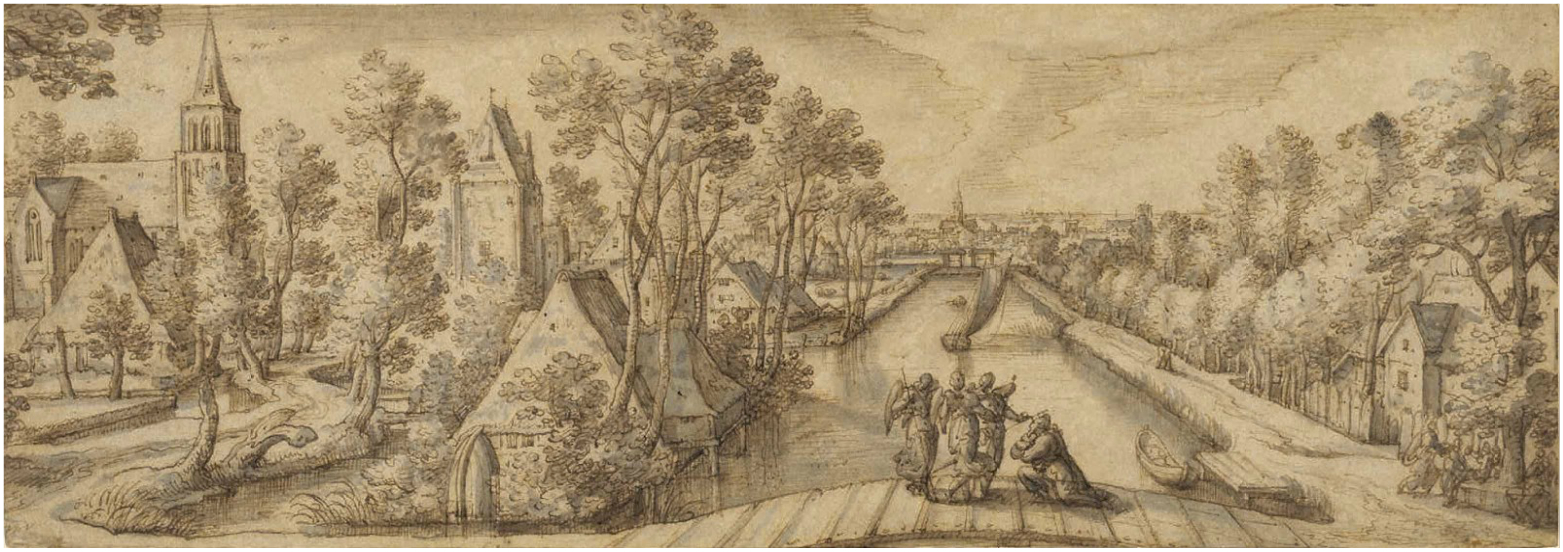
View of Delfgauw with Abraham and the Three Angels

In the following years Bol designed several more series of the Four Seasons depicting the activities characteristic of each season. A complete series of designs for the Twelve Months (but missing the design of the frontispiece) is in the collection of the Museum Boijmans Van Beuningen. It was later engraved by Adriaen Collaert and then published by the publisher Hans van Luyck in 1581. This allowed his designs to be circulated widely and to exert a great influence on contemporary artists.

Another set of drawings of the Twelve Months dated 1584-1585 was recently rediscovered and includes the design for the frontispiece for the later print publication (Auctioned at Christie's on 16 July 2014 and now in the collection of the King Baudouin Foundation in Brussels). The 13 drawings served as a design for 13 prints and both were mounted in an album. The book also contained a set of preparatory drawings for the Emblemata Evangelica: a series of prints designed by Hans Bol, engraved by Adriaen Collaert and published by Johannes Sadeler. Unlike the series of the months in the Museum Boijmans van Beuningen, which represents each month by the human labours associated with it, the drawings in the series in Brussels combine representations from the New Testament – numerous parables – and lay scenes. The scenes representing the human labours have been moved to the background, giving prominence to the religious scenes. This was a really innovative iconographic concept for the period. Some of the drawings represent several parts of a story in a single composition.

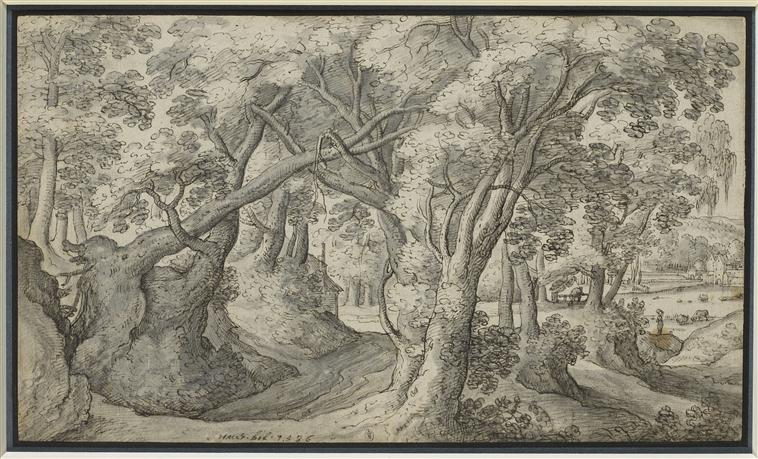
Wooded landscape with buildings along a lake

In 1582 Hans Bol and his workshop illuminated the Book of Hours of the Duke of Alençon, who was proclaimed Duke of Brabant in that year.

Hans Bol also produced a number of topographical drawings with views of various cities such as A view of Antwerp harbor (Rockox House, Antwerp). Towards the end of his life produced several drawings of wooded landscapes.
