= Gossip from the Forest (Maitland book) =

2012 book by Sara Maitland

- Author: Sara Maitland
- Subject: The connections between forests and fairytales in Northern Europe
- Published: 2012
- Publication place: UK
- ISBN: 9781847084293

Gossip from the Forest: the Tangled Roots of our Forests and Fairytales is a 2012 book by Sara Maitland about the connections between forests and fairytales in Northern Europe. It is structured around accounts of walks through 12 forests in Scotland and England, one per month of the year, and 12 associated retellings of traditional fairytales, and was published by Granta (ISBN 9781847084293).

Maitland has described the book as "a hybrid book ... history and photographs and nature and politics and science and anthropology and fiction (my own retellings of 12 Grimm stories) and, indeed, gossip."

== The chapters: the forests and the retold tales ==
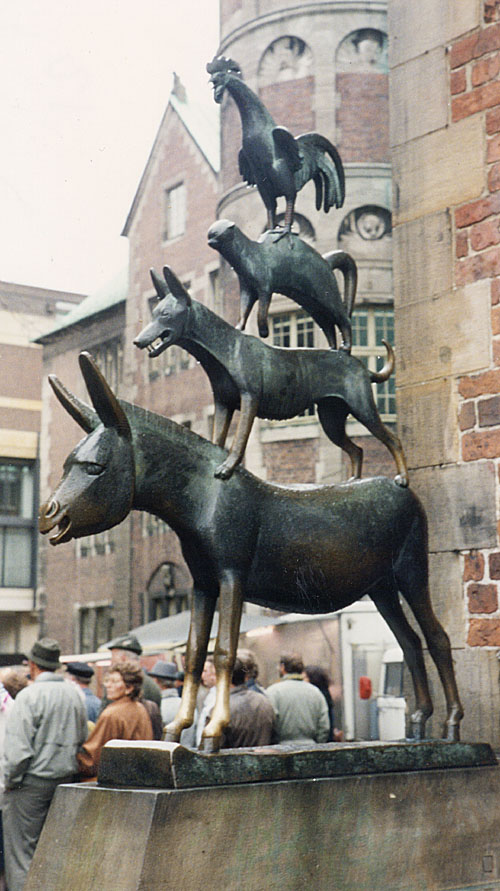
The Four Comrades / Town Musicians of Bremen, statue in Bremen

- March

- Airyolland Wood, Dumfries and Galloway
- "Thumbling"

- April

- Saltridge Wood, near Stroud, Gloucestershire
- "The White Snake"

- May

- The New Forest, Hampshire
- "Rumpelstiltskin"

- June

- Epping Forest, Greater London and Essex
- "Hansel and Gretel"

- July

- The Great North Wood, Dulwich, Sydenham and Norwood, London
- "Little Goosegirl"

- August

- Staverton Thicks (and Staverton Park), Suffolk
- "The Seven Swans' Sister" - see "The Six Swans"

- September

- Forest of Dean, Gloucestershire
- "The Seven Dwarves"

- October

- Ballochbuie, near Braemar and the Forest of Mar, Aberdeenshire
- "Rapunzel"

- November

- Kielder Forest, Northumberland
- "Little Red Riding Hood and the Big Bad Wolf"

- December

- The Purgatory Wood, near New Luce, Dumfries and Galloway
- "The Four Comrades" - see "Town Musicians of Bremen"

- January

- Glenlee: woods at this house near New Galloway, Dumfries and Galloway
- "Dancing Shoes" - see "The Twelve Dancing Princesses"

- February

- Knockman Wood, Cree Valley, Galloway Hills
- "The Dreams of the Sleeping Beauty"
