= Margaret Benson =

British author and Egyptologist (1865–1916)

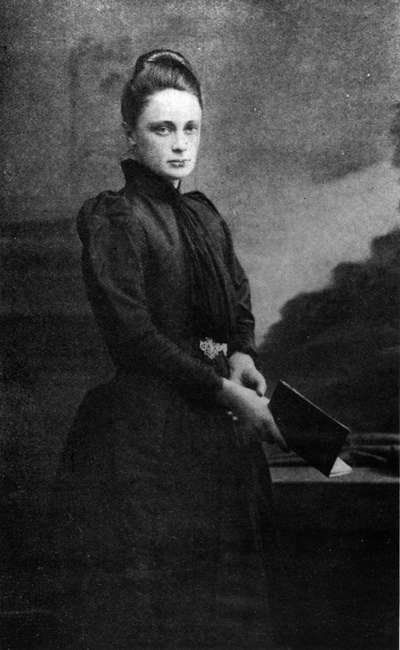
- Benson in the 1880s
- Born: 16 June 1865; Reading, Berkshire, England
- Died: 13 May 1916 (aged 50); Priory Hospital, Roehampton, London, England
- Known for: Egyptology
- Parent(s): Edward White Benson (father); Mary Benson (mother)
- Relatives: A. C. Benson (brother); Robert Hugh Benson (brother); E. F. Benson (brother); Henry Sidgwick (uncle)

Margaret Benson (16 June 1865 – 13 May 1916) was an English author and Egyptologist best known for her excavation of the Precinct of Mut, a temple compound on the east bank of the Nile.

== Early life and family ==
Margaret was born in 1865 near Reading, Berkshire, England, as one of the six children of Edward White Benson, an Anglican educator and clergyman (later Archbishop of Canterbury), and his wife Mary Sidgwick Benson, sister of philosopher Henry Sidgwick who co-founded Newnham College, a women-only college of the University of Cambridge. Margaret attended Truro Girls High School, which her father had founded while the first bishop of Truro. At the age of 18, Margaret was one of the first women to be admitted to Oxford University, where she attended the recently founded Lady Margaret Hall. Her intelligence and accomplishments were remarkable, as noted by her tutors, and John Ruskin praised her drawing and watercolour skills, inviting her to study at his school. Margaret was considered more academically successful than her more famous siblings, and in 1886, she tied for first place in England on the General Examination for Women.

Of Margaret's five siblings, her brothers included novelist Edward Frederic Benson, poet and master of Magdalene College, Cambridge, Arthur Christopher Benson, and Catholic priest and author Robert Hugh Benson. Several of the Benson family suffered from mental illnesses, with Margaret's father Edward Benson described as being prone to long periods of depression and violent mood swings. None of the Benson siblings married, and at least three of them, Arthur, Fred, and Margaret, were likely homosexual. Margaret's mother, Mary Benson, was also involved in homosexual relationships.

== Egyptology ==
Margaret first went to Egypt because of her health in 1894, where she became interested in Egyptology. In January 1895, she was the first woman to be granted a government concession to excavate in Egypt following recommendation from Edouard Naville. She excavated for three five-week seasons (1895–97) in the Temple of the Goddess Mut, Precinct of Mut, a part of Karnak, Thebes. During these seasons, she and her team worked to clear debris from the interior and to investigate the south end of the exterior.

The 1895 season had a crew of 23 men and boys. This season saw the excavations of the west half first court as well as the fixing of errors on existing maps. During this season, eight statues of Sekhmet and a block statue of Amenemhet, scribe of Amenhotep II, as well as other smaller objects such as coins, beads, and pots, were discovered.

The 1896 season saw an increased crew of between 35 and 50 men and boys. This season saw the excavation of the gateway between the first and second court, leading to the discovery that the walls of the gateway was built in four phases. In addition, the second season saw the excavation of the second court and the discovery of a statue of a lion's head, a statue of Ramesses II, and a large statue of Sekhmet.

Margaret was joined in the second season by Janet Gourlay, who became her travelling companion and partner. Together, Margaret and Janet led the first all-female excavation in Egypt.

The 1897 season saw the discovery of two statues of Mentuemhat on the first day before Margaret could arrive to the excavation site. This season saw three trenches dug for excavation, with discoveries including a statue of a sphinx, fifteen inscribed statues, pieces of clay pots, and coins dating to the time of Nero. One of the most well known figures recovered by Gourlay and Benson was the head of a figure, now in the British Museum, commonly referred to as the Benson Head.

She was unable to continue excavating following this season due to numerous health issues.

== Personal life ==
In addition to her career in archaeology and Egyptology, Margaret Benson was involved in theology and women's higher education. She was on the council of Lady Margaret Hall, the college she had attended at the age of 18, from 1902 to 1904. She also organized the St Paul's Biblical Association, part of the Oxford and Cambridge vacation terms scheme, which gave women a chance to meet and discuss the latest theological writings; this later became the archbishop's diploma in theology, which is still available. In 1904, Margaret used this association to set up a bible study lecture series, featuring speakers from the women's branch of King's College at Kensington, which had 292 subscribers in its first year. Meanwhile, between 1900 and 1904, Margaret spoke out against Christian Science and The Clarion, a socialist weekly paper. She also edited some of her father's writings and worked with her brother to write a biography for Edward White Benson, their father.

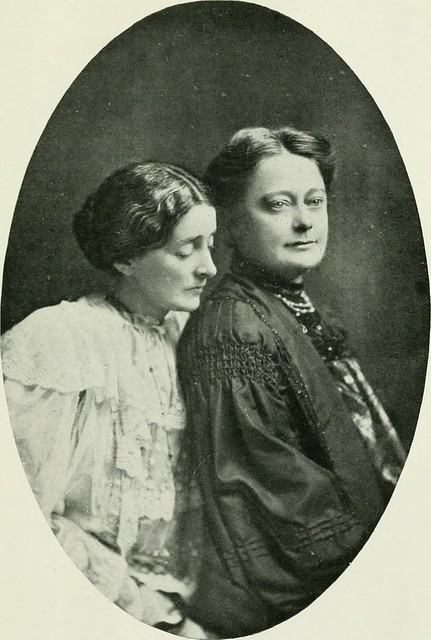
Margaret Benson and Janet Gourlay c. 1910

After meeting Janet Gourlay in 1896 during the excavations in Egypt, the two began working together. Although they are often described as 'friends', it is evident from their written communication that there was more to their relationship:

"Oh dearest, I wish I knew the Gaelic language, for I believe you are able to say all sorts of affectionate things in it which English can't express. I do want you in bodily presence very badly, my dearest."

— Margaret Benson to Janet Gourlay, 1896, Life and Letters of Maggie Benson (page 221)

While neither woman married in the legal sense, they lived together for decades, and likely perceived themselves as married.

Margaret's poor health began at the age of 20, when she contracted scarlet fever. In the next five years, she developed the symptoms of rheumatism and arthritis, which led her to seek relief in the warm climate of Egypt. Her health later led her to be unable to continue excavating after 1897. Margaret also developed pleurisy around this same time, and in 1900 she had a heart attack. She suffered a severe mental breakdown in 1907, and was treated first in an asylum at St George's Convent, Wivelsfield, Sussex, and from November 1907 to 1912, at the Priory Hospital in Roehampton. From 1907 until her death, Margaret experienced hallucinations and self-harm, as well as aggression towards her mother. According to her brother E. F. Benson, Margaret became obsessed with Lucy Tait, her mother's lover, and became convinced that Lucy was conspiring to get rid of her. E. F. Benson did not provide details in his account, but his writing suggested that she had tried to kill her mother. Margaret died of heart failure in 1916 at the age of 50.

== Publications ==
- Benson, Margaret. Capital, Labour, Trade, and the Outlook, 1891. A textbook.
- Benson, Margaret. Subject to Vanity, Methuen, 1894. "A volume of humorous and sympathetic sketches of animal life and home pets," with numerous illustrations.
- Benson, Margaret and Gourlay, Janet. The Temple of Mut in Asher: An account of the excavation of the temple and of the religious representations and objects found therein, as illustrating the history of Egypt and the main religious ideas of the Egyptians, London, John Murray, 1899
- Benson, Margaret. The Soul of a Cat, and Other Stories, Heinemann, 1901. "Stories about animals."
- Benson, Margaret. The Venture of Rational Faith, 1908. Religious philosophy.
- Benson, Margaret. The Court of the King, 1912. 'Fanciful stories'.
- A. C. Benson. Life and Letters of Maggie Benson, 1920
