= The History of Richard Raynal, Solitary =

1906 novel by Robert Hugh Benson

- Title page for The History of Richard Raynal, Solitary (1917 edition)
- Author: Robert Hugh Benson
- Language: English
- Genre: Historical novel
- Publication date: 1906
- Publication place: United Kingdom

The History of Richard Raynal, Solitary is a historical novel by Robert Hugh Benson, first published in 1906. It was republished in 1956 under the title Richard Raynal, Solitary, with an introduction by Evelyn Waugh.

== Plot ==
The novel is presented as if it had been edited from a fifteenth-century manuscript. It describes the life of Richard Raynal, an English solitary or hermit, whose quiet life is interrupted by a vision he interprets as a call from God to deliver a message to the king (seemingly Henry VI).

Although the character of Raynal is fictitious, he bears some similarity to the real English mystic Richard Rolle. Raynal travels to London to warn the king that he will face suffering and death, and as a result, the hermit is himself imprisoned in the royal palace.

== Analysis ==
In its exploration of fifteenth-century English spiritual life, the novel is particularly concerned, Waugh wrote, with "the conflicting call of solitude and contemplation with that of direct intervention—often rather drastic intervention—in the lives of others". It was Benson’s personal favourite of his books.
