= Janet Gourlay =

British egyptologist

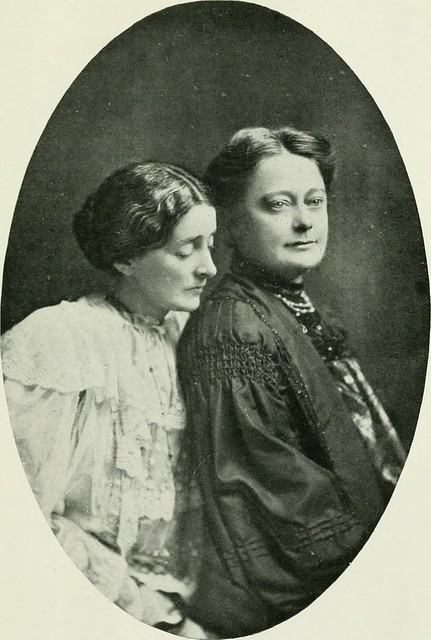
- Gourlay (left) pictured with partner, Margaret Benson (right) c. 1906
- Born: Janetta Agnes Gourlay; 30 January 1863; Dundee, Scotland
- Died: 3 March 1912 (aged 49); Kempshott Park, Hampshire, England
- Education: University College London
- Partner: Margaret Benson

Janetta "Nettie" Agnes Gourlay (1863–1912) was a Scottish Egyptologist, known for her excavation of and publication on the Precinct of Mut, a temple compound on the east bank of the Nile in Egypt. She worked with her partner Margaret Benson. Her work on the Mut Complex was from 1896 to 1897. She and Benson later returned to Thebes to work under Percy Newberry from 1900 to 1901.

== Personal life ==
Janet Gourlay was born on 30 January 1863 in Dundee, Scotland, the eldest daughter of engineer Henry G. Gourlay and Agnes Christie Burrell, who had married in 1861.

She was known to have a disabling illness that was noticed and sometimes remarked on. She was extremely shy and soft-spoken.

Gourlay visited Egypt with her family on a Thomas Cook Cruise in 1890.

She met her lifelong partner Margaret Benson in Egypt in 1896 during the second excavation of the Mut Complex. They were introduced by their mutual friend Lady Jane Lindsay. In conjunction with their romantic relationship, they formed a scientific partnership which allowed the highly educated women to travel and work without needing a man on site to oversee their work. During the off seasons, they would meet up in places such as London.

Upon completion of their excavations, Benson's health began deteriorating, so the two returned to their respective homes. They kept in close contact via letters. In these, they described their devotion, emotions, and happenings. Benson's health never made a recovery, which stopped the two from returning to Egypt for more excavations. Their relationship may have calmed with distance, but they still exchanged letters until Gourlay's death.

On 3 March 1912, Gourlay died in Kempshott Park near Basingstoke. She never married.

== Professional life ==
Gourlay studied at University College, London in 1893, supervised by Flinders Petrie and Margaret Murray, gaining excavation experience to add to her theoretical knowledge.

Gourlay joined Benson in 1896 in the second season of excavation at the Precinct of Mut in Karnak, Thebes, in Egypt. The pair stayed at the Luxor Hotel for the duration of these digging seasons. However, after her first season, Gourlay arranged for a more private housing with Benson, whose construction in Gurna was overseen by fellow Egyptologist Percy Newberry. She pushed for requests like an open doorway between the pair's bedrooms.

Gourlay and Newberry published a journal article describing the excavation of Mentu-Em-Hat in 1898. They also published an incomplete account in 1899. It was published this way so that the information could be available to others and it would not be forgotten, as it previously had been, which they explained in their preface. Gourlay and Benson were the first women to undertake an excavation of this nature, and this is also acknowledged in their preface, with the following: "we have to thank M. de Morgan's liberality for the first permission to excavate given to women in Egypt".

== Excavations ==
Benson's excavation of the Mut Complex originally began on January 1, 1895.

Gourlay joined Benson in 1896. Since Gourlay was university educated, she handled most of the correspondence with Newberry, one of the main heads of the expedition. When they started the excavation, they were denied the ability to clear the site, but when M. Naville explained their situation, they were given permission. Their excavation went on to span two digging seasons, resulting in three digging seasons total for the Mut Complex.

The two women restored and uncovered various pieces of sculptures, heads, figures, and architecture. Notable statuary includes the head of Amun (or Amun-re), the head of Ramesses III, a statue of Ramesses II, the figure of priest Sur, Senenmut, and Bak-en-Khonsu, a statue of Tutankhamun sitting and various other figures. One of the most well-known pieces recovered by Gourlay and Benson was the head of a figure, commonly referred to as the Benson Head.

During the excavation, the women focused mainly on finding artifacts, and did not focus on mapping the site as much as other Egyptologists. After identifying the items, the pair made an effort to account for religious representations associated with the pieces. Many of these pieces were then sent to museums in Britain or Cairo, or added to their personal collections.

During the excavation, they worked with many people, ranging from 16 to over 80 boys, and from 4 to 17 men. They took into consideration the religious practices of Ramadan for their workers, even letting them leave an hour early. The women worried less than their contemporaries about stealing, because the statues they worked with were so large.

In the second season, the pair was able to afford more help, as Gourlay's father gave them extra funding; they also had an anonymous donor. The excavation went until 1897, due to Benson suffering from non-fatal cases of pleurisy and heart attack.

Gourlay returned to Egypt on December 13, 1900, with Benson, to work on restoring a cleared tomb in Thebes. Some of their work involved documenting wall art in the tomb. Some of their work was directly overseen by the excavation's patrons Emma Andrews and Theodore M. Davis. They left in 1901 at the end of the season. This would be Gourlay's last trip to Egypt.

== Publications ==
- Benson, Margaret and Gourlay, Janet. The Temple of Mut in Asher: An account of the excavation of the temple and of the religious representations and objects found therein, as illustrating the history of Egypt and the main religious ideas of the Egyptians, London, John Murray, 1899
- Gourlay, J. A. with Percy Newberry, "Mentu-em-hat," Recueil de travaux relatifs à la philologie et à l'archéologie égyptiennes et assyriennes: pour servir de bulletin à la Mission Française du Caire, 20:3-4 (1898), 188-192.

== See also ==
- Gourlay Brothers
- Molly Gourlay
