= Edward White Benson =

Archbishop of Canterbury (1829–1896)

The Most Reverend and Right Honourable Edward White Benson
- Archbishop of Canterbury
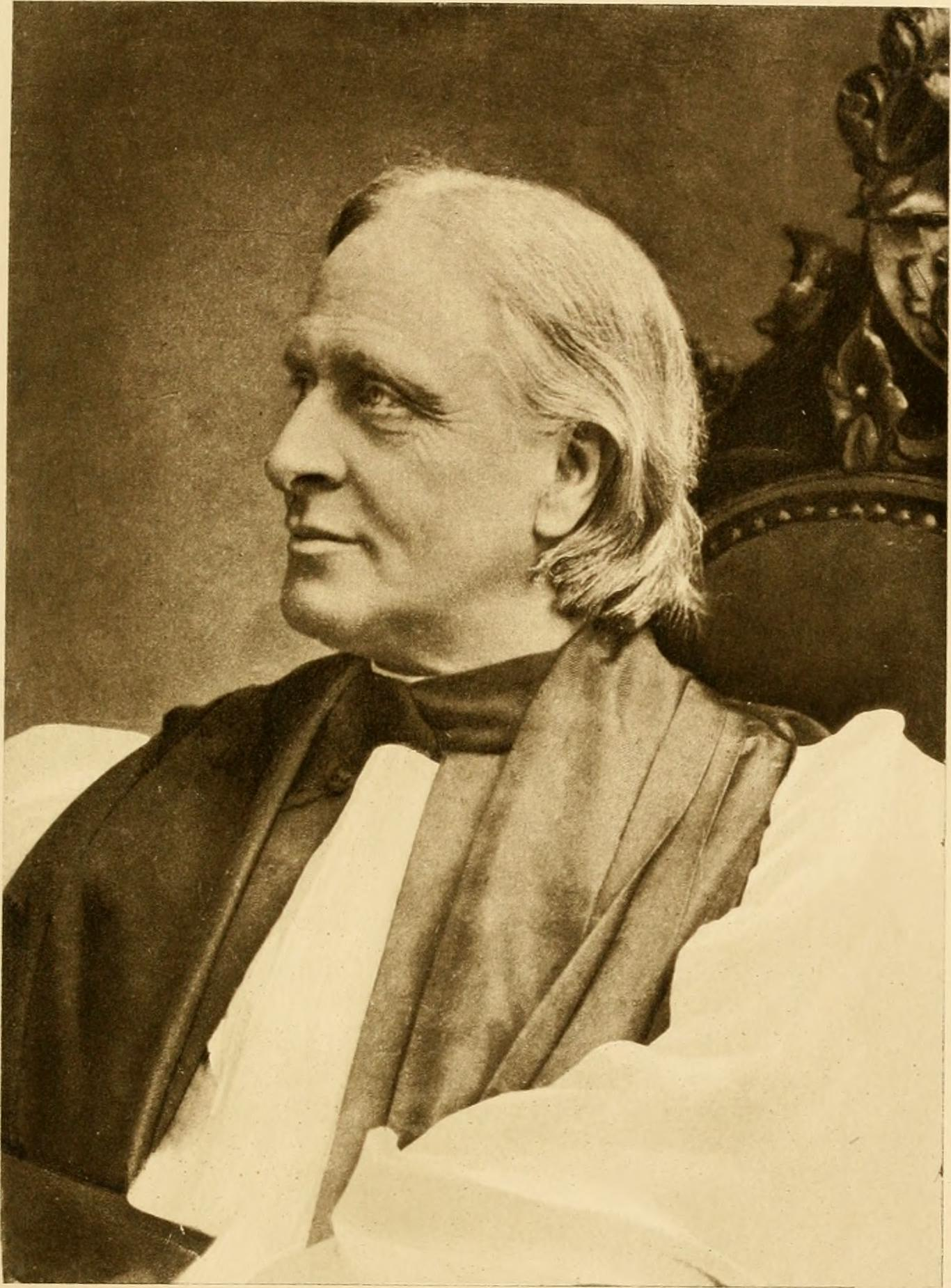
- Archbishop Benson, c. 1890s
- Church: Church of England
- Diocese: Canterbury
- Appointed: 21 December 1882
- Installed: 29 March 1883
- Term ended: 11 October 1896
- Predecessor: Archibald Campbell Tait
- Successor: Frederick Temple
- Previous post: Bishop of Truro (1877–1883)

Orders
- Ordination: 1853 (as deacon) by James Prince Lee; 1857 (as priest) by Thomas Turton
- Consecration: 25 April 1877 by Archibald Campbell Tait

Personal details
- Born: Edward White Benson; 14 July 1829 Birmingham, Warwickshire, England
- Died: 11 October 1896 (aged 67) Hawarden, Flintshire, Wales
- Buried: Canterbury Cathedral
- Denomination: Anglican
- Spouse: Mary (Minnie) Sidgwick
- Children: 6, including: A. C. Benson; Robert Hugh Benson; E. F. Benson; Margaret Benson
- Education: Trinity College, Cambridge

Edward White Benson (14 July 1829 – 11 October 1896) was archbishop of Canterbury from 1883 until his death. Before this, he was the first Bishop of Truro, serving from 1877 to 1883, and began construction of Truro Cathedral.

He was previously a schoolmaster and was the first Master of Wellington College from 1859 to 1872.

== Life ==
Edward White Benson was born at Lombard Street in Highgate, Birmingham, on 14 July 1829, the eldest of eight children of Edward White Benson (26 August 1802 – 7 February 1843), a chemical manufacturer, and Harriet Baker (13 June 1805 – 29 May 1850). He was baptised in St Martin in the Bull Ring, Birmingham, on 31 March 1830. The family moved to Wychbold when his father became manager of the British Alkali Works at Stoke Prior, Worcestershire.

From 1840, he was educated at King Edward's School, Birmingham and then Trinity College, Cambridge, where he graduated BA (8th in the Classical tripos) in 1852. At King Edward's, under James Prince Lee, Benson "manifested a deeply religious tone of mind and was fond of sermons".

=== Cambridge Ghost Society ===
The Cambridge Association for Spiritual Inquiry, known informally as the Cambridge Ghost Society or the Ghostlie Guild, was founded by Benson and Brooke Foss Westcott in 1851 at Trinity College. Westcott worked as its secretary until 1860. The society collected and investigated reports of ghosts. Other notable members included Alfred Barry and Henry Sidgwick. It has been described as a predecessor of the Society for Psychical Research. According to the Notebooks of Henry James, his source for the novella The Turn of the Screw was the Archbishop of Canterbury (i.e. Benson) at Addington Palace on 10 January 1895.

=== Schoolmaster at Rugby and Wellington ===
Benson began his career as a schoolmaster at Rugby School in 1852, and was ordained deacon in 1853 and priest in 1857. In 1859 Benson was chosen by Prince Albert as the first Master of Wellington College, Berkshire, which had recently been built as the nation's memorial to the Duke of Wellington. Benson was largely responsible for establishing Wellington as a leading public school, closely modelled upon Rugby School.

=== Lincoln and Truro ===
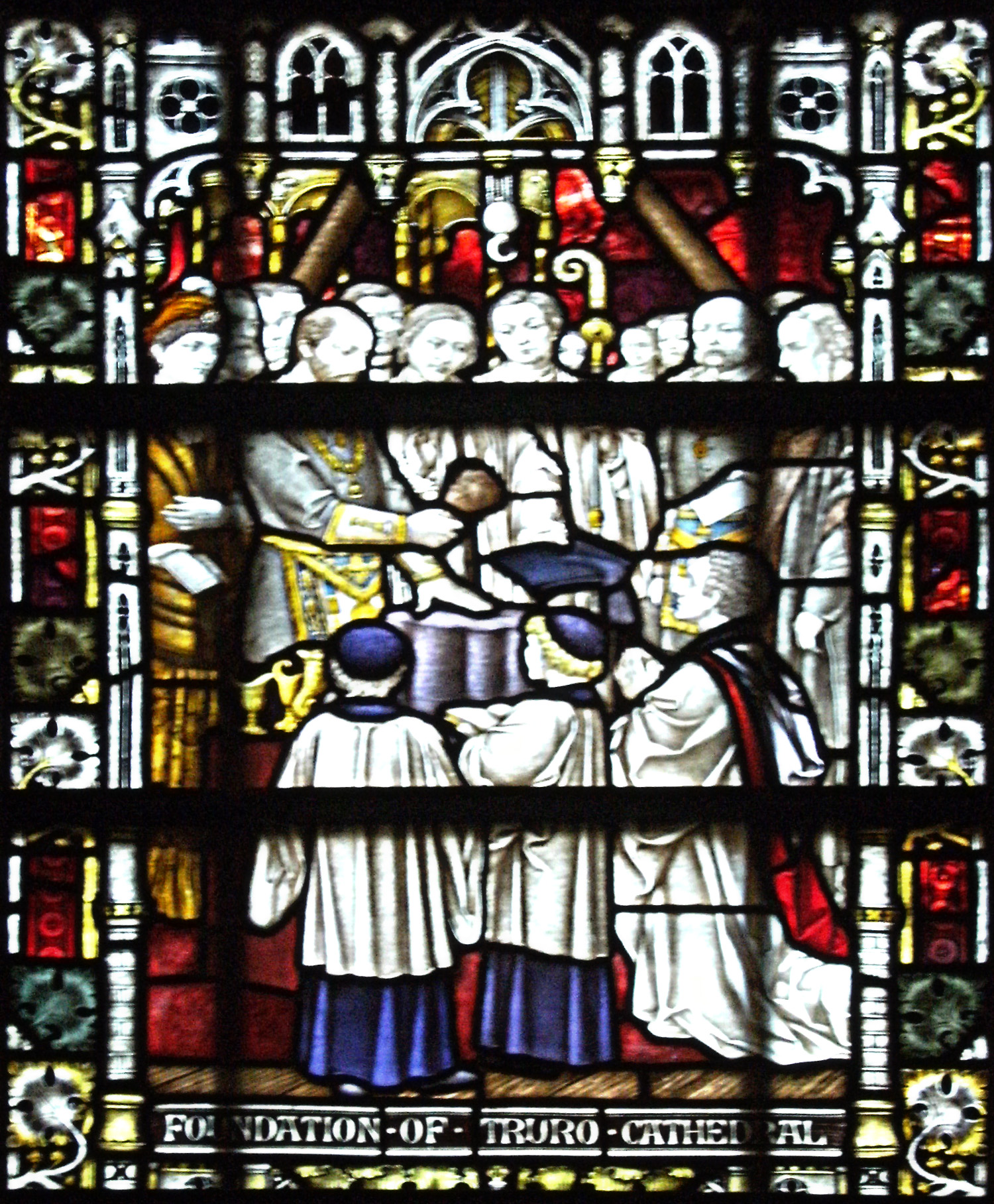
A stained glass window depicting the foundation of Truro Cathedral

From 1872 to 1877, he was Chancellor of Lincoln Cathedral. In 1874, he set up Lincoln Theological College.

He was appointed the first Bishop of Truro, where he served from 1877 to 1882. He was consecrated bishop by Archibald Campbell Tait, Archbishop of Canterbury, on St Mark's day, 25 April 1877 at St Paul's Cathedral. The Diocese of Truro was established in December 1876. Construction of Truro Cathedral began in 1880 to a design by the Gothic Revival architect John Loughborough Pearson. From 24 October 1880 until 1887 a temporary wooden building on an adjacent site served as the cathedral. As archbishop, Benson consecrated the cathedral on 3 November 1887.

He founded Truro High School for Girls in 1880.

=== Archbishop of Canterbury, 1883–1896 ===
Archbishop Benson

In 1883 he was appointed Archbishop of Canterbury.

Five years later Benson avoided Edward King, Bishop of Lincoln, being prosecuted before a lay tribunal under the Public Worship Regulation Act 1874 for six ritual offences by hearing the case in his own archiepiscopal court (inactive since 1699). In his judgement (often called "the Lincoln Judgement"), he found against the bishop on two points, with a proviso as to a third that when performing the manual acts during the prayer of consecration in the Holy Communion service, the priest must stand in a way that is visible to the people.

Benson tried to amalgamate the two Convocations and the new houses of laity into a single assembly. In 1896 it was established that they could 'unofficially' meet together.

In September of the same year, the papal bull Apostolicae curae, which denied the validity of Anglican orders, was published and Benson had started a reply. He preached his last sermon at St Patrick's Cathedral, Armagh on 27 September: there is a memorial to him in the north aisle there. He was taken ill while attending Sunday service in St Deiniol's Church, Hawarden, Wales, on 11 October 1896, during a visit to the former Prime Minister, William Ewart Gladstone. His death was attributed to heart failure. Three days later his body was put on the train at Sandycroft station to be returned to London.

He was buried at Canterbury Cathedral, in a magnificent tomb located at the western end of the nave. The tomb is emblazoned with the epitaph Benson had chosen: Miserere mei Deus Per crucem et passionem tuam libera me Christe ("Have mercy on me O Christ our God, Through Thy Cross and Passion, deliver thou me").

His work concerning Saint Cyprian, Cyprian: his life, his times, his work, was published posthumously, in the year after his death.

== Legacy ==
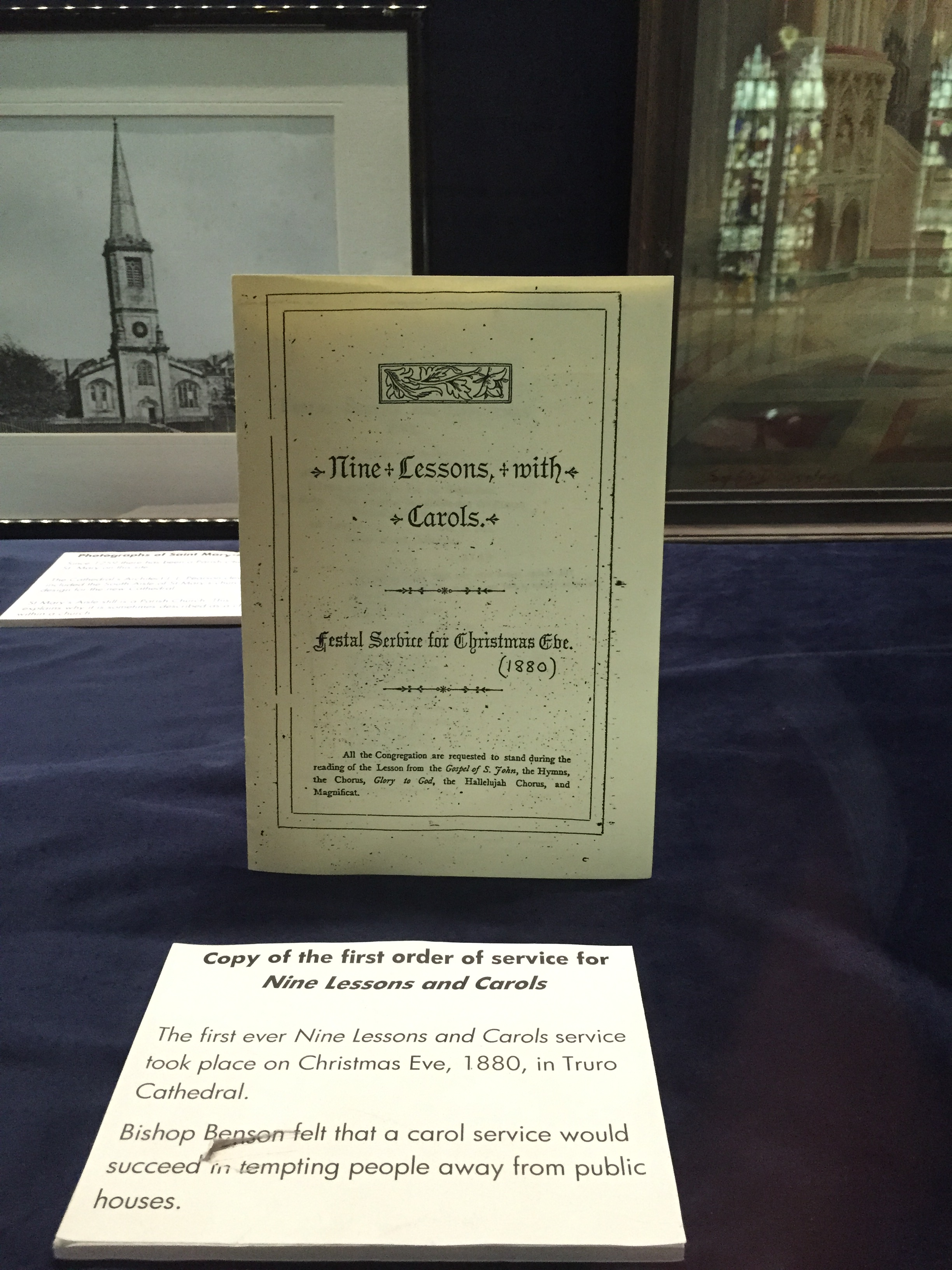
Order of Service for the first Nine Lessons and Carols in 1880 on display in Truro Cathedral

Benson is best remembered for devising the Festival of Nine Lessons and Carols, an order first used in Truro Cathedral on Christmas Eve, 1880. Considerably revised by Eric Milner-White for King's College, Cambridge, this service is now broadcast every Christmas around the world.

Benson was the founder of the Church of England Purity Society, an organisation which later merged with the White Cross Army. Alfred Ryder served as a trustee of the organisation.

Benson told Henry James a simple, rather inexpert story he had heard about the ghosts of evil servants who tried to lure young children to their deaths. James recorded the idea in his Notebooks and eventually used it as the starting-point for his classic ghost story, The Turn of the Screw.

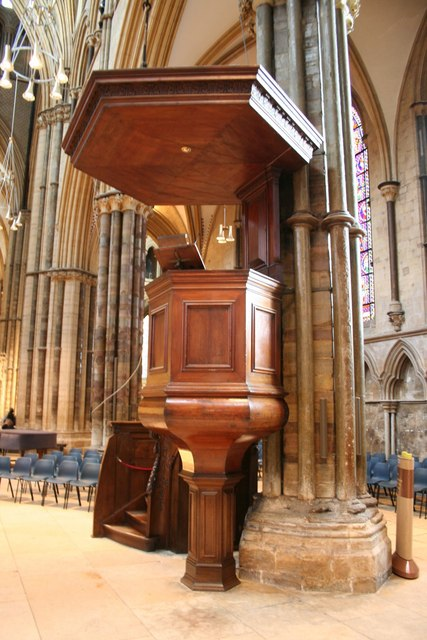
Pulpit in Lincoln Cathedral commemorating Archbishop Benson

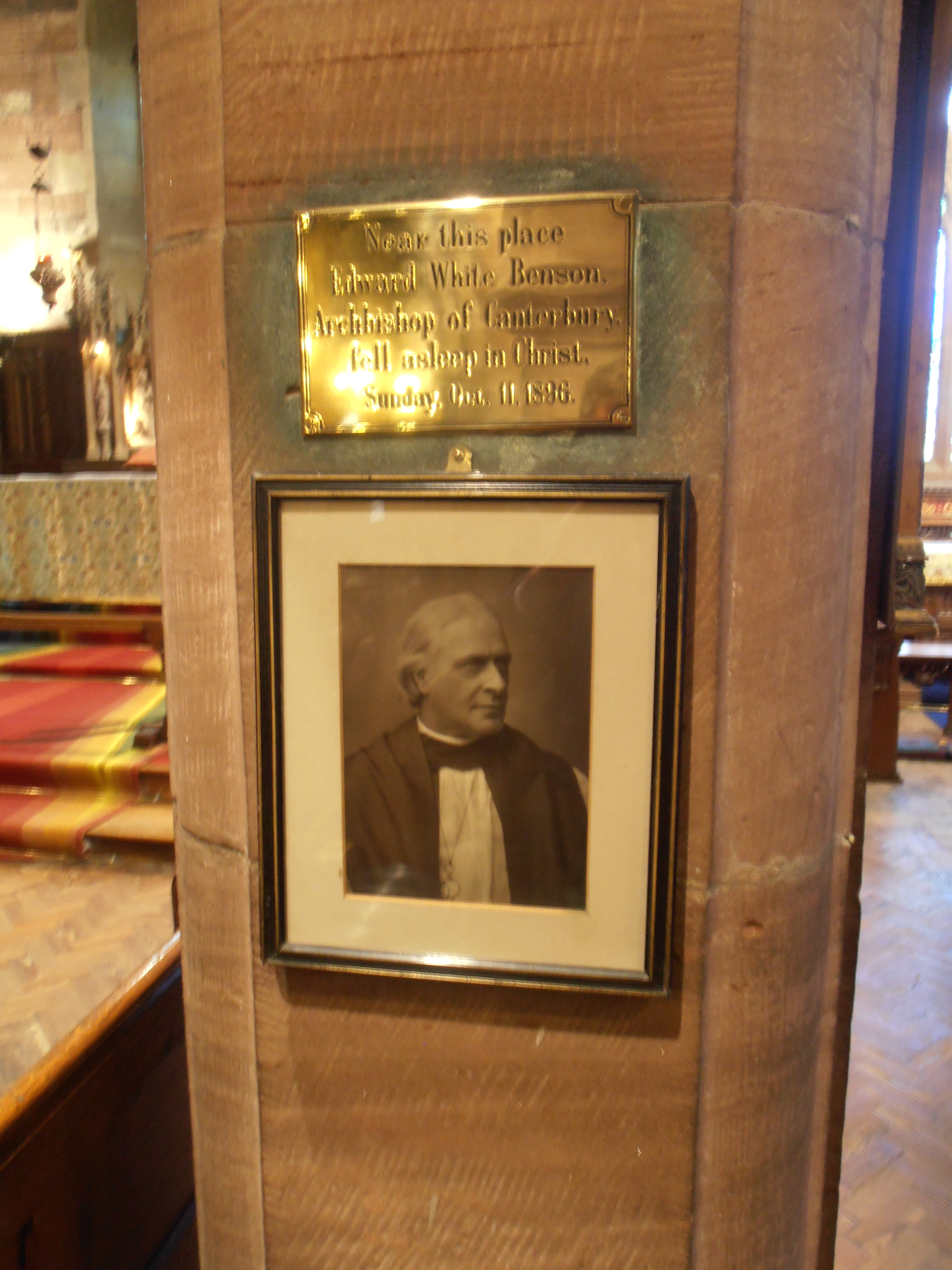
Memorial to Benson in Hawarden Church

The hymn "God Is Working His Purpose Out" was written by Arthur C. Ainger as a tribute to Benson as both were Masters at Eton and Rugby respectively.

In 1914, a boarding house at Wellington College was named in his honour. Benson House carries the emblem of a blue Tudor Rose, and is situated in its own corner of the college grounds.

== Personal life ==
Benson married his second cousin Mary (Minnie) Sidgwick, the sister of philosopher Henry, when she was 18, having proposed to her when she was 12 and he was 24. The couple had six children. Benson also supervised the education of his younger sister Ada Benson who was left an orphan in 1852.

Their fifth child was the novelist Edward Frederic Benson, best remembered for his Mapp and Lucia novels. Another son was Arthur Christopher Benson, the author of the lyrics to Elgar's "Land of Hope and Glory" and master of Magdalene College, Cambridge. Their sixth and youngest child, Robert Hugh Benson, became a priest in the Church of England before converting to Catholicism and writing many popular novels. Their daughter, Margaret Benson, was an artist, author and Egyptologist. None of the children married; and some appeared to suffer from mental illnesses, possibly bipolar disorder.

After the archbishop's death, his widow set up household with Lucy Tait, daughter of the previous archbishop of Canterbury, Archibald Campbell Tait. A biography of Mary Benson, using her numerous letters, was published in 2011. It characterised her husband as living "a life of relentless success".

Edward Benson's aunt, his father's maternal half-sister, was the botanical illustrator Mary Ann Jackson.

== Ancestry ==
The Benson family was of Scandinavian origin with the name of Bjornsen. The Bensons "emerge into history" as an English family in 1348 when John Benson held a "toft" from the Abbey at Swinton-by-Masham in Yorkshire.

Arthur Christopher Benson, the archbishop's son, wrote a genealogy of his family. He found that "Old" Christopher Benson (born 1703) was the "real founder of the fortunes" of the Benson family having acquired a "good deal" of land. He also "established a large business."

Escutcheon of Edward White Benson

Archbishop Edward White Benson's grandfather was Captain White Benson, of the 6th Regiment of Foot. The archbishop's seal and the Captain's coat of arms show their branch of the Benson family arms were blazoned: Argent, a quatrefoil between two trefoils slipped in bend sable, between four bendlets gules.

The archbishop's father was Edward White Benson (born in York in 1802, died at Birmingham Heath in 1843). He was a Fellow of the Royal Botanical Society of Edinburgh and the author of books on education and religion. He was also an inventor whose inventions made "considerable fortunes" for others, but not for him.

== Works ==
- Boy-life, Its Trial, Its Strength, Its Fulness: Sundays in Wellington College, 1859–1873. London: Macmillan & Co. 1883.
- The Seven Gifts. London: Macmillan & Co. 1885.
- Christ and His Times: Addressed to the Diocese of Canterbury in His Second Visitation. London: Macmillan & Co. 1889. ISBN 9780428991159.
- Living Theology. London: Sampson Low, Marston & Company. 1893.
- Cyprian: His Life, His Times, His Work. London: Macmillan & Co. 1897.
- Bernard, J. H., ed. (1896). Archbishop Benson in Ireland: A Record of His Irish Sermons and Addresses 1896. London: Macmillan & Co.
- The Apocalypse,: An introductory Study of the Revelation of St. John the Divine. London: Macmillan & Co. 1900.

== Sources ==
- Benson, A. C. (1900a). The Life of Edward White Benson, Sometime Archbishop of Canterbury. Vol. I. London: Macmillan.
- Benson, A. C. (1900b). The Life of Edward White Benson, Sometime Archbishop of Canterbury. Vol. II. London: Macmillan.
- "Benson, Edward White". New American Supplement to the New Werner Edition of The Encyclopædia Britannica. Vol. I. Werner Co. 1903. p. 422.
- Benson, Arthur Christopher (1894). Genealogy of the Family of Benson of Banger House and Northwoods, in the Parish of Ripon and Chapelry of Pateley Bridge. Eton: George New.
- Bolt, Rodney (2011). As Good as God, as Clever as the Devil: The Impossible Life of Mary Benson. Reprinted in paperback as The Impossible Life of Mary Benson: The Extraordinary Story of a Victorian Wife. 2012.
- Carr, James Anderson (1898). Life-work of Edward White Benson, D.D.: Sometime Archbishop of Canterbury. Elliot Stock.
- Chisholm, Hugh, ed. (1911). "Benson, Edward White" . Encyclopædia Britannica. Vol. 3 (11th ed.). Cambridge University Press.
- Mason, Arthur James (1901). "Benson, Edward White" . In Lee, Sidney (ed.). Dictionary of National Biography (1st supplement). London: Smith, Elder & Co.
- Prettejohn, Elizabeth (1999). After the Pre-Raphaelites. Manchester University Press. ISBN 0-7190-5406-0.

Church of England titles
New diocese	Bishop of Truro; 1877–1883	Succeeded by George Wilkinson
Preceded by Archibald Campbell Tait	Archbishop of Canterbury; 1883–1896	Succeeded by Frederick Temple
