= Mary Benson (hostess) =

English society hostess (1841–1918)

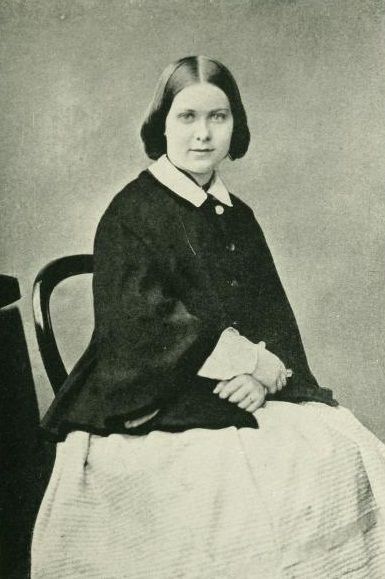
- Mary Benson at 20.
- Born: Mary Sidgwick; 16 March 1841; Skipton, Yorkshire, England
- Died: 15 June 1918 (aged 77); East Sussex, England
- Spouse: Edward White Benson
- Children: 6, including: A. C. Benson; Robert Hugh Benson; E. F. Benson; Margaret Benson
- Relatives: Henry Sidgwick (brother)

Mary Benson (née Sidgwick; 16 March 1841 – 15 June 1918) was an English hostess of the Victorian era. She was the wife of Edward Benson, who during their marriage became Archbishop of Canterbury. Their children included several prolific authors and contributors to cultural life. During her marriage, she was involved with Lucy Tait (11 February 1856 – 5 December 1938), daughter of the previous Archbishop of Canterbury. She was described by William Gladstone, the British Prime Minister, as the 'cleverest woman in Europe'.

== Life ==
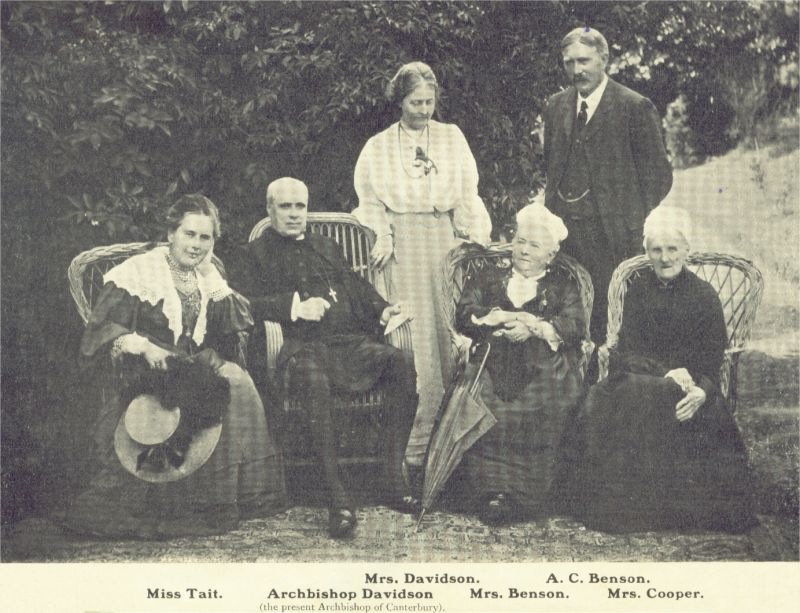
Miss Tait, Archbishop Davidson (Archbishop of Canterbury), Mrs. Davidson, Mrs. Benson, A.C. Benson, Mrs. Cooper, 1911

Mary Sidgwick was born in Britain in 1841, at Skipton, Yorkshire, the only daughter of Rev. William Sidgwick of Skipton, Yorkshire, who was a headmaster, and his wife, Mary (née Crofts), whose parents were the Rev. William Crofts, B.D., vicar of North Grimston, and Miss Carr of Bolton Abbey, who were married at York in 1804. (Note: Mary Crofts nephew was Ernest Crofts) She was the youngest of six children, and was nicknamed Minnie. Among her older brothers was the philosopher Henry Sidgwick.

When she was 18, she married her second cousin Edward White Benson. Edward had proposed to Mary when she was 12 and he was 24. They were married on 23 June 1859 at Rugby, Warwickshire, by Frederick Temple.

Between 1860 and 1871 they had six children. Their daughter, Margaret Benson was an artist, author and amateur Egyptologist. Mary Eleanor "Nellie" Benson was a social worker and writer. Their second son was A. C. Benson, the author of the lyrics to Elgar's "Land of Hope and Glory" and master of Magdalene College, Cambridge. Their fifth child was novelist E. F. Benson, best remembered for the Mapp and Lucia novels. Their sixth and youngest child, Robert Hugh Benson, became a priest in the Church of England before converting to Roman Catholicism and writing many popular novels.

After her husband's death in 1896 Mary set up household with Lucy Tait, daughter of the previous archbishop of Canterbury, Archibald Campbell Tait, who had first moved in with the Bensons in 1889.

She died on 15 June 1918 in East Sussex. Tait and Benson are buried at St Mary's Church, Addington, Surrey, with their respective families.

== Children ==
Mary, with her husband Edward, had six children.

1. Martin White Benson – A prodigy who raised high hopes with his academic excellence, but died from meningitis at the age of 17.
2. Arthur Christopher Benson – An academic at Cambridge University, author of popular books in his time, and now remembered for his lyrics to Elgar's "Land of Hope and Glory".
3. Margaret Benson (Maggie) – An amateur Egyptologist who was committed to a psychiatric institution in her later life, following a now unclear incident involving her mother and possibly Lucy Tait.
4. Edward Frederic Benson – a socialiser in London's high society and author of much popular fiction, including "Mapp and Lucia".
5. Mary Eleanor 'Nellie' Benson – social worker. Died of diphtheria at the age of 27.
6. Robert Hugh Benson – Church of England priest, converted to Roman Catholicism and author of popular religious and supernatural novels centred on apologetic themes of his religion.

There were no grandchildren.

== Ancestry ==
Ancestors of Mary Sidgwick

8.
4.
9.
2. Rev. William Sidgwick
10.
5.
11.
1. Mary Sidgwick
12.
6. Rev. William Crofts
13.
3. Mary Crofts
14. Thomas Carr, A.M.
7. Miss Carr
15.
