= Precinct of Mut =

Ancient Egyptian temple compound

Coordinates: 25°42′43″N 32°39′20″E

Map of Precinct of Mut Complex (lower portion)

The Precinct of Mut is an Ancient Egyptian temple compound located in the present city of Luxor (ancient Thebes), on the east bank of the Nile in South Karnak. The compound is one of the four key ancient temples that creates the Karnak Temple Complex. It is approximately 325 m (355 yd) south of the precinct of the god Amun. The precinct itself encompasses approximately 9 ha (22 acres) of the entire area. The Mut Precinct contains at least six temples: the Mut Temple, the Contra Temple, and Temples A, B, C, and D. Surrounding the Mut Temple proper, on three sides, is a sacred lake called the Isheru. To the south of the sacred lake is a vast amount of land currently being excavated by Dr. Violaine Chauvet.

Today, most of the compound is still destroyed, but it is currently being renovated. Surrounding the Mut Temple, the Contra Temple, and Temples A, B, C, and D, is an enclosure wall made of mud brick dating to the 30th Dynasty. The Mut Temple proper was made of mediocre sandstone and it is positioned north and south and is directly aligned with the Precinct of Amun. The Contra Temple, also made of mediocre sandstone, borders the Mut Temple at the south end of it, hence the name, and it possibly dates to the 30th Dynasty with certain alternations made during the Ptolemaic period. The purpose of the Contra Temple is still unclear, however, Fazzini states that it possibly served as a stopping point in a partially columned passage around the Mut Temple. In the northeast corner is the structure known as Temple A and according to Brooklyn Museum's exhibition on the Precinct of Mut, it was also called the "Temple of Millions of Years" and was dedicated to Ramsses II and the god Amun-Ra. Within the temple are two stelae, one referring to Ramsses II's work on Temple A and the other telling of his marriage to Hittite princess. The Brooklyn Museum states that Temple A did not become a part of the Mut Precinct until the 25th Dynasty under the reign of the Kushite king, Taharqa and during which time it became a birthing house, "mammisi", where Ancient Egyptians would celebrate the birth of the god Khonsu, the son of Amun-Ra and Mut.

To the east of the Mut Temple is a ruined building referred to as, Temple B, due to the amount of damage of Temple B, excavations are difficult to undergo. To the west of the sacred lake, Isheru, lies Temple C, a small temple built by Ramsses III, it still retains some military scenes on the outer walls, as well as two headless giants of the king himself before the entrance of the temple. Temple D, or Structure D, was a chapel made during the Ptolemaic period, the front room was dedicated to the goddess Mut and the back room shows evidence of being dedicated to a Ptolemaic ancestor cult. The Brooklyn Museum mentions one other important monument found on the site is the Taharqa gateway that is about 7 yards wide and is oriented south and west, it was built to enlarge the Mut Precinct and opened a new pathway to Temple A. The sacred lake, Isheru, was man made and held religious importance to the cult of the goddess Mut.

== The goddess Mut ==
The goddess Mut is the wife and consort of the god Amun-Ra. She was also known as the Mother Goddess, Queen of the Goddesses, and Lady of Heaven. Mut was the Egyptian sky goddess and her symbols were the vulture, lioness and the crown of Uraeus (rearing cobra). She was the mother of Khonsu, the god of the moon. Amun-Ra, Mut, and Khonsu made up the Theban Triad.

== Who built the Mut Precinct? ==
Amenhotep III was originally thought to have been the first to build the Mut Temple, but now evidence tells us he contributed later to the site. The earliest dated cartouches are of Thutmose II and III of the 18th Dynasty (some evidence suggest that Thutmose's name is likely a replacement for Hatshepsut's erased name). According to Elizabeth Waraksa, during the 19th Dynasty, Ramsses II worked broadly on Temple A, he placed two massive statues of himself and two alabaster stelae in the front of the temple's first pylon. During the 20th Dynasty, Ramsses III built Temple C, it was used until the 25th Dynasty when it then became a quarry for renovations for Temple A. During his reign, Kushite ruler Taharqa in the 25th Dynasty made major changes to the Mut Precinct. He built a new sandstone gateway in the northwest of the site that leads to Temple A. He also renovated parts of the Mut Temple proper, erecting a columned porch facing the south. Ptolemy VI during the Ptolemaic period erected a small chapel inside the Mut Temple proper. Several stelae found on the site, mention construction on the site by Roman emperors Augustus and Tiberius from the 1st century BC to the 1st century AD.

== Excavations ==
Many travelers, like Napoleon and Sir John Gardiner Wilkinson visited the Precinct of Mut between AD 1799 and 1845. The photographs, journals and maps that dated to the early excavations have added insight as to how the Mut Precinct could have looked at the time of each exploration. However, the first major excavation of the site did not occur until 1895, when Britons Margaret Benson and Janet Gourlay excavated the Precinct of Mut for three seasons (1895–7). During her excavations Benson cleared the First and Second courts, as well as the Contra Temple and uncovered many high quality pieces of statues. In 1899, she publicized her work, The Temple of Mut in Asher. Excavations were not continued until the 1920s, when Maurice Pillet resumed excavating the Mut Precinct. During his excavations he restored Temples A and C. Later in 1976, Richard A. Fazzini and the Brooklyn Museum of Art, with assistance from the Detroit Institute of Arts, did an efficient investigation of the entire Mut Precinct up until 2001. Starting in January 2001, Bryan, in association with Johns Hopkins University, began working on the site until 2004. In the winter of 2015, Bryan went to work on excavating the site again.

== Statues of Sekhmet ==
The site is notable for the statues of the lion-headed goddess Sekhmet found there. The statues are made of diorite or "black granite" and initially approximately 570 granodiorite statues were thought to have been at the Precinct of Mut at one time. According to Lythgoe, Amenhotep III, commissioned the many statues to be built as a "forest". Amenhotep III described Sekhmet as the terrible, mighty goddess of war and strife and her origins came from the earlier Memphite triad as the mother-goddess, and she eventually became recognized with the local Theban deity, Mut. According to Porter and Moss (1960), most of the statues came from the actual site, but some possibly came from the Mortuary Temple of Amenhotep III on the west bank of the Nile. Today the statues can be found in various museums across the globe; in Boston, the Museum of Fine Arts has one seated statue, the Egyptian Museum, Cairo has six statues, and in London, the British Museum has thirty statues, just to name a few examples.

Statues of Sekhmet from Karnak on display in various museums
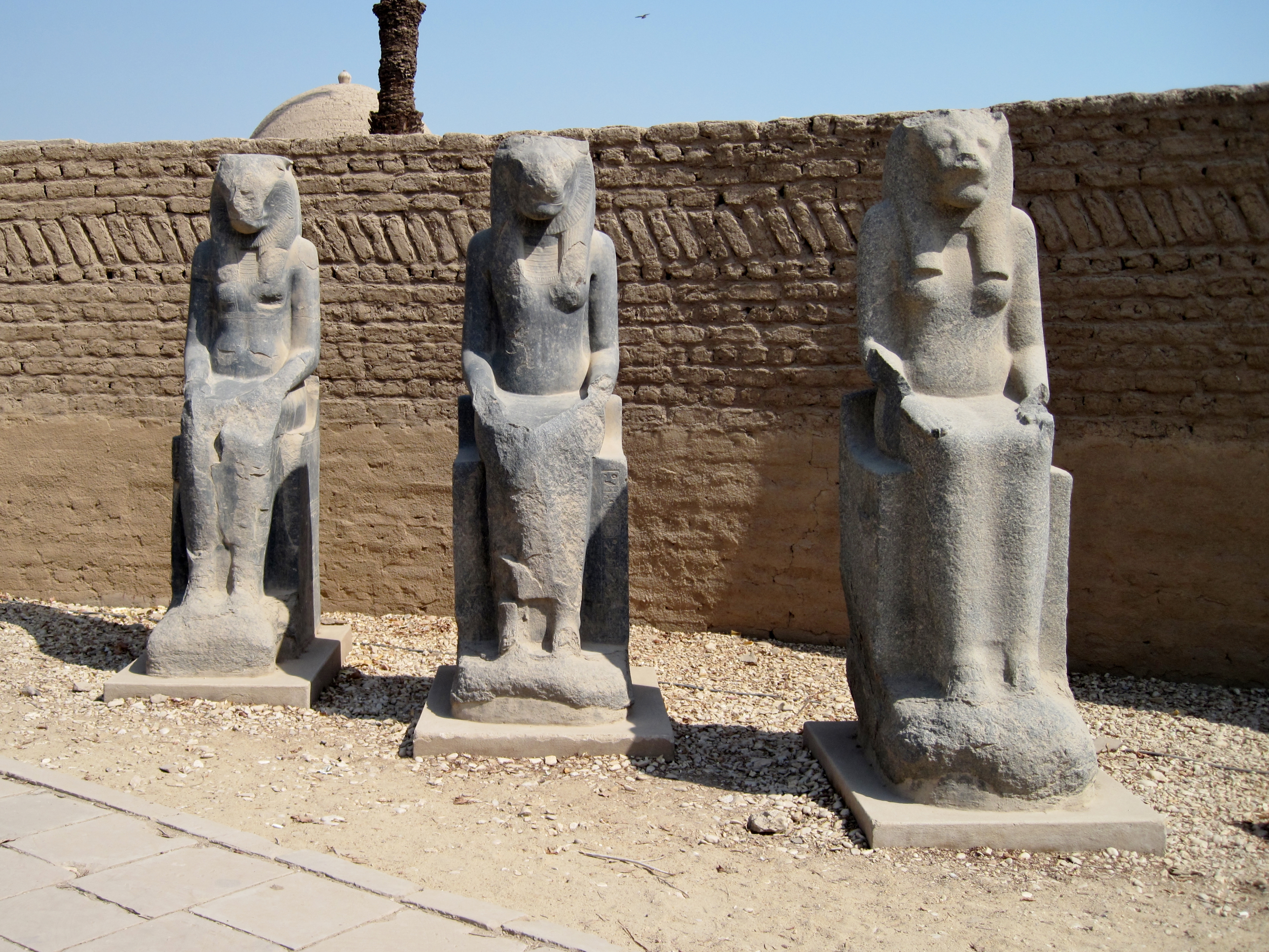
In situ at Karnak

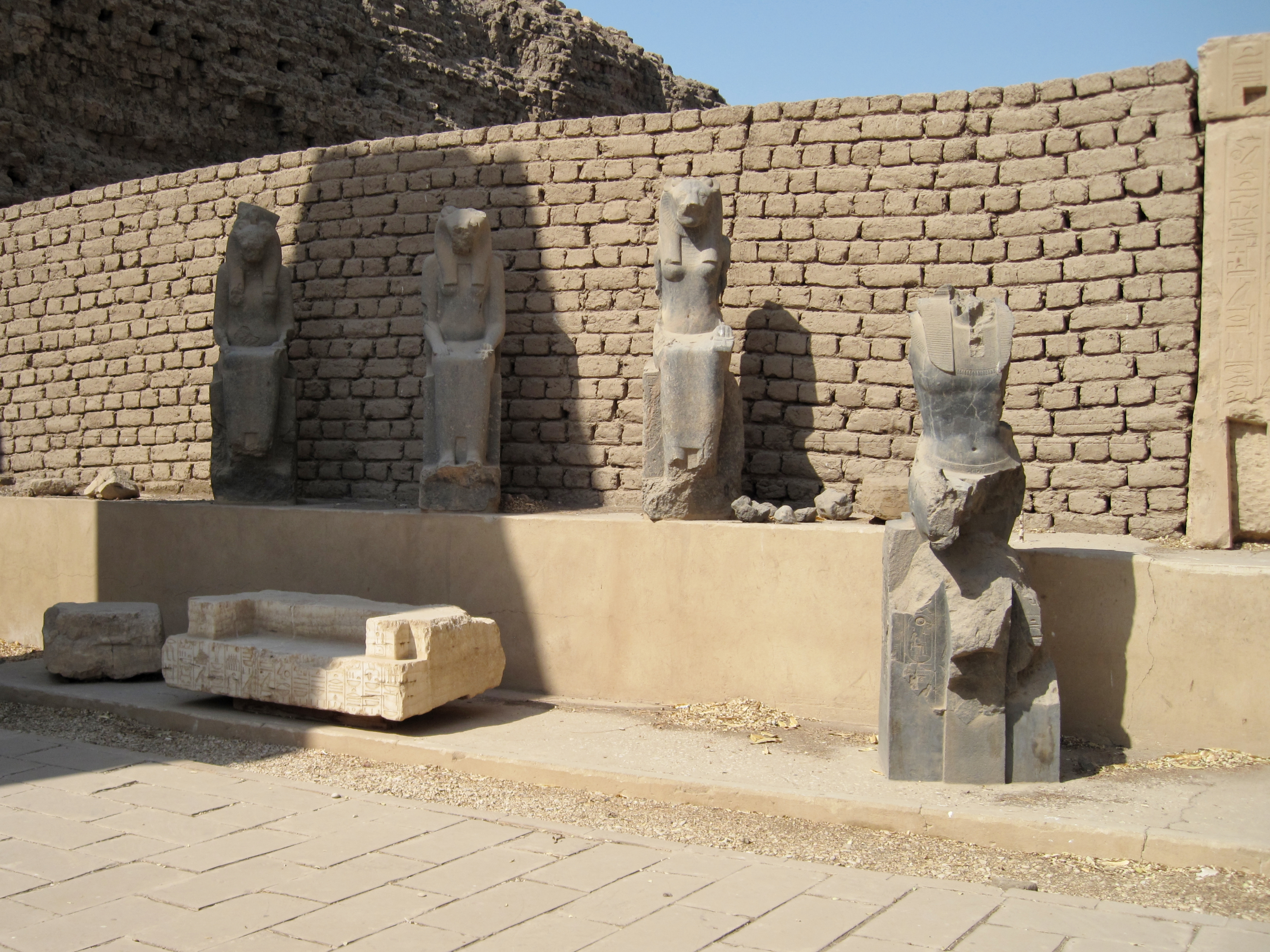
In situ at Karnak

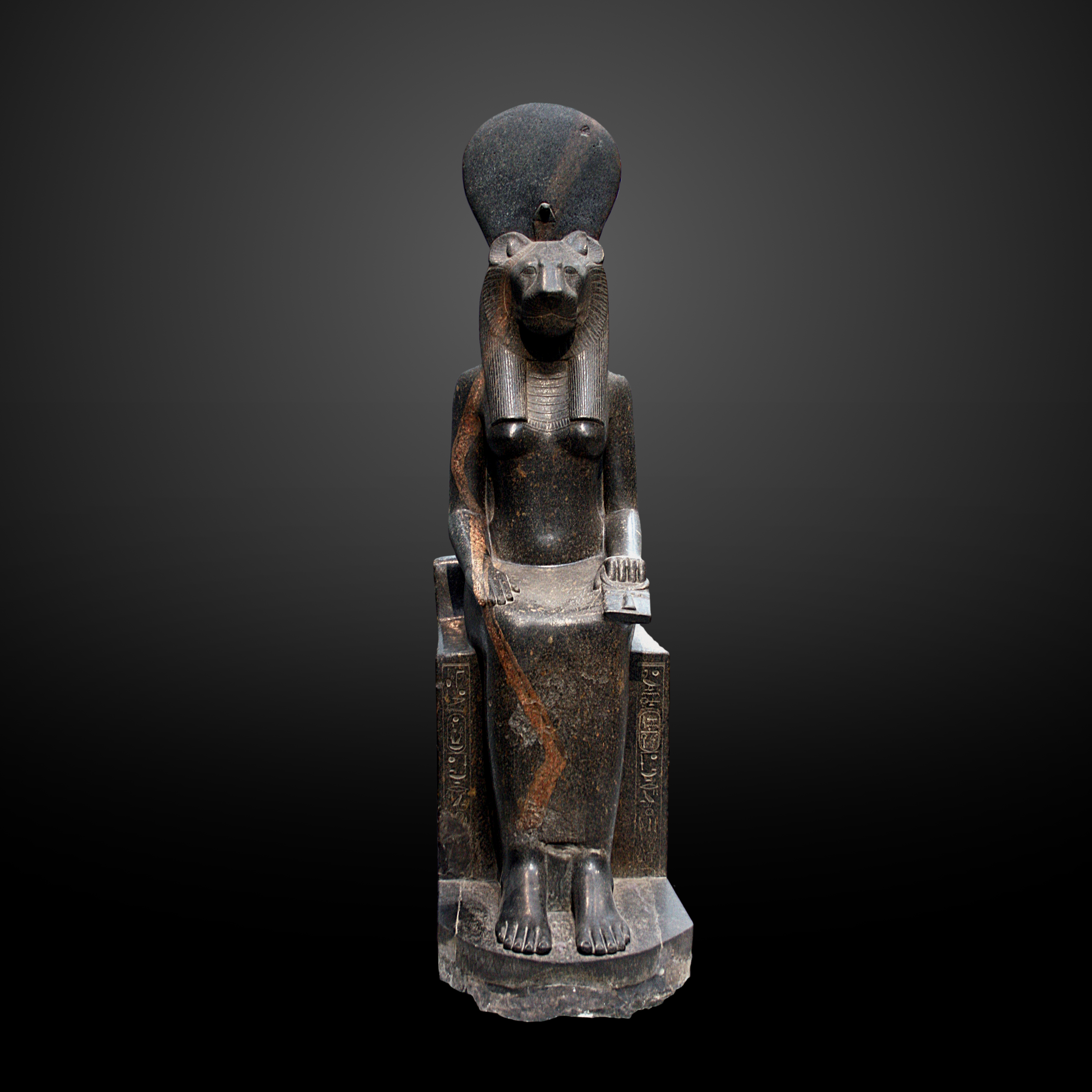
A-3, on display at the Louvre Museum

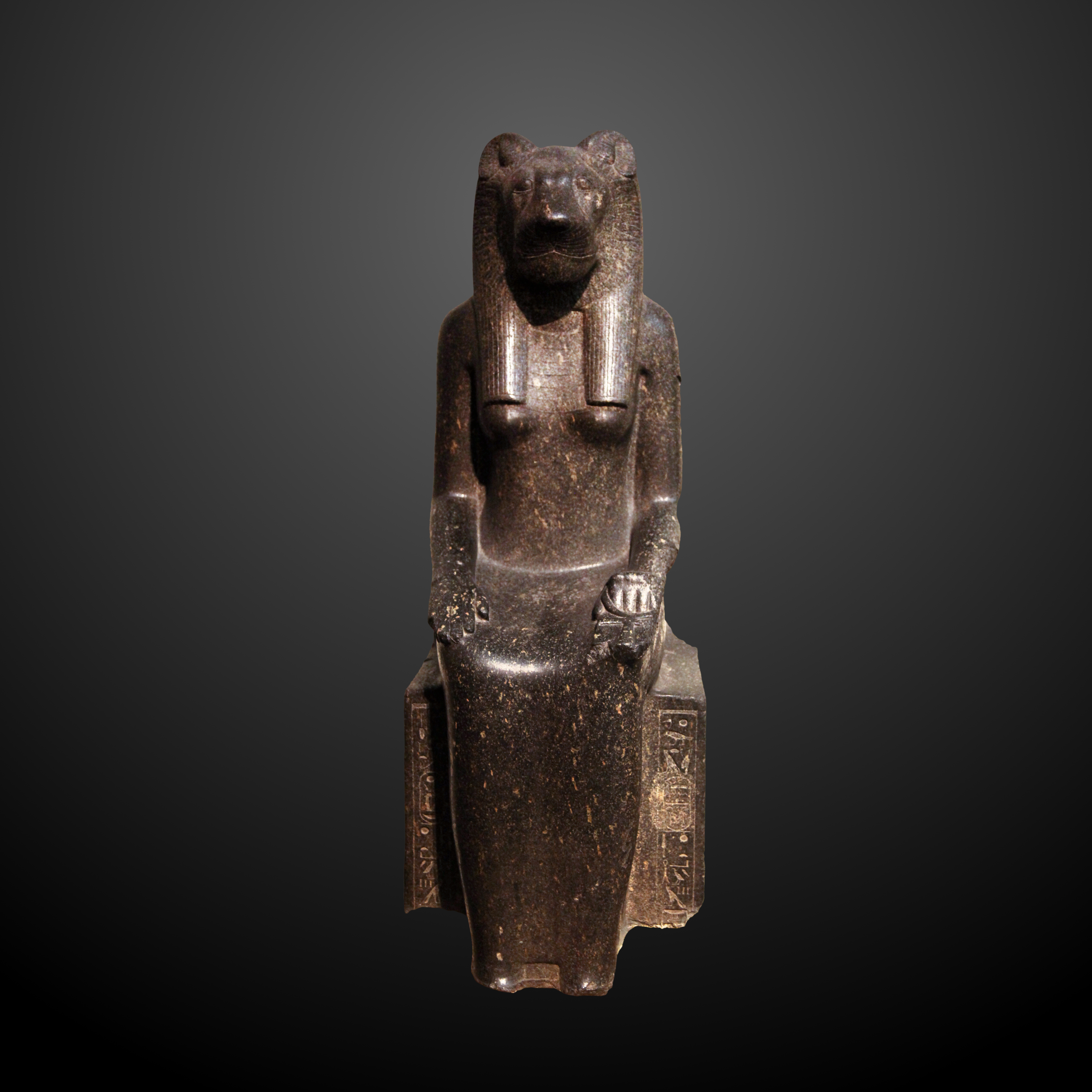
75.7, on display at the Museum of Fine Arts, Boston

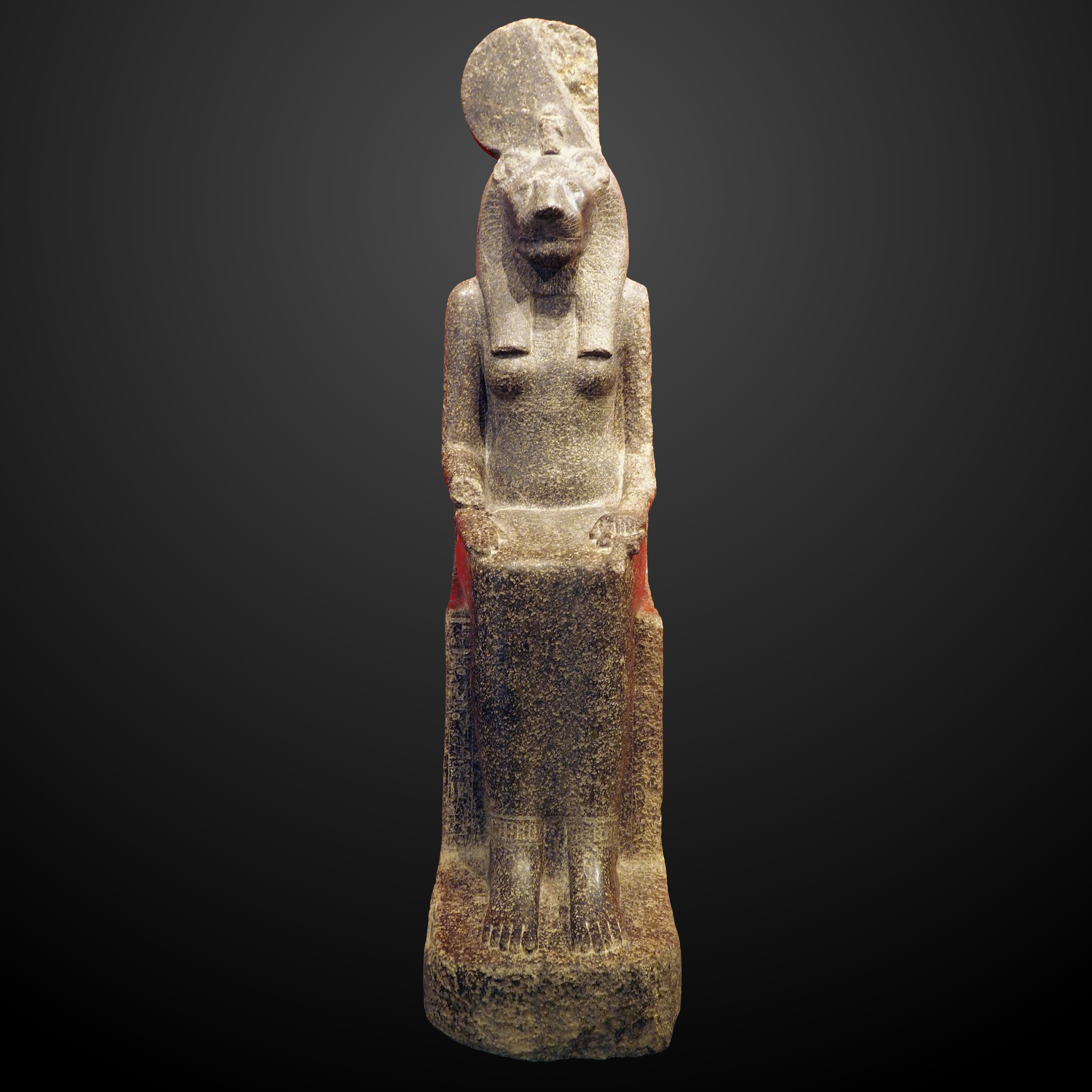
20926, on display at the Musée d'Art et d'Histoire of Geneva

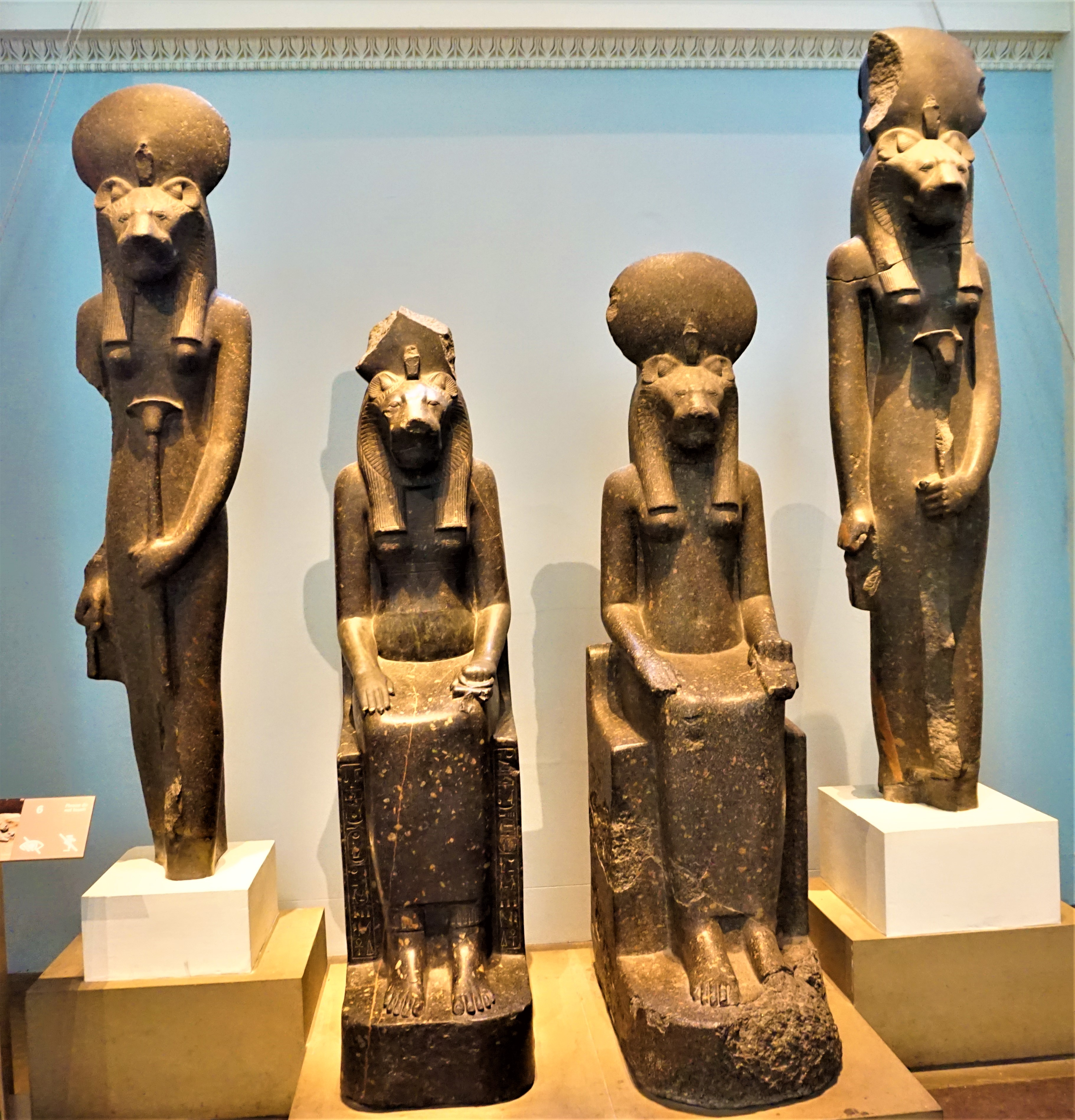
Several statues on display at the British Museum

== Ceramic figurines ==
Between 2001 and 2004, the Johns Hopkins expedition catalogued quite a number of female figurines found in the industrial areas south of the Sacred Lake. According to Waraksa after the four seasons of excavation, the total number of female figurines the expedition found was 42. There are six types of female figurines that can be found at the Mut Temple. Type 1 are handmade figures of nude females made out of marl clay. Type 2 depict women laying on beds and they can be made in fired clay or limestone. Type 3 figurines are molded from Nile silt or marl clay with flat backs, heavy hairstyles and high foreheads. The backs of the Type 3 figurines could smoothed by hand or a flat instrument of some kind. Type 4 are made from Nile silt as well and are greatest identified by their pinched heads, projecting arms facing outwards, one existing breast and wide hips. Type 5 figurines are similar to Type 3 in some ways, but they have flat, thin bodies with a smooth finish unlike Type 3 that have thicker and a somewhat rougher appearance. And Type 6, all the figurines found of this type are the lower bodies of females, these figurines appear to be the smallest-sized found at the Mut Precinct and seem to be handmade from Nile silt with a focus on having a large pubic triangle. The significance of these 42 figurines at the Mut Precinct is still questioned, however, Waraksa suggests that possible functions of the figurines could be connected to childbearing, as well as health related rituals.

== Recent discoveries ==
Since 2001, Bryan has led the excavation behind the Sacred Lake. Between 2002 and 2004, the excavation of the Mut Precinct, conducted by Bryan and her team, revealed a section of New Kingdom work fixings that included baking and brewing centers, as well as granaries. In January 2006, the expedition, after clearing some debris, found a life-sized statue of Queen Tiy, the wife of Amenhotep III, made of granite and that dates back to the 21st Dynasty. Bryan and her team discovered human remains south of the Sacred Lake in 2011, what was interesting about the remains is the orientation of the body, it was faced down and appeared to be constrained, even more interesting is the location of the skull, it seems as if it was purposely placed underneath a sandstone base for a wooden column. In 2012, The Johns Hopkins University expedition, directed by Bryan, found burials behind the Sacred Isheru Lake. Now in January 2015, the main goal of the JHU expedition is to excavate what is now considered a cemetery behind the sacred lake.

== Bibliography ==
Bryan, B. M. (2007). "2006 report on the Johns Hopkins University excavations at the Mut Temple". Bulletin of the American Research Center in Egypt, 191, 4–11.

Bryan, B. M. (2008). "A newly discovered statue of a queen from the reign of Amenhotep III". In D'Auria, S.H. (ed.) Servant of Mut: Studies in honor of Richard A. Fazzini. 32–43. Leiden; Boston: Brill.

Fazzini, R. A., Dijk J., (2007). "Recent work in the Mut Precinct at South Karnak", Egyptian Archaeology, 31, 10–13.

Fazzini, R. A., curator emeritus. (2015). "Brooklyn Museum and the Precinct of Mut".
