= Robert Hugh Benson =

British Catholic priest and writer (1871–1914)

The Right Reverend Monsignor Robert Hugh Benson AFSC KC*SG KGCHS
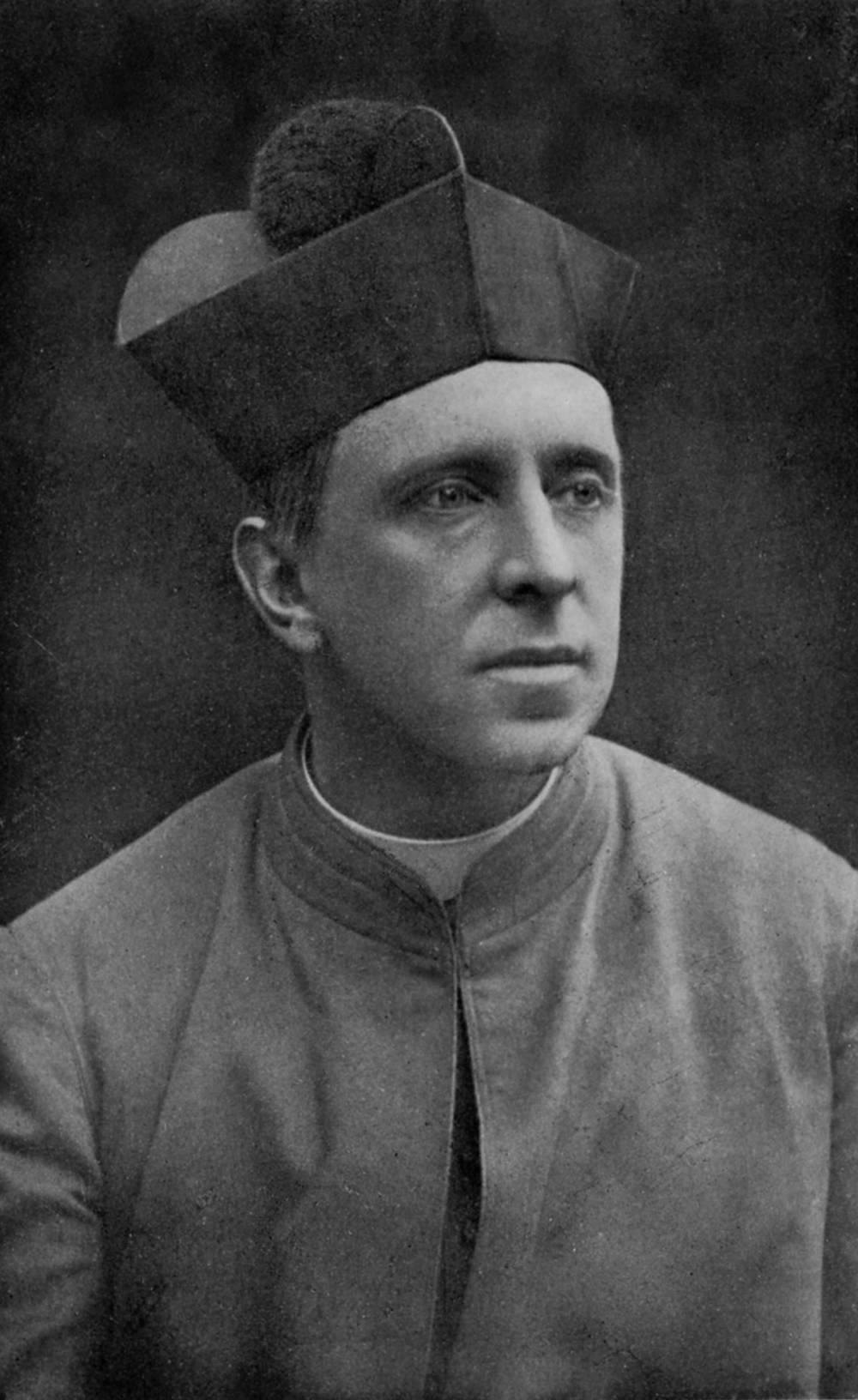
- 1912 portrait of Benson by G. Jerrard

Orders
- Ordination: 1895 (Anglican priest); 1904 (Catholic priest)

Personal details
- Born: Robert Hugh Benson; 18 November 1871 Berkshire, England, United Kingdom
- Died: 19 October 1914 (aged 42) Salford, Lancashire, England, United Kingdom
- Denomination: Catholic Church
- Parents: Edward White Benson and Mary Sidgwick Benson
- Education: Trinity College, Cambridge
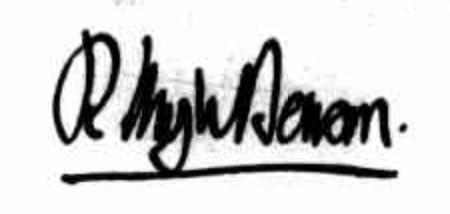
- Signature

Robert Hugh Benson AFSC KC*SG KGCHS (18 November 1871 – 19 October 1914) was an English Catholic priest and writer. First an Anglican priest, he was received into the Catholic Church in 1903 and ordained therein the next year. He was also a prolific writer of fiction, writing the notable dystopian novel Lord of the World, as well as Come Rack! Come Rope!.

Benson's output encompassed historical, horror and science fiction, contemporary fiction, children's stories, plays, apologetics, devotional works and articles. He continued his writing career at the same time as he progressed through the hierarchy to become a chamberlain to Pope Pius X in 1911 and gain the title of Monsignor before his death a few years later.

== Early life ==
Robert Hugh Benson was the youngest son of Edward White Benson, the Archbishop of Canterbury, and his wife, Mary; he was the younger brother of E. F. Benson, A. C. Benson and Margaret Benson.

He was educated at Eton College and then studied classics and theology at Trinity College, Cambridge, from 1890 to 1893.

In 1895, Benson was ordained a priest in the Church of England by his father the Archbishop.

== Career ==
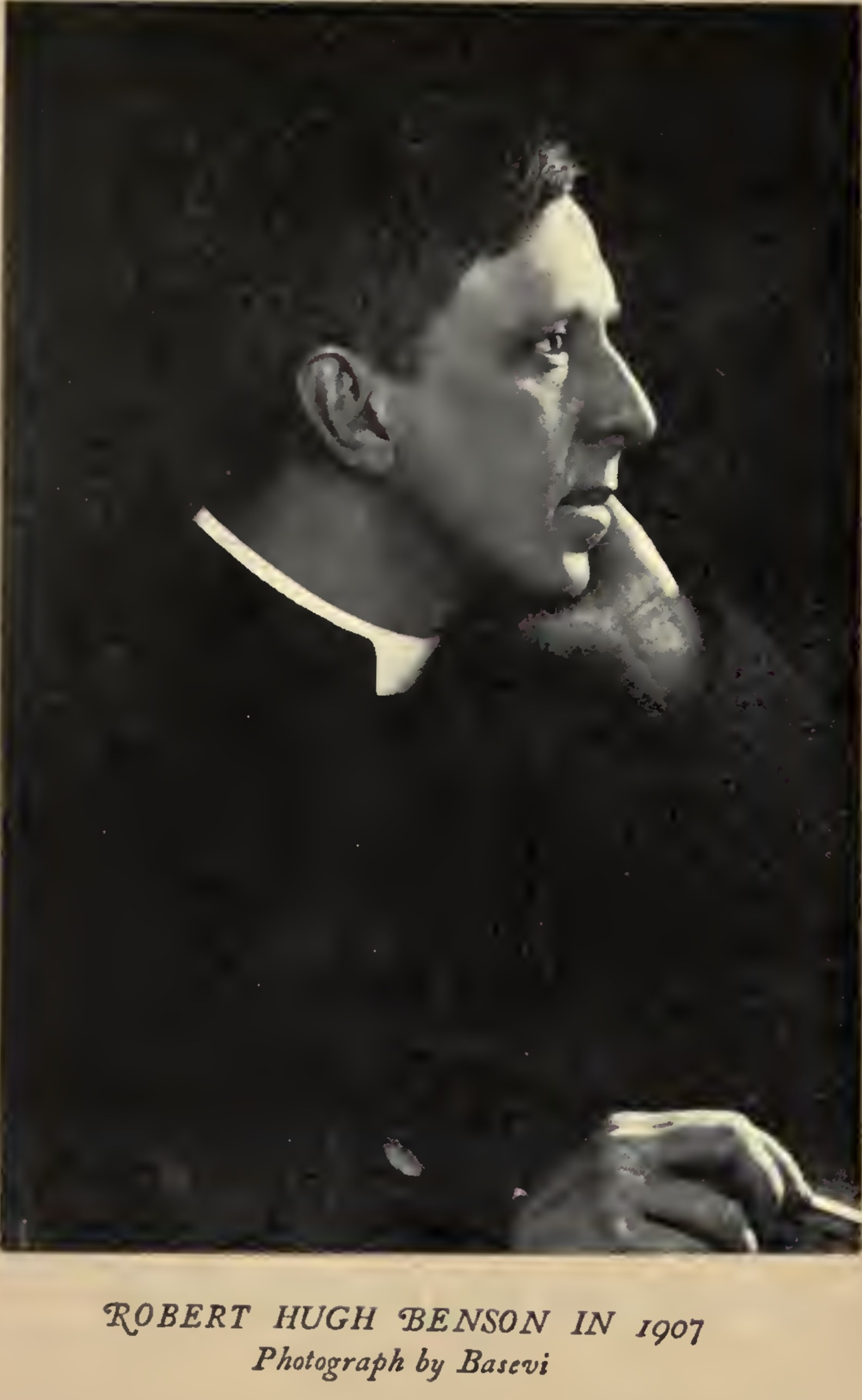
Benson in 1907

After his father died suddenly in 1896, Benson was sent on a trip to the Middle East to recover his own health. While there he began to question the status of the Church of England and to consider the claims of the Catholic Church, following a familiar religious path. His own piety began to tend toward the High Church tradition, and he started exploring religious life in various Anglican communities, eventually obtaining permission to join the Community of the Resurrection.

Benson made his profession as a member of the community in 1901, at which time he had no thoughts of leaving the Church of England. As he continued his studies and began writing, however, he became more and more uneasy with his own doctrinal position and, on 11 September 1903, he was received into the Catholic Church. Benson was ordained as a Catholic priest in 1904. As the son of the late Archbishop of Canterbury, his conversion and subsequent ordination caused a sensation.

Benson's first assignment was as a college chaplain. He had a stutter and is said to have had a "reedy' voice," but was a popular preacher, attracting large audiences wherever he spoke. In 1911 he was appointed a supernumerary private chamberlain to Pope Pius X and consequently styled as Monsignor.

In 1914, he visited the University of Notre Dame and gave an address on the papacy. Both Confessions of a Convert (1913) and Lourdes (1914) were serialized in Notre Dame's Ave Maria magazine, before appearing as books.

He was awarded the Dignitary of Honour of the Order of the Holy Sepulchre.

=== Novelist ===
Benson continued his writing career along with his ministry as a priest. Like both his brothers, Edward Frederic Benson ("Fred") and Arthur Christopher Benson, he wrote many ghost and horror stories, as well as children's stories and historical fiction. His horror and ghost fiction are collected in The Light Invisible (1903) and A Mirror of Shalott (1907). The Necromancers (1909) is a horror novel about the contemporary spiritualist movement.

His novel Lord of the World (1907) is generally regarded as one of the first modern dystopian novels. In the novel's speculative world of 2007, nations are armed with weapons which can destroy a whole city from the air within minutes. The Anglican Church and other Protestant denominations have crumbled and disappeared under a rising tide of secularism and atheism, and euthanasia is widely practised and considered a moral advance to reduce suffering. Only an embattled Catholic Church remains to champion the Christian faith. The Antichrist is depicted as a charismatic secular liberal politician who organizes an international body ostensibly devoted to world peace and universal love under his direction.

In a later novel, The Dawn of All (1911), Benson imagined an opposite future 1973 in which the Catholic Church has emerged victorious in England and worldwide after Germany and Austria won the "Emperor War" of 1914, and the Church's main remaining enemy is a Lenin-like international Communist leader. This book is also notable for its fairly accurate prediction of a global network of passenger air travel, aboard winged airships called volors.

His historical novels include the Reformation Trilogy: By What Authority (1905), The King’s Achievement (1905), and The Queen’s Tragedy (1907). Come Rack! Come Rope! (1912) describes the persecution of English Catholics during the Elizabethan era.

== Private life ==
As a young man, Benson recalled, he had rejected the idea of marriage as "quite inconceivable". He had a close friendship with the novelist Frederick Rolfe, with whom he had hoped to write a book on St. Thomas Becket, until Benson decided that he should not be associated (according to writer Brian Masters) "with a Venetian pimp and procurer of boys". Nevertheless, he maintained his friendship with Lord Alfred Douglas, the friend and lover of Oscar Wilde, and when an acquaintance protested that the connection with Douglas was inappropriate for him, he replied: "Lord Alfred Douglas is my friend, and he'll come down when he likes!"

== Death and legacy ==
Benson died of pneumonia in 1914 in Salford, where he had been preaching a mission; he was 42. As he had requested, he was buried in the orchard of Hare Street House, his house in the Hertfordshire village of Hare Street. A chapel, dedicated to St Hugh, was built over the site. Benson bequeathed the house to the Catholic Church as a country retreat for the Archbishop of Westminster. The Catholic church in the nearby town of Buntingford, which he helped finance, is dedicated to St Richard of Chichester, but is also known as the Benson Memorial Church.

In 2019, the house was put up for sale. Benson's remains were exhumed and moved to the crypt of St Edmund's College in Old Hall Green.

== Gallery ==
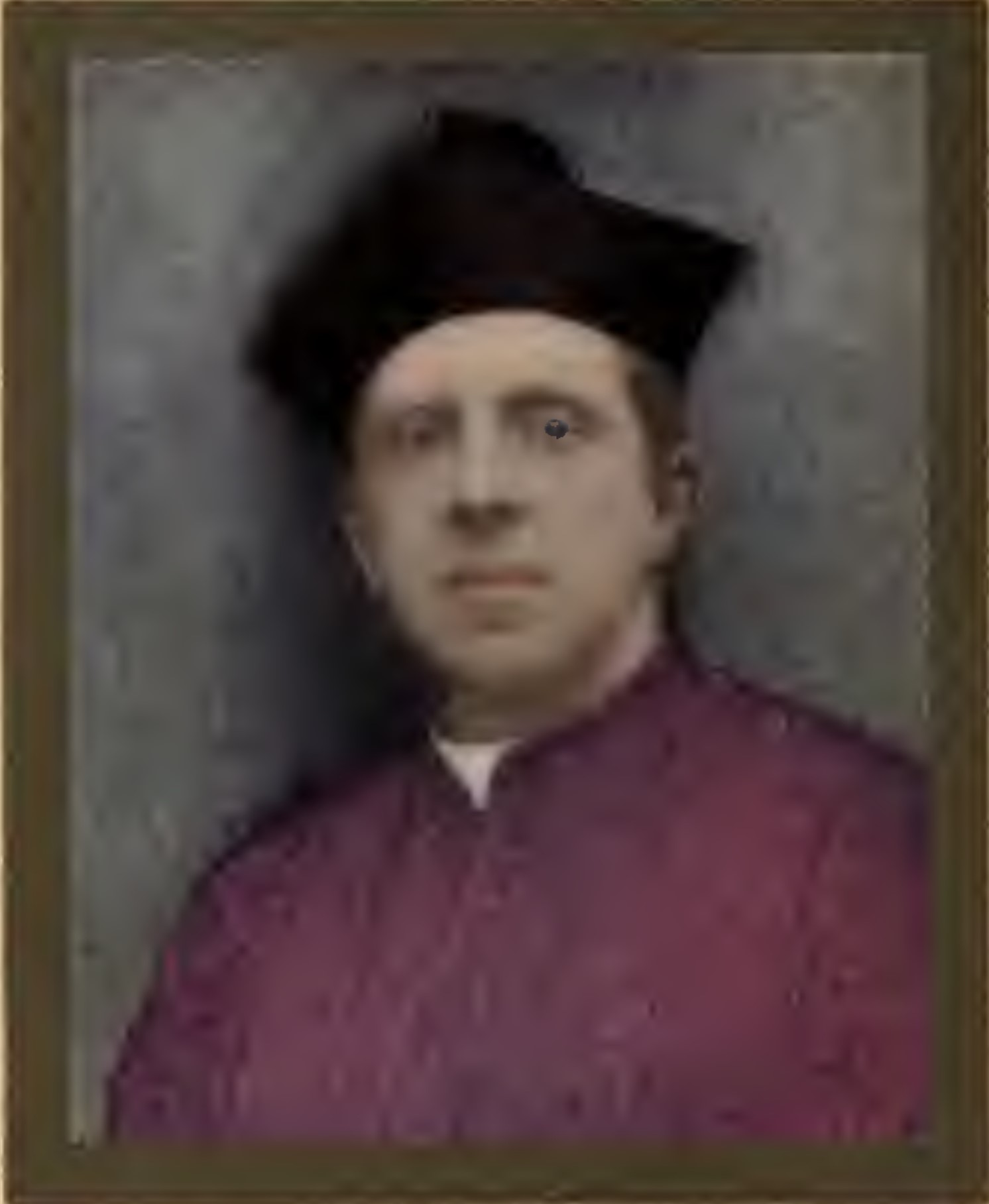
Portrait of Benson

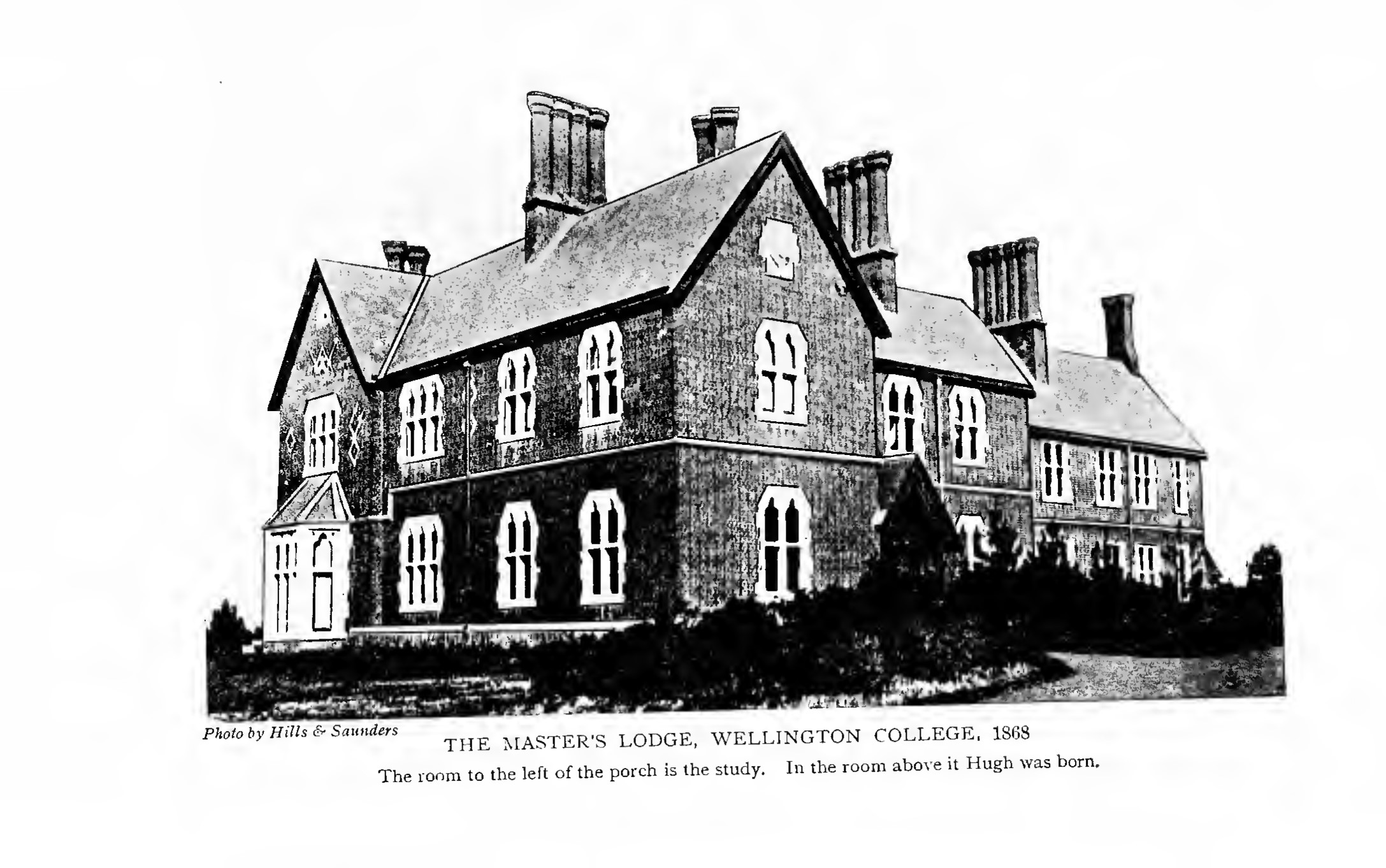
Benson's birthplace. From the book Hugh, Memoirs of a Brother

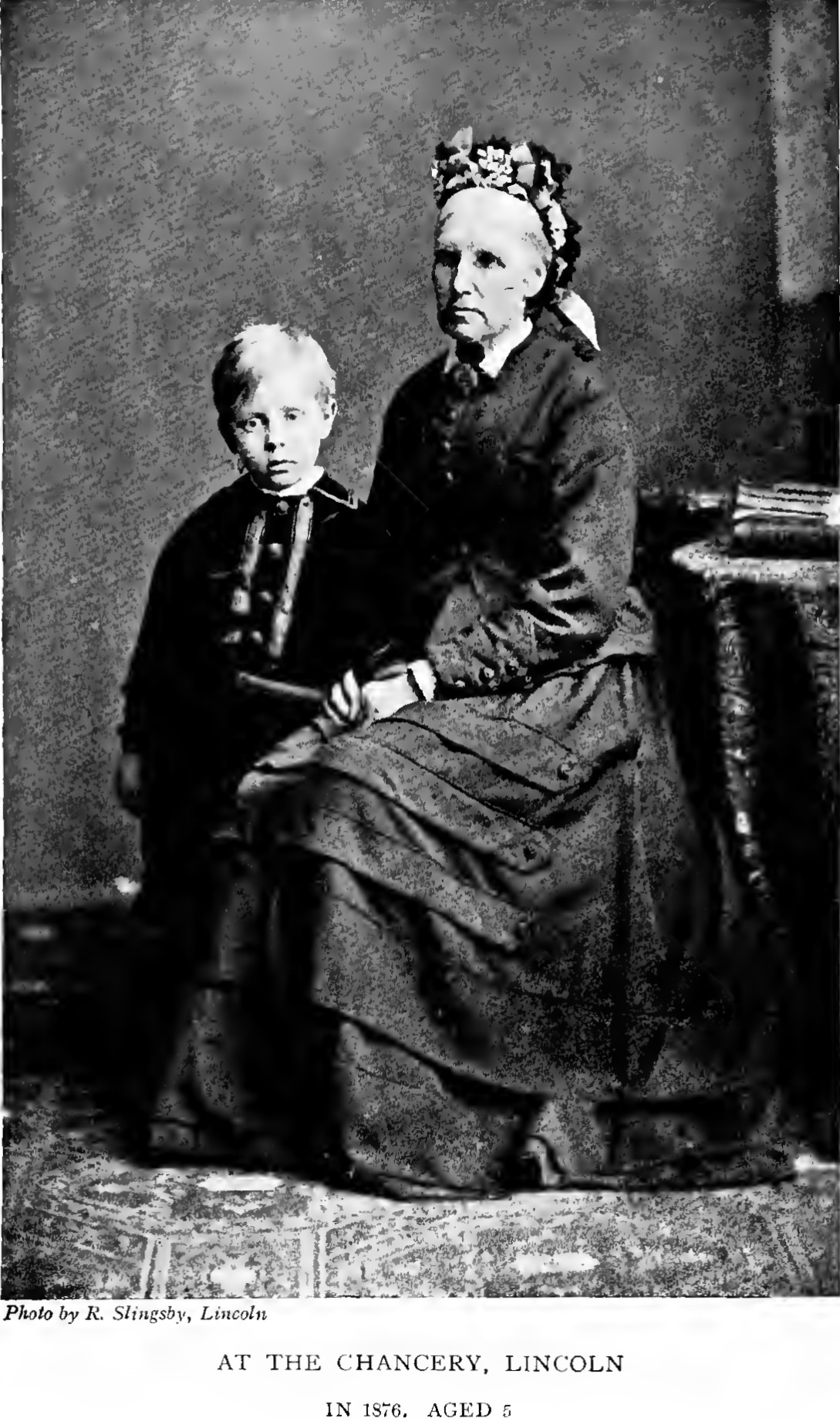
Benson, aged 5, with Beth at the Chancery, Lincoln, in 1876. From the book Hugh, Memoirs of a Brother

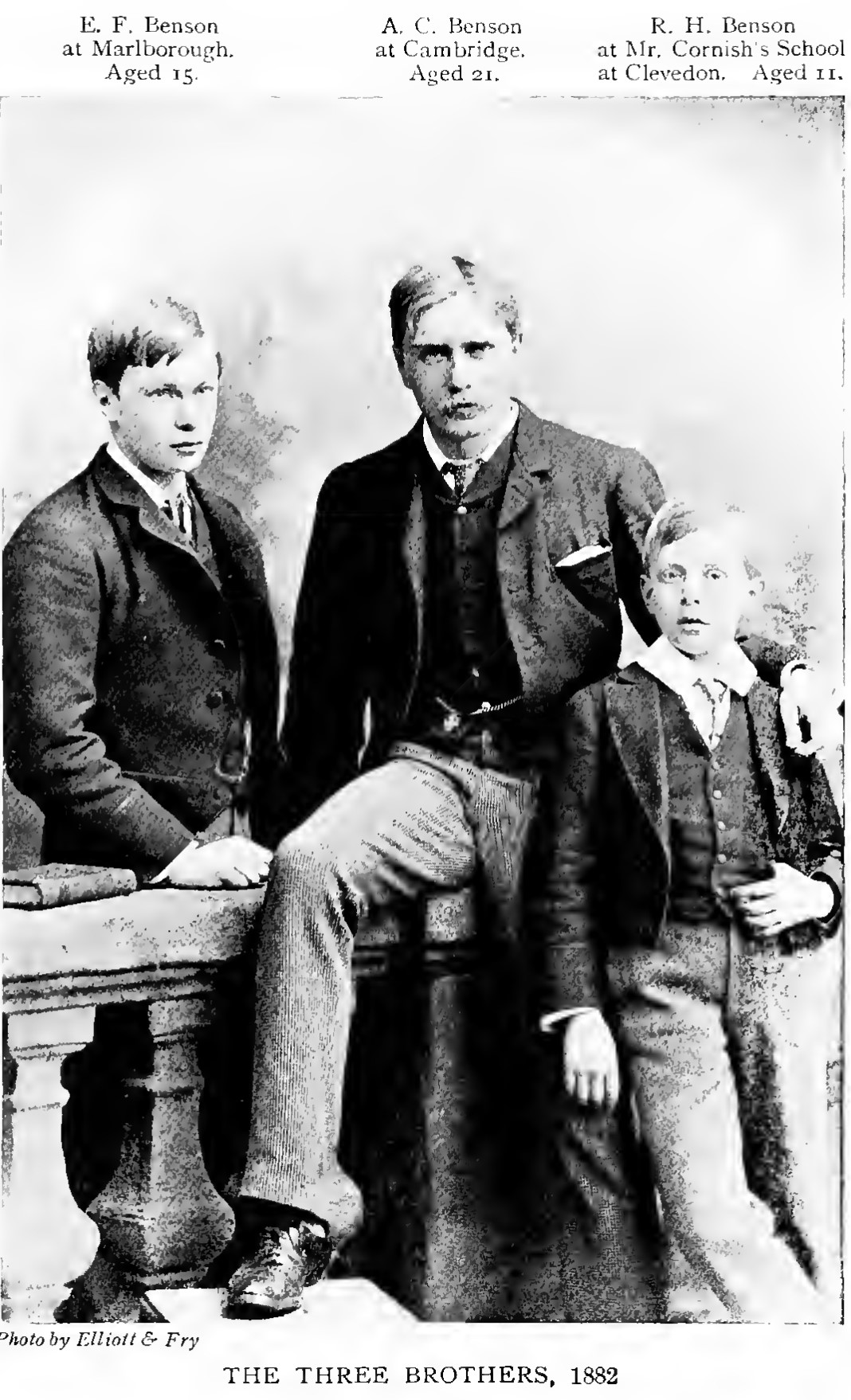
A. C. Benson, R. H. Benson and E. F. Benson, 1882. From the book Hugh, Memoirs of a Brother

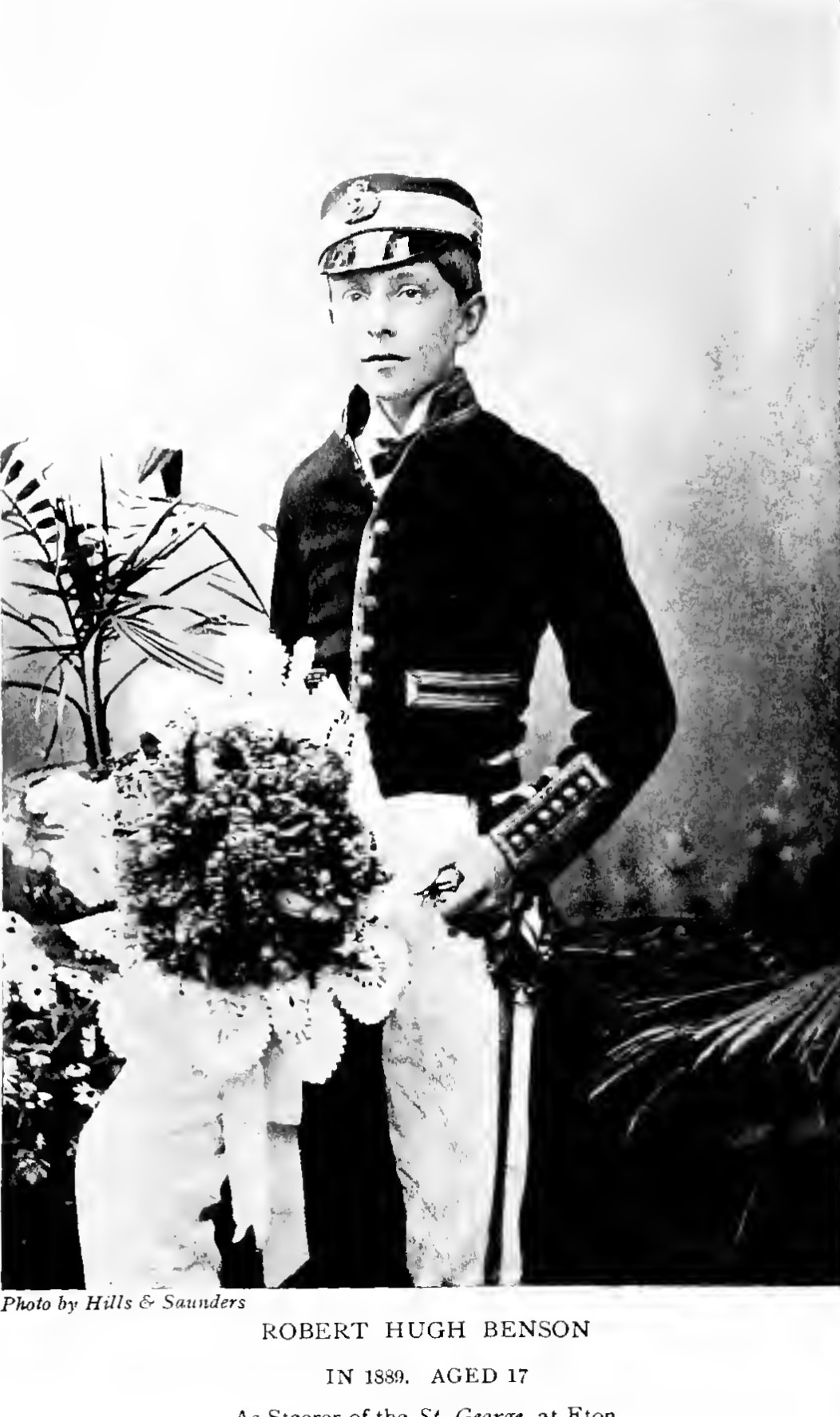
Benson in 1889, aged 17, as Steerer in the St George at Eton. From the book Hugh, Memoirs of a Brother

== Works ==
Science fiction

- A Mirror of Shalott, Benziger Brothers, 1907.
- Lord of the World, Dodd, Mead & Company, 1908 [1st Pub. 1907].
- The Dawn of All, B. Herder, 1911.

Historical fiction

- By What Authority?, Isbister, 1904. Republished in 2022 by The Cenacle Press with a foreword by Joseph Pearce and new illustrations by Jerzy Ozga.
- Come Rack! Come Rope!, Dodd, Mead & Co., 1913 [1st Pub. 1912].
- Oddsfish!, Dodd, Mead & Co., 1914.
- The King's Achievement, Burns Oates & Washbourne, Lrd., 1905. Republished in 2022 by The Cenacle Press with a foreword by Joseph Pearce and new illustrations by Jerzy Ozga.
- The Queen's Tragedy, Sir Isaac Pitman & Sons Ltd., 1907.
- The History of Richard Raynal, Solitary, Sir Isaac Pitman & Sons Ltd., 1912.
- Initiation, Dodd, Mead & Co., 1914.

Contemporary fiction

- The Light Invisible, Sir Isaac Pitman and Sons Ltd., 1906.
- The Sentimentalists, Sir Isaac Pitman and Sons Ltd., 1906.
- The Conventionalists, Hutchinson & Co., 1908.
- The Necromancers, Hutchinson & Co., 1909. (This was adapted as Spellbound (1941 film)
- A Winnowing, B. Herder, 1910.
- None other gods, B. Herder, 1911. Republished by Cluny Media.
- The Coward, B. Herder, 1912.
- An Average Man, Dodd, Mead & Company, 1913.
- Loneliness?, Dodd, Mead & Co., 1915.

Children's books

- Alphabet of Saints, with Reginald Balfour and Charles Ritchie, illustrated by L. D. Symington, Oates & Washbourne, 1905.
- A Child's Rule of Life, illustrated by Gabriel Pippet.
- Old Testament Rhymes, illustrated by Gabriel Pippet.

Devotional works

- Vexilla Regis: A Book of Devotions and Intercessions, Longmans, Green & Co., 1915 [1st Pub. 1914].
- A Book of the Love of Jesus: A Collection of Ancient English Devotions in Prose and Verse, Isaac Pitman & Sons, 1915.
- The Friendship of Christ, Longmans, Green & Co., 1914 [1st Pub. 1912]. Republished in 2022 by The Cenacle Press.

Apologetic works

- The Religion of the Plain Man, Burns & Oates, 1906.
- Papers of a Pariah, Longmans, Green & Co., 1907. Republished 2022 by the Cenacle Press.
- Non-Catholic Denominations, Longmans, Green & Co., 1910.
- Christ in the Church: A Volume of Religious Essays, Longmans, Green & Co., 1911. Republished 2022 by The Cenacle Press.
- Confessions of a Convert, Longmans, Green & Co., 1913. Republished 2022 by The Cenacle Press.
- Paradoxes of Catholicism, Longmans, Green & Co., 1913.
- Lourdes, The Manresa Press, 1914.
- Spiritual Letters of Monsignor R. Hugh Benson: to One of his Converts, Longmans, Green & Co., 1915.
- A Book of Essays, Catholic Truth Society, 1916.
- Sermon Notes, First Series: Anglican, Second Series: Catholic, Longmans, Green & Co., 1917.

Plays

- The Cost of a Crown, a Story of Douay & Durham; a Sacred Drama in Three Acts, Longmans, Green & Co., 1910.
- A Mystery Play in Honour of the Nativity of Our Lord, Longmans, Green, and Co., 1908.
- The Maid of Orleans, a Drama of the Life of Joan of Arc, Longmans, Green & Co., 1911.
- The Upper Room, a Drama of Christ's Passion, Longmans, Green & Co., 1914.

Selected articles

- "The Conversion of England," The American Ecclesiastical Review, Vol. XXXIV, 1906.
- "The State of Religion in England," The Catholic World, Vol. LXXXIV, October 1906/March 1907.
- "A Modern Theory of Human Personality," The Dublin Review, Vol. CXLI, 1907.
- "The Dissolution of the Religious Houses." In: Renascence and Reformation (From The Cambridge History of English Literature, 15 Vols.), 1908.
- "Letters of Queen Victoria, 1837-1861," The Dublin Review, Vol. CXLII, January/April 1908.
- "Christian Science," The Dublin Review, Vol. CXLIII, No. 286, October 1908.
- "Spiritualism," The Dublin Review, Vol. CXLV, No. 290-291, July/October, 1909.
- "A Catholic Colony," The Dublin Review, Vol. CXLVI, January/April, 1910.
- "Catholicism and the Future," The Atlantic Monthly, Vol. CVI, 1910.
- "Phantasms of the Dead," The Dublin Review, Vol. CL, No. 300-301, January/April, 1912.
- "Cosmopolitanism and Catholicism," The North American Review, September 1912.
- "Cardinal Gasquet," The Dublin Review, Vol. CLV, July/October, 1914.

Other

- The Holy Blissful Martyr Saint Thomas of Canterbury, Benziger Brothers, 1910.
- The Life of Saint Teresa, Herbert & Daniel, 1912. (Preface only (20 pages), author is Alice Lady Lovat)
- Poems, Burns & Oates, 1914.
- Maxims from the Writings of Mgr. Benson, By the compiler of "Thoughts from Augustine Birrell," R. & T. Washbourne Ltd., 1915.

== See also ==
- G. K. Chesterton
- Gerard Manley Hopkins
- John Henry Newman
- List of dystopian literature

== Bibliography ==
- Beesley, Thomas Quinn (1916). "The Poetry of Robert Hugh Benson," The Catholic Educational Review, Vol. XII, pp. 122–134.
- Benson, Arthur C. (1915). Hugh: Memoirs of a Brother. London: Smith, Elder & Co.
- Bleiler, Everett (1948). The Checklist of Fantastic Literature. Chicago: Shasta Publishers.
- Bour'his, Jean Morris le (1980). Robert Hugh Benson, Homme de Foi et Artiste. Atelier Reproduction de Thèses, Université de Lille III.
- Braybrooke, Patrick (1931). "Robert Hugh Benson; Novelist and Philosopher." In: Some Catholic Novelists. London: Burns, Oates & Washbourne.
- Brown, Stephen J.M. & Thomas McDermott (1945). A Survey of Catholic Literature. Milwaukee: The Bruce Publishing Company.
- Concannon, Helena (1914). "Robert Hugh Benson, Novelist," Part II, The Catholic World, Vol. XCIX, pp. 487–498, 635–645.
- Gorce, Agnès de La (1928). Robert Hugh Benson: Prêtre et Romancier, 1871-1914. Paris: Plon.
- Grayson, Janet (1998). Robert Hugh Benson: Life and Works. Lanham, Md.: University Press of America.
- Marshall, George. "Two Autobiographical Narratives of Conversion: Robert Hugh Benson and Ronald Knox." British Catholic History 24.2 (1998): 237–253.
- Martindale, C.C. (1916). The Life of Monsignor Robert Hugh Benson, Vol. 2. London: Longmans, Green & Co.
- McMahon, Joseph H. (1915). "The Late Monsignor Robert Hugh Benson," Records of the American Catholic Historical Society of Philadelphia, Vol. XXVI, pp. 55–63.
- McMahon, Joseph H. (1915). "Robert Hugh Benson: A Personal Memory," The Bookman, Vol. XLI, pp. 160–169.
- Monaghan, Sister Mary Saint Rita (1985). Monsignor Robert Hugh Benson: His Apostolate and Its Message for Our Time. Brisbane, Qld.: Boolarong Publications.
- Parr, Olive Katherine (1915). Robert Hugh Benson: An Appreciation. London: Hutchinson & Co.
- Ross, Allan (1915). Monsignor Hugh Benson (1871-1914). The Catholic Truth Society.
- Shadurski, Maxim (2020). The Nationality of Utopia: H. G. Wells, England, and the World State. London; New York: Routledge. ISBN 9780367330491. (Chapter 3 features an in-depth discussion of The Dawn of All.)
- Shuster, Norman (1922). "Robert Hugh Benson and the Aging Novel." In: The Catholic Spirit in Modern English Literature. New York: The Macmillan Company, pp. 208–228.
- Warre Cornish, Blanche (1914). Memorials of Robert Hugh Benson. New York: P.J. Kenedy & Sons.
- Watt, Reginald J.J. (1918). Robert Hugh Benson: Captain in God's Army. London: Burns & Oates Ltd.
