= Emma Andrews =

American patron of archaeologists (1837–1922)

Emma Buttles Andrews (1837–1922) was a wealthy patron of archaeologists. As the companion of Theodore M. Davis, she accompanied him on excavations, documenting excavation finds and mapping tombs. Andrews served as honorary treasurer for the Newport branch of the Egypt Exploration Fund (now the Egypt Exploration Society), in which Davis also served as a board member. The couple made a total of 17 trips along the Nile River aboard Davis's yacht the Bedawin, mainly to the Valley of the Kings in the hopes of uncovering new royal tombs. Her diaries from those trips give researchers rare glimpses into her work with Davis in Egypt.

== Personal life ==
Andrews born in Columbus, Ohio on June 13, 1837, to Joel and Lauretta Buttles. She married Abner L. Andrews in 1859, and gave birth to their son Charles Buttles in 1859. Andrews had had a miscarriage in 1860. Her son died at the age of 9.

Her husband became paralyzed and confined to his bed at age 27, and she cared for him for twenty years until they agreed to separate. Abner's father created a bequest to Emma that, upon his death in 1865, granted her a considerable sum. In 1889, Andrews moved in with Newport, Rhode Island millionaire lawyer and archaeologist Theodore M. Davis and his wife, Annie Buttles, who was Emma's cousin. Andrews was Davis's mistress and traveling companion.

== Expeditions in Egypt ==
In 1900, Andrews and Davis agreed to fund Percy Newberry's excavations at Abd el Kurneh, and began funding Howard Carter the following year.

In 1902, the Department of Antiquities authorized Davis to excavate Wadi Biban el-Muluk, the Valley of the Kings. Andrews and Davis funded and supervised excavations for 11 years, locating 24 tombs. Andrews documented the excavations and items found, as well as a record of visitors to the sites. Andrews spent much of her time creating sketches and drawings of Davis' excavations, sitting outside the tombs and excavation sites during the process itself. She was constantly recording in her journal the conversations of the excavators and Davis. Andrews spent much of her time watching the excavation of the tomb of Yuya and Thuyu that Davis and Arthur Weigall worked together on in the heat of Egypt, adding comments such as "I thought he had been affected by bad air, but it was only excitement - for he ejaculated 'wonderful,' 'extraordinary,' etc" in reference to Weigall emerging from the tomb after uncovering a significant portion. Davis went on to continue his excavation of this tomb, even after experts claimed it a lost cause. Andrews commented, remembering "A dim glitter of gold everywhere and a confusion of coffins and mummies."

In January 1903, Andrews and Davis met with Howard Carter several times to discuss the discoveries of the tombs of Maiherpri and Thothmes IV. Andrews remarked that a leather loincloth discovered in the former tomb was some of "the most wonderful work I have seen in Egypt", and had described the discovery of the latter as a "fine success for [Davis] and Carter" for the contents found within, which Andrews records in her diary as being "a splendid sarcophagus, beautiful wall decorations and floor strewn with blue pottery more or less broken".

Andrews was present for the 1905 first opening of the tomb of Yuya, grandfather of Akhenaten and great-grandfather of Tutankhamen, which was considered to be one of the greatest discoveries of Egyptology until eclipsed by Carter's discovery of the tomb of Tutankhamen, and had noted with pride in her diary that, since experts considered it unlikely for a tomb to be in this location, it was only by Davis' thoroughness that the tomb was discovered.

They left Egypt for good in 1914. By 1916, Andrews was living in New York City, Davis having died the previous year. Andrews died in 1922, leaving $25,000 to the Metropolitan Museum of Art.

== Education advocacy ==
Andrews was elected in 1887 as Vice President for the Newport Industrial School for Girls shortly after moving in with Davis. She was a patron of the American Mission School for Girls in Luxor.
