= Mut =

Ancient Egyptian mother goddess

- A contemporary image of goddess Mut, depicted as a woman wearing the double crown plus a royal vulture headdress, associating her with Nekhbet.
Name in hieroglyphs
G14 t H8 B1 or mt t B1
- Major cult center: Thebes
- Symbol: the Vulture

Genealogy
- Parents: Ra
- Siblings: Sekhmet, Hathor, Ma'at and Bastet
- Consort: Amun
- Offspring: Khonsu

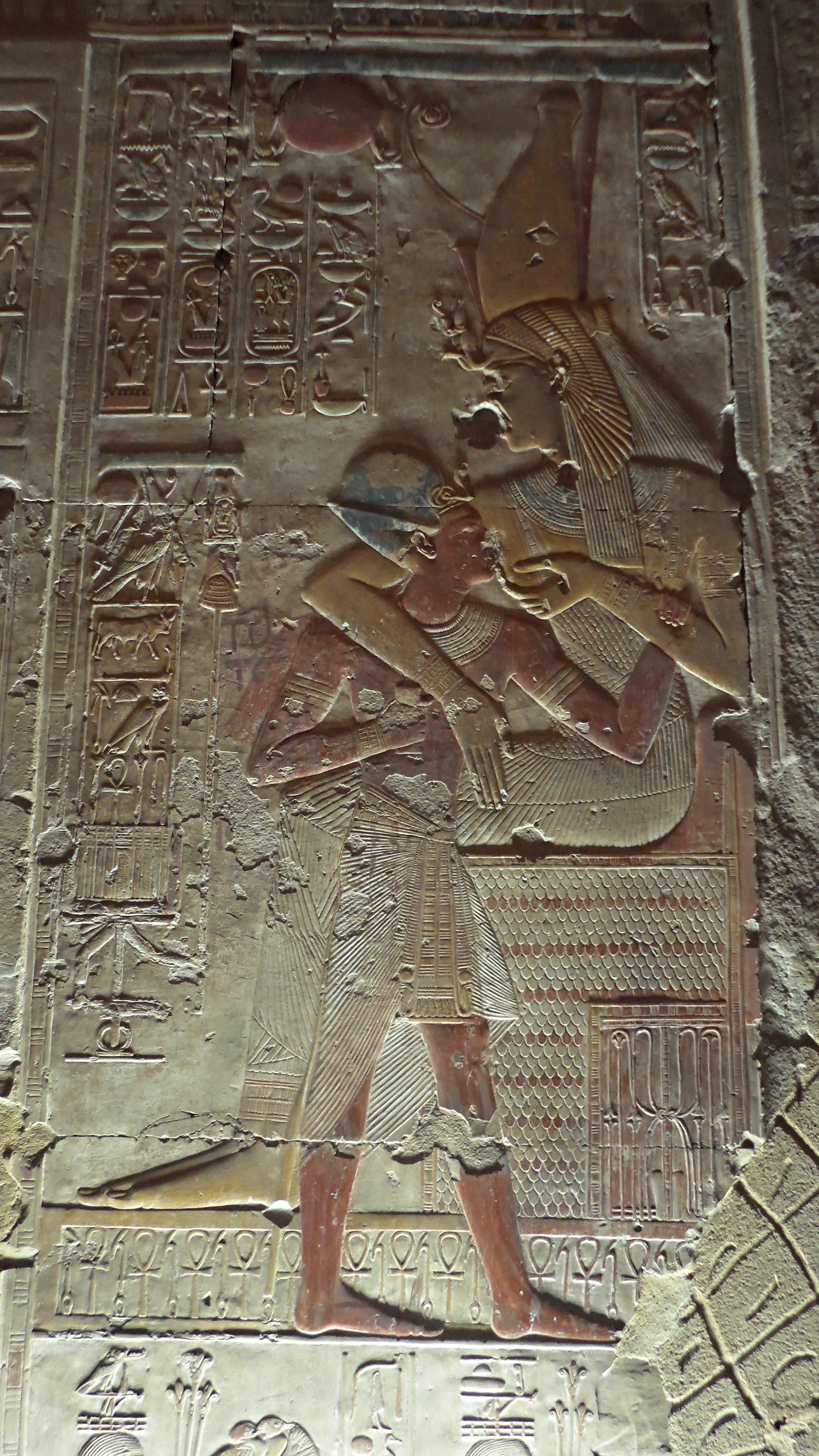
Mut nursing the pharaoh, Seti I, in relief from the second hypostyle hall of Seti's mortuary temple in Abydos.

Mut (Ancient Egyptian: mwt; also transliterated as Maut and Mout) was a mother goddess worshipped in ancient Egypt. Her name means mother in the ancient Egyptian language. Mut had many different aspects and attributes that changed and evolved greatly over the thousands of years of ancient Egyptian culture.

Mut was considered a primal deity, associated with the primordial waters of Nu from which everything in the world was born. Mut was sometimes said to have given birth to the world through parthenogenesis, but more often she was said to have a husband, the solar creator god Amun-Ra. Although Mut was believed by her followers to be the mother of everything in the world, she was particularly associated as the mother of the lunar child god Khonsu. At the Temple of Karnak in Egypt's capital city of Thebes, the family of Amun-Ra, Mut and Khonsu were worshipped together as the Theban Triad.

In art, Mut was usually depicted as a woman wearing the double crown of the kings of Egypt, representing her power over the whole of the land.

During the high point of Mut's cult, the rulers of Egypt would support her worship in their own way to emphasize their own authority and right to rule through an association with Mut. Mut was involved in many ancient Egyptian festivals such as the Opet Festival and the Beautiful Festival of the Valley.

== Mythology ==
=== Theban cosmogony ===
In Theban creation myths, Mut is depicted as a serpent, who emerged from the primordial waters alongside her father the dt-serpent, a form of Amun-Ra. She embodies the Uraeus crown of the first god and uses her eyes to illuminate the world. She also embodies the stem of the primordial lotus blossom. Amun sometimes appears in two distinct forms: Kematef, the first creator and father of Mut, and Amun-Irta, who is described as being Kematefs Ba, son, and heir.

=== Role in the Theban triad ===
Mut did not originate as the wife of Amun. She appears as an independent goddess also outside Thebes and had her own temples and priesthood. Studies on the origins of Amun in Karnak suggest that elements of Min’s theology were incorporated into Amun’s divine identity, including a family structure consisting of a male deity (Min), a female counterpart (Mut-Min), and a son (Min-Hor-Nacht). the Seventeenth Dynasty rulers showed interest in Coptos and its deity Min, restoring his temple and launching expeditions from the region. While Amun’s association with Ra began under Senusret I, the integration of Min’s theological aspects likely occurred between the Seventeenth and early Eighteenth Dynasty as part of the broader efforts to solidify religious and political legitimacy. While Min’s iconography was adopted in the Eleventh Dynasty, the integration of Mut-Min as Amun-Ra’s consort likely occurred later, no earlier than the Seventeenth Dynasty.

Mut was the consort of Amun, the patron deity of pharaohs during the Middle Kingdom (c. 2055–1650 BC) and New Kingdom (c. 1550–1070 BC). Amunet and Wosret may have been Amun's consorts early in Egyptian history, but Mut, who did not appear in texts or art until the late Middle Kingdom, displaced them. However, it is possible that Mut is simply a later name for Wosret. The first documented depiction of Amun, Mut and Khonsu as a triad dates from the reign of queen Hatshepsut.

Mut and Khonsu each have their own separate sanctuaries, distinct from Amun’s. Although they are often depicted together with Amun in his temple or elsewhere, they are rarely directly associated with his name. Their connection to Amun was secondary and relatively loose, despite appearing as a fixed divine family when the Amun cult spread to Nubia, the oases, and other regions.

Amun and Khonsu are often depicted as father and son, but were also viewed as two manifestations of the same god, representing a continuous cycle of death and rebirth—Amun as the aged form and Khonsu as the youthful, reborn version. Since Amun is periodically reborn as Khonsu, Mut’s role within the divine triad is fluid; she can be wife, mother, and daughter. This shifting relationship reflects the broader concept that Egyptian triads are subdivisions of the primeval and androgynous creator god, who initially impregnated and gave birth to himself. She is called “the daughter and mother who created her own father” and “the mother who became a daughter.” In some texts, she is depicted as the great serpent who encircles her father Ra, and rebirthes him as the god Khonsu. This concept aligns with Amun's portrayal as "the bull of his mother," a title borrowed from Min of Coptos, emphasizing self-creation.

The influence of Heliopolitan theology let to the combination of Amun and Ra into Amun-Ra, as well as the creation of the Theban local forms of Mut-Tefnut and Khonsu-Shu.

=== Eye of Ra ===
The epithet “Eye of Ra” has been used for Mut since the nineteenth dynasty, but does not appear to have been used for Mut in the Eighteenth Dynasty. The myth of the Eye of the Sun and the devastation of the Eye of the Sun in Thebes seem to be older than the cult of Mut. In the Leiden hymn to Amun it is the embodiment of Thebes itself as the goddess who, in the form of Sekhmet, drinks from the waters of Isheruh in Thebes. A text from the time of Thutmoses III also mentions festivities in honor of lioness goddesses such as Bastet, Shesmetet and Wadjet.

The Demotic Papyrus of Leiden records the myth of the return of the Eye of Ra to Egypt. The central figure is a wandering goddess, initially named Tefnut, who takes the form of a sacred cat and briefly a lioness. Her name changes to Mut as she enters Thebes and to Hathor when she reconciles with her father Amun-Ra.In the myth, Ra’s daughter, angered, leaves Egypt and retreats to Ethiopia as a wild cat. Ra sends the god Thoth, in the form of a baboon, to persuade her to return. Initially, she reacts aggressively, but Thoth calms her with a fable about divine retribution for broken oaths, convincing her to spare his life.Thoth then appeals to her emotions, reminding her of her homeland, her twin brother Shu, and the importance of returning to Egypt. Offering her delightful food, he soothes her anger, and she begins to sing praises of her homeland, reinforcing the longing for one's origin.

She then transforms into a vulture and flies to Egypt, arriving in Elkab. There, she appears in vulture form and then transforms into a gazelle when she reached Thebes. While resting near Thebes under the protection of the Thoth, she is attacked by followers of Apophis, the serpent of chaos. The baboon warns her, and they flee together in a boat, hiding in the reeds.The myth then describes rituals performed in Thebes in her honor, including songs sung to her to soothe and welcome her.In the end, Mut resumes her divine form as Tefnut, the goddess of moisture and unites with her father Ra.

The appeasement of the sun's eye and the reconciliation with her father Amun-Ra was celebrated by playing music, dancing and singing in the Mut destrik. The holding of such festivities in honor of Mut can be dated back to the time of Ramesses II. These rituals involved dancing, singing, and music, as well as the imitation of noises from the underworld, such as the humming of bees and the lowing of bulls. Women played an active role, drinking narcotic potions, lifting their skirts, and seducing men, identifying themselves with the lion goddess, who in mythology became drunk and seduced the creator god. The Mut Temple had a designated "Hall of Drunkenness", as confirmed by inscriptions from the time of Hatshepsut. This ritual is linked to the Myth of the Destruction of Mankind, where the furious lioness goddess was calmed by drinking red-colored beer. Similarly, the Isheru lake in Mut’s temple was referred to as a "vessel of drunkenness", reinforcing the connection between intoxication and divine appeasement.

=== Isheru ===
As the "Eye of Re," Mut took on the leonine traits of Sekhmet, Bastet, and Tefnut and was known as the "Lady of the Isheru." The Isheru, a horseshoe-shaped sacred lake linked to lioness goddesses, may have been inspired by an earlier structure, possibly at Bubastis. The Ipethemtes festival in Thebes marked the start of the Nile inundation, following a period of heat, drought, and disease. This ended with the five epagomenal days, seen as unlucky, during which the angry lioness goddess and her messengers spread destruction.At the festival’s climax, people poured "heavenly dew," a red alcoholic liquid linked to Hapi, over the fields, symbolizing the calming of the Solar Eye and the flood's arrival.

The Mut Temple describes the creation of the Isheru lake, with different texts attributing its excavation to Ra-Atum, Nun, or groups of primeval deities. In some versions, Atum-Ra digs out the Isheru for Mut, surrounding it with cooling waters to calm her fiery nature. Another account has Nun forming the Isheru to soothe Mut’s essence and establish her temple after her she returns to Thebes pregnant with Khonsu. Other texts mention the Primeval Gods constructing the lake under Ra's command. When Mut returns from the desert, Thoth appeases her, and Ra orders the gods to dig a canal in Thebes, extracting its waters to please her. Despite Mut's intense heat, they work with hoes and shovels, and the name "Isheru" comes from the gods' exclamations of suffering as they complete the task.

=== Motherhood ===
Numerous texts refer to Mut as a "mother", and she is occasionally depicted with a divine child on her lap. In Theban mythology, she is also the mother of Khonsu. As the myth goes, Mut, after approaching Thebes and being calmed by drinking from the Isheru, calls for the aged Amun-Ra. Mut then conceives the Khonsu who embodies the reborn sun, and when the time comes, she gives birth to him in her temple.

The birth of Khonsu was celebrated in Thebes in the annual Festival of Renenutet that was held between the end of the month Pharmouthi and the beginning of Pashons. It marked the first day of the harvest season and symbolically linked the birth of child gods to the gathering of new crops. These deities were perceived as providers of fertility and their cyclical rebirth as young solar gods ensured the regeneration of the sun. The festival also incorporated the cult of the reigning monarch, who was identified with the divine child of the local triad, thus reinforcing the legitimacy of royal succession. It became a festival particularly in honor of Khonsu, after whom the month of Pashons was named.

In a poorly preserved text from the Second Pylon in the Mut Temple, Mut arrives in Thebes already pregnant. The story of the Eye of the Sun, also known as the myth of the wandering goddess, is used here as the origin of the name for Khonsu, whose name means "wanderer," as Mut wandered while pregnant with him. The cult of Khonsu's child form, Khonsu-pa-khered, was located in the Mut Temple precinct, scholars have debated his precise cult center, occasionally referred to as "the temple of the birth-bed". In Theban mythology, this temple was believed to be the place where Khonsu was born and raised.

=== Patron of women ===
She serves as a protector of young women, whom they invoke for help in finding a partner and conceiving children. In Ptolemaic times, a special chapel dedicated to this aspect of Mut existed near the Isheru lake, primarily serving a cult for the deified Ptolemaic ancestors. In this temple, a specific form of Mut called Ash-sedjemes ("She who listens to the one who calls her") was worshipped, bearing the title "Mistress of young women."

In Papyrus Insinger 8, women are classified as having either the nature of Mut or of Hathor. In this comparison, Mut embodies the virtuous women while bad women are embodied by Hathor.

== Depictions ==
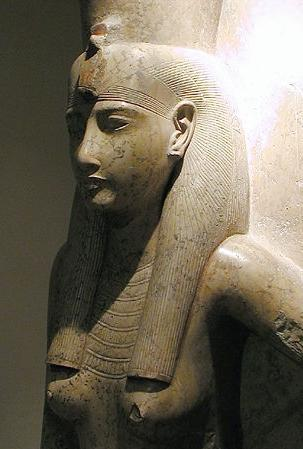
Nineteenth dynasty statue of Mut, part of a double statue, c. 1279–1213 BC, Luxor Museum

In art, Mut was pictured as a woman with the wings of a vulture, holding an ankh, wearing the united crown of Upper and Lower Egypt and a dress of bright red or blue, with the feather of the goddess Ma'at at her feet.

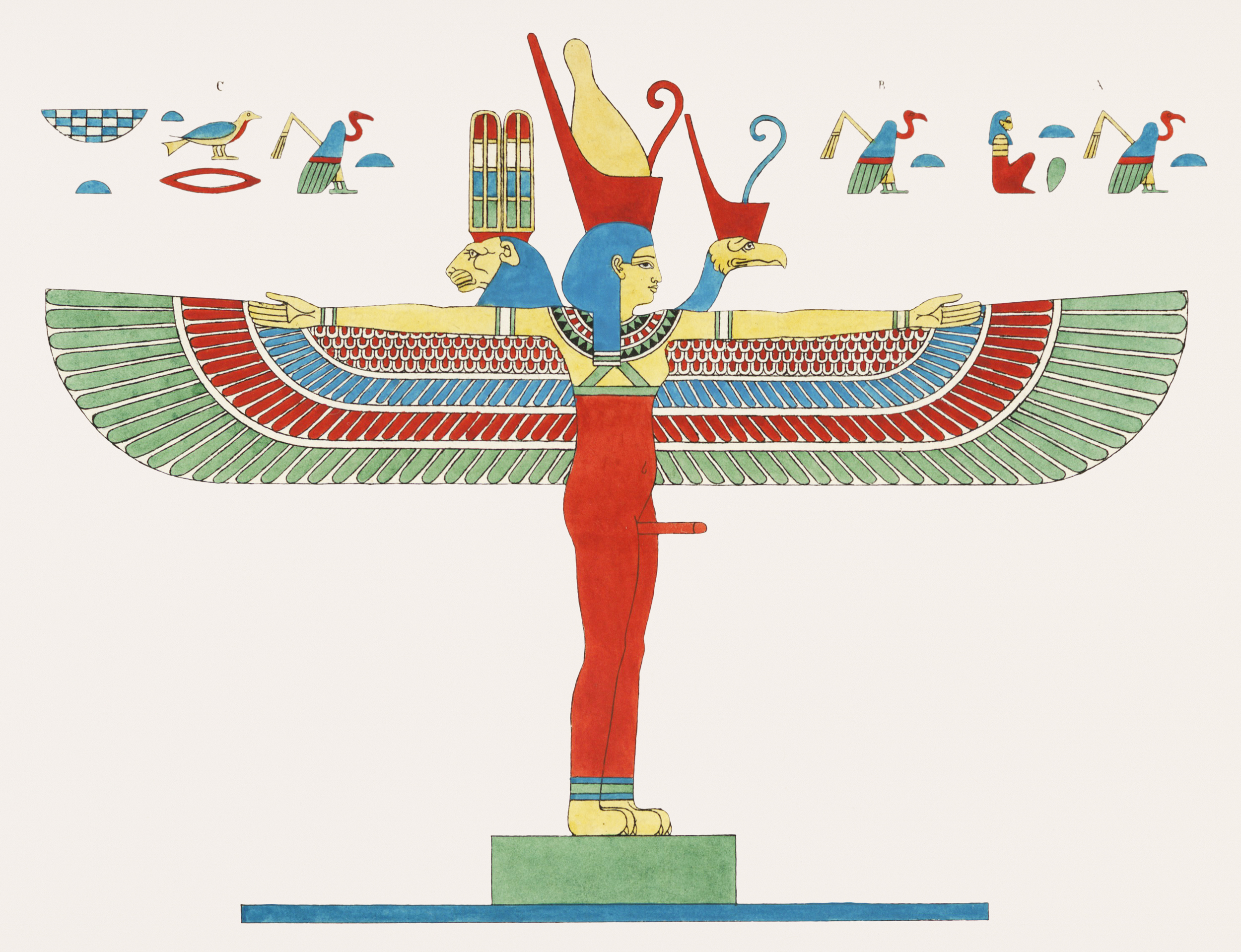
Mut's name could be written with the phallus glyph 𓂸𓏏, and here the goddess herself was even portrayed ithyphallically.

Alternatively, as a result of her assimilations, Mut is sometimes depicted as a cobra, a cat, a cow, or as a lioness as well as the vulture.

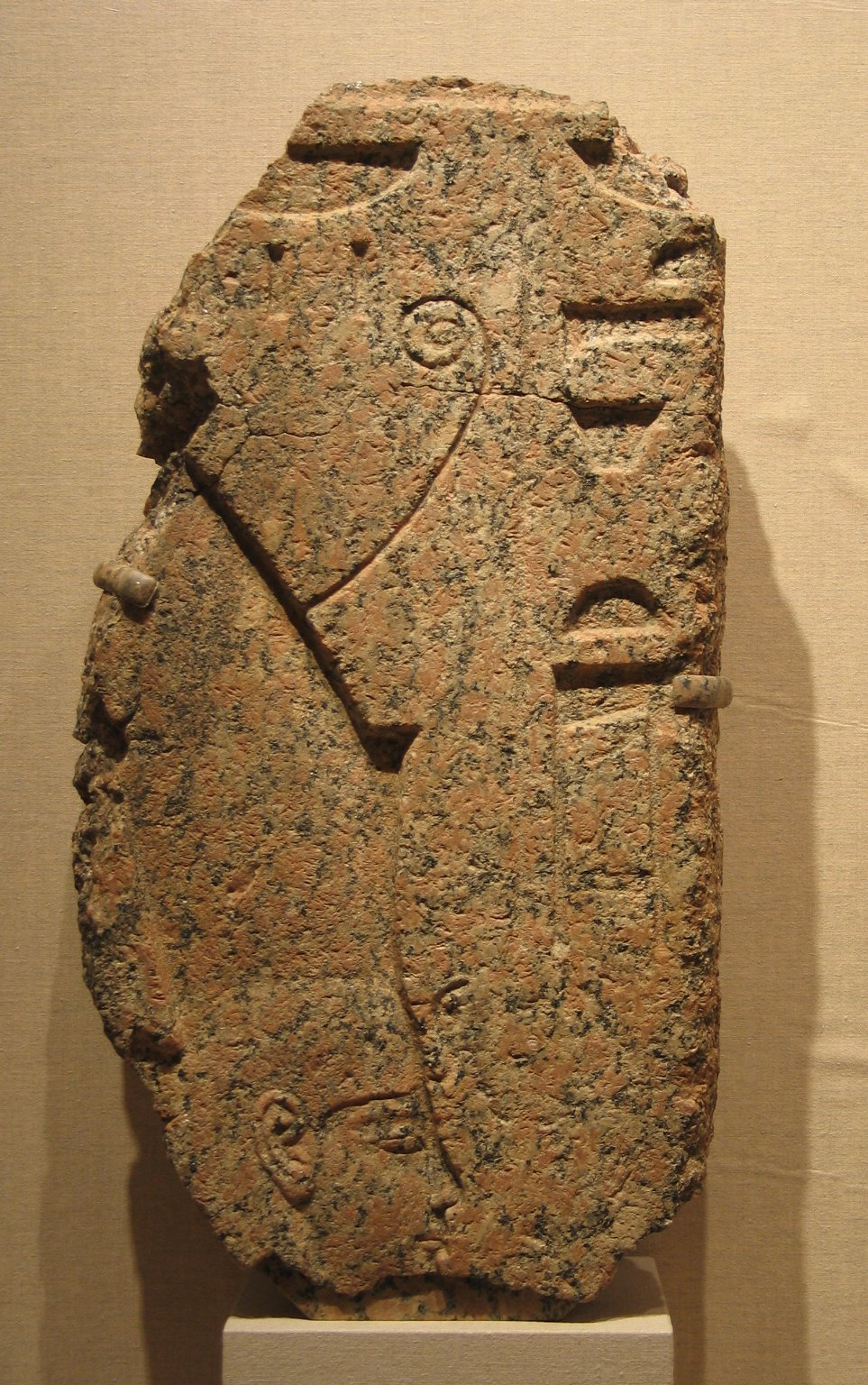
Relief of the Goddess Mut, c. 1336–1213 BC, 79.120, Brooklyn Museum

Before the end of the New Kingdom almost all images of female figures wearing the Double Crown of Upper and Lower Egypt were depictions of the goddess Mut, here labeled "Lady of Heaven, Mistress of All the Gods". The last image on this page shows the goddess's facial features which mark this as a work made sometime between late Eighteenth Dynasty and relatively early in the reign of Ramesses II (reigned c. 1279–1213 BC).

== In Karnak ==
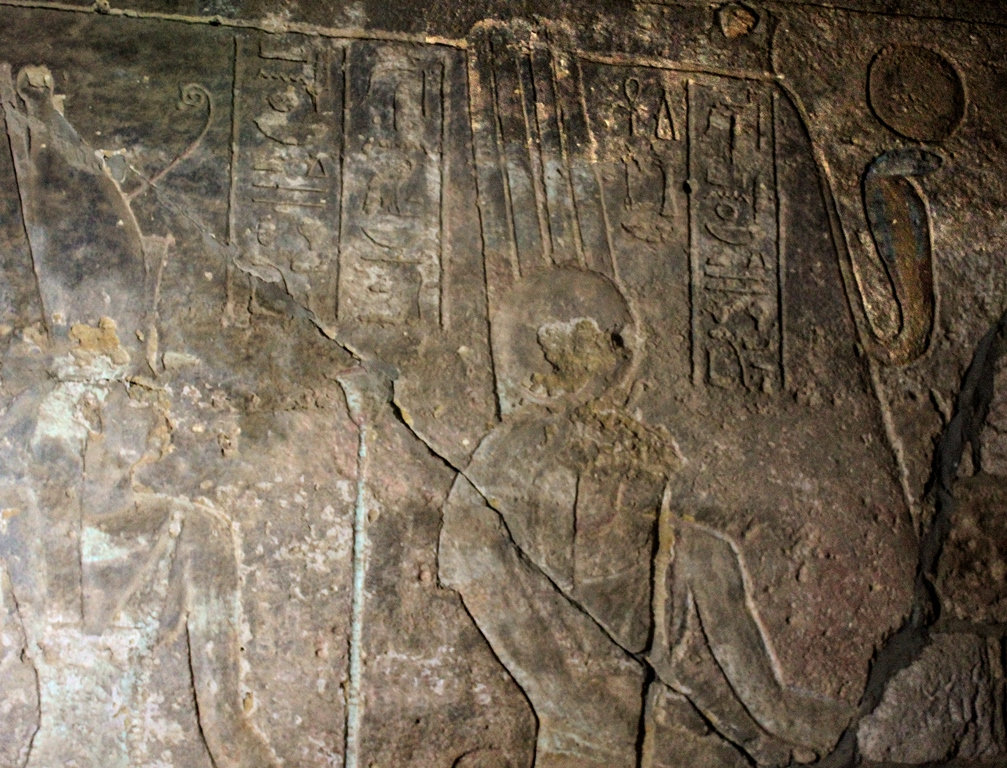
Jebel Barkal Temple of Mut: Amun accompanied by Mut pictured inside Jebel Barkal

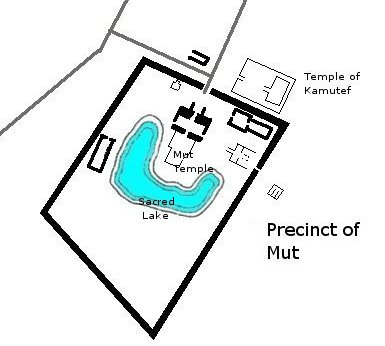
Precinct of Mut at the Karnak temple complex

There are temples dedicated to Mut still standing in modern-day Egypt and Sudan, reflecting her widespread worship. The center of her cult in Sudan became the Mut Temple of Jebel Barkal and in Egypt the temple in Karnak. That temple had the statue that was regarded as an embodiment of her real ka. Her devotions included daily rituals by the pharaoh and her priestesses. Interior reliefs depict scenes of the priestesses, currently the only known remaining example of worship in ancient Egypt that was exclusively administered by women.

Usually the queen served as the chief priestess in the temple rituals. The pharaoh participated also and would become a deity after death. In the case when the pharaoh was female, records of one example indicate that she had her daughter serve as the high priestess in her place. Often priests served in the administration of temples and oracles where priestesses performed the traditional religious rites. These rituals included music and drinking.

The pharaoh Hatshepsut had the ancient temple to Mut at Karnak rebuilt during her rule in the Eighteenth Dynasty. Previous excavators had thought that Amenhotep III had the temple built because of the hundreds of statues found there of Sekhmet that bore his name. However, Hatshepsut, who completed an enormous number of temples and public buildings, had completed the work seventy-five years earlier. She began the custom of depicting Mut with the crown of both Upper and Lower Egypt. It is thought that Amenhotep III removed most signs of Hatshepsut, while taking credit for the projects she had built.

Hatshepsut was a pharaoh who brought Mut to the fore again in the Egyptian pantheon, identifying strongly with the goddess. She stated that she was a descendant of Mut. She also associated herself with the image of Sekhmet, as the more aggressive aspect of the goddess, having served as a very successful warrior during the early portion of her reign as pharaoh.

Later in the same dynasty, Akhenaten suppressed the worship of Mut as well as the other deities when he promoted the monotheistic worship of his sun god, Aten. Tutankhamun later re-established her worship and his successors continued to associate themselves with Mut afterward.

Ramesses II added more work on the Mut temple during the nineteenth dynasty, as well as rebuilding an earlier temple in the same area, rededicating it to Amun and himself. He placed it so that people would have to pass his temple on their way to that of Mut.

Kushite pharaohs expanded the Mut temple and modified the Ramesses temple for use as the shrine of the celebrated birth of Amun and Khonsu, trying to integrate themselves into divine succession. They also installed their own priestesses among the ranks of the priestesses who officiated at the temple of Mut.

The Greek Ptolemaic dynasty added its own decorations and priestesses at the temple as well and used the authority of Mut to emphasize their own interests.

Later, the Roman emperor Tiberius rebuilt the site after a severe flood and his successors supported the temple until it fell into disuse, sometime around the third century AD. Later Roman officials used the stones from the temple for their own building projects, often without altering the images carved upon them.

== Personal piety ==
In the wake of Akhenaten's revolution, and the subsequent restoration of traditional beliefs and practices, the emphasis in personal piety moved towards greater reliance on divine, rather than human, protection for the individual. During the reign of Rameses II a follower of the goddess Mut donated all his property to her temple and recorded in his tomb:

And he [Kiki] found Mut at the head of the gods, Fate and fortune in her hand, Lifetime and breath of life are hers to command ... I have not chosen a protector among men. I have not sought myself a protector among the great ... My heart is filled with my mistress. I have no fear of anyone. I spend the night in quiet sleep, because I have a protector.
