= The Inman Diaries =

Opera by Thomas Oboe Lee

The Inman Diaries is an opera composed by Thomas Oboe Lee with a libretto by Jesse J. Martin. This portrayal of Arthur Crew Inman's life, as seen through his own writings was originally adapted from Camera Obscura, a play by Lorenzo DeStefano (http://www.cameraobscuraplay.com) and The Inman Diary: A Public and Private Confession, edited by Professor Daniel Aaron. From 1919 until he committed suicide in 1963, he created his 155 volume diary which contained over 17 million words, making it one of the longest recorded diaries in the English language. He was an obsessive recluse who was committed to having his diaries published to establish his immortality. He would pay people to “talk” to him so that he could make a record of their stories. He was particularly interested in young women and was known to be sexually involved with some of these “talkers”. The opera is based on a 44-year period of his life, adapted so that the decades are condensed and time loses its relevancy.

== Roles ==
- Arthur Crew Inman (tenor)
- Evelyn Yates Inman (mezzo-soprano)
- Otto Ten Broek (baritone)
- Flossie Bert (soprano)
- Billy Minor (tenor)
- Therese Raleigh (mezzo-soprano)
- Dr. Cyrus Pike (baritone)
- Kathy O’Connor (soprano)
- Ella James (soprano)

== Synopsis ==
=== Act I ===
- Scene 1: December 5, 1963 a gunshot is heard. A Greek chorus reads the obituary of Arthur Crew Inman. Arthur ponders the importance of his diaries and his legacy as a writer.
- Scene 2: Otto Ten Broek, Arthur’s mechanic and valet, announces the arrival of Flossie Bert. She has responded to Arthur’s advertisement for people to read to him and tell him about their lives. Flossie describes a train trip to Florida. Otto interrupts and Flossie, embarrassed, swiftly excuses herself. Arthur is enraged and threatens to fire Otto.
- Journal Entry: A quartet comments about Arthur’s self–proclaimed ability to recognize greatness in people. Arthur elaborates on his conflicted opinions about Adolf Hitler and his contempt for U.S. President Franklin D. Roosevelt.
- Scene 3: Evelyn Yates Inman meets with her husband as she prepares for her daily errands. Arthur complains about his migraines and a sleepless night, and reprimands her for not getting a new advertisement placed in The Boston Globe. They argue about Evelyn’s exceptionally close friendship with Arthur’s osteopath, Dr. Cyrus Pike. Dr. Pike enters and escorts Evelyn to her car.
- Scene 4: Arthur is infuriated by Evelyn’s lack of character and believes that he never should have married her. Outside the apartment, Evelyn tells Dr. Pike about the home she has purchased in Acton, and they dream about a future together.
- Scenes 5 & 6: Arthur happily remembers the previous evening with Therese, a 16-year-old girl. Otto announces her arrival. Therese picks up where she left off and tells Arthur about her first orgasm. Therese catches Otto eavesdropping and quickly leaves. Arthur fires Otto instantly. Otto, knowing Arthur’s history with his female “talkers”, threatens to report Arthur to the authorities.
- Journal Entry: A trio sings satirically about Roosevelt’s New Deal, incorporating the words of the 23rd Psalm.
- Scene 7: Billy Minor, a handyman and close friend of Arthur, comes to fix Arthur’s wheelchair. Arthur expresses his concern about Otto’s threat and about his wife’s affair; he also states that he is contemplating suicide. Dr. Pike makes a house call to Arthur. He tells Arthur that he is only in an emotional relationship with Evelyn because Arthur cannot provide one due to his medical conditions. Dr. Pike also tells him that he is considering retiring. Arthur is distressed about losing his medical provider and his closest friend.
- Scene 8: Arthur writes in his diary about people’s actions being different from their true thoughts. He vows he will win Evelyn back. Evelyn arrives and announces that Dr. Pike is dying of bone cancer. Arthur faces Evelyn with his suspicions, and she eventually confesses to the affair. Arthur accuses her of immorality and feels betrayed. Evelyn calls him a hypocrite and storms out.

=== Act 2 ===
- Scene 1: Arthur and Evelyn are in uproar from receiving notice of their eviction from Garrison Hall. Arthur suspects that Otto reported him to the Watch and Ward Society for acts of indecency. Dr. Pike helps the couple figure out a plan to ameliorate the situation.
- Journal Entry: Arthur writes about the Prudential Center’s construction and its impact on his mental health.
- Scene 2: Kathy O’Conner, who is in her mid-twenties, drops by to visit Arthur before going to work. Arthur tells her that he wants to adopt her because he is afraid that she will leave him like the others. Kathy promises never to abandon him.
- Scene 3: Dr. Pike and Evelyn return with good news from their meeting with the Watch and Ward Society. Relieved, Arthur thanks Dr. Pike.
- Journal Entry: A quartet reflects on Arthur’s southern heritage. Arthur writes fondly of Ella James, an African-American woman who comes to read to him frequently.
- Scene 4: Ella tells Arthur about her childhood. She expresses her opinions about the racial hypocrisy in the United States and her belief that a new movement is within reach. She leaves, pleased but feisty. Arthur ponders whether he could benefit from being with such a strong woman.
- Scene 5: Arthur reads a letter from Billy stating that he has left his wife and moved out of town to be with another woman. Arthur feels abandoned and hurt and wants his friend back.
- Scene 6: A quartet recites a passage from Arthur’s diary about a plane flying into the Empire State Building. Dr. Pike has died, and Arthur reads a letter from him expressing his gratitude for allowing Evelyn to help him through the end stages of his illness. Arthur then reads a letter from Evelyn stating that she is leaving him to move to her house in Acton. Arthur is weary as he contemplates the future.
- Scene 7: A quartet ponders whether Arthur will be remembered for his diaries. Arthur now wishes to be found guilty at his trial. The noise from the building construction becomes unbearable to his fragile state of nerves. Arthur raises a gun to his head and the opera ends the same way it began.

== Production history ==
World Premiere: September 14, 2007, Boston, Massachusetts, commissioned and produced by 'Intermezzo: the New England Chamber Opera Series'.
