= List of books on diaries and journals =

This article is intended to be a chronological list of books on diaries and journals, including how-to, self-help and discussions of the diary or journal as a genre of literature.

For a list of fictional diaries, please see the list of fictional diaries. For a list of diarists, please see list of diarists. For a list of diaries notable for high word-count or duration, please see list of longest diaries.

Table of books on diaries and journals.
Author	Title	Publisher	Date	Notes
Lowell, Amy; Omori, Annie; & Doi, Kochi	Diaries of court ladies of old Japan	Houghton Mifflin	1920	Includes the Sarashina diary, the diary of Murasaki Shikibu, and the diary of Izumi Shikibu.
Forbes, Harriette M.	New England Diaries: A descriptive catalog of diaries, orderly books and sea journals	Privately printed	1923	A substantial work of over 440 pages; brief descriptions only.
Thomas, William S.	American revolutionary diaries. Also journals, narratives, autobiographies, reminiscences and personal memoirs	The New York Historical Society	1923	"Considerably more than three hundred titles are presented…" (p. 1) 46 pages, very brief descriptions.
Ponsonby, Arthur	English Diaries: A review of English diaries from the sixteenth to the twentieth century with an introduction on diary writing	Methuen & Co. Ltd	1923	120 English diarists included.
Ponsonby, Arthur	More English Diaries: Further reviews of diaries from the sixteenth to the nineteenth century with an introduction on diary reading	Methuen & Co. Ltd	1927	37 English diarists included.
Ponsonby, Arthur	Scottish and Irish Diaries: From the sixteenth to the nineteenth century	Methuen & Co. Ltd	1927	28 diarists.
Fyfe, James Gabriel	Scottish diaries and memoirs 1550–1746	Eneas Mackay	1928	Over 460 pages, includes 29 diarists and The Lyon in Mourning (1745/46), "a remarkable collection of journals, narratives, and other documents written, or communicated orally, by men and women who participated in the Jacobite rising of 1745" (p. 436).
Ponsonby, Arthur	British diarists	Ernest Benn Limited	1930	80-page booklet in the "Benn's Sixpenny Library" series (no. 70)
Field, Joanna	A Life of One's Own	J. P. Tarcher, Inc.	1934	Joanna Field is a pseudonym of Marion Milner.
D'Oyley, Elizabeth	English diaries	Edward Arnold & Co.	1935	Includes Charles Wriothesley, Henry Machyn, Anthony À Wood, Samuel Pepys, Henry Teonge, John Evelyn, Elizabeth Byrom, James Boswell's Journal of a tour to the Hebrides, Fanny Burney, Dorothy Wordsworth, Sir Walter Scott, & Captain Robert Scott.
Ponsonby, Arthur	The little torch: Quotations from diaries of the past for every day of the year	George Routledge & Sons Ltd.	1938	366 quotations from 222 diarists.
Aitken, James	English diaries of the 16th, 17th and 18th centuries	Pelican Books	1941	155 pages, 19 diarists.
Aitken, James	English diaries of the 19th century 1800–1850	Pelican Books	1944	160 pages, 22 diarists.
Matthews, William	American diaries: an annotated bibliography of American diaries written prior to the year 1861	University of California Press	1945	
O'Brien, Kate	English diaries and journals	W Collins	1947	48 pages. O'Brien states "…the best English diaries have been written by bores" (p. 7). Includes several illustrations and portraits.
Spalding, Philip Anthony	Self Harvest: A study of diaries and the diarist	Independent Press Ltd	1949	112 pages, includes 91 British diarists.
Matthews, William	British diaries: An annotated bibliography of British diaries written between 1442 and 1942	University of California Press	1950	
Waite, Vincent	English diaries and journals	A. Wheaton & Co,. Ltd.	1952	Includes 20 diarists; vague chapter headings such as "A king"; "A country doctor"; "A woman novelist"; "A poet's sister" etc. Also includes the fictional work The diary of a nobody (1892) by George and Weedon Grossmith.
Dunaway, Philip & Evans, Mel	A treasury of the world's great diaries	Doubleday & Company, Inc.	1957	
Fothergill, Robert A.	Private chronicles: A study of English diaries	Oxford University Press	1974	
Progoff, Ira	At a Journal Workshop: The basic text and guide for using the Intensive Journal	Dialog House Library	1975	
Batts, John Stuart	British manuscript diaries of the nineteenth century: An annotated listing	Rowman & Littlefield	1976	
Rainer, Tristine	The New Diary: How to use a journal for self-guidance and expanded creativity	Jeremy P. Tarcher/Putnam	1978	
Capacchione, Lucia	The Creative Journal: The art of finding yourself	Ohio University/Swallow Press	1979	
Lifshin, Lyn	Ariadne's Thread: A collection of contemporary women's journals	Harper & Row	1982	
Arksey, Laura; Pries, Nancy; & Reed, Marcia	American diaries: An annotated bibliography of published American diaries and journals. Volume 1: Diaries written from 1492 to 1844	Gale Research Company	1983	
Mallon, Thomas	A Book of One's Own: People and their diaries	Ticknor & Fields	1984	Over 125 diarists listed, almost all from Europe and North America.
Kagle, Steven	Early nineteenth century American diary literature	Twayne Publishers	1986	
Arksey, Laura; Pries, Nancy; & Reed, Marcia	American diaries: An annotated bibliography of published American diaries and journals. Volume 2: Diaries written from 1845 to 1980	Gale Research Company	1987	
Vivian, Frances	Letts keep a diary–A exhibition of the history of diary keeping in Great Britain from 16th–20th century in commemoration of 175 years of diary publishing by Letts	Charles Letts & Co Ltd	1987	
Fulwiler, Toby	The Journal Book	Heinemann	1987	A collection of essays on using journals in K12 classrooms.
Havlice, Patricia Pate	And so to bed. A bibliography of diaries published in English	The Scarecrow Press, Inc.	1987	
Blodgett, Harriet	Centuries of Female Days: Englishwomen's private diaries	Rutgers University Press	1988	
Blythe, Ronald	The pleasures of diaries: Four centuries of private writing	Pantheon Books	1989	
Brett, Simon	The Faber book of diaries	Faber & Faber	1989	
Adams, Kathleen	Journal to the Self: Twenty-two paths to personal growth	Hachette	1990	
Blodgett, Harriet	Capacious Hold-All: An anthology of Englishwomen's diary writings	University Press of Virginia	1992	
Stevens, Carla	A book of your own: Keeping a diary or journal	Clarion Books	1993	
Schiwy, Marlene A.	A Voice of Her Own: Women and the journal-writing journey	Simon & Schuster	1996	
Price, Dan	How to Make a Journal of Your Life	Ten Speed Press	1999	
Taylor, Irene; & Taylor, Alan	The assassin's cloak: An anthology of the world's greatest diaries	Canongate Books	2000	
Williams, Kate; et al.	Great Diaries: The world's most remarkable diaries, journals, notebooks, and letters	DK Penguin Random House	2000	
Bender, Sheila	Keeping a journal you love	North Light Books	2001	
Jolly, Margaretta	Encyclopedia of life writing: Autobiographical and biographical forms. Volume 1 A–K	Fitzroy Dearborn Publishers	2001	
Jolly, Margaretta	Encyclopedia of life writing: Autobiographical and biographical forms. Volume 2 L–Z	Fitzroy Dearborn Publishers	2001	
Johnson, Alexandra	Leaving a Trace: On keeping a journal	Back Bay Books	2002	
Diehn, Gwen	The Decorated Page: Journals, scrapbooks & albums made simply beautiful	Lark Books	2002	
Alaszewski, Andy	Using Diaries for Social Research	SAGE Publications	2006	
Kominars, Sheppard B.	Write for Life: Healing body, mind, and spirit through journal writing	Cleveland Clinic Press	2007	
Lejeune, Philippe	On diary	University of Hawai'i Press	2009	
Johnson, Alexandra	A brief history of diaries: From Pepys to blogs	Hesperus Press Limited	2011	
Kempthorne, Charley	Narrative Journaling: 28 days to writing more or less happily for the rest of your life	The LifeStory Institute	2014	
Bayley, Sally	The Private Life of the Diary: From Pepys to tweets	Unbound	2016	
Henderson, Desirée	How to read a diary: Critical contexts and interpretive strategies for 21st-century readers	Routledge	2019	
Ben-Amos, Batsheva; & Ben-Amos, Dan	The diary: The epic of everyday life	Indiana University Press	2020	

== See also ==
- Diary
- Intensive Journal Method
- List of diarists
- List of fictional diaries
- Literary technique
- Notetaking
- Othergates - a series of market guides that was published in the 1980s
