= Robert Shields (diarist) =

American diarist, minister and teacher (1918–2007)

Robert William Shields
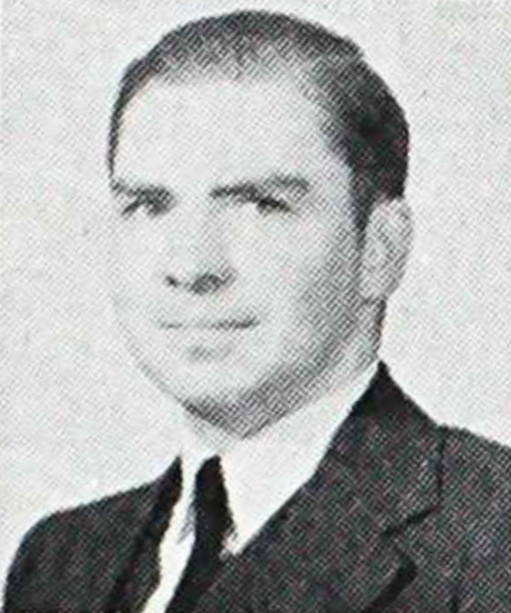
- Shields in 1942
- Born: May 17, 1918; Seymour, Indiana, U.S.
- Died: October 15, 2007 (aged 89); Dayton, Washington, U.S.
- Occupations: Minister; high school teacher
- Known for: 37.5-million-word diary
- Spouse: Grace Augusta Hotson
- Children: 3

Robert William Shields (May 17, 1918 – October 15, 2007) was an American minister and high school English teacher best known for writing a diary of 37.5 million words, which chronicled every five minutes of his life from 1972 until a stroke disabled him in 1997. Shields's diary, which filled 91 boxes, was longer than those kept by the journalist Edward Robb Ellis (21 million words) and the poet Arthur Crew Inman (17 million words), and 30 times longer than that of Samuel Pepys (1.25 million words).

== Biography and personal life ==
Robert William Shields was born on May 17, 1918. Shields graduated from Franklin College. He eventually attended several theological schools and became a Protestant minister. Shields served several churches before becoming a high-school English teacher in South Dakota for a time.

Shields was married to Grace Augusta Hotson, with whom he had three daughters: Klara, Cornelia, and Heidi.

He died from a heart attack at his home in Dayton, Washington, on October 15, 2007, just over 10 years after the stroke that ended his work on his diary. He was 89 years old. His wife died on April 17, 2024.

== Diary ==
Believing that discontinuing his diary would be like "turning off my life", he spent four hours a day in the office, on his back porch, in his underwear, recording his body temperature, blood pressure, medications, describing his urination and bowel movements, and slept no more than four hours at a time so he could describe his dreams. The New York Times summarized the journal as being about anything "from changing light bulbs to pondering God to visiting the bathroom". He also left behind samples of his nose hair for future study. After his stroke in 1997, Shields tried to continue the diary by having his wife write what he told her to write, but she lacked the compulsion and energy to do so and stopped shortly afterward.

Shields's self-described "uninhibited", "spontaneous" work was astonishing in its mundaneness, and now fills 91 cartons in the collections of Washington State University, to which he donated the work in 1999. In a May 2000 interview he said "I've written 1200 poems and at least five of 'em are good." He also claimed to have written the story base for Elvis Presley's film Love Me Tender based on the Reno Gang of Seymour, Indiana, where Shields was born. Copies of the manuscript are at the Kansas State Historical Society's E. P. Lamborn collection. Shields based his manuscript on John Reno's 1879 autobiography, although there is some uncertainty over the authorship of the Reno autobiography, with Shields himself having acted as editor for the only known published copy.

The journal for which he became known was not the first he had tried to keep; he had tried to write one at age 17 to chronicle a romantic relationship, but abandoned it after losing interest in the project.

His voluminous diary brought Shields fame and television appearances including on Primetime Live and The Oprah Winfrey Show.

== Diary excerpts ==
Reporting at the time of his death stated that under the terms of the donation of his diary to Washington State University, the diary may not be read or subjected to an exact word count until 50 years from his death (i.e. in 2057). Shields said that it may not be read until both he and his wife died; she died in 2024 and the university began cataloging the collection that year. However, many excerpts have appeared, including the following:

July 25, 1993
7 am: "I cleaned out the tub and scraped my feet with my fingernails to remove layers of dead skin."
7.05 am: "Passed a large, firm stool, and a pint of urine. Used five sheets of paper."
April 18, 1994
6:30–6:35: "I put in the oven two Stouffer's macaroni and cheese at 350°."
6:35–6:50: "I was at the keyboard of the IBM Wheelwriter making entries for the diary."
6.50–7.30: "I ate the Stouffer's macaroni and cheese and Cornelia ate the other one. Grace decided she didn't want one."
7.30–7.35: "We changed the light over the back stoop since the bulb had burnt out."
April 30, 1994
11:00–11:30: "I picked over parts of Newsweek and Time and Harvard magazine and reread them while I ate about a dozen leftover fish sticks. (Cold.)"
August 21, 1994
2:25–2:35: "I checked on whether our county tax payment had been received. It had."
August 13, 1995
8.45 am: "I shaved twice with the Gillette Sensor blade [and] shaved my neck behind both ears, and crossways of my cheeks, too."

== See also ==
- Morris Villarroel
