= Villarroel =

Villarroel is a surname. It can be found in Bolivia, Spain, Chile, and Venezuela. Notable people with the surname include:

- Antoni de Villarroel (1656–1726), Spanish military commander
- Carmina Villarroel (born 1975), Filipino actress, television host, and model
- Catherine Villarroel, Bolivian fashion model and beauty queen
- Diego de Torres Villarroel (1693–1770), Spanish writer, poet, dramatist, doctor, mathematician, priest, professor of the University of Salamanca
- Gualberto Villarroel (1908–1946), Bolivian military officer and President of Bolivia
- Luis Villarroel (born 1981), Venezuelan diver
- Mario Enrique Villarroel Lander (born 1947), Venezuelan lawyer
- Moisés Villarroel (Bolivian footballer), Bolivian football midfielder
- Moisés Villarroel (Chilean footballer) (born 1976), Chilean football manager and midfielder
- Morris Villarroel (born 1978 or 1979), Spanish professor of animal psychology and lifelogger
- Néstor Guzmán Villarroel (born 1964), Bolivian politician and trade unionist
- Verónica Villarroel, Chilean soprano

== See also ==
- Gualberto Villarroel Province, province in the La Paz Department, Bolivia
- Puerto Villarroel, locality in the Cochabamba Department in central Bolivia
- Villaroel, a given surname
- Villarroelia, extinct genus of litopterns
