= A. C. Benson =

English essayist and poet (1862–1925)

A. C. Benson FRSL
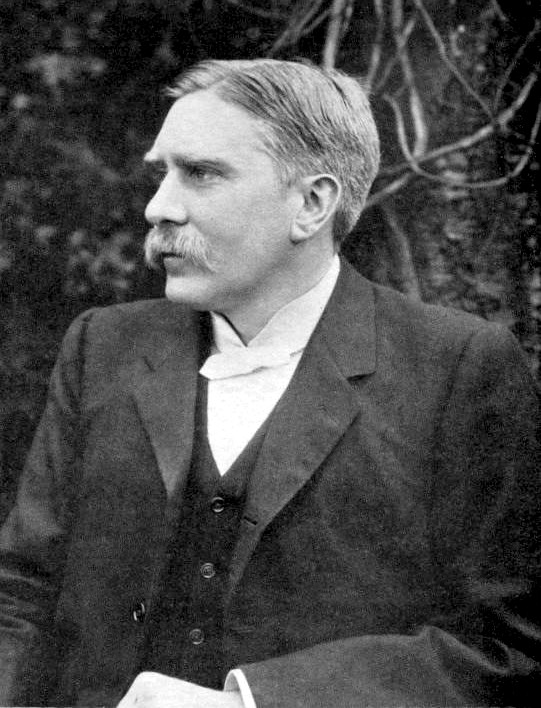
- Benson c. 1899

28th Master of Magdalene College, Cambridge
- In office 1915–1925
- Preceded by: Stuart Alexander Donaldson
- Succeeded by: Allen Beville Ramsay

Personal details
- Born: Arthur Christopher Benson; 24 April 1862 Crowthorne, Berkshire, England
- Died: 17 June 1925 (aged 63) Cambridge, England
- Parents: Edward White Benson (father); Mary Benson (mother)
- Relatives: E. F. Benson (brother); Robert Hugh Benson (brother); Margaret Benson (sister); Henry Sidgwick (uncle)
- Education: Temple Grove School; Eton College
- Alma mater: King's College, Cambridge
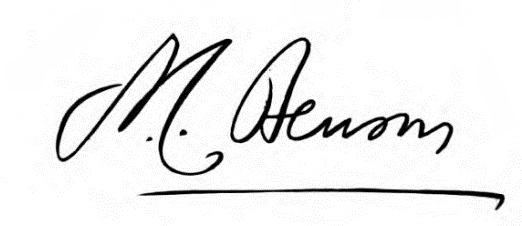
- Signature

Arthur Christopher Benson, FRSL (24 April 1862 – 17 June 1925) was an English essayist, poet and academic, who served as the 28th Master of Magdalene College, Cambridge. He wrote the lyrics of Edward Elgar's Coronation Ode, including the words of the patriotic song "Land of Hope and Glory" (1902). His literary criticism, poems, and volumes of essays were highly regarded. He was also noted as an author of ghost stories. According to contemporary critics and historians, he is thought to have been homosexual; homosexual themes often present themselves very subtly in his work. Benson's diary is one of the longest diaries in the English language.

== Early life and family ==
Benson was born on 24 April 1862 at Wellington College, Berkshire, as one of six children of Edward White Benson, the first headmaster of the college, who was Archbishop of Canterbury from 1883 to 1896. His mother Mary (née Sidgwick) was a sister of the philosopher Henry Sidgwick.

Benson's literary family included his brothers Edward Frederic Benson, best remembered for his Mapp and Lucia novels, and Robert Hugh Benson, a priest of the Church of England before converting to Roman Catholicism, who wrote many popular novels. Their sister Margaret Benson was an artist, author, and amateur Egyptologist.

Though exceptionally accomplished, the Benson family met tragic times: a son and daughter died young, while another daughter and Arthur himself suffered from a mental condition that may have been bipolar disorder, apparently inherited from their father. None of the children married.

Despite his illness, Benson became a distinguished academic and a prolific author. From ages 10 to 21, he lived in cathedral closes, first at Lincoln where his father was Chancellor of Lincoln Cathedral and subsequently at Truro, where his father was the first Bishop of Truro. He retained a love of church music and ceremony.

In 1874, he won a scholarship to Eton from Temple Grove School, a preparatory school in East Sheen. In 1881, he went up to King's College, Cambridge, where he was a scholar—King's College had closed scholarships for which only Etonians were eligible—and achieved first-class honours in the Classical tripos in 1884.

== Career ==
From 1885 to 1903, Benson taught at Eton, but he returned to Cambridge in 1904 as a Fellow of Magdalene College to lecture in English Literature. He became president of the college (the Master's deputy) in 1912, and he was Master of Magdalene (head of the college) from December 1915 until his death in 1925. From 1906, he was a governor of Gresham's School.

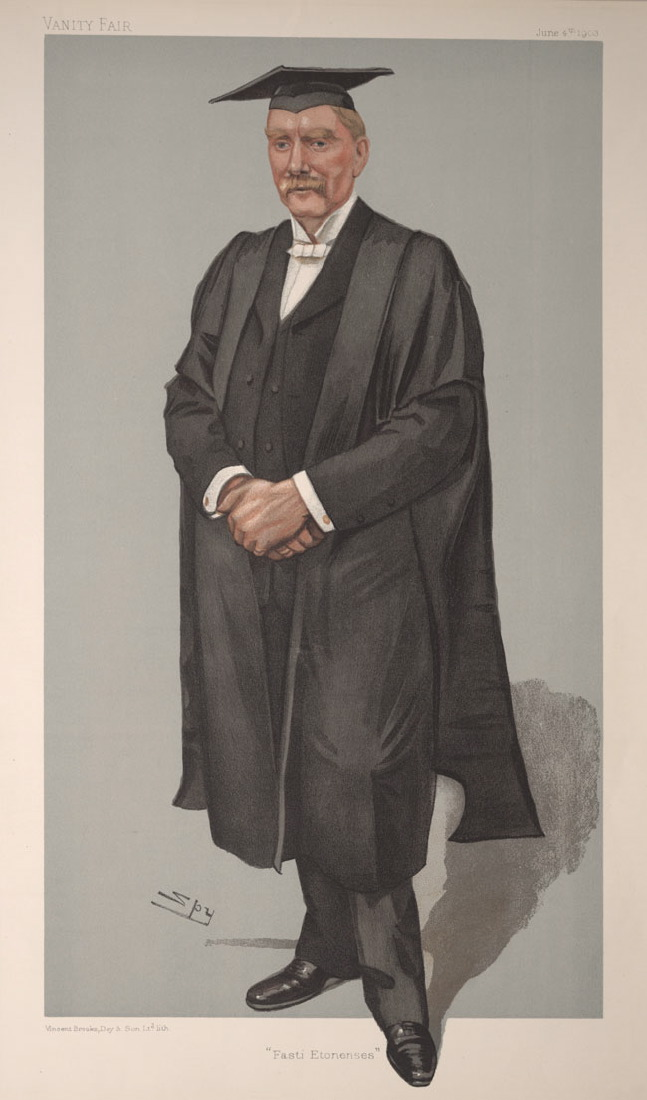
"Fasti Etonenses", Benson caricatured by Spy for Vanity Fair, 1903.

The modern development of Magdalene was shaped by Benson, as a generous benefactor with a marked impact on the appearance of the college grounds; he appears in at least 20 inscriptions around the college. In 1930, the new Benson Court was named after him.

Benson worked with Lord Esher in editing the correspondence of Queen Victoria, which appeared in 1907. His poems and essay volumes, such as From a College Window and The Upton Letters (essays in the form of letters) were famous in his time; and he left one of the longest diaries ever written, some four million words. His literary criticisms of Dante Gabriel Rossetti, Edward FitzGerald, Walter Pater and John Ruskin rank among his best work.

Benson wrote the lyrics of the Coronation Ode, set to music by Edward Elgar for the coronation of Edward VII and Alexandra in 1902. It has as its finale one of Britain's best-known patriotic songs, "Land of Hope and Glory".

== Ghost stories ==
Like his brothers Edward Frederic and Robert Hugh, Benson was noted as an author of ghost stories. The bulk of them, in two volumes, The Hill of Trouble and Other Stories (1903) and The Isles of Sunset (1904), were written for his pupils as moral allegories. After Arthur's death, Fred Benson found a collection of unpublished ghost stories and included two in a book, Basil Netherby (1927). The title story was renamed "House at Treheale" and the volume completed by a long piece, "The Uttermost Farthing", but the fate of the other stories is unknown.

Paul the Minstrel and Other Stories (1911, reprinted 1977) collects the contents of The Hill of Trouble and Other Stories and The Isles of Sunset. Nine of Arthur's ghost stories are included in David Stuart Davies (ed.), The Temple of Death: The Ghost Stories of A. C. & R. H. Benson (Wordsworth, 2007), together with seven by his brother R. H. Benson, while nine of Arthur's and ten of Robert's appear in Ghosts in the House (Ash-Tree, 1996) – the contents of the joint collections are similar but not identical.

== Views ==
In The Schoolmaster, Benson summarised his views on education after 18 years' experience at Eton. He criticised a trend he found prevalent in English public schools, to "make the boys good and to make them healthy" to the detriment of their intellectual development.

He was a Fellow of the Royal Society of Literature, and founded the Benson Medal in 1916 "in respect of meritorious works in poetry, fiction, history and belles lettres".

== Sexuality ==
Benson is widely believed, by historians, to have been homosexual, although he appears to have never had sexual relations with a man. In one of his diary entries about his brother Robert Hugh Benson, Benson wrote "He has no love for the feminine; and I think the same is true of me".

== Death ==
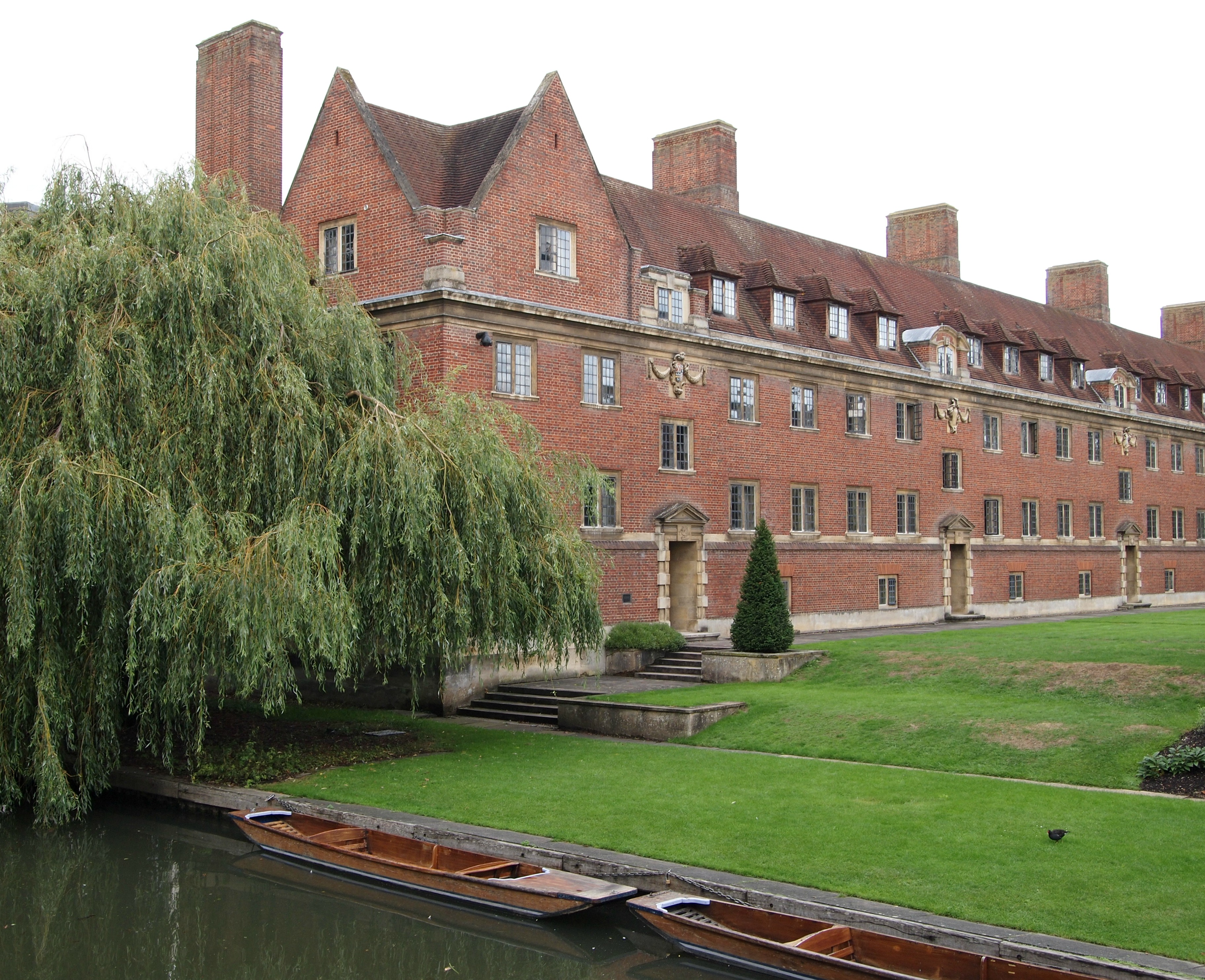
Benson Court (the Lutyens Building) at Magdalene College, Cambridge

A. C. Benson died of a cardiac arrest at Magdalene on 17 June 1925, and was buried at St Giles's Cemetery in Cambridge.

== Critical reception ==
Horror critic R. S. Hadji included Benson's Basil Netherby on a list of "unjustly neglected" horror books.

Sir Arthur Quiller-Couch included Benson's poem "The Phoenix" in the first and second editions of The Oxford Book of English Verse.

In 2025 The Guardian's reviewer, Vernon Bogdanor, was unimpressed with Benson's edited diaries.

== Works ==
"The Phoenix"

By feathers green, across Casbeen

The pilgrims track the Phoenix flown,

By gems he strew'd in waste and wood,

And jewell'd plumes at random thrown.

Till wandering far, by moon and star,

They stand beside the fruitful pyre,

Where breaking bright with sanguine light

The impulsive bird forgets his sire.

Those ashes shine like ruby wine,

Like bag of Tyrian murex spilt,

The claw, the jowl of the flying fowl

Are with the glorious anguish gilt.

So rare the light, so rich the sight,

Those pilgrim men, on profit bent,

Drop hands and eyes and merchandise,

And are with gazing most content.

- Memoirs of Arthur Hamilton, 1886
- Men of Might: Studies of Great Characters, with H. F. W. Tatham, 1892
- Le Cahier Jaune: Poems, 1892
- Poems, 1893
- Genealogy of the Family of Benson of Banger House and Northwoods, in the Parish of Ripon and Chapelry of Pateley Bridge, 1894
- Lyrics, 1895
- Lord Vyet & Other Poems, 1898
- Ode in Memory of the Rt. Honble. William Ewart Gladstone, 1898
- Thomas Gray, 1895
- Essays, 1896.
- Fasti Etonenses: A Biographical History of Eton, 1899
- The Professor: and Other Poems, 1900
- The Schoolmaster, 1902
- The Hill of Trouble and Other Stories, 1903
- The Isles of Sunset, 1904
- (as editor) Ionica by William Cory, 3rd edition, 1905
- Peace: and Other Poems, 1905
- The Upton Letters, 1905
- The Gate of Death: A Diary, 1906
- From a College Window, 1906
- Monnow: An Ode, 1906
- Rossetti, 1906
- Walter Pater, 1906
- The Thread of Gold, 1907
- The House of Quiet: An Autobiography, 1907
- The Altar Fire, 1907
- The Letters of One, a Study in Limitations, 1907
- Beside Still Waters, 1908
- At Large, 1908
- Tennyson, 1908
- Until the Evening, 1909
- The Poems of A. C. Benson, 1909
- The Child of the Dawn, 1911
- Paul the Minstrel and Other Stories, 1911
- The Leaves of the Tree: Studies in Biography, 1911
- Ruskin: A Study in Personality, 1911
- The Letters of Queen Victoria, 1907
- Thy Rod and Thy Staff, 1912
- The Beauty of Life: Being Selections from the Writings of Arthur Christopher Benson, 1912
- Joyous Gard, 1913
- The Silent Isle, 1913
- Along the Road, 1913
- Where No Fear Was: A Book About Fear, 1914
- The Orchard Pavilion, 1914
- Escape and Other Essays, 1916
- Meanwhile; A Packet of War Letters, 1916
- Father Payne, 1917
- Life and Letters of Maggie Benson, 1920
- Watersprings, 1920
- Hugh: Memoirs of a Brother, 1920
- The Reed of Pan; English Renderings of Greek Epigrams and Lyrics, 1922
- The Trefoil: Wellington College, Lincoln, and Truro, 1923
- Magdalene College, Cambridge: A Little View of Its Buildings and History, 1923
- Selected Poems, 1924
- Chris Gascoyne; An Experiment in Solitude, from the Diaries of John Trevor, 1924
- Everybody's Book of the Queen's Dolls' House, 1924
- Memories and Friends, 1924
- Edward Fitzgerald, 1925
- The House of Menerdue, 1925
- Rambles and Reflections, 1926
- Basil Netherby, 1926
- The Diary of Arthur Christopher Benson, 1926

=== Reviews of Benson's poetry ===
- "The Poetry of Mr. A. C. Benson", Sewanee Review, Volume 14 (Sewanee: University of the South, 1906), 110–111, 405–421.
- "Poets All", The Speaker, Volume 15, 13 February 1897 (London), 196
- "Mr. Benson's Poems", The Literary World, Volume 48, 3 November 1893 (London: James Clarke & Co.), 329
- "Selected Poetry of Arthur Christopher Benson" (1862–1925)
- "A Literary Causerie" in The Speaker, Volume 15, 13 March 1897 (London), 299

Academic offices
Preceded by Stuart Alexander Donaldson	Master of Magdalene College, Cambridge; 1915–1925	Succeeded by Allen Beville Ramsay
