= A. C. Benson's diary =

English diary written by A.C. Benson

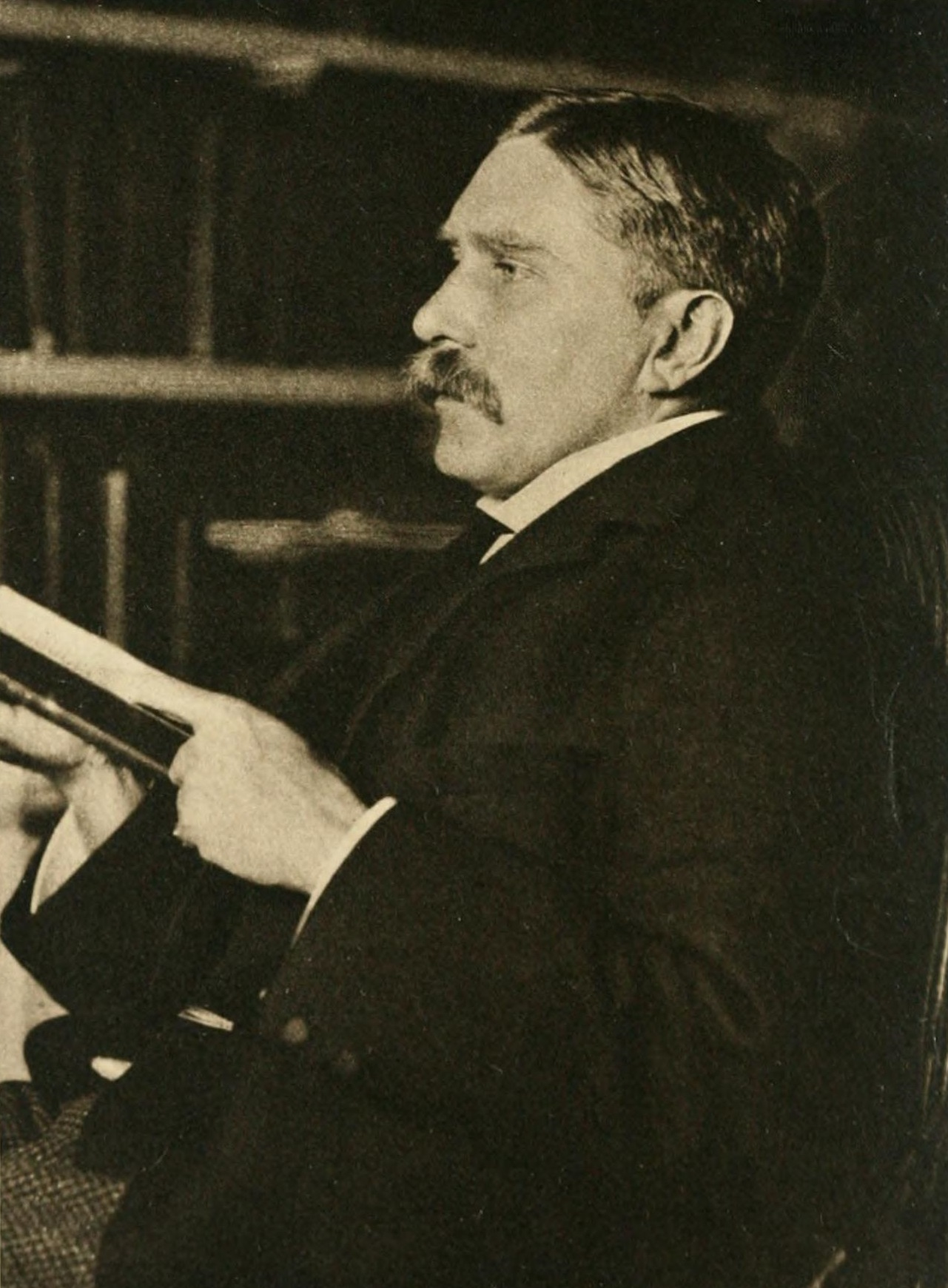
Benson in 1898

The diary of A. C. Benson (1862–1925), an English author and academic, was written from 1887 until the year of his death and consists of 180 manuscript volumes, or nearly five million words, making it one of the longest diaries in the English language.

Although Benson was known as a quintessentially English establishment figure with a chivalrous public persona and whose literary work, according to himself, was aimed at "a feminine tea-party kind of audience", the contents of his diary have been described as "frank" and "mordant", with numerous criticisms and unfavourable descriptions of notable figures of his time. Benson wrote extensively in his diary about his homosexual infatuations, although it is likely he never engaged in sexual intercourse. Publicly an Anglican, he also revealed a latent religious scepticism in his personal writings. Scholar Raymond-Jean Frontain observed that Benson "did not begin keeping his voluminous diary until the year his father died, as if Edward’s passing freed him to begin exploring his inner life at last."

The original manuscript volumes of the diary are at Magdalene College, Cambridge, where Benson served for ten years as master.

== Publication history ==
Benson knew that his diary would be published in some form after his death and left the task of editing its contents to his friend Percy Lubbock. Benson's will stipulated that the material be locked away for fifty years, but Lubbock published a selection of excerpts from the diary, the 320-page The Diary of Arthur Christopher Benson, just one year after the author's death. In addition to the excerpts, the book also includes an 11-page introduction written by Lubbock and eight photographs. A shorter selection, Edwardian Excursions: From the Diaries of A. C. Benson, 1898-1904, was edited by Benson's biographer David Newsome and released in 1981.

A more extensive selection was released in 2025, edited by historians Eamon Duffy and Ronald Hyam. The Benson Diary: I: 1885-1906; II: 1907-1925 comprises about one-twelfth of the diary (350,000 words) and includes extensive footnotes, a 74-page introduction, and new illustrations.

Biographer Peter Parker expressed his wish for the entire diary to become digitally available.

== Reception and analysis ==
"He wrote very freely in his diary, and even very recklessly, but in a particular strain, not with all his moods — and not quite unconsciously either, so that the revelation of himself is not always to be accepted without demur. Enough, I place the diary, clearing it as well as I can of the thousand things I read into it, beside the image of the writer as he lives in a memory that is full of him; and now, as best may be, I note where his own pages fail to give a portrait that satisfies a friend."

— Percy Lubbock in 1926.

Upon the release of the Lubbock selection, a reviewer from The Nation and Athenaeum commented that "even those who find his works the triumph of mediocrity will agree that the diary is a fascinating document, if only because it enables them to seek out and attempt to define the curious flaw which made A. C. Benson in books so much less interesting than A. C. Benson in life." The Spectator's Stephen Gwynn commended Lubbock's "task of selection", particularly because "the diarist — to judge by what is given — always wrote well but had no passages of inspiration", adding: "ironically, this posthumous book ensures [Benson's] survival." In a similar tone, a reviewer from The Saturday Review wrote that "Arthur Christopher Benson was a failure in literature: Mr. Lubbock has enabled him to achieve posthumously his one success", calling the selection "a triumph of editing" that "entitles Mr. Lubbock to a position among the very few who have successfully practised the hardest kind of biography, that in which the subject is made to speak for himself." According to The Independent's Ernest Boyd, "a more uninteresting life it would be difficult to imagine, yet, a more illuminating comment upon a certain side of English society and English education it would be impossible to find." Writing for The New York Times, Percy A. Hutchinson described Benson as "one of the lesser, very lesser, figures of later Victorian letters” — a man who knew "that in the world of enduring letters he was a failure." In spite of this, Hutchinson considered the diary a work of “extraordinary range, astonishing in the amount of detail recorded, and amazingly vivid almost throughout.”

Simon Goldhill read the diary while researching for his book A Very Queer Family Indeed: Sex, Religion, and the Bensons in Victorian Britain (2016). At the time, he was only the fourth person ever to read the work in its entirety — the other three were Lubbock, Newsome, and a master of Magdalene. Goldhill described it as “both a performance and a discussion of the awkward and constantly shifting boundary between frankness and giving oneself away.”

The release of the Duffy and Hyam selection in 2025 brought renewed interest in the diary. The Spectator's Philip Hensher opined the selection placed Benson in the "pantheon of great English diarists" and praised the diary's "dedication to the utterly insignificant" and the "vividness" of its prose, a contrast to Benson's "astonishingly bland" published work. Similarly, D. J. Taylor of The Times Literary Supplement felt that the "unique" diary "puts [Benson] into the Pepys class: the highly attractive yet self-interrogating and sometimes vulnerable personality who can understand the world he chronicles because he sees it from the inside." Writing for Literary Review, Piers Brendon found that "contrary to all expectations, the vapid sentimentalist produced a work of lasting interest and importance" and further praised Benson's "sharp eye for detail, a gift for pithy description and an irreverent attitude towards the eminent."

The Times's Peter Parker called the diary "Benson’s true literary legacy" and added that "as a portrait of an age, seen from a particular ivory tower, the diary is invaluable; as a study of someone in flight from his own nature, it is both moving and compelling." The Critic's Andrew Doyle pondered that "by all the usual metrics, [Benson] was a success, but, in the books published during his lifetime, we sense a man who is continually holding back. It was only in his diaries that he found the freedom to write unfettered, and the results are fresh and compelling. In these private pages, he snagged his golden fish." Doyle also condemned Vernon Bogdanor's review of the diary for The Guardian — Bogdanor stated the work is "a monument of misplaced scholarship" that only creates a connection with people who feel "misplaced nostalgia for a supposedly golden age of civilised living [...] that fortunately is long gone."
