= Edward Robb Ellis =

American journalist (1911–1998)

Edward Robb Ellis (February 22, 1911 – September 7, 1998) was an American diarist and journalist. During his career he worked in New Orleans, Chicago and New York City. Ellis began his diary in 1927 as a teenager and wrote almost every day for more than 70 years, filling a volume each year.

He was believed to be the most prolific diarist in the history of American letters, writing an estimated 22 million words. He was listed in the Guinness Book of World Records as having the world's longest diary, until the journals of Robert Shields of Dayton, Washington, with 37.5 million words and crammed with minutes of daily living, were revealed in 1994.

Ellis authored books on the Great Depression and New York City, as well as a study of suicide. According to his book A Diary of the Century, his diaries were bequeathed to the Fales Library at New York University after his death.

== Biography ==
Edward Robb Ellis was born in 1911 in Kewanee, Illinois, where he grew up. He began writing his diary in 1927 as part of a bet with two other young men as to who could keep up a journal the longest.

Ellis was determined to be a reporter from an early age. He started out writing feature stories for his hometown's Star Courier newspaper, and attended the journalism program at the University of Missouri. In 1934 he took a job as a professional reporter for the New Orleans Associated Press office. In this position he covered the events of the Great Depression and the political career of Huey Long. After two years in New Orleans, he moved to Oklahoma City and became a journalist for the Oklahoma City Times, covering New Deal offices and programs. As part of this position he reported on the Oklahoma Federal Symphony Orchestra, which was funded by the Works Progress Administration. Through this assignment, he met and fell in love with the principal violinist, Leatha Sparlin. They married in 1939 and moved to Peoria, Illinois, where he worked for the Journal-Transcript. The couple then moved to Chicago where he worked for the Daily News. Their daughter, Sandra Gail Ellis, was born on December 28, 1942.

Shortly after Sandra's birth, Ellis became aware that a previous diagnosis of a hernia was incorrect. He anticipated being drafted and consequently sought a commission in the navy. He was unable to receive one as he was underweight. As a result, he joined the navy and reported to training on November 7, 1942. With diary keeping prohibited in the armed forces, he changed its format from private entries to letters to his wife and daughter.

Ellis detested boot camp, and upon finishing he was appointed editor of the navy hospital newspaper called The Bedside Examiner. He used his position to publish editorials promoting enlisted people's rights as well as critiques of war. After basic training he was stationed in Okinawa where he continued to publish a newspaper, this time explicitly to improve the sailors' morale. Four months later the war ended and he returned to the United States. His wife requested a divorce, which he granted the following month; he returned to Chicago to work at the Daily News.

Ellis did not fit in under the new management at the newspaper in Chicago and soon left for New York to work at the World Telegram. Ellis loved New York City deeply and would remain there for the rest of his life, eventually meeting and marrying Ruth Kraus with whom he had an exceptionally happy marriage. After 15 years at the World Telegram, Ellis quit after a disagreement with a city editor. He used his time unemployed to write several books, often with Ruth's help. Four of these books were published in his lifetime.

Ruth died suddenly of a heart attack in 1965. Ellis went on to have several extended romances, one with June Morgan and another with Selma Pezaro. Although Ellis was not a strong presence in his daughter's childhood, he and Sandy became close in her adulthood, writing numerous letters and challenging each other intellectually. He also forged mentoring relationships with other diarists, usually through interviews and by publishing parts of the diary in A Diary of the Century.

Ellis was a contributor to Diarist's Journal, a quarterly newspaper by, for and about diarists, published by Ed Gildea of Lansford, Pennsylvania. His reputation as a diarist led Letts of London to hire him as a consultant, and to create a diary modeled on his recommendations called "The Ellis Diary."

Ellis' apartment on the third floor on W. 21st St. in Manhattan was filled with words—both his own and from other collected books and articles. It was difficult to move about, with books stacked randomly in high piles. Ellis would laugh at his own lack of organizing skills, and was happy to serve guests tea and talk about various subjects.

Throughout his career as a reporter, Ellis interviewed numerous celebrities and public figures including Eleanor Roosevelt, Irving Berlin, Grace Kelly and Herbert Hoover. The diary records his impressions of these famous personalities. Ellis was equally fascinated by the experiences and perceptions of ordinary people. He prided himself on his curiosity and eagerness to learn and considered himself what Shakespeare called "a snapper-up of unconsidered trifles." The diary is a collection of those trifles and an attempt by its author, Pete Hamill writes in the introduction to A Diary of the Century, "to freeze time" and reflect on himself and humanity.

Ellis continued to write until his death from emphysema in 1998.

== Bibliography ==
- Traitor Within: Our Suicide Problem (with George Allen). Doubleday, 1961.
- The Epic of New York City: A Narrative History. Coward-McCann, 1966.
- A Nation in Torment: The Great American Depression, 1929-1939. Perigee Trade, 1972.
- Echoes of Distant Thunder: Life in the United States, 1914-1918. Coward-McCann, 1975.
- A Diary of the Century: Tales by America's Greatest Diarist. Kodansha, 1995.
