= Stuart Alexander Donaldson =

British academic administrator (1854–1915)

Stuart Alexander Donaldson (born 4 December 1854 in Sydney, Australia, died 29 October 1915) was a schoolmaster, clergyman and Master of Magdalene College, Cambridge.

== Life ==
Donaldson was born in Sydney, the second oldest son of Sir Stuart Alexander Donaldson, the first Premier of the Colony of New South Wales.

After education at Eton College Donaldson went to Trinity College, Cambridge as a scholar in 1873, graduating with first class honours in Classics in 1877. From 1878 to 1904 he served as a master at Eton, during this time being ordained as deacon in 1884 and priest in 1885. While a schoolmaster he published, with Edward Lyttelton, Pontes, a book of elementary Latin exercises.

In 1904 he was elected as the Master of Magdalene College, Cambridge, a position he held until his death in 1915, and was awarded the degrees of Bachelor of Divinity in 1905 and Doctor of Divinity in 1910. He served as Vice-Chancellor of the University of Cambridge from 1912 to 1913.

Donaldson married Lady Albinia Frederica Hobart-Hampden, granddaughter of Augustus Edward Hobart-Hampden, the 6th Earl of Buckinghamshire in 1900.

== Publications ==
- Pontes. Elementary Latin Exercises (with E. Lyttelton), 1884
- Science and Faith, 1890
- The Obligation of the Church to Foreign Mission Work generally among Non-Christian Peoples, (Pan-Anglican Papers), 1908
- Church Life and Thought in North Africa, A.D. 200, Cambridge University Press, 1909

Academic offices
Preceded by Latimer Neville, 6th Baron Braybrooke	Master of Magdalene College Cambridge; 1904–1915	Succeeded by A. C. Benson
Preceded by Robert Forsyth Scott	Vice-Chancellor of the University of Cambridge; 1912–1913	Succeeded by Montague Rhodes James
