= Coronation Ode =

Work composed by Edward Elgar with words by A. C. Benson (1902)

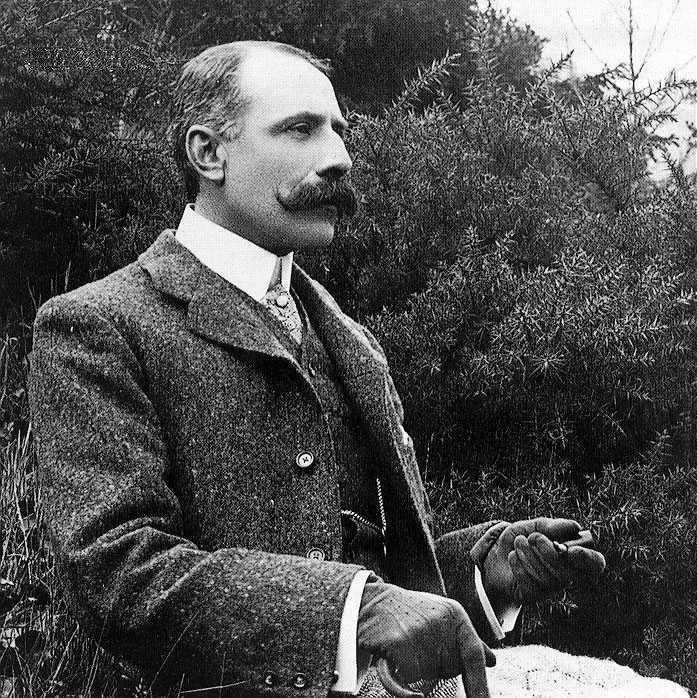
Edward Elgar, c. 1900

Coronation Ode, Op. 44 is a work composed by Edward Elgar for soprano, alto, tenor and bass soloists, chorus and orchestra, with words by A. C. Benson.

It was written for the Coronation of King Edward VII and Alexandra of Denmark in 1902, and dedicated "by Special Permission, to His Most Gracious Majesty King Edward VII", but the Coronation was postponed due to the King's sudden illness. The first performance was not until 2 October 1902 at the Sheffield Festival, by the Sheffield Choir, soloists Agnes Nicholls, Muriel Foster, John Coates and David Ffrangcon Davies, with Elgar conducting. The parts are inscribed "Composed for the Grand Opera Syndicate, for the state performance at Covent Garden on June 30th, 1902" and the first London performance was at Covent Garden on 26 October 1902. The first performance attended by the King and Queen was almost a year later in London on 25 June 1903, at a concert organised by Lady Maud Warrender.

== Structure ==
The ode has six parts:

1. Introduction: "Crown the King", for soloists and chorus
2. (a) "The Queen", for chorus
  (b) "Daughter of ancient Kings", for chorus
3. "Britain, ask of thyself", for bass soloist and men's (tenor and bass) chorus
4. (a) "Hark, upon the hallowed air" for soprano and tenor soloists
  (b) "Only let the heart be pure", for soprano, contralto, tenor and bass soloists
5. "Peace, gentle peace", for soprano, contralto, tenor and bass soloists and unaccompanied chorus
6. Finale: "Land of hope and glory", contralto soloist, with chorus

In section V, the chorus performs unaccompanied, but the section is introduced by pairs of clarinets, bassoons, and horns plus strings; those instruments also accompany the solo quartet in the middle of the section.

== History ==
Queen Victoria died in January 1901 and preparations for the coronation of her son King Edward VII were soon under way. Late that year the Covent Garden Grand Opera Syndicate commissioned Elgar to write a work to be premiered at a Royal gala on the eve of the Coronation which was planned for June of the following year. Elgar himself invited A. C. Benson (perhaps at the instance of the King) to provide the libretto: Benson was a musician as well as a writer, and the collaboration was close and successful.

The King suggested to Elgar that words could be provided to the Trio section of the first Pomp and Circumstance March, which he liked: Elgar took up the King's suggestion and asked Benson to provide words so that the tune could form the climax of the Ode.

Elgar began writing in February 1902 and by the end of March he had finished the vocal score, which at that time consisted of parts I, III, IV, V and VI. Benson then realised that there needed to be a song referring to Queen Alexandra, and added Daughter of ancient Kings which Elgar reluctantly placed after Crown the King, as he had wanted to follow that with "Britain, ask of thyself". In June of that year, Elgar prepared the Ode for a State performance, with a choir rehearsal in Sheffield followed by an orchestra (with military band) rehearsal in London at Covent Carden. He took Melba, Kirkby Lunn, Ben Davies and David Ffrangcon-Davies through their solo parts. But the planned performance on 30 June never took place, for the Coronation, planned for 26 June, was cancelled only two days before due to the King suddenly being taken ill with appendicitis, which required an operation.

The Ode was not performed in the royal presence until a year later, to mark the anniversary of the Coronation. It was the last item in a gala concert, in the presence of the King and Queen and the Prince and Princess of Wales, on 25 June 1903, at the Royal Albert Hall. It was organised by Lady Maud Warrender in aid of the Union Jack Club. The chorus was the 400-strong choir of the Leeds Choral Union, with the augmented Queen's Hall Orchestra conducted by Sir Henry Wood, and the Band of the Coldstream Guards. The Ode was conducted by Elgar. who was afterwards presented to the King. The soloists were Mme Albani, Clara Butt, Ben Davies and Andrew Black. The concert opened with Elgar's arrangement of God Save the King for singers and orchestra.

The publishers, Boosey & Co., realising its popularity, asked Elgar to revise Land of hope and glory so it could be produced as a separate song, and this was in fact sung by Clara Butt with great success at a "Coronation Concert" a week before the Ode was first performed in London.

The Ode was used again for the coronation of King George V and Queen Mary in 1911. The chorus for the Danish-born Queen Alexandra Daughter of ancient Kings in 1902 was unsuitable to refer to Queen Mary, and was replaced by a new chorus True Queen of British homes and hearts (called simply The Queen) with lyric again by Arthur Benson. The other (ominous) change was the omission of Peace, gentle Peace which had been the preface to Land of hope and glory.

There is a part for a military band. This was desired by Elgar: 'Edward made the tonic key E-flat: he wanted to add a military band to the orchestra and organ.' This is shown in the first edition of the complete score as a two-stave condensed score above which are written two staves for the band percussion. The band plays on occasions in sections I, III, and VI, only, including fanfares which are also cued in the orchestra parts where necessary.

The work was published for five royal occasions:

- the Coronation of King Edward VII in 1902 – "Daughter of ancient Kings", personal to Queen Alexandra, was only used for this occasion – used parts I, II (b), III, IV (a & b), V and VI
- the Coronation of King George V in 1911 – "The Queen" replaced "Daughter of ancient Kings", and the prayer "Peace, gentle peace" was omitted – used parts I, II (a), III, IV (a & b) and VI
- the Jubilee Edition for King George V in 1935 used parts I, II (a), IV (a & b) and VI only
- the Coronation of King George VI in 1937 used parts I, II (a), IV (b) and VI only
- the Coronation of Queen Elizabeth II in 1953 – "Crown the King" became "Crown the Queen" – used parts I, II (a & b), III, IV (a & b) and VI only

== Lyrics ==
=== "Crown the King" ===
I – "Crown the King" – Introduction Soloists and Chorus

Crown the King with Life!
Through our thankful state
Let the cries of hate
Die in joy away;
Cease ye sounds of strife!
Lord of Life, we pray,
Crown the King with Life!

Crown the King with Might!
Let the King be strong,
Hating guile and wrong,
He that scorneth pride.
Fearing truth and right,
Feareth nought beside;
Crown the King with Might!

Crown the King with Peace,
Peace that suffers long,
Peace that maketh strong,
Peace with kindly wealth,
As the years increase,
Nurse of joy and health;
Crown the King with Peace!

Crown the King with Love!
To his land most dear
He shall bend to hear
Ev'ry pleading call;
Loving God above,
With a heart for all;
Crown the King with Love!

Crown the King with Faith!
God, the King of Kings,
Ruleth earthly things;
God of great and small,
Lord of Life and Death,
God above us all!
Crown the King with Faith!

God shall save the King,
God shall make him great,
God shall guard the state;
All that hearts can pray,
All that lips can sing,
God shall hear today;

Crown the King with Life
with Might, with Peace, with Love, with Faith!

God shall save the King,
God shall make him great,
God shall guard the state;
All that hearts can pray,
All that lips can sing,
God shall hear today;
God shall save the King!

=== (a) "The Queen" (b) "Daughter of ancient Kings" ===
II – (a) "The Queen" – Chorus

True Queen of British homes and hearts
Of guileless faith and sterling worth,
We yield you ere today departs,
The proudest, purest crown on earth!

We love you well for England's sake,
True you shall prove, as you have proved;
The years that come shall only make
Your name more honoured, more belov'd.

Oh kind and wise, the humblest heart
That beats in all your realms today
Knows well that it can claim its part
In all you hope, in all you pray.

II – (b) "Daughter of ancient Kings" – Chorus "A Greeting to Her Gracious Majesty, Queen Alexandra"

Daughter of ancient Kings,
Mother of Kings to be,
Gift that the bright wind bore on his sparkling wings,
Over the Northern sea!

Nothing so sweet he brings,
Nothing so fair to see,
Purest, stateliest, daughter of ancient Kings,
Mother of Kings to be!

=== "Britain, ask of thyself" ===
III "Britain, ask of thyself" – Solo Bass and Chorus (Tenor and Bass)

Britain, ask of thyself, and see that thy sons be strong,
See that thy sons be strong,
Strong to arise and go,
See that thy sons be strong,

See that thy navies speed, to the sound of the battle-song;
Then, when the winds are up, and the shuddering bulwarks reel,
Smite, the mountainous wave, and scatter the flying foam,
Big with the battle-thunder that echoeth load, loud and long;

Britain, ask of thyself, and see that thy sons be strong,
See that thy sons be strong,
Strong to arise and go,
If ever the war-trump peal;

See that thy squadrons haste, when loos'd are the hounds of hell;
Then shall the eye flash fire, and the valourous heart grow light,
Under the drifting smoke, and the scream of the flying shell,
When the hillside hisses with death, and never a foe in sight.
Britain, ask of thyself, and see that thy sons be strong.

So shall thou rest in peace, enthron'd in thine island home.
So shall thou rest in peace,
Enthron'd in thine island home,
So shall thou rest in peace, enthron'd in thine island home.

Britain, ask of thyself,
Britain, ask of thyself, see that thy sons be strong,
Strong to arise, arise and go, see that thy sons be strong.
See that thy sons be strong,
Strong to arise and go, if ever the war-trump peal!

=== (a) "Hark, upon the hallowed air" (b) "Only let the heart be pure" ===
IV (a) "Hark, upon the hallowed air" – Soli (Soprano and Tenor)

Tenor
Hark, upon the hallow'd air,
Spirits pure of sight and sense,
Hov'ring visions, rich and fair,
Lend their radiant influence!
Airy powr's of Earth and Sky
Bless our meet solemnity.

Soprano
Music, sweetest child of heav'n,
At thy touch the heart is free,
Ancient wrongs by thee forgiv'n,
Cares uplifted, heal'd by thee,
Listen smiling, borne along
In the sacred, sacred tide of song.

Tenor
Music, music of the poet's heart!
Widening yet the echoes roll;
Fiery secrets, wing'd by art,
Light the lonely list'ning soul,
Till the aching silence rings
With the beat of heav'nly wings.

Soprano
Magic web of woven hues,
Tender shadow, linked line,
Sweet mysterious avenues
Opening out to Light Divine!
Painter-poet, thou canst teach
More than frail and falt'ring speech.

IV (b) "Only let the heart be pure" – Quartet (S.A.T.B.)

Only let the heart be pure,
Pure in steadfast innocence,
Stainless honour, strong and sure,
Stem the ardent tide of sense!

So shall Wisdom, one with Truth,
Keep undimm'd the fires of youth,
Strong to conquer, strong to bless,
Britain, Heaven hath made thee great!

Courage knit with gentleness,
Best befits thy sober state.
As the golden days increase,
Crown thy victories with peace!

The last line, previously "Crown your victories with peace!", was changed for the 1911 edition.

=== "Peace, gentle peace" ===
V "Peace, gentle peace" – Soli (S.A.T.B.) and Chorus unaccompanied

Peace, gentle Peace, who, smiling through thy tears,
Returnest, when the sounds of war are dumb ...
Replenishing the bruised and broken earth,
And lifting motherly her shattered form,
When comest thou, Our brethren, long for thee
Thou dost restore the darken'd light of home,
Give back the father to his children's arms
Thou driest tenderly the mourner's tears,
And all thy face is lit with holy light
Our earth is fain for thee! Return and come.

=== "Land of hope and glory" ===
VI – "Land of hope and glory" – Finale (Contralto Solo and Tutti)

Solo
Land of hope and glory,
Mother of the free,
How shall we extol thee,
who are born of thee?
Truth and Right and Freedom,
each a holy gem,
Stars of solemn brightness,
weave thy diadem.

Chorus
'Tho thy way be darken'd,
still in splendour drest,
As the star that trembles
o'er the liquid West.
Thron'd amid the billows,
thron'd inviolate,
Thou hast reign'd victorious,
thou hast smil'd at fate.

Soloists and Chorus
Land of hope and glory,
Fortress of the free,
How shall we extol thee?
praise thee, honour thee?
Hark! a mighty nation
maketh glad reply;
Lo, our lips are thankful;
lo, our hearts are high!
Hearts in hope uplifted,
loyal lips that sing;
Strong in Faith and Freedom,
we have crowned our King!

The third line, previously "How may we extol thee," was changed for the 1911 edition.

== Recordings ==
- Teresa Cahill (soprano), Anne Collins (contralto), Anthony Rolfe Johnson (tenor), Royal Scottish National Orchestra and Choir, Sir Alexander Gibson (conductor). Chandos CHAN 6574
- Dame Felicity Lott (soprano), Alfreda Hodgson (contralto), Richard Morton (tenor), Stephen Roberts (bass), Cambridge University Musical Society, Choir of King's College, Cambridge, Band of the Royal Military School of Music, Kneller Hall conducted by Sir Philip Ledger, recorded at Chapel of King's College, Cambridge, February 1977 EMI CLASSICS 5 85148 2
