= Ernest Achey Loftus =

British soldier, teacher and diarist

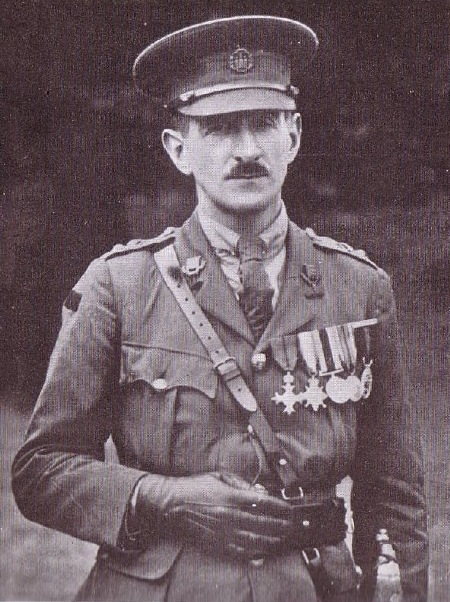
- Lieutenant-Colonel Ernest Loftus
- Born: January 1884; Kingston upon Hull, Yorkshire, England
- Died: 7 July 1987 (aged 103); Zimbabwe
- Military career
- Allegiance: United Kingdom
- Branch: British Army
- Service years: 1914–1918
- Rank: Lieutenant Colonel
- Unit: Essex Regiment
- Conflicts: World War I
- Awards: Commander of the British Empire; Officer of the British Empire; Territorial Decoration

Lieutenant Colonel Ernest Achey Loftus CBE OBE TD (January 1884 − 7 July 1987) was a British soldier, diarist and former headmaster of Barking Abbey School. He is noted as the world’s most durable diarist, having kept a detailed journal, with brief periods of omission, over 91 years, from 1896 to 1987.

== Early life ==
Loftus was a Yorkshireman, born at Hull, January 1884. Educated at York and Trinity College Dublin, he came to Essex to teach in 1906, as fourth form master at Palmer’s Boys’ School, Grays. Joining the Territorial Force in 1910, Loftus was commissioned in 1912. He subsequently served as a captain at Gallipoli, Egypt and in France with the Essex Regiment.

== Teaching career ==
Following the Great War 1914–1918, Loftus returned to education and held the headmastership of Barking Abbey School from 1922 to 1949. Here he published various books, including ‘Education and the Citizen’ (1935) and a family record of his wife’s antecedents – ‘The Descendants of Maxmilian Cole’ (1938). She was Elsie, daughter of a notable landowner and agriculturalist Allen Charles Cole of ‘Condovers’ farm at Low Street, West Tilbury, whom he had married in the village church, 1916. A short interval of renewed war service came with 1940, after which he resumed his headship at Barking, publishing (with H. F. Chettle) ‘A History of Barking Abbey’, 1954, where he also mentions his induction into the Cotswold Boys Club.

Loftus was gazetted Lt. Col. in 1925, and in 1928 he was made an Officer of the Order of the British Empire (military division) and received the Territorial Decoration. In 1929 he was appointed Deputy Lieutenant for the county of Essex, serving for 46 years. In 1935 he was living at ‘Polwicks’, Low Street, West Tilbury.

== In Africa ==
At the age of 70, having retired from teaching in the UK, he took up several posts abroad, as Education Officer in Kenya, Nyasaland and Zambia. In 1974 he was invested as a Commander of the Order of the British Empire (civil division) for his contributions to African education. He died in Harare, Zimbabwe on 7 July 1987 at the age of 103 and his ashes were flown home that summer for interment in the foundation of the medieval Barking Abbey.

== Interest in local history ==
Though his writings about the village were limited to short articles in local newspapers (‘Bata Record’, ‘Grays and Tilbury Gazette’), Loftus envisaged a substantial work, for which meticulous research notebooks were filled. These, and his correspondence late in life from Africa, proved invaluable to the more recent investigations of the parish heritage. His expansive diaries, and various other documents, including a comprehensive listing of monumental inscriptions in St. James’ churchyard, West Tilbury, collected by him while on leave in 1940, are now at Thurrock Museum (donated by his sons, Tony and Peter Loftus, October 1987).

== Books by Loftus ==
- Education and the Citizen (New-World Series.) 1935
- Growls and Grumbles: chiefly educational with a dash of local history ... Being a selection of ... published articles. With a portrait; 1949
- A History of Barking Abbey; 1954
- Speke and the Nile source (Early travellers in East Africa); 1964
- A visual history of East Africa; 1966
