= Villaroel =

- Place of origin: Spain

Villaroel is a surname. Notable people with the surname include:

- Kevon Villaroel (born 1987), Trinidadian soccer player

== See also ==
- Villarroel
