= Anne Collins (contralto) =

British opera singer (1943–2009)

Anne Collins

Anne Collins (29 August 1943 – 15 July 2009) was an English contralto known as versatile operatic singer, praised for her "beautifully warm and wide-ranging timbre, and impeccable diction". In a career that spanned nearly 40 years, she sang a wide range of operatic character roles and other classical pieces, including standard opera repertory, premieres, 20th century pieces, art song and other music.

Collins began her career at Sadler's Wells Opera, from 1970 to 1976. She debuted at Covent Garden in 1975 as Grimgerde in Wagner's Die Walküre. Collins sang with most of the major British opera companies and at opera houses throughout Europe. She used her early musical training when playing the cello onstage as Lady Jane in Gilbert and Sullivan's Patience in several English National Opera productions. She made 20 recordings of serious opera roles and other classical music, and her performances of several Gilbert and Sullivan roles are preserved on video.

== Career ==
Collins was born in Meadowfield, near Durham, the daughter of "a musical family". From 1961 to 1963 she trained at Bretton Hall College, Yorkshire, intending to become a music teacher. She then studied at the Royal College of Music, London, first the cello and then vocal studies; her teachers included Meriel St Clair and Oda Slobodskaya.

Collins made her debut for Sadler's Wells Opera as the Governess in The Queen of Spades in 1970. She performed with that company, through its transition into English National Opera (ENO), until 1976, in many roles, including the British stage premieres of War and Peace (Akhrosimova) in 1972 and The Bassarids (Beroe) in 1974. She began her association with Gilbert and Sullivan's operas at ENO, starting with her "formidable" Fairy Queen in Iolanthe (1971). There, she also sang her four roles for the first time in Wagner's Ring cycle (1973).

Collins was a particularly versatile operatic singer, including in her repertoire roles in early opera (such as Arnalta in The Coronation of Poppea), German works (Adelaide in Arabella as well as her Wagner roles), Russian opera (Clarissa in The Love for Three Oranges and Filipyevna in Eugene Onegin), French works (Antonia's Mother in The Tales of Hoffmann and Ragonde in Count Ory), Italian operas (Mamma Lucia in Cavalleria rusticana, Suzuki in Madame Butterfly, Ulrica in Un ballo in maschera and Mistress Quickly in Falstaff), and played English roles from Katisha in The Mikado to Mrs Sedley and Auntie in Peter Grimes. She notably played the cello onstage while singing Lady Jane in Patience for ENO, a role she also sang in New York and Vienna. In The Times, Alan Blyth called it "a connoisseur's performance".

Collins made her Covent Garden debut in 1975 as Grimgerde in Die Walküre and later appeared there as Anna in Berlioz's The Trojans (1977), as the Mother in Ravel's L'Enfant et les Sortilèges (1983), Mary in Wagner's The Flying Dutchman (1986), the Mother Superior in Prokofiev's The Fiery Angel (1992) and Auntie in Peter Grimes (2004), the last of which she sang in several productions in Europe. At Opera North she sang the nurse in Ariane et Barbe-bleue. She sang at the Last Night of the Proms in 1976 and 1980, as well as taking part in concert performances of Patience, The Midsummer Marriage and The Gypsy Baron at the Proms. She also played in the first two of these roles both within and outside Britain. She played Mistress Page in The Merry Wives of Windsor at Wexford in 1976. Collins was engaged at several European opera houses including Brussels, Frankfurt, Hamburg and La Scala. After her debut in Geneva in 1977 (First Norn), she returned there from 1990 to 1993 to sing Auntie in Peter Grimes, The Hostess in Boris Godunov and Marcellina in Le Nozze di Figaro. She appeared in Ezio and Hercules for the Handel Opera Society. In Ezio she "managed to steal each scene her (comparatively minor) character was in, simply by singing her lines with faultless diction so that the audience realised how unintentionally funny they were." Her Glyndebourne debut was as Florence Pike in Albert Herring in 1986. She created the role of the Nurse/Old woman in Ines de Castro for Scottish Opera in 1996."

In 1982, she appeared in the Brent Walker Productions telefilms of Gilbert and Sullivan's Patience (as Lady Jane), Iolanthe, (the Fairy Queen), Princess Ida (Lady Blanche), The Mikado (Katisha), and The Gondoliers (Duchess of Plaza-Toro). She participated in several of the BBC broadcasts of the Savoy operas in 1989, singing the roles of Blanche and Duchess, as well as Dame Carruthers in The Yeomen of the Guard and Dame Hannah in Ruddigore. She later played Blanche in Ken Russell's production of Princess Ida for ENO at the Coliseum Theatre in 1992.

Grove comments that Collins was a "versatile singer with a strong, even voice … equally at home in Wagner and in Gilbert and Sullivan"; Opera praised her beautifully warm and wide-ranging timbre, and impeccable diction.

Collins died of cancer in Sussex, aged 65.

== Recordings ==
Composer	Work	Role	Conductor	Date	ref
Berkeley	A Dinner Engagement	Grand Duchess	Richard Hickox	2004	
Britten	Albert Herring	Mrs Herring	Richard Hickox	2003	
Britten	Peter Grimes	Mrs Sedley	Richard Hickox	1996	
Britten (arr)	The Beggar's Opera	Mrs Peachum	Steuart Bedford	1993	
Delius	Margot la Rouge	Licensee and Third Woman	Norman Del Mar	1981	
Elgar	Coronation Ode	-	Sir Alexander Gibson	1977	
Janáček	Glagolitic Mass	-	Rudolf Kempe	1974	
Monteverdi	The Coronation of Poppea	Arnalta	Raymond Leppard	1971	
Mozart	Die Zauberflöte	Third Lady	Sir Neville Marriner	1990	
Puccini	Suor Angelica	Abbess	Richard Bonynge	1973	
Stravinsky	The Rake's Progress	Mother Goose	Kent Nagano	1996	
Sullivan	The Yeomen of the Guard	Dame Carruthers	Sir Neville Marriner	1993	
Tchaikovsky	Vakula the Smith	Solokha	Edward Downes	1990	
Vaughan Williams	The Poisoned Kiss	Empress Persicaria	Richard Hickox	2003	
Vivaldi	sacred music	-	Vittorio Negri	1976–90	
Monteverdi	madrigals	-	Raymond Leppard	1969–75	
Wagner	The Rhinegold	Erda	Reginald Goodall	1975	
Wagner	The Valkyrie	Rossweisse	Reginald Goodall	1975	
Wagner	Siegfried	Erda	Reginald Goodall	1973	
Wagner	Twilight of the Gods	First Norn	Reginald Goodall	1977	
