= Daniel Aaron =

American writer and academic (1912–2016)

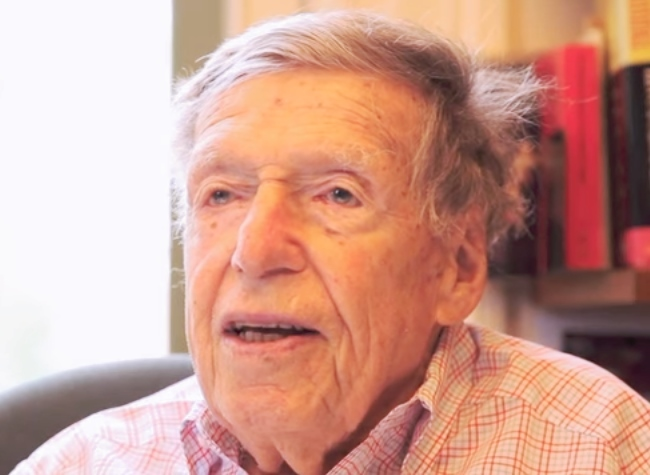
- Aaron in a 2010 interview
- Born: Daniel Baruch Aaron; August 4, 1912; Chicago, Illinois, U.S.
- Died: April 30, 2016 (aged 103); Cambridge, Massachusetts, U.S.
- Education: University of Michigan (BA); Harvard University (PhD)
- Occupations: Americanist, academic
- Employer: Harvard University
- Title: Victor S. Thomas Professor of English and American Literature Emeritus
- Board member of: Library of America
- Awards: National Humanities Medal

Daniel Aaron (August 4, 1912 – April 30, 2016) was an American writer and academic who helped found the Library of America.

== Education ==
Daniel Baruch Aaron, the son of Jewish immigrants from Russia, was born in 1912. Aaron received a BA from the University of Michigan, and later did graduate studies at Harvard University. In 1937, Aaron became the first to graduate with a degree in "American Civilization" from Harvard University.

== Career ==
=== Writing ===
Aaron published his first scholarly paper in 1935, "Melville and the Missionaries". He wrote studies on the American Renaissance, the Civil War, and American progressive writers. His last work was an autobiography, The Americanist (2007). He edited the diaries of American poet Arthur Crew Inman (1895–1963): some 17 million words from 1919 to 1963. He wrote a number of articles for the New York Review of Books.

=== Teaching ===
Aaron taught at Smith College for three decades and at Harvard from 1971 to 1983. He was the Victor S. Thomas Professor of English and American Literature Emeritus at Harvard. His son, Jonathan Aaron, is an accomplished poet who holds a doctorate from Yale University and teaches writing at Emerson College in Boston, Massachusetts.

=== Publishing ===
In 1979, he helped found the Library of America, where he served as president to 1985 and board member and remained an emeritus board member.

== Recognition ==
Aaron was elected a fellow of the American Academy of Arts and Sciences in 1973 and a member of the American Academy of Arts and Letters in 1977.

He was awarded an honorary Doctor of Letters degree by Harvard University in 2007.

In 2010, he was a National Humanities Medalist, whose citation reads:

Daniel Aaron: Literary scholar for his contributions to American literature and culture. As the founding president of the Library of America, he helped preserve our nation's heritage by publishing America's most significant writing in authoritative editions.

== Selected works ==
=== Writing ===
- Commonplace Book, 1934-2012 (Pressed Wafer 2015)
- Scrap Book (Pressed Wafer 2014)
- The Americanist (2007).
- American Notes: Selected Essays (1994).
- Cincinnati, Queen City of the West: 1819-1838 (1992)
- The Unwritten War: American Writers and the Civil War (1973)
- America in Crisis: Fourteen Crucial Episodes in American History (1971)
- Writers on the Left: Episodes in American Literary Communism (1961, 1974 and 1992)
- Men of Good Hope (1951)

=== Editing ===
- Arthur Crew Inman, From a Darkened Room: The Inman Diary, ed. Daniel Aaron (Cambridge, MA: Harvard University Press, 1996)
- Arthur Crew Inman, The Inman Diary: A Public and Private Confession (Cambridge, MA: Harvard University Press, 1985)
- Paul Elmer More, Shelburne Essays on American Literature, ed. Daniel Aaron (New York: Harcourt, Brace & World, 1963)

== See also ==
- List of members of the American Academy of Arts and Letters Department of Literature
