= List of longest diaries =

This is a list of diaries notable for their exceptional length, primarily by word count but also by duration.

Table of diaries sortable by word count and duration
Author	Word count	Duration	Period	Notes
Laura Penrose Francis (Note: Said to be a pseudonym.)	40 million	60 years	1952–2012	Word count and duration as of 2012.
Robert Shields	37.5 million	25 years	1972–1997	Exact word count not available until 2049.
Claude Fredericks	30 million	80 years	1932–2012	Word count is estimated; the manuscript runs to 65,000 pages.
Joseph Holloway	25 million	45 years	1899–1944	"Dublin playgoer." Published diaries 1899 to 1944.
Edward Robb Ellis	22 million	71 years	1927–1998	
Heinrich Witt	18 million	70 years	1859–1890	Witt (1799–1892) was born in Germany, lived in Peru, and wrote in English.
Arthur Crew Inman	17 million	44 years	1919–1963	155 volumes. Other accounts state 10 million words.
Tony Benn	15 million (Note: "The full unedited diaries [in 2007] amount to around fifteen million words." A figure of 20 million refers to "the full archive.")	69 years	1940–2009	"...sixty-nine years of writing, typing or dictating almost every day..."
Li Shuxiang	13 million	74 years	1941–2015 (Note: According to article from 2015.)	85 volumes.
Nella Last	12 million	28 years	1939–1967	Participant in Mass Observation project.
Dr. John Henry Salter	10 million	83 years	1849–1932	GP of Tolleshunt D'Arcy, Essex.
Thomas McGrath	9 million	50 years	1973–2022 (Note: According to article from 2022.)	
Henri-Frédéric Amiel	6 million	42 years	1839–1881	173 journals; 16,800 pages.
Harold L. Ickes	6 million	19 years	1933–1952	"...nearly a hundred volumes of closely-typed copy..."
Ellsworth James	5.9 million	63 years	1944–2007	Word count does not include first year (1944) which was handwritten. 1946-2007 manually typed.
Anne Lister	5.6 million (Note: Total word count 5,632,524 words.)	34 years	1806–1840	She frequently used a cypher or "crypt hand" she had devised herself.
Amos Bronson Alcott	5 million	71 years	1811–1882	...over sixty surviving volumes containing nearly five million words...
Arthur Christopher Benson	5 million	28 years	1897–1925	Author of 'Land of Hope and Glory.'
Rev. Dr. John Morgans O.B.E.	5 million	52 years	1952–2004	Life as schoolboy, student, and minister in Wales.
Frederic Madden	4 million	54 years	1819–1873	43 volumes.
Leo Tolstoy	4 million	63 years	1847–1910	
George Templeton Strong	4 million	40 years	1835–1875	"A monumental diary, in the tradition of Pepys, Evelyn or Sewall..."
John Gadd	4 million	45 years	1975–2020	Started in 1947 but kept consistently from 1975.
Richard Grayson	4 million	32 years	1969–2001	Published diary entries from 1 August 1969 to 20 October 2001
Rev. Dr. Andrew Clark	3 million	5 years	1914–1919	92 volumes.
Harold Nicolson	3 million	34 years	1930–1964	Diplomat, journalist, Member of Parliament, junior minister, writer, critic & broadcaster.
George Cecil Ives	3 million	64 years	1886–1950	"...122 volumes and approximately 3 million words."
John Quincy Adams	3 million	69 years	1779–1848	Nearly 3 million words, 1,400 pages, 51 volumes.
George C. Edler	2.859 million	80 years	1907–1987	Diary from 1 January 1907 to 25 February 1987, the day of his passing.
Philip Hone	2 million	23 years	1828–1851	"...twenty-eight quarto volumes..."
Henry David Thoreau	2 million	25 years	1837–1861	Over 2 million words in 39 notebooks.
Edward Nason (Note: Matthews gives Nason, Batts gives Mason.) Wrench	2 million	56 years	1856–1912	Nearly 2 million words in 57 vols.
Naomi Mitchison	2 million	6 years	1939–1945	Participant in Mass Observation. Diary published forty years after she wrote it.
Beatrice Webb	1.79 million	70 years	1873–1943	Diaries available online.
Chen Xiukang	1.5 million	4 years	2012–2016 (Note: According to article from 2016.)	Began keeping a diary to cope with his wife's death.
Samuel Pepys	1.25 million	9 years	1660–1669	Written in shorthand. The 1893 edition is available online.
Margaret Elizabeth Fountaine	1 million	61 years	1878–1939	12 volume diary.
Jean Lucey Pratt	1 million	61 years	1925–1986	Over a million words in 45 exercise books.
Ernest Achey Loftus	Unknown	92 years (Note: From 1 January 1895 to 31 December 1986, 33,602 days.)	1896–1987	Guinness World Record for longest kept diary.
Evie Riski	Unknown	89 years	1936–2025 (Note: According to article dated 25 February 2025.)	"A 100-year-old American woman has journalled every day for 90 years... nearly 33,000 entries..." [Actually 89 years or 32,547 days]
Albert Memmi	Unknown	83 years	1936–2019	Yale archive has journals to 2019; "...hundreds of school notebooks..."
Robert W. Ramsay	Unknown	82 years	1869–1951	Diaries from April 1869 to January 1951. 44 vols. Commenced when he was 8 years old.
Julien Green	Unknown	79 years	1919–1998	"...he wrote with an audience in mind..."
Betty from Lancashire	Unknown	76 years	1942–2018	"...diaries were meticulously completed every day, and record almost all her everyday activities."
Robert Parry	Unknown	74 years	1539–1613	Diary written in Welsh.
Frances Partridge	Unknown	74 years	1927–2002	Diary from 31 October 1927 to 15 March 2002, her 102nd birthday.
Anne Perkins	Unknown	74 years	1935–2009	American, Quaker, librarian at Swarthmore College. Over one hundred volumes, only 16 were preserved.
Henry Edward Price	Unknown	74 years	c.1830–1904	Cabinet maker, begins with reminiscence of childhood.
Robert Birrel	Unknown	73 years	1532–1605	Burgess of Edinburgh, diary of incidents in Scotland.
Jeremiah Moseley	Unknown	73 years	1803–1876	18 volumes.
John Amphlett	Unknown	73 years	1854–1918	42 volumes, extremely full accounts.
Emma Katherine Bigwood	Unknown	73 years	1862–1935	"...brief daily entries"
Daniel Times	Unknown	72 years	1776–1848	Coroner, medical diary.
Sir Thomas Francis Fremantle	Unknown	72 years	1798–1890	51 vols, September 1814–January 1815 and 1837–86.
Sir Arthur Pendarves Vivian	Unknown	72 years	1851–1923	64 volumes, personal and travel journals.
Joseph Jeppa Anderson	Unknown	72 years	1878–1950	20 volumes.
Thomas Asline Ward	Unknown	71 years	1800–1871	Master Cutler of Sheffield in 1816. Some entries in French, Italian or Latin.
Prince George, Duke of Cambridge	Unknown	71 years	1832–1903	Enormous and consistent record of his whole life.
Ellen Laetitia Philips	Unknown	71 years	1842–1913	48 volumes: 1842, 1850–79, and 1881–1913.
Ethel Rudkin	Unknown	71 years	1912–1983	"...filled dozens of notebooks."
William Ewart Gladstone	Unknown	70 years	1826–1896	Private diary, 1826 to 1895 or 1896.
Mary Barwick Baker	Unknown	70 years	1834–1904	Née Fenwick. Personal notes entered in annual volumes.
Lady Louisa de Rothschild	Unknown	70 years	1837–1907	Diary from July 1837 to December 1907 (with gaps).
Lady Anne Noel Blunt	Unknown	70 years	1837–1917	Née King. 214 volumes, July 1847 to November 1917.
Violet Bonham Carter	Unknown	70 years	1899–1969	Diaries online.
Sir Moses Montefiore	Unknown	69 years	1814–1883	85 vols.
William Beaumont	Unknown	69 years	1816–1885	British lawyer. Diary April 1816–November 1885 (with gaps): 15 vols. Travel journals 1825–1842.
John Oxley Parker	Unknown	69 years	1829–1898	Land-agent: diaries and day-books. High Sheriff of Essex in 1883.
Claude Mauriac	Unknown	69 years	1927–1995	Lejeune gives both 68 and 69 years. "We have yet to count the total number of pages, but the journal measures three and a half meters."
Elizabeth Wynne Fremantle	Unknown	68 years	1789–1857	41 volumes. Her two sisters also kept diaries.
Fanny Knatchbull	Unknown	68 years	1804–1872	Second wife of 9th Bart. Diaries 1804–72 (with gaps). 69 vols.
Colonel John Coke	Unknown	68 years	1820–1887	Diaries with gaps, 11 vols.
Frances Russell, Countess Russell	Unknown	68 years	1830–1898	Social diary, November 1830–January 1898.
Queen Victoria	Unknown (Note: It is calculated that she wrote an average of 2,500 words a day, or sixty million words. However this estimate includes correspondence, notes, minutes, annotations and memoranda as well as her diary.)	68 years (Note: From 31 July 1832 to 11 January 1901, 68 years and 5 months.)	1832–1901	Over 100 volumes. Her daughter Beatrice copied selected passages from the journals and burned many of the originals.
Angelo Roncalli (Pope John XXIII)	Unknown	68 years	1895–1963	Published in 1964 as Journal of a soul.
Rev. Thomas Smith	Unknown	67 years	1721–1788	May 1721–May 1788; mostly brief, impersonal notes.
Lady Emily Theophilia Ashbrook	Unknown	67 years	1813–1880	Née Metcalfe. Diaries and travel journals, c.1813–1880: 57 vols.
Rev. John Brownlow	Unknown	67 years	1816–1883	Diary and memoranda, part recollection.
J. Taylor	Unknown	67 years	1826–1893	Diary with gaps, family and local (Sutton-on-Trent) events.
John Burroughs	Unknown	67 years	1854–1921	American naturalist & author; March 1857–February 1921.
Charles Whitwell	Unknown	67 years	1888–1955	Detailed daily events, January 1888–July 1955; 70 vols.
Alan Withington	Unknown	67 years	1931–1998	"Lengthy daily entries with many photographs attached."
Luca Landucci	Unknown	66 years	1450–1516	Florentine apothecary.
Sarah Savage	Unknown	66 years	1686–1752	Welsh diarist, as was her father Rev. Philip Henry.
John Wesley	Unknown	66 years	1725–1791	Daily, even hourly, memoranda were his diaries; the enlarged, fuller versions were his Journal.
Capt. James Stackpole	Unknown	66 years	1755–1821	"Diary, with journal of 1790–1821."
Jacob Nagle	Unknown	66 years	1775–1841	American Sailor, at sea for forty-five years.
Stephen Terry	Unknown	66 years	1795–1861	Sporting diaries and reminiscences.
Katherine Arundel	Unknown	66 years	1804–1870	Meetings with French émigrés, tours and pilgrimages.
Charles Cardale Babington	Unknown	66 years	1825–1891	Botanical diary, brief entries.
Richard Thomas Lloyd	Unknown	66 years	1832–1898	Family matters; tour of Europe in 1838.
Jane Edmunds	Unknown	66 years	1834–1900	Diary with gaps, 1 vol.
Edward George Percy Littleton	Unknown	66 years	1864–1930	3rd. Lord Hatherton. Diaries with gaps, 3 vols. Brief entries, military career.
Frederick Augustus Dixey	Unknown	66 years	1869–1935	Distinguished entomologist. 20 vols.
William Henry Hallam	Unknown	66 years	1886–1952	63 volumes, broken only twice between 1894 and 1897.
Richard Meinertzhagen	Unknown	66 years	1899–1965	British soldier, intelligence officer, and ornithologist: 76 vols.
Rev. Ivory Hovey	Unknown	65 years	1738–1803	Written mostly in shorthand: nine octavo volumes, about 7000 pages.
Rev. John Mill	Unknown	65 years	1738–1803	Parish work in Shetland and North Hebrides.
Frances Burney	Unknown	65 years	1768–1833	March 1768–March 1833; diary, memoirs and letters.
Mary Berry	Unknown	65 years	1783–1848	Author. Diary from May 1783–August 1848, regularly from 1807.
William Darling	Unknown	65 years	1795–1860	Lighthouse-keeper, father of Grace Darling. Private diary, April 1795–October 1860.
Sir Ernest Mason Satow	Unknown	65 years	1861–1926	39 volumes, November 1861–December 1926 (with considerable gaps).
Sir Sydney Cockerell	Unknown	65 years	1886–c.1951	Museum curator and collector. Diary from January 1886 to c.1951.
Rt. Rev. Gwynne	Unknown	65 years	1888–1953	Missionary in the Sudan. Diaries, papers, sermons etc.
Hester Thrale	Unknown	64 years	1757–1821	
General William Dyott	Unknown	64 years	1781–1845	
Sir Rowland Hill	Unknown	64 years	1813–1877	Eleven volumes.
William Robson	Unknown	64 years	1817–1881	
Rev. Andrew Bonar	Unknown	64 years	1828–1892	Written in shorthand.
Anaïs Nin	Unknown	64 years	1913–1977	Published diaries extend to 1974.
Rev. Samuel Fairclough	Unknown	63 years	1614–1677	Written in Greek and Latin.
Thomas Gardiner	Unknown	63 years	1661–1724	Brief notes.
Elizabeth Laugher	Unknown	63 years	1731–1794	Née Mascall.
Susanna Holyoke Ward	Unknown	63 years	1793–1856	
Joseph Hunter	Unknown	63 years	1797–1860	Much of it is in shorthand.
Ellen A. Hall	Unknown	63 years	1838–1901	Has gaps. 22 vols.
Emily Mary Hall	Unknown	63 years	1838–1901	Has gaps. 23 vols.
Reginald Charles Edward Abbot	Unknown	63 years	1856–1919	Has gaps. 54 vols.
Dr. Michael Thomas Sadler	Unknown	63 years	1860–1923	Medicine, science, travels, reading, Gilbert and Sullivan.
Annette Susannah Beveridge	Unknown	63 years	1865–1928	Née Ackroyd; 62 vols.
Paul Léautaud	Unknown	63 years	1893–1956	
Sanjōnishi Sanetaka	Unknown	62 years	1455–1537	His Sanetaka Kōki is also given a duration of 63 years.
William Lyon Mackenzie King	Unknown	57 years	1893–1950	Word count not stated; the manuscript exceeds 50,000 pages.

William Matthews, in his British diaries: An annotated bibliography of British diaries written between 1442 and 1942 (University of California Press, Berkeley and Los Angeles, 1950) lists 400 diaries with a duration of 30 years or more.

== See also ==
- List of books on diaries and journals
- List of largest single-volume books by page count
