= Thomas Oboe Lee =

Chinese-American composer (born 1945)

- Born: September 5, 1945 (age 80); Beijing, China
- Occupation: Composer

Thomas Oboe Lee (born September 5, 1945) is a Chinese-American composer.

== Early life and education ==
Lee was born in Beijing, China, on September 5, 1945. His family left China in 1949, lived in Hong Kong, and later relocated to São Paulo, Brazil, before Lee emigrated to the United States in 1966.

Lee began his musical education in Brazil and performed as a jazz flutist with musicians such as Chico Buarque. After moving to the United States, he earned a bachelor's degree in music from the University of Pittsburgh. He studied at the New England Conservatory of Music from 1972 to 1976 under William Thomas McKinley, George Russell, and Gunther Schuller. In 1976, he attended the Tanglewood Music Center to study with Betsy Jolas. He studied at Harvard University from 1977 to 1981 with Earl Kim.

== Career ==
Lee served on the faculty at the Berklee College of Music during the late 1970s. He joined the music faculty at Boston College in 1990.

In 1981, Lee and five other composers from the New England Conservatory founded the collective "Composers in Red Sneakers." The group organized contemporary music concerts in the Boston-Cambridge area and released a collaborative LP in 1984. Lee left the collective in 1986 to live in Italy for 12 months on a Rome Prize Fellowship.

Lee's catalog includes more than 270 works, including 10 symphonies, 15 concerti, 23 string quartets, and the two-act opera The Inman Diaries. The opera, based on the diary of the Boston recluse Arthur Crew Inman, premiered in Boston in 2007 and received a mixed review in The Boston Globe. His 1982 piece Third String Quartet ... child of Uranus, father of Zeus won First Prize at the Kennedy Center Friedheim Awards. The Kronos Quartet commissioned and recorded his 1983 composition Morango ... Almost A Tango, which incorporates Argentinian stylistic elements and jazz rhythms.

He received two Guggenheim Fellowships (1983, 1986), two National Endowment for the Arts Fellowships, and two Massachusetts Artists Foundation Fellowships. In 1985, the American Academy and Institute of Arts and Letters awarded him the Charles Ives Fellowship.

== Recordings ==
- Thomas Oboe Lee String Quartets – performed by the Hawthorne String Quartet. Label: Koch International 3-7452-2-III
- Thomas Oboe Lee The Visconti-Sforza Tarot Cards – performed by the Hirsch-Pinkas Piano Duo. Label: Arsis Audio CD 148
- Thomas Oboe Lee Six Concertos – performed by the Boston Modern Orchestra Project. Label: BMOP/sound 1025
