= Land of Hope and Glory =

English patriotic song composed by music by Edward Elgar with lyrics by A. C. Benson

"Land of Hope and Glory"

Land of Hope and Glory, Mother of the Free,
How shall we extol thee, who are born of thee?
Wider still and wider shall thy bounds be set;
God, who made thee mighty, make thee mightier yet,
God, who made thee mighty, make thee mightier yet.

"Land of Hope and Glory" sung by Clara Butt in 1911

"Land of Hope and Glory" is an English patriotic song, with music by Edward Elgar, written in 1901 and with lyrics by A. C. Benson added in 1902.

== Composition ==
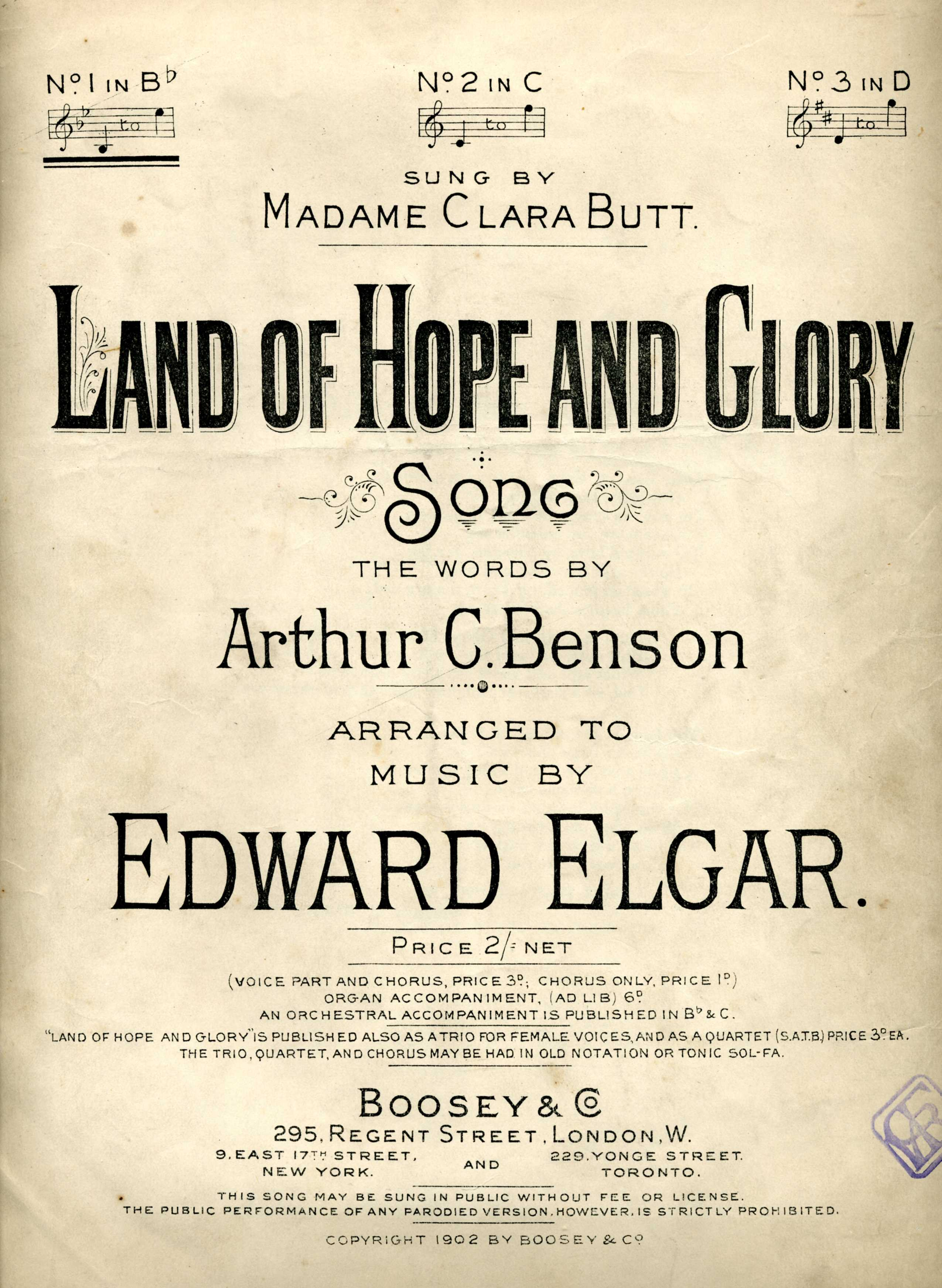

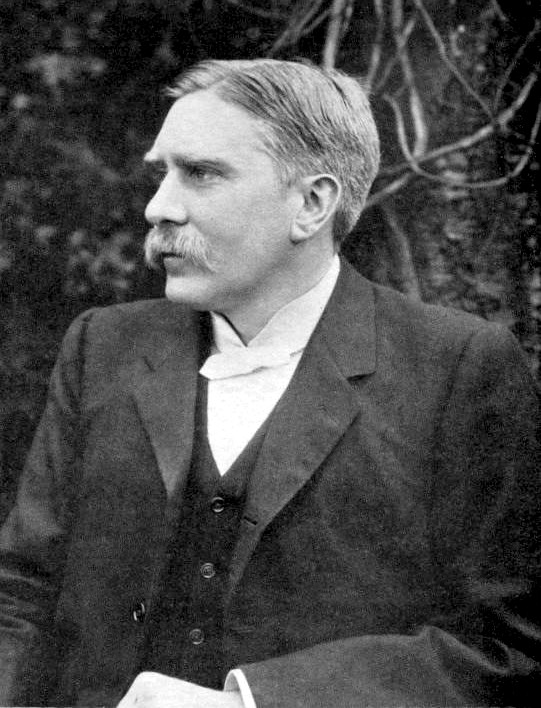
A. C. Benson, lyricist

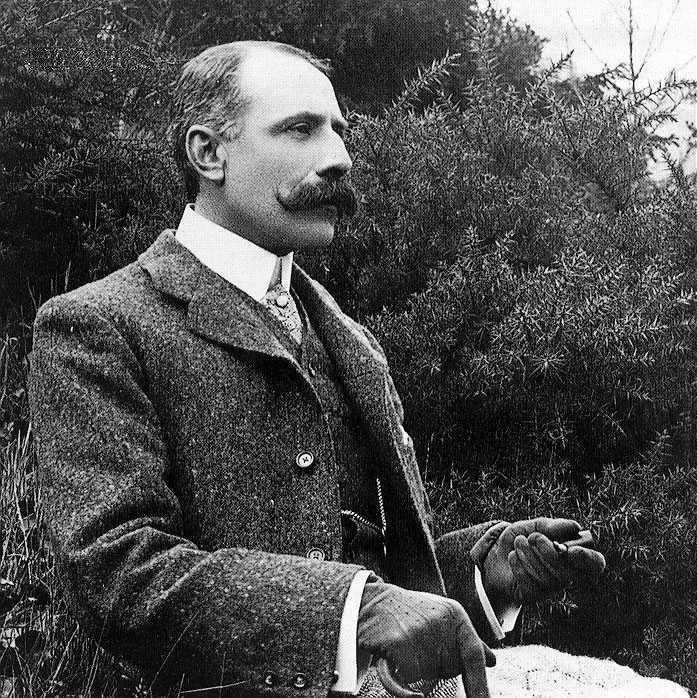
Edward Elgar, composer

The music to which the words of the refrain "Land of Hope and Glory" (Note: It is only the music of the refrain that is in the first Pomp and Circumstance March. The words and music for the two solo verses were written and composed specially for the published song and were not in the Coronation Ode.) below are set is the 'trio' theme from Edward Elgar's Pomp and Circumstance March No. 1. The words were fitted to the melody on the suggestion of King Edward VII who told Elgar he thought the melody would make a great song. When Elgar was requested to write a work for the King's coronation, he worked the suggestion into his Coronation Ode, for which he used words provided by the poet and essayist A. C. Benson. The first and last sections of the Ode use the march's melody.

The first five notes of the refrain are similar to the first two bars of God Save the King in an early version published in 1745.

Owing to the King's illness, the coronation was postponed. Elgar created a separate song, which was first performed by Madame Clara Butt in June 1902. In fact, only the first of the seven stanzas of the Ode's final section was re-used, as the first four lines of the second stanza below. This stanza is the part which is popularly sung today.

=== Lyrics ===
1st Verse:
Dear Land of Hope, thy hope is crowned,
God make thee mightier yet!
On Sov'ran (Note: The original 'Sov'ran', sometimes (for better understanding) printed 'Sov'reign', meaning 'Sovereign') brows, beloved, renowned,
Once more thy crown is set.
Thine equal laws, by Freedom gained,
Have ruled thee well and long;
By Freedom gained, by Truth maintained,
Thine Empire shall be strong.

Chorus:
Land of Hope and Glory, Mother of the Free,
How shall we extol thee, who are born of thee?
Wider still and wider shall thy bounds be set;
God, who made thee mighty, make thee mightier yet,
God, who made thee mighty, make thee mightier yet!

2nd Verse:
Thy fame is ancient as the days,
As Ocean large and wide:
A pride that dares, and heeds not praise,
A stern and silent pride;
Not that false joy that dreams content
With what our sires have won;
The blood a hero sire hath spent
Still nerves a hero son.

Chorus

== Usage ==
=== BBC Proms ===
The Proms began in 1895; in 1901 Elgar's newly composed 'Pomp and Circumstance' March No. 1 was introduced as an orchestral piece (a year before the words were written), conducted by Henry Wood who later recollected "little did I think then that the lovely broad melody of the trio would one day develop into our second national anthem". It was played as "Land of Hope and Glory" in the last concert of the 1905 proms, and at the first and last concerts of the 1909 Proms, which also featured Wood's Fantasia on British Sea Songs. The two pieces were played one after another at the closing concerts in 1916, 1917 and 1918. From 1927, the BBC began supporting the Proms, with radio broadcasts bringing the music to an increasingly wide audience.

"Land of Hope and Glory" featured in the final concerts for 1928, 1929, 1936 and 1939. By then, audience participation in the second half of the programme had become a ritual, and from 1947 a boisterous 'tradition' was created by the conductor Malcolm Sargent, making "Land of Hope and Glory" part of a standard programme for the event. The Last Night of the Proms was broadcast annually on television from 1953 onwards, and Promenaders began dressing up outrageously and waving flags and banners during the climax of the evening. In some years, "Land of Hope and Glory" and the other favourites were left out of the programme but reinstated after press and public outrage. In an exception, for the 2001 Last Night concert following the September 11 attacks, the conductor Leonard Slatkin substituted a more serious programme, featuring Samuel Barber's "Adagio for Strings", but despite the success of this occasion, the now traditional pieces returned the following year.

In 2020, the BBC announced a decision not to feature "Land of Hope and Glory" as well as "Rule, Britannia!" in the Last Night of the Proms running order. This break from tradition prompted outrage from some members of the public, the media and some politicians, including Prime Minister Boris Johnson who accused the BBC of "cringing embarrassment about our history". Further reporting hypothesised that the decision was made in light of renewed prominence for the Black Lives Matter movement, after the murder of George Floyd earlier in the summer, supporters of which accused the songs of glorifying colonialism and slavery. The BBC later reversed the decision, claiming the original move was due to the COVID-19 pandemic social-distancing measures, and that they would now be sung. Ultimately, both songs were featured albeit with a reduced-capacity choir and orchestra.

=== Sporting events ===
==== Rugby League ====
At international rugby league matches, England often sang "Land of Hope and Glory" as their national anthem. Although their anthem changed to "God Save the Queen" after formation of the Great Britain side in 2007, it is still tradition for the team to use "Land of Hope and Glory" as their walk-out theme.

==== Football ====
Supporters of Wolverhampton Wanderers Football Club (the team Elgar supported) sing a version of the song with the lyrics changed to 'We will follow the Wanderers over land, sea, and water.' Their local rivals West Bromwich Albion sing 'We will follow the Albion over land, sea, and water.' Supporters of Huddersfield Town sing 'We're all following Huddersfield, over land and sea'. Derby County and Chelsea football club supporters sing 'We all follow Derby/Chelsea, over land and sea (and Leicester)', although supporters of Arsenal sang this first; similarly Blackburn Rovers fans sing 'We all follow the Rovers, over the land and sea (and Preston!)'.

==== Commonwealth Games ====
"Land of Hope and Glory" was the England team's victory anthem at the Commonwealth Games until 2010, when the public rejected it in a poll in favour of "Jerusalem".

=== Proposed anthem for England ===
England currently has no agreed national anthem. However, there have been calls for this to be changed, with a 2006 survey conducted by the BBC suggesting that 55% of the English public would rather have "Land of Hope and Glory" than "God Save the King" as their national anthem.

=== Films and television ===
"Land of Hope and Glory" was sung by Jeanette MacDonald in the 1941 MGM film, Smilin' Through.

Stanley Kubrick's 1971 film A Clockwork Orange uses Elgar's version to herald the arrival of the Minister of the Interior in Alex's story.

At the end of every episode of It Ain't Half Hot Mum, the character Muhammad (portrayed by Dino Shafeek) would sing the song while playing the sitar, before he was interrupted by Sergeant Major Williams (portrayed by Windsor Davies), yelling at him to "shut up!", which was Williams' catchphrase.

The song inspired the title of John Boorman's 1987 film of the same name, depicting World War II through the eyes of a 10-year-old boy.

The song is considered as the unofficial party anthem of the Conservative Party. In 1997, the Labour Party broadcast a 5 minute long television broadcast criticising the Conservatives and John Major as Prime Minister. The song was ironically used in the entirety of the broadcast.

The song is also used in the 2012 Japanese film Little Maestra. The song is heard three times throughout the film.

In the British television comedy The Goodies, a recurring joke involves Tim Brooke-Taylor's character playing a recording of "Land of Hope and Glory" every time he makes a patriotic, motivational speech.

It was used for the British postcard for the Eurovision Song Contest 1982 before the British entry.

=== Graduation ceremonies (United States, Canada and The Philippines) ===
Instrumental version commonly used in graduation ceremonies, recorded in 1931

In the United States, Canada, and the Philippines, the instrumental version of this song is traditionally associated with high school and college (university) graduation ceremonies. It is played as a processional or recessional often omitting all but the movement of the song over which the chorus is traditionally sung. During ceremonies for larger schools this piece (or the truncated version, if it is being used) is played repeatedly. It may be played for as long as the graduates are marching or walking, which can be longer than some symphonies.

== See also ==
- "Rule, Britannia!", a patriotic British anthem
- "Jerusalem", a patriotic English hymn
- "I Vow to Thee, My Country"
- "God Save The King", the British national anthem
