= Othergates =

1980s market guide series

- Cover of the fourth edition
- Publisher: Unique Graphics
- Publication date: 1980

Othergates is a series of market guides that was published in the 1980s by Unique Graphics.

== Contents ==
Othergates is a publishing guide for writers and artists, particularly in the fantasy, science fiction, and mystery fields. It was edited by Millea Kenin.

== Reception ==
Tadashi Ehara reviewed Othergates No. 3, 1982 for Different Worlds magazine and stated that "Othergates is one of those invaluable references that can be referred to all the time. Care has been taken to help the prospective writer and artist as much as possible Editor Millea Kenin obviously has experience in these matters and it shows with things such as the article on 'Manuscript Format & Submission Procedures' that everyone should follow when writing to a publisher. Othergates is a good investment that will improve your chances of getting your manuscript or artwork accepted for publication."

== Reviews ==
- Review by Robert Coulson (1983) in Amazing Science Fiction, November 1983
- Review of the market guide "Othergates 1984" published by Unique Graphics (Don D'Ammassa) - Science Fiction Chronicle, #60 September 1984
- Amazing Stories v57n04 (1983 11)
