= Arthur Crew Inman =

American writer (1895–1963)

Arthur Crew Inman (May 11, 1895 – December 5, 1963) was a reclusive and unsuccessful American poet whose 17-million-word diary, extending from 1919 to 1963, is one of the longest English-language diaries on record.

== Biography ==
Inman was born May 11, 1895, in Atlanta to one of the city's wealthiest families. His grandfather Samuel Martin Inman owned part of the Atlanta Constitution but derived his wealth from cotton trade and manufacturing.

He left Atlanta to attend the Haverford School and then Haverford College. He left college after two years because of a nervous breakdown, and he never returned to the South after 1915.

He married Evelyn Yates in 1923.

Inman published several volumes of undistinguished poetry. A critic has described Inman as "a mediocre talent, wholly lacking in the sophisticated literary and philosophical education of the Ransom generation."

In 1928 he edited and published Soldier of the South: General Pickett's War Letters to his Wife.

He moved to Boston, where he became increasingly obsessed with his health. He lived for much of his life in dark, soundproofed apartments. He owned several apartments in order to surround himself with noiseless spaces. Having inherited wealth, he was able to cater to his hypochondria and other eccentric ways and afford servants and others hired to come and talk with him. His wife, Evelyn, appears to have accepted that he would have sex with some of these so-called "talkers." He attempted suicide on several occasions. On December 5, 1963, when he found the noise from the construction of the Prudential Tower near his apartment in Brookline, Massachusetts, as well as his series of migraines to be unbearable, he committed suicide with a revolver in his bathroom.

He left 155 handwritten volumes of the diary when he died, entirely unpublished. Inman's diary is not only considered unique by some but historian David Herbert Donald called it "the most remarkable diary ever published by an American." Through its many volumes, Inman provides a panoramic record of people, events, and observations from more than four decades of the twentieth century. The extent of his writing suggests he suffered from hypergraphia.

His wife Evelyn died in 1985.

== The Inman Diaries ==
Harvard professor of English and American literature Daniel Aaron published a two-volume edition of selections in 1985. A one-volume version appeared in 1996. Reviewing the two-volume edition, Time described Inman as a "megalomaniacal bigot misogynist Peeping Tom hypochondriac," who "hated Jews, Italians and Roosevelt while admiring Hitler." The reviewer for the New York Times enjoyed Inman's many portraits of working class and middle class visitors with interesting stories, but thought less of his self-revelations, "that mostly meant giving vent to bristling prejudices about lesser breeds (lesser than Nordic, that is to say)."

Playwright Lorenzo DeStefano authored a play based on the diaries, Camera Obscura, which has been performed at the Seattle Repertory Theatre (2001) and at London's Almeida Theatre (2002). English director Jonathan Miller directed both of those productions.

Lorenzo DeStefano's feature film adaptation, The Diarist is in active development.

The Inman Diaries, an opera by Thomas Oboe Lee, based on the diary and DeStefano's play, was commissioned and produced by Intermezzo Opera of Boston. The world premiere took place there in September 2007.

== In popular culture ==
According to Harley Peyton, producer of the television series Twin Peaks, the character and behavior of the recluse Harold Smith were based on Inman.

== Sources ==
- Georgia Encyclopedia: Hugh Ruppersburg, "Arthur Crew Inman (1895-1963)", accessed December 21, 2010
- Lewis P. Simpson, "The Last Casualty of the Civil War: Arthur Crew Inman," The Fable of the Southern Writer (Baton Rouge: Louisiana State University Press, 1994), 155–82
- Bob Summer, "An Inman's Private Life Becomes Public," Atlanta Journal-Constitution, October 13, 1985
- Philip Zaleski, "The Inman Diary," Atlanta Journal-Constitution, October 27, 1985
