= Morris Villarroel =

Spanish academic

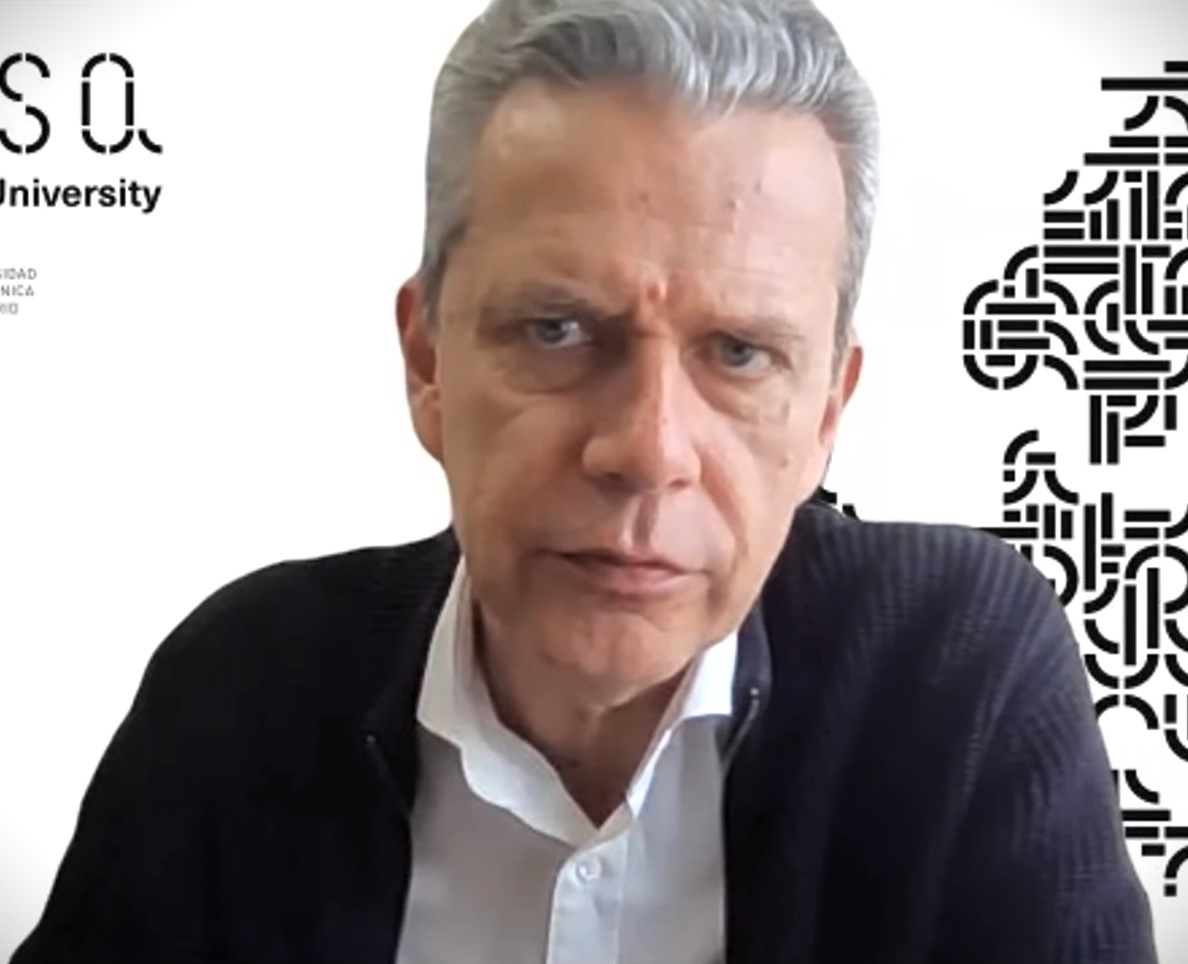
- Villaroel in 2024
- Born: 1978 or 1979 (age 46–47)
- Occupation: Professor of animal psychology
- Known for: Lifelogging

Morris Villarroel (born 1978 or 1979) is a Spanish professor of animal psychology at the Technical University of Madrid. He is also a lifelogger who, since 2010, has been writing what he is currently doing, his location, the food he has eaten, the time he wakes up and his ideas on paper notebooks at 15 to 30 minute intervals every day.

== Logging ==
Since February 2010, Villarroel has been lifelogging. He does this by writing what he is currently doing and where he is located in a notebook, at intervals from about 15 to 30 minutes. He also logs the times he wakes up, the food he eats, and his ideas. He also records his movements with a fitness tracker. An example of a log entry he wrote is "I woke up at 05:45 in a hotel in Sweden. My hind leg muscles were hurting a bit." Once the notebooks fill up, he indexes them in a spreadsheet, with categories and keywords. In 2019 he estimated that he spends about an hour a day writing in his notebook.

He originally planned to do it for 10 years, as an experiment, but once 10 years was over, he decided to continue. He started logging his life with the idea that it could improve his memory and time management skills, and give him a clearer record of what he had done in his life. He has said that it makes him feel like he has lived a longer life, and says that it improves his emotional regulation. As of December 2019 he had filled up 307 notebooks.

In April 2014 Villaroel started wearing a camera on his chest that automatically took photographs every 30 seconds, totalling about 1,200 per day. He wore it for most of the day, but took it off in private moments such as in the bedroom. Some examples of memories he has captured includes when his father died, and when his son was born. He said that while some people could be uncomfortable around the camera, most were supportive of it. He stopped using it after a few years due to difficulty keeping track of the amount of photos it took.

== Personal life ==
Both of Villarroel's parents are psychologists. Villarroel is married, and has five children.

== Selected works ==
- Sañudo, C; Macie, E.S; Olleta, J.L; Villarroel, M; Panea, B; Albertı́, P (2004). "The effects of slaughter weight, breed type and ageing time on beef meat quality using two different texture devices". Meat Science. 66 (4): 925–932. doi:10.1016/j.meatsci.2003.08.005. ISSN 0309-1740. PMID 22061026.
- Miranda-de la Lama, G.C.; Villarroel, M.; María, G.A. (2014). "Livestock transport from the perspective of the pre-slaughter logistic chain: a review". Meat Science. 98 (1): 9–20. doi:10.1016/j.meatsci.2014.04.005. ISSN 0309-1740. PMID 24824530.
- König, Bettina; Janker, Judith; Reinhardt, Tilman; Villarroel, Morris; Junge, Ranka (2018). "Analysis of aquaponics as an emerging technological innovation system". Journal of Cleaner Production. 180: 232–243. Bibcode:2018JCPro.180..232K. doi:10.1016/j.jclepro.2018.01.037. ISSN 0959-6526.

== See also ==
- Quantified self
- Robert Shields
