= Come Rack! Come Rope! =

1912 novel by Robert Hugh Benson

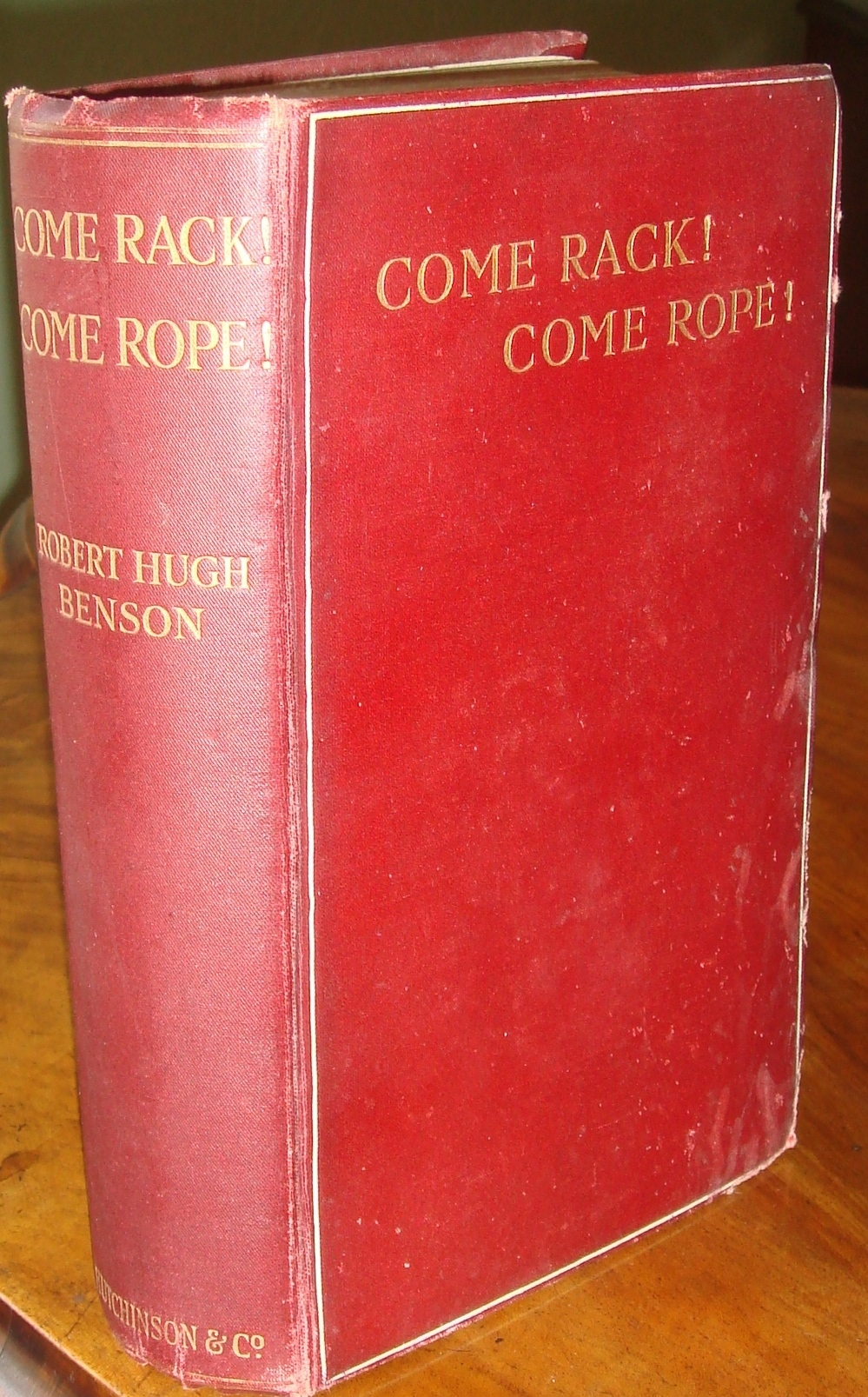
- Cover of the first edition (1912)
- Author: Robert Hugh Benson
- Language: English
- Genre: Historical novel
- Publisher: Burns & Oates & Hutchinson
- Publication date: 1912
- Publication place: United Kingdom
- Media type: Print (hardback)

Come Rack! Come Rope! is a historical novel published in 1912 by the English priest and writer Robert Hugh Benson (1871–1914), a convert to Catholicism from Anglicanism. Set in Derbyshire at the time of the Elizabethan persecution of Catholics, when being or harbouring a priest was considered treason and was punishable with death, it tells the story of two young lovers who give up their chance of happiness together, choosing instead to face imprisonment and martyrdom, so that God's will may be done.

== Background ==
The book was written nearly nine years after Benson's reception into the Catholic Church. The inspiration for the story comes from Dom Bede Camm's account of the recusant Fitzherbert family in Forgotten Shrines (1910), and from Benson's own visit in 1911 to Padley, home of the Fitzherberts, and scene of part of the novel, to preach at the annual pilgrimage there. The title of the book is taken from a letter of Saint Edmund Campion in which, after torture, he assured Catholics that he had revealed "no things of secret, nor would he, come rack, come rope". Most of the characters in the book are historical people; only the hero and heroine, their parents, and some minor characters are fictional.

It is perhaps the best known of Benson's novels, and has been reprinted several times. It was first published by Burns & Oates and Hutchinson in 1912 in the United Kingdom; an American edition was published the same year by Kenedy and Dodd, Mead and Company. A new edition, abridged by Philip Caraman, was published in 1956, while an abridged version by Christopher Busby, was published in 1959.

== Plot summary ==
=== Part I ===
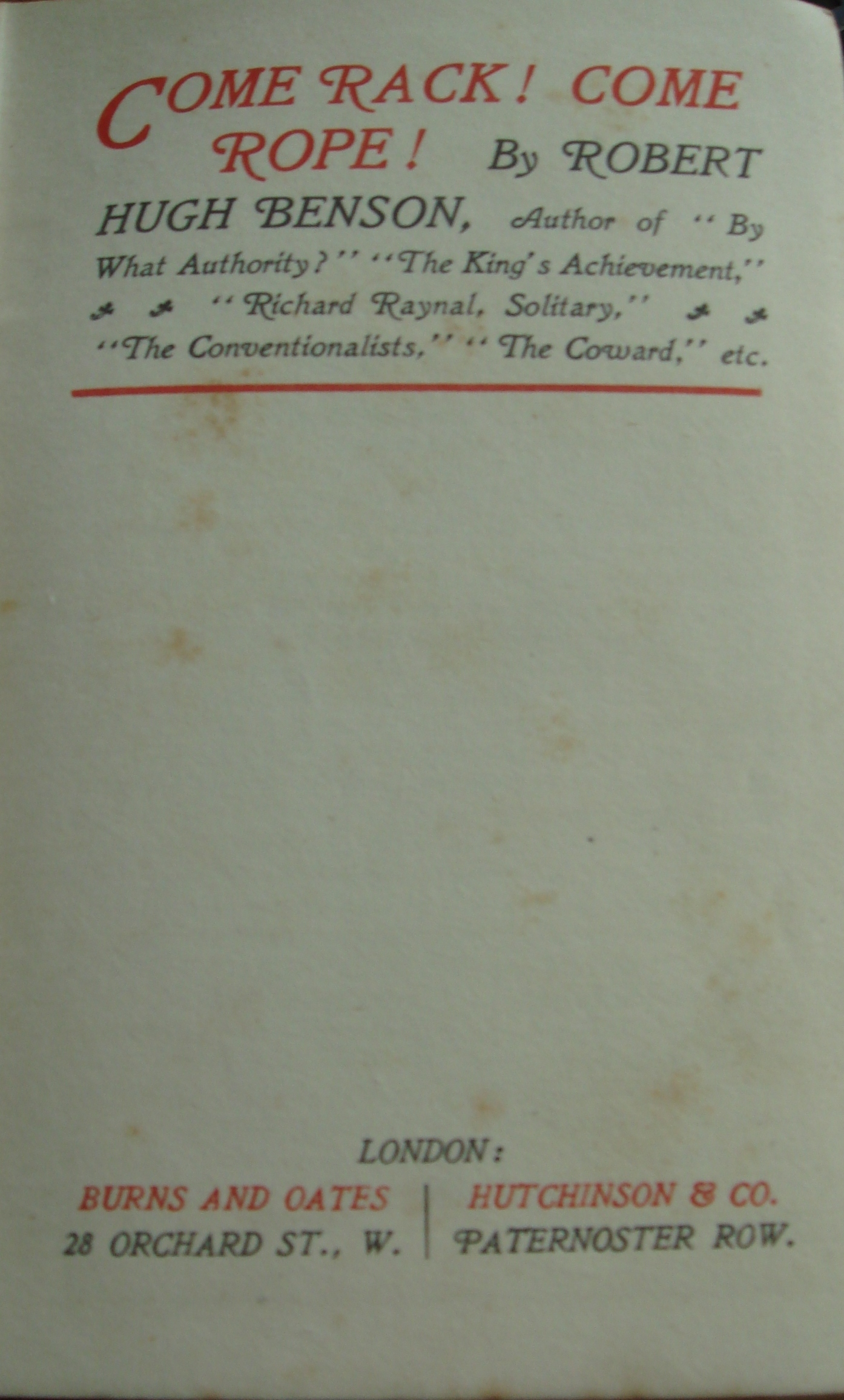
Title page of the first edition

Seventeen-year-old Robin Audrey's recusant Catholic father has announced that he can no longer bear the pressure and fines and will take communion in the Anglican Church at Easter, and expects Robin to do the same. Robin is unwilling, and his fiancée, Marjorie Manners, urges him to leave the area for Easter, to avoid the situation.

Robin confides his troubles to his friend Anthony Babington, a Catholic who is fanatically devoted to the imprisoned, Catholic Mary, Queen of Scots. While out riding, the two meet Mr. Garlick, who introduces them to the newly ordained Mr. Simpson and his travelling companion Mr. Ludlam, telling them that Mr. Simpson will say Mass the following Sunday. Robin realises that he must not mention this to his father.

Marjorie is tormented by the possibility that God is calling Robin to the priesthood. She does not want to stand in the way, but is unsure whether such thoughts come from God or her own imagination. She is afraid to mention it to Robin, yet feels she should at least sow a seed in his mind. On Easter Sunday, Marjorie tells Robin her thoughts, promising that she will marry him if he wishes, but saying that if it is God's will that Robin should be a priest, she will not hold him for a day. Robin tells her that he cannot make that sacrifice.

The following week, Robin meets Anthony, who hints at some enterprise to restore the Catholic Faith to England, and urges Robin to join him and his friends. Unsure of what Anthony's secret enterprise involves, he tells Anthony he cannot decide immediately. Returning home, his father angrily demands to know his intentions. Robin begs his father not to pressure him, but to give him time; his father gives him until Pentecost.

That night, unable to sleep, Robin hears the noise of horses and sees Mr. Simpson setting out with two other men. The sight of the priest risking his life to serve God and bring consolation to souls inspires Robin to make the decision against which he has been fighting. He wakes his father and gives his answer: "It is that I must go to Rheims and be a priest".

=== Part II ===
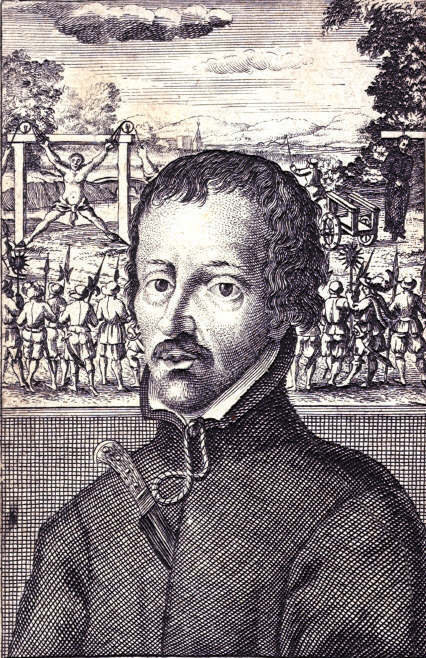
Saint Edmund Campion appears and is mentioned frequently in the novel.

Two years later, Anthony Babington visits Marjorie and tells her that he must go to London to meet a priest called Ballard. He urges Marjorie to come with him to meet Ballard and other priests so she may better recognise and assist them if they come to Derbyshire. He also mentions that Robin will be there, though not yet a priest. Marjorie agrees to come.

In London, Marjorie meets Edmund Campion, one of the most hunted priests in the kingdom, famous for his preaching. Campion explains his position of mixing boldly with the crowd to avoid suspicion, rather than hiding behind locked doors. He takes the group to see the Tower of London and the notorious priest-hunter and torturer Richard Topcliffe. They catch a glimpse of Queen Elizabeth, of whom Campion speaks with gentleness and loyalty. Campion discusses the content of his forthcoming pamphlet, "Decem Rationes" ("Ten Reasons"), against the validity of the Anglican Church.

Marjorie asks Robin for prayers and advice, wondering if she should leave the country and become a nun upon her mother's death. Robin promises to pray for her, but reminds her that he is not yet a priest, and gives no advice.

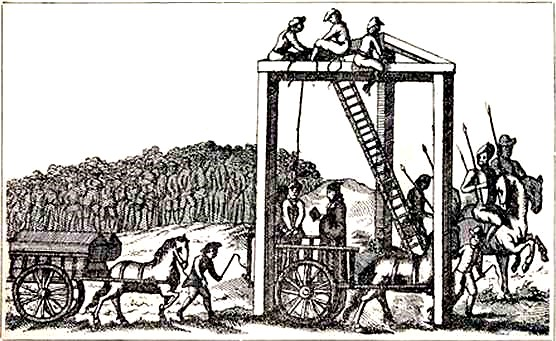
Tyburn, where Edmund Campion was martyred.

A year later, Marjorie is with her sick mother when Anthony Babington arrives and furiously tells Marjorie that Campion, Sherwine and Brian were hanged, drawn and quartered at Tyburn three days previously; they had been racked continuously and died praying for the Queen.

The next day, Marjorie's mother is dying, and Marjorie sends for a priest. When her mother's condition worsens, Marjorie tells her that there is no priest and urges her to make an Act of Contrition. When Mr. Simpson arrives two hours later, She informs him of the martyrdom of Father Campion and his companions. Mr. Simpson is seized with fear that shames and disgusts him, but cannot overcome it.

The following summer, Marjorie meets a young Catholic carpenter called Hugh Owen. He builds a special hiding place for priests at Marjorie's house. He tells her of how much he was inspired by Campion, and that he thinks he will die for his faith some day.

Some time later, Marjorie is injured near Robin's old home, and Mr. Audrey takes her into the house. He asks when Robin will be ordained, and she tells him that if Robin has not told him that, she cannot. He tells her that he is now a magistrate, and that Robin will have no mercy from him. He warns her that the authorities are watching Catholics such as the FitzHerberts. She tells him that it is not too late to repent, and that his duty to God is higher than his duty as a magistrate.

=== Part III ===
Robin, now a priest, returns to England and meets Anthony Babington, who confides to him the details of the enterprise he had hinted at before. Anthony and others intend to kill the Queen and set the imprisoned Mary, Queen of Scots, on the throne. He tells how they have been helped by Gilbert Gifford, and how they send messages to Mary. Robin begs him to give up the plot, saying that it is against God's law. He is also uncertain of Gifford's trustworthiness. Robin tells Anthony that he cannot give him absolution as long as Anthony intends to kill the Queen, but will regard the conversation as under the seal of confession, and warns Anthony not to speak about it otherwise, as it would be his duty to inform the authorities.

A few days later, Robin receives a letter from Anthony, saying that he has been betrayed and is being watched at every point, and that Mr. Gifford has been a traitor all along. He begs Robin to deliver a message to Mary. Anthony and his companions are arrested soon after.

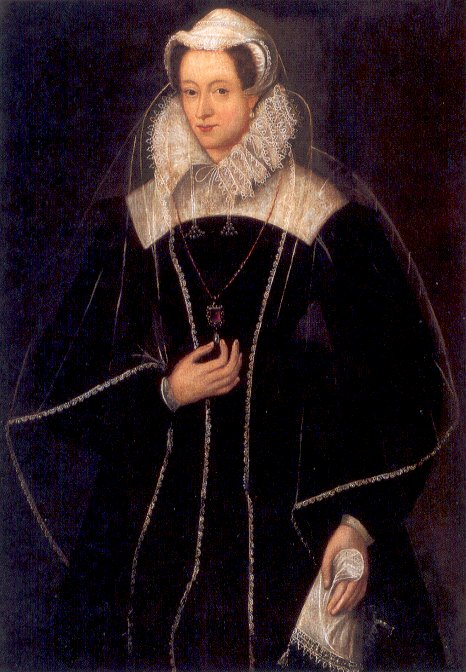
Mary, Queen of Scots

Robin makes his way to Chartley Hall, where Mary is held captive. He speaks to her apothecary, a Catholic called Mr. Bourgoign, and tells him that he is a priest and has a message for Mary. Mr. Bourgoign presents Robin to Sir Amyas Paulet, Mary's jailer, as one who may be able to help Mary's health. Sir Amyas reluctantly allows Robin to see Mary alone for a few minutes, and Robin hears her confession and gives her Holy Communion. She declares herself innocent of the plot against Elizabeth.

Marjorie receives a message asking for Robin to hear Mary's confession again before her execution. Though tempted not to deliver the message because of the risk of Robin's arrest, she remembers how her own mother, when dying, cried out for a priest, and thinks of the guilt and heartlessness of one who would keep the priest away from a person near death. She calls Robin, tells him that she nearly destroyed the letter, and prays that God will keep him safe. Robin is unable to gain access to Mary, but watches her execution.

A year later, Robin and a group of Catholics gather in Marjorie's parlour to discuss the latest news. Mr. Simpson has been captured and is awaiting trial. He is beginning to falter, and there is real fear that he will apostatise. Marjorie hopes to visit him to encourage him to remain firm, but her friends urge her not to, lest she draw attention to herself and endanger her work in harbouring priests.

A month later, Robin is with Mr. Ludlam and Mr. Garlick, now priests. They hear men coming to surround the house and hide in the priest holes. Mr. Ludlam and Mr. Garlick are discovered and arrested, but Robin is not found. He makes his way to Marjorie, who arranges for him to hide in a shepherd's hut. While there, Robin receives a note from Marjorie telling him that Mr. Ludlam and Mr. Garlick had been put in jail with Mr. Simpson, perhaps hoping that he would convince them to apostatise; however, the priests had instead persuaded Mr. Simpson to return to the Catholic faith, and the three had been tried, condemned, and executed.

Robin, feeling that he is being watched, leaves his hut and makes his way back to Marjorie's house. They hear horses, and she urges him to hide in the priest hole. Mr. Audrey arrives with men to search the house for a rumoured priest. Marjorie faints before she can inform him that it is his son. Embarrassed, Mr. Audrey tries to end the search as quickly as possible, and is secretly relieved that nothing has been found. His men, however, are suspicious, and insist on searching further. They find the priest hole and capture Robin, and Mr. Audrey has a fit.

Robin is thought to have been involved in the Babington plot, and to have gained access to the Queen of Scots. Robin is tortured for three days while being interrogated by Topcliffe, but betrays nothing. He is then tried and is sentenced to be hanged, drawn, and quartered. He is offered his life if he will conform and attend Anglican services, but refuses. He sees Marjorie and urges her not to leave the country to become a nun, but rather to serve God by remaining in England and continuing to assist priests.

A large crowd gathers for the execution, as the exciting story of the young priest, taken by his own father in the house of his former fiancée, draws far more interest than an ordinary hanging. Old Mr. Audrey is believed to be still ill, not having fully recovered from his fit, and there are rumours that Marjorie will be present at the execution. Robin makes a final speech, proclaiming his innocence of treason, and praying for Queen Elizabeth. He sees his father in the crowd, apparently penitent, and says the formula of absolution.

== Period covered ==
No dates are given in the book, but the story begins in winter shortly after 26 December, Saint Stephen's Day, on which Robin's father declared his intention to leave the Catholic Church. Later, on the following Easter Day, news is received of the martyrdom of John Nelson (February 1578). Part II begins in autumn, two years after Robin has gone to Rheims, and Marjorie goes to London around Christmas time. The following Christmas, she hears that Father Campion has just been executed. His execution took place on 1 December 1581. The following summer, when Hugh (Nicholas) Owen is working on hiding places at Padley and in Marjorie's house, people talk of the recent executions of Mr. Ford, Mr. Shert, and Mr. Johnson. All three were executed on 28 May 1582.

When Robin arrives back in England as a newly ordained priest, it is just days before the arrest of Anthony Babington, which took place in August 1586. Robin's first visit to Marjorie following his ordination is in November, just two months after the execution of Babington on 20 September 1586. His attempt to see Queen Mary a second time is just around the time of her execution (8 February 1587). Robin hides with Mr. Ludlam and Mr. Garlick at the time of their arrest. They were executed on 24 July 1588. Robin is arrested and executed shortly after. The book ends with Robin's death, but Part II mentions that Marjorie "was a middle-aged woman before the news came to her of [Owen's] death upon the rack." Nicholas Owen (incorrectly called "Hugh Owen" in the book) died on the rack in 1606.
