= Nicholas Fitzherbert =

- Born: 1550 prob. Padley, Derbyshire
- Died: 1612; Florence
- Education: Exeter College, Oxford, University of Douai
- Occupation: Secretary
- Parent: John Fitzherbert

Nicholas Fitzherbert (1550 – 6 November 1612) was an English recusant gentleman who served as secretary to Cardinal William Allen and was found guilty of treason due to his Catholicism. He was the second son of John Fitzherbert of Padley, Derbyshire. Fitzherbert was the grandson of the judge Sir Anthony Fitzherbert (1470–1538), and first cousin to the Jesuit Thomas Fitzherbert. Whilst he was abroad, two priests were arrested at his father's house; they are now saints after becoming martyrs to their faith. Fitzherbert's lands were forfeit, and he was obliged to spend his life abroad. He was buried in Florence.

== Biography ==
Fitzherbert matriculated at Exeter College, Oxford, where his name appears in the matriculation register as a senior undergraduate member of the college in 1571 and 1572. However he would not have been able to obtain a degree because of his religion, and therefore like many he went abroad in order that he might practice his Catholic religion.

He finally matriculated in the University of Douai before studying law at Bologna in 1580. During his absence from England he was found guilty of treason on 1 January 1580, on account of his zeal for the Catholic cause, and especially for his activity in raising funds for the English College at Rheims.

Fitzherbert settled in Rome, and received from Pope Gregory XIII an allowance of ten golden scudi a month. In 1587, Dr William Allen (who had founded the English College, Douai, in 1568) became a cardinal, and Fitzherbert became his secretary and continued to reside in his household till the cardinal's death in 1594.

In 1595, Gilotti of Rome published Fitzherbert's Latin translation of the poet Giovanni della Casa's Italian language treatise on manners, Il Galateo (1558).

Fitzherbert strenuously opposed the policy adopted by Robert Parsons, SJ, in reference to English Catholic affairs. An instance of this is recorded in the diary of Roger Baynes, a former secretary to Cardinal Allen:

Father Parsons returned from Naples to Rome, 5 October 1598. All the English in Rome came to the College to hear his reasons against Mr. Nicholas Fitzherbert.

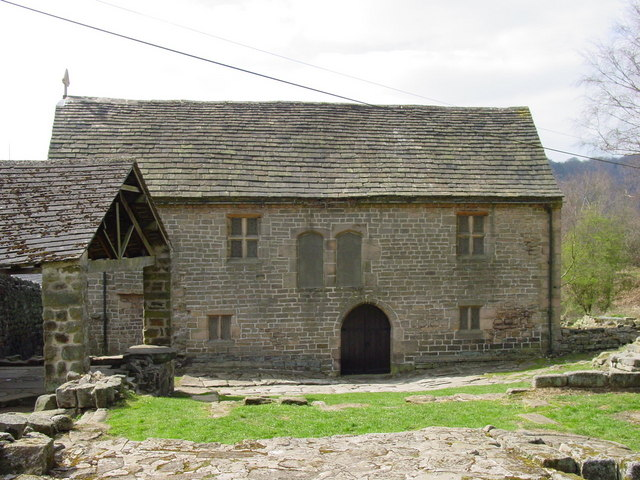
The remains of Padley Hall is now a chapel restored in 1933.

During his absence, his manor and hall at Padley had been seized in 1589 following the arrest of two priests who had been caught by chance when the manor was searched for Fitzherbert's father, John. The two priests would be held at Derby Gaol before being hanged drawn and quartered for treasonous activities. By February 1603–4, James I had made a grant to Henry Butler and two others, and their heirs, to make use of the Fitzherbert properties at Padley.

Padley Hall eventually fell into ruin, but part of the remains were restored into a chapel (pictured).

== Honours ==
Fitzherbert was never induced to take holy orders. When a proposal was made in 1607 to send a bishop to England, Fitzherbert was mentioned by Father Augustine, Prior of the English monks at Douay, as a worthy of becoming a bishop, but he considered himself unworthy of even the lowest ecclesiastical orders.

On Cardinal Allen's death, recommendations were made to Philip II of Spain to note who should receive any of the King's generosity. The note records that:

Nicholas Fierberti, copyist and servant from the beginning of the cardinaliate. A gentleman of very noble birth whose relatives have suffered much for their Catholic faith ... His father died in imprisonment of 26 years for the faith, and his uncle also left this life in prison for the same cause, after having been incarcerated for 32 years continuously.

Fitzherbert accidentally drowned while attempting to cross a brook, a few miles south of Florence, on 6 November 1612 on his way to Rome. He was buried in the Benedictine abbey of the Badia at Florence.

== Publications ==
- Della Casa, Giovanni, Ioannis Casae Galathaeus, sive de Moribus, Liber Italicus. A Nicolao Fierberto Anglo-Latine expressus, Rome, Gilotti, 1595, 8vo. Dedicated to Didacus de Campo, chamberlain to Clement VIII. Reprinted in Padua, 1728, 8vo.
- Oxoniensis in Anglia Academiae Descriptio, Rome, 1602, 8vo, dedicated to Bernardinus Paulinus, datary to Clement VIII. Reprinted by Thomas Hearne in vol. ix. of Leland's Itinerary, 1712.
- De Antiquitate et continuatione religionis in Anglia et de Alani Cardinalis vita libellus Rome, 1608 and 1638, 8vo, dedicated to Pope Paul V. The biography was reprinted at Antwerp, 1621, 8vo, and in Thomas Francis Knox, Letters and Memorials of Cardinal Allen, (London) 1882, pp. 3–20.
