= Padley Chapel =

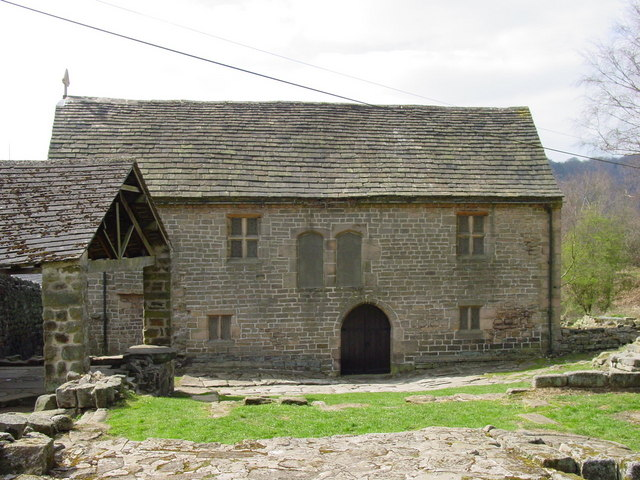
- The chapel and remains of Padley Hall

- Location within Derbyshire

General information
- Location: Grindleford, Derbyshire, England
- Coordinates: 53.3070°N 1.6311°W

Listed Building – Grade I
- Official name: Padley Chapel
- Designated: 29 September 1951
- Reference no.: 1335033

Scheduled monument
- Official name: Padley Hall: a medieval great house
- Designated: 29 January 1998
- Reference no.: 1017587

Padley Chapel is a building in Grindleford, England, on the site of the former Padley Hall (or Padley Manor). It is a Grade I listed building.

== Padley Hall ==
Padley Hall was a large double courtyard house where, in 1588, two Catholic priests (Nicholas Garlick and Robert Ludlam) were discovered. At the time to be a Catholic priest, ordained abroad was deemed treason; the two were tried and found guilty, two weeks later, they were hanged, drawn and quartered in Derby. They became known as the 'Padley Martyrs'. The house today is mostly in ruins, and is a Scheduled Monument. Garlick’s head was by tradition buried in the graveyard of Tideswell parish church, but there is no evidence of this.

== Chapel ==
Part of Padley Hall—probably originally the central gatehouse range—survives, and in 1933 was converted to a Catholic chapel in honour of the martyrs. The chapel is a Grade I listed building which stands not far from the railway line, a short distance west of Grindleford railway station. A pilgrimage takes place every year in July.

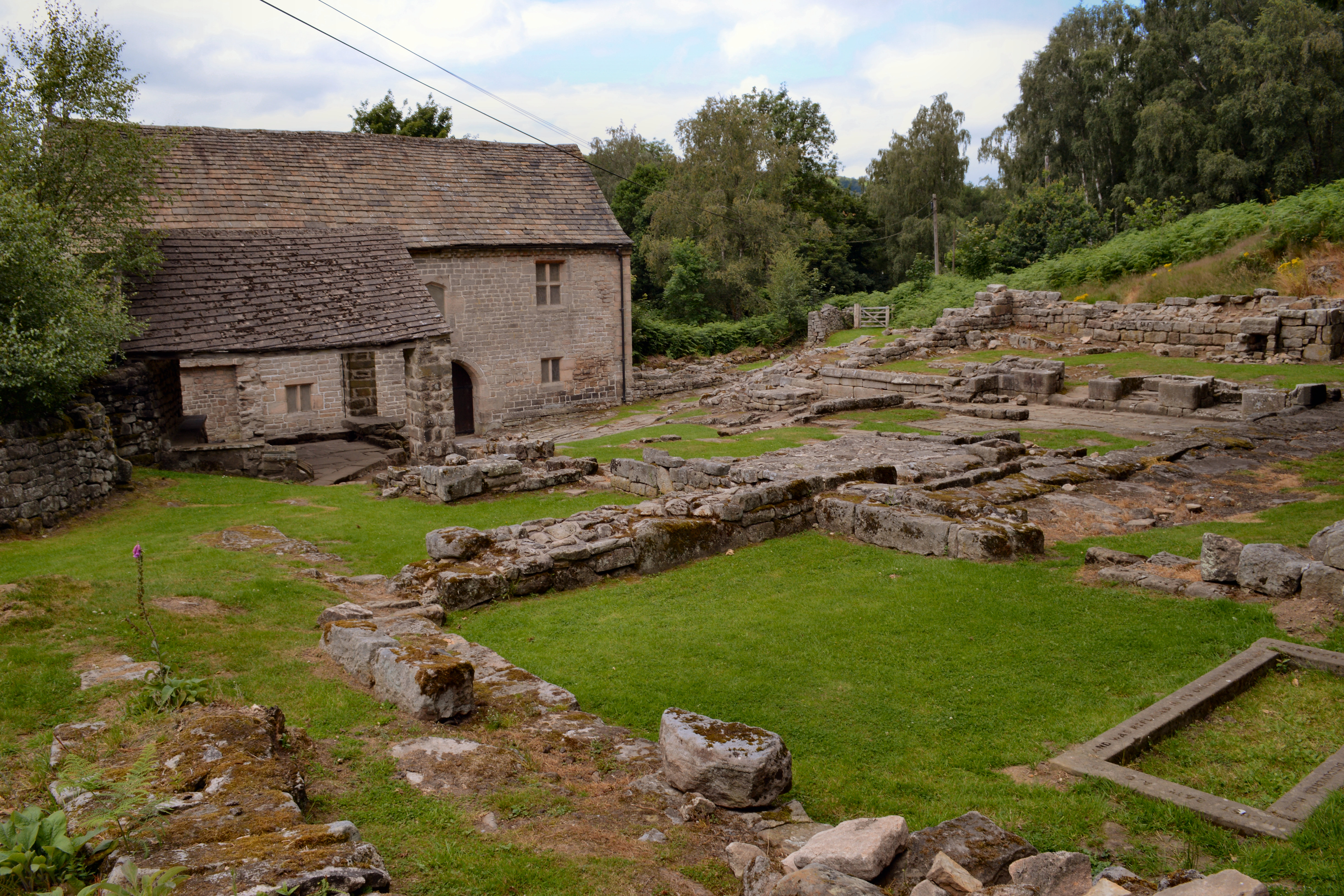
Padley Manor and chapel

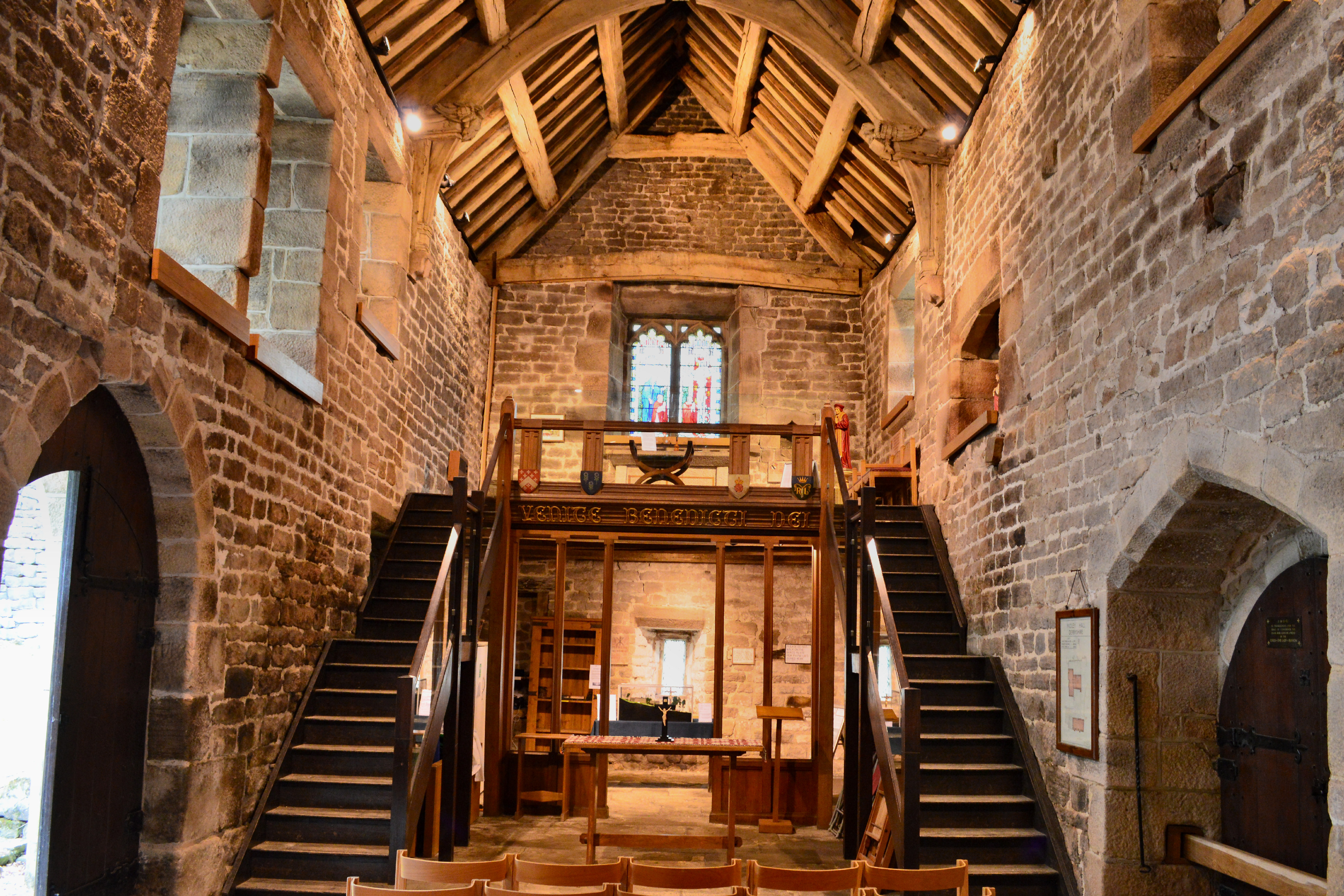
Interior

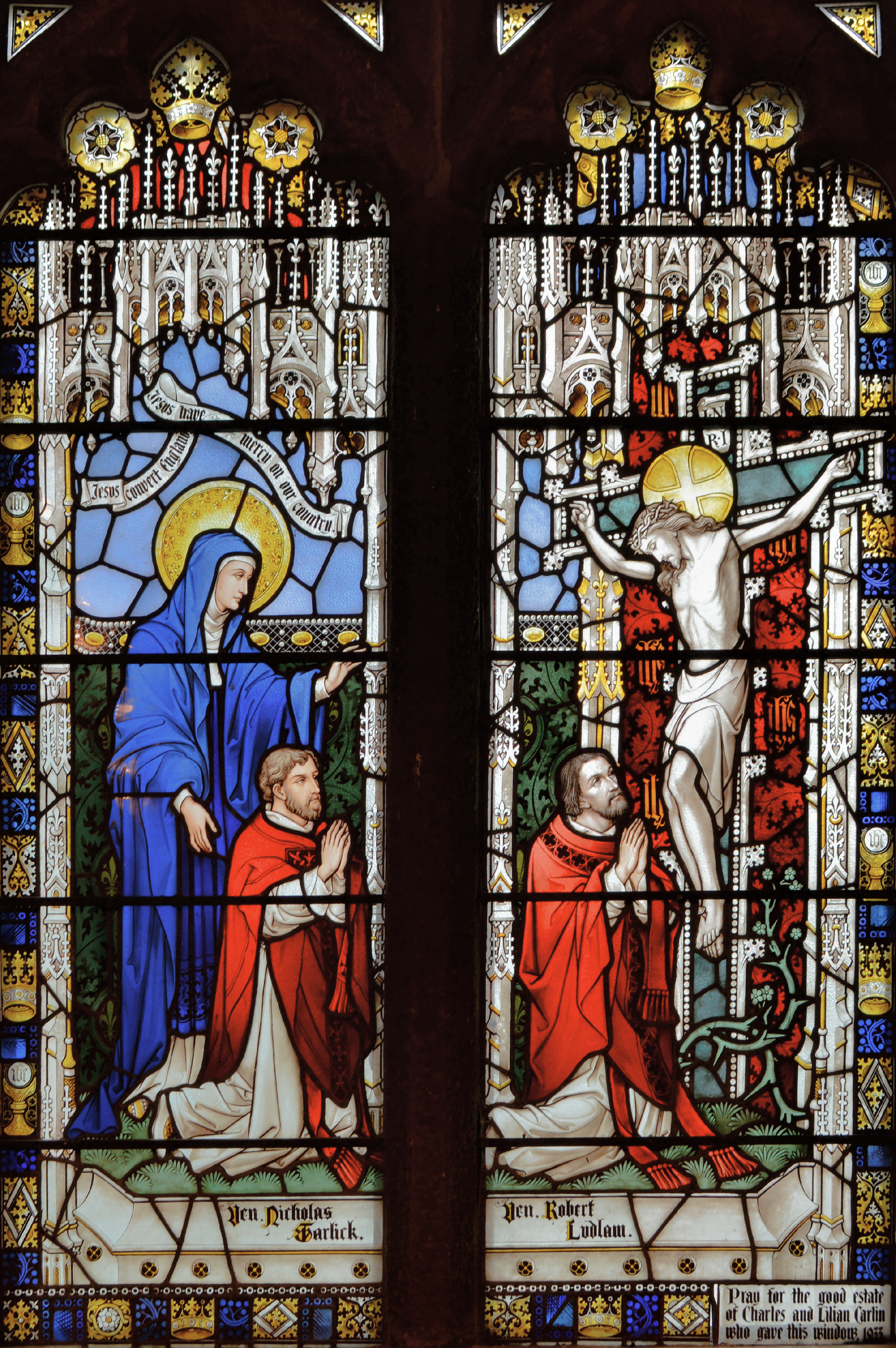
Memorial window

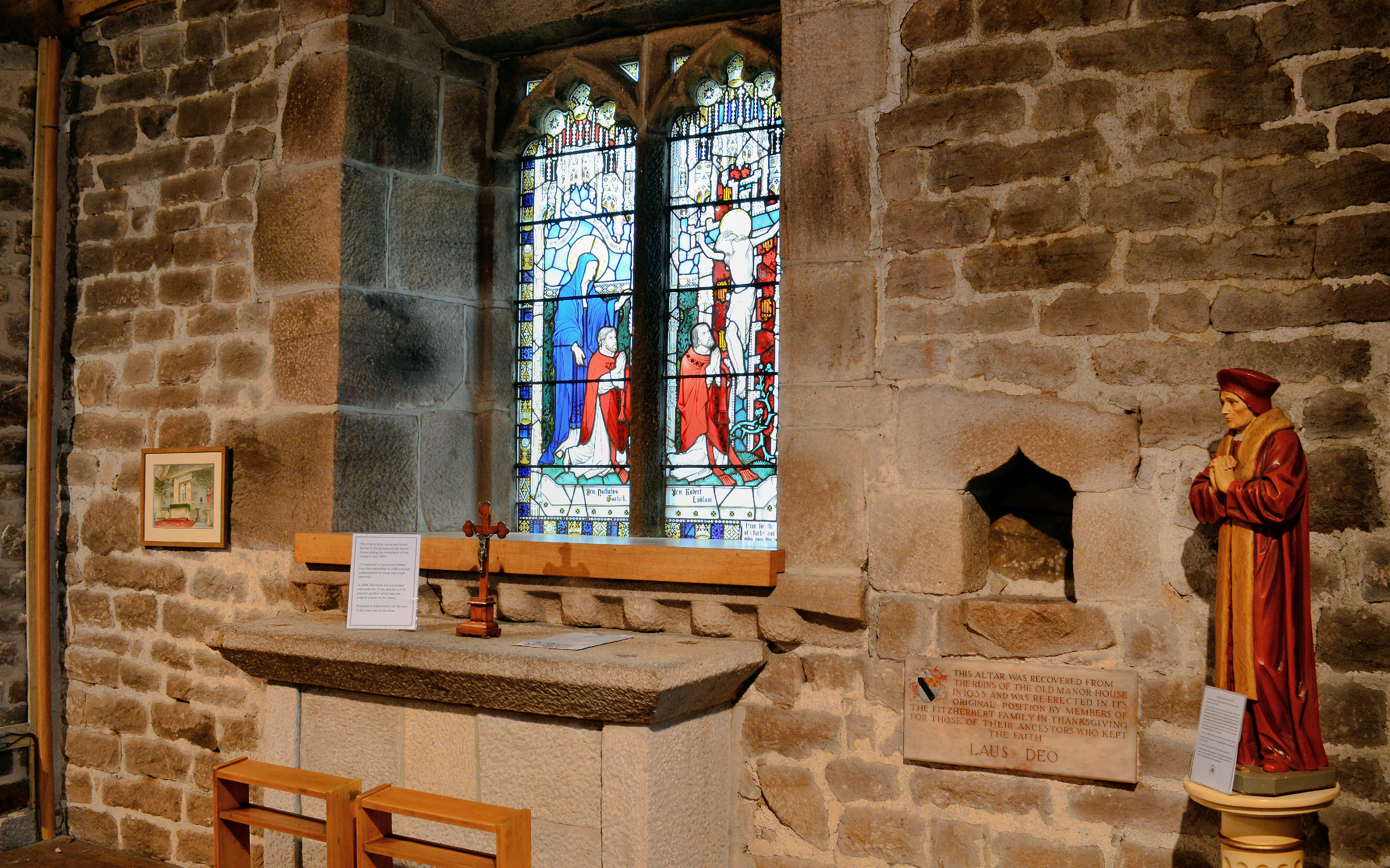
The altar

== See also ==
- Grade I listed churches in Derbyshire
- Grade I listed buildings in Derbyshire
- Listed buildings in Grindleford
