= Padley Hall =

Former Elizabethan manor house in Derbyshire, England

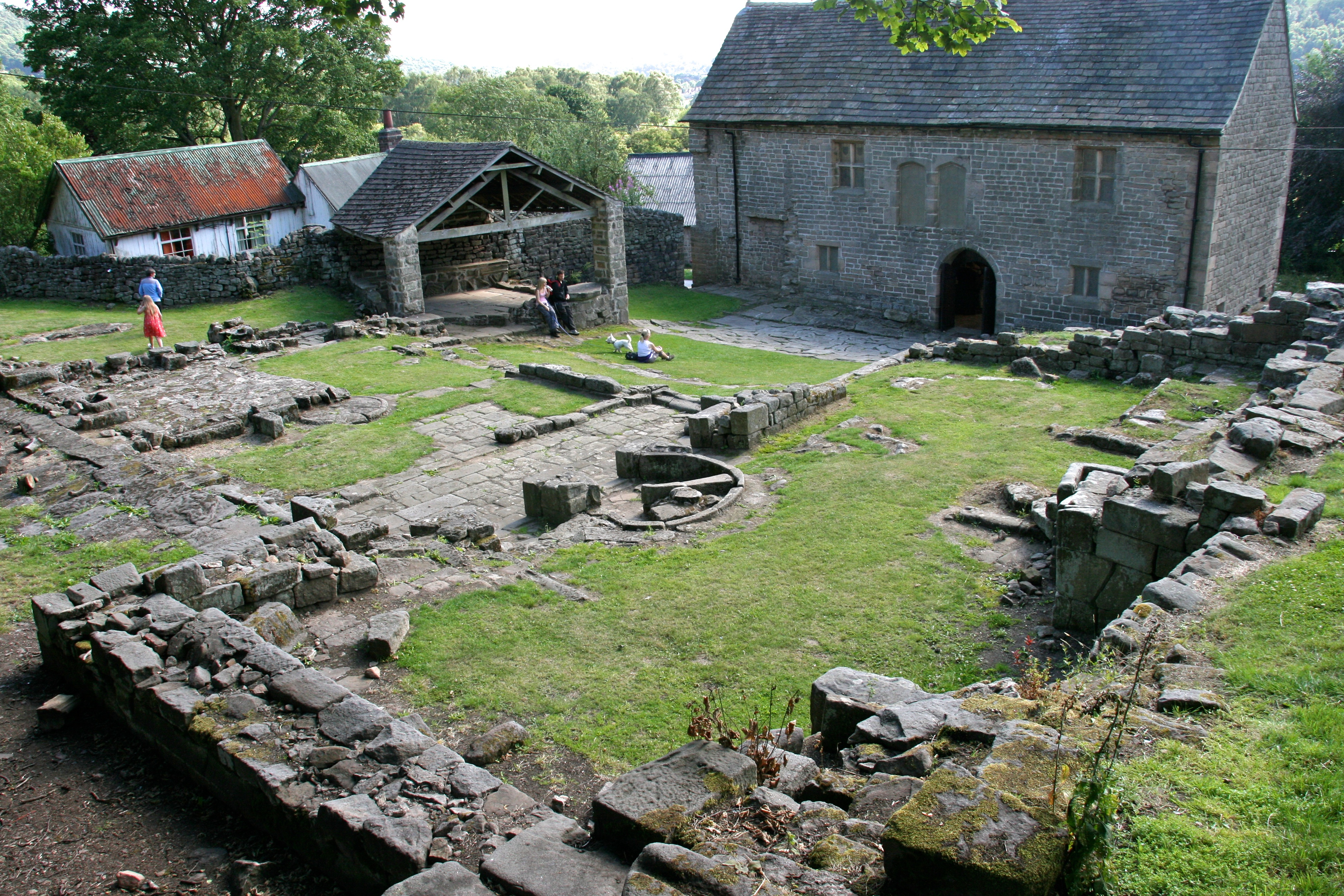
- Padley Chapel and ruins of Padley Hall
- Interactive map of Padley Hall
- 53.3070°N 1.6311°W
- Periods: Medieval
- Location: Grindleford
- Region: Derbyshire, England

Site notes
- Condition: Standing remains
- Public access: Public footpath

Scheduled monument
- Official name: Padley Hall: a medieval great house
- Type: Settlement
- Designated: 29 January 1998
- Reference no.: 1017587

Padley Hall (or Padley Manor) was an Elizabethan great house overlooking the River Derwent near Grindleford, Derbyshire, England. The remains of the hall today are mostly just foundation walls. The site is a protected Scheduled Monument. Not to be confused with 17th-century Padley Hall near Ripley.

Padley Hall was a large double courtyard house dating back to the 14th century, although it was built on the site of an earlier Norman manor house. William the Conqueror gave the Padley estate to his supporter the head of the De Bernac family. The Bernac family changed their name to Padley after the estate. The hall was built for the Padley family and subsequently passed onto the local aristocratic Eyre family, when Joan Padley married Robert Eyre (Sheriff of Nottinghamshire, Derbyshire and the Royal Forests in 1481). It became the residence of Sir Thomas Fitzherbert through his marriage to Anne Eyre in 1534.

The Fitzherbert family were devout Catholics, refusing to attend the services of the Church of England. Sir Thomas had given the hall to his younger brother John by 1588. In July 1588, the hall was raided and two Catholic priests (Nicholas Garlick and Robert Ludlum) were discovered hiding within the walls. Two weeks later they were found guilty of high treason (being ordained priests in England) and they were hanged, drawn and quartered in Derby. Their corpses were displayed on poles on St. Mary’s Bridge. They became known as the 'Padley Martyrs'. John Fitzherbert was imprisoned and died in 1590. Sir Thomas Fitzherbert had spent 32 years in prison for his beliefs and died in the Tower of London in 1591. Padley Manor was confiscated by the Crown before being returned later to the Fitzherbert family. William Fitzherbert inherited the estate in 1649 but hefty recusancy fines and family debts forced him to sell the hall, which gradually fell into disrepair. Stones were taken from the hall ruins to construct two barns.

Padley Chapel was the former gatehouse to the hall and was used as a farm building following the closure of the hall. The building is still intact and in 1933 it was purchased by the Diocese of Nottingham and converted into a Catholic chapel in honour of the martyrs. A pilgrimage to Padley Chapel began in 1892 in honour of the executed martyrs and it still takes place in July each year from nearby Grindleford railway station. The chapel is a Grade I listed building.

The National Trust's Longshaw Estate and Padley Gorge would have been part of the original Padley estate.
