= Stoke Hall, Derbyshire =

Stoke Hall
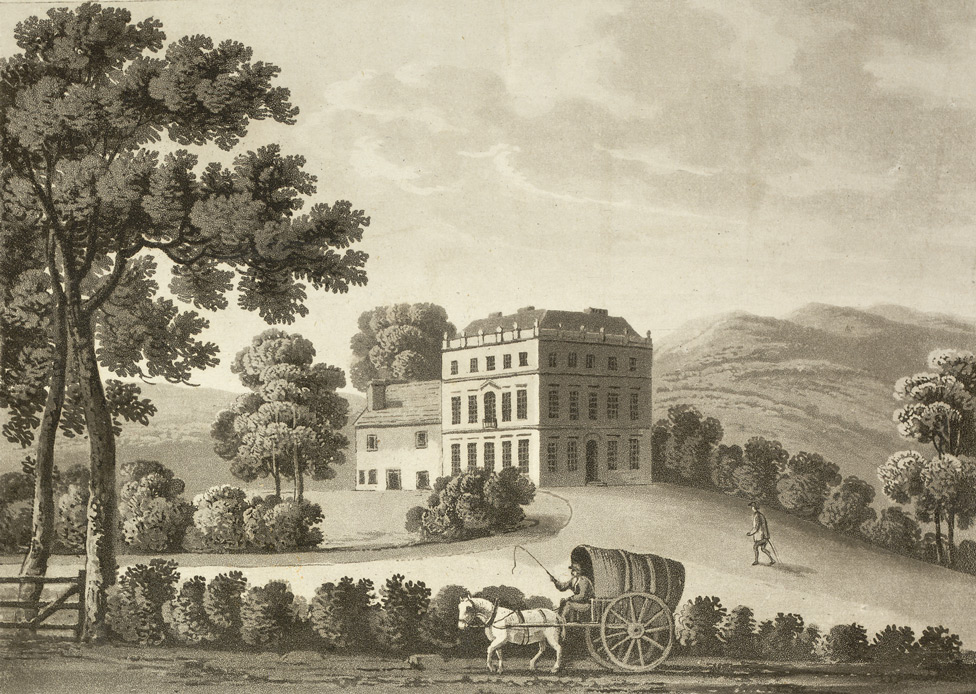
- 1807 aquatint engraved by T. Cartwright

- Location within Derbyshire

General information
- Type: Mansion
- Architectural style: Palladian (interior) and Georgian (exterior)
- Location: Calver, Derbyshire, England
- Coordinates: 53.2817°N 1.6411°W
- Ordnance Survey: SK2402776138
- Years built: c. 1757
- Completed: 18th century

Design and construction
- Architect: James Paine
- Main contractor: William Booth
- Designations: Grade II* listed

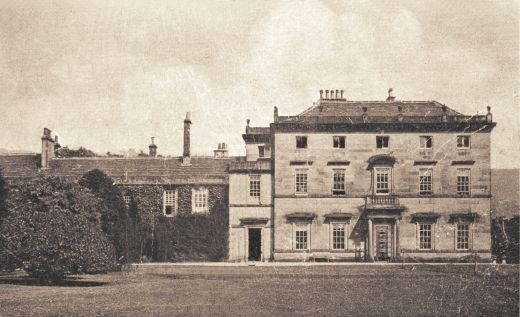
1937 postcard

Stoke Hall is a Grade II* listed 30-room Georgian Palladian mansion near the village of Grindleford, Derbyshire, England, whose restoration featured on the BBC series Restoration Home and the follow-up Restoration Home - One Year On.

== History ==
Stoke was listed in the Domesday Book. The first known occupant was Gerbert de Stoke, in 1204. Stoke was held by the Greys of Codnor and sold in the 1460s to the Barlows of Barlow Hall.

In the 17th century the estate was owned by William Cavendish, 1st Duke of Newcastle. Early in the next century, it passed to the Rev John Simpson, who commissioned the current building following his acquisition of the estate upon his marriage to the granddaughter of Admiral Benbow. The house was designed by James Paine and built c. 1757 by William Booth. Both men also worked at nearby Chatsworth House. It was later described by Nicholas Pevsner as ‘quite stately'.

In about 1850 Simpson's descendant Henry Bridgeman, 5th Earl of Bradford sold the estate to the Hunter family of Greystones. who lived there until at least the late 1930s.

The Hall was later occupied by the industrialist Emile Viner, until 1950/1, and was then purchased by Hedley and Ida Abson, becoming a family home. After Hedley and Ida died, the Hall was sold in 1972, and subsequently used as a hotel and restaurant. It was sold at auction to Richard Jowitt in 1982.

After an incomplete 25-year restoration, Jowitt died, and the house was offered for sale in 2008, with a guide price of £2.75 million, but not sold until 2009 for £2.5 million to a local couple, Steve and Natalie Drury, who have spent a further £1.5 million completing the restoration. Their restoration was shown by the BBC in 2011 and 2012.

The main three-storey Georgian house includes the reception hall, five reception rooms, kitchen, breakfast room, master suite, five bedrooms, two bathrooms and a staff apartment. There is also an older north wing. The total floorspace is 14,962 square feet (1,390.0 m^{2}). The drawing room has a chimneypiece by Grinling Gibbons. The building was Grade II* listed on 8 August 1985.

The River Derwent marks the 22.5 acres (9.1 ha) estate's eastern boundary.

== See also ==
- Grade II* listed buildings in Derbyshire Dales
- Listed buildings in Grindleford
