= Humphrey Berisford =

Humphrey Berisford (probably died ca. 1588) was an English recusant who was imprisoned for his adherence to Roman Catholicism, dying in prison.

== Biography ==
Christopher Green's 'F' manuscript, now in the English College, Rome, says of Berisford that he was a gentleman of Derbyshire, the son of an esquire, whose father was a Protestant, and that he studied at Douay for about two years.

Of Berisford's confession of faith, Green says that on his return from Douai,

...his father employed him about his suit in law, and having once a suit against one, who fearing to be cast by his means, accused him before the judge for a recusant. When the cause should have been heard the judge examined him. He constantly professed his faith. Then the judge offered both favour to his cause and liberty if he would but only say he would go to their church; which he utterly refused. Therefore he was committed to prison where he remained seven [a gap here] then died a prisoner".

Joseph Gillow suggests that the word missed out by Green is "years" and states that Berisford died in Derby Gaol in about 1588.
