= Listed buildings in Grindleford =

Grindleford is a civil parish in the Derbyshire Dales district of Derbyshire, England. The parish contains 26 listed buildings recorded in the National Heritage List for England. Of these, one is listed at Grade I, the highest of the three grades; one is at Grade II*, the middle grade, and the others are at Grade II, the lowest grade. The parish contains the village of Grindleford and the surrounding countryside. Most of the listed buildings are houses, cottages, farmhouses and associated structures. The other listed buildings include a former gatehouse converted into a chapel, two bridges, a milestone and a milepost, a former cotton mill, a former toll house, and another chapel.

== Key ==
| Grade | Criteria |
|---|---|
| I | Buildings of exceptional interest, sometimes considered to be internationally important |
| II* | Particularly important buildings of more than special interest |
| II | Buildings of national importance and special interest |

== Buildings ==
| Name and location | Photograph | Date | Notes | Grade |
|---|---|---|---|---|
| Padley Chapel; 53.30699°N 1.63116°W | | 14th century | The chapel, originally the gatehouse to Padley Hall, is in gritstone on a low chamfered plinth, with quoins, a decorated corbel table, and a stone slate roof with a cross finial. There are two storeys and four bays. The chapel contains arched doorways and windows of various types, including cross windows, mullioned windows, and slit windows. | I |
| Grindleford Bridge; 53.29677°N 1.63409°W | | 17th century | The bridge carries the B6521 road over the River Derwent. It is in gritstone and consists of three arches. On the north side the arches are semicircular, with voussoirs, rounded cutwaters with domed caps, a broad band course, and a parapet wall with rounded copings ending in octagonal piers. On the south side, the arches are stepped, the voussoirs are pointed, and the parapet is cambered. | II |
| Hazelford Hall; 53.31631°N 1.65178°W | | 17th century | The house, which was altered and extended in the 19th century, is in gritstone with quoins, and stone slate roofs with coped gables, moulded kneelers, and finials. There are two storeys, and an L-shaped plan. The east range is stepped, with four bays, and contains a doorway with a quoined surround and a hood mould. Most of the windows in both ranges are mullioned. On the north front is a two-storey gabled porch, the upper storey jettied. | II |
| Leam Cottage; 53.31394°N 1.65193°W | — | Late 17th century | The house, which was remodelled in the 18th century, is in gritstone with quoins, and stone slate roofs with coped gables and moulded kneelers. There are two storeys and four bays. The doorway has substantial jambs and a lintel, and most of the windows are mullioned. | II |
| Torr Farm; 53.31593°N 1.65763°W | | Late 17th century | A farmstead, consisting of a farmhouse, an attached stable range and cowhouse, a detached barn and outbuildings, and an enclosing wall. The farmhouse is in gritstone with quoins, and a roof of Welsh slate and stone slate with coped gables and kneelers. There are two storeys, a double-depth plan with two parallel ranges, and four bays. The attached range has two storeys and four bays. | II |
| Tythe House; 53.28140°N 1.64301°W | — | Late 17th century | A barn converted into a house, it is in gritstone, with quoins, and a stone slate roof with coped gables and moulded kneelers. There are two storeys, four bays, and a single-storey extension at each end. On the front is a segmental-arched opening, now glazed, and doorways, and in the upper floor are former taking-in doors. | II |
| Fern Cottage and outbuilding 53.30903°N 1.65132°W | — | Early 18th century | The house and attached outbuilding are in gritstone, with quoins, and a stone slate roof with coped gables and moulded kneelers, and two storeys. The house has an L-shaped plan, a front of two bays, and a rear wing. It contains a doorway with a massive surround and lintel, and mullioned windows. The outbuilding has three bays, one gabled and projecting, and contains a double-width opening, windows and hayloft doors with quoined surrounds. | II |
| Leam Farmhouse; 53.31236°N 1.65289°W | — | Mid 18th century | The farmhouse is in gritstone with quoins, and stone slate roofs with coped gables and moulded kneelers. There are two storeys and two bays. In the centre is a porch with a lean-to roof, and the windows are mullioned with two lights and casements. | II |
| Milestone west of Harper Lees; 53.31805°N 1.64744°W | — | Mid 18th century | The milestone is on the east side of the B6001 road. It consists of a plain stone slab with a rounded top, and is inscribed with the distances to Bakewell and Hathersage. | II |
| Padley Manor Farmhouse; 53.30671°N 1.63018°W | | Mid 18th century | The farmhouse is in gritstone with quoins and a stone slate roof. There are two storeys and three bays, and a later single-bay extension. On the front are two doorways with quoined surrounds and shallow arches under flat lintels, and the windows are mullioned. | II |
| Padley Mill; 53.30635°N 1.62521°W | | Mid 18th century | A water-powered cotton mill converted for residential use, it is in gritstone with quoins and a Welsh slate roof. There are two storeys and underwork, and three bays. In the underwork are three semicircular arches, and the windows above are two-light casements with arched heads cut into flat lintels. In the east gable end is a doorway approached by external steps. | II |
| Stoke Hall Cottages and The Rookery; 53.28168°N 1.64313°W | — | Mid 18th century | Originally the stables to Stoke Hall, and later converted for residential use, they are in gritstone on a plinth, with quoins, bands, and a hipped stone slate roof with coped gables at the rear. They are in two storeys and form a U-shaped plan around a courtyard. The main front has five bays, and there are two- and three-storey projecting towers in the centre and at the ends. Each tower has a moulded cornice and a pyramidal roof, and they are linked by a parapet balustrade. The doorways, which have fanlights, and the ground floor windows, which are sashes, are set in blind round-headed arches. | II |
| Cherry Cottage and attached dwelling 53.30888°N 1.64936°W | — | 1755 | A pair of houses at right angles, originally cottages and outbuildings. They are in gritstone with stone slate roofs. The southwest range has two storeys and five bays, three doorways with quoined surrounds and heavy lintels, two of the lintels with inscriptions and dates. The other range has two storeys over a basement and three bays, and a lower adjoining two-bay range. All the ranges have mullioned windows. | II |
| Stoke Hall; 53.28170°N 1.64114°W | | 1757 | A country house in gritstone, with a projecting eaves cornice on a corbelled band, a parapet with urns, and a hipped stone slate roof. There are two and a half storeys, fronts of five bays, and a two-storey north range with nine bays. The central doorway in the west front has Doric columns, an entablature, a segmental pediment, a splayed architrave, and a blind balustrade. The windows in the lower two floors are sashes, and in the top floor they are casements. | II* |
| Burbage Bridge; 53.32261°N 1.60918°W | | c. 1758 | The bridge carries the A6187 road over Burbage Brook. It was built as a turnpike road, and consists of a solid stone wall with buttresses, and is pierced by a culvert carrying the brook. The bridge has parapet walls with slab coping. | II |
| Leam Hall; 53.30854°N 1.64866°W | — | Late 18th century | A small country house in gritstone with quoins and a hipped stone slate roof. The main range has three storeys, and the extensions have two, and the southeast front has four bays. The porch has a shallow embattled parapet, and the windows are sashes. At the northeast end is a single-storey flat-roofed semicircular bay window with a parapet. | II |
| Stoke Cottage; 53.28842°N 1.64267°W | — | Late 18th century | The house, previously a mission house and an inn, is in gritstone with quoins, bands, and a stone slate roof with coped gables. There are two storeys and three bays, the middle bay projecting under a gable containing a round window, and later parallel ranges at the rear. In the centre is a doorway with a massive surround and a shallow bracketed hood, flanked by single-light windows. The other windows are mullioned. | II |
| Toll Bar Cottage; 53.29710°N 1.63366°W | | Late 18th century | Originally a toll house, later a private house, it is in gritstone with quoins and a stone slate roof. There are two storeys, a double-depth plan, and a front of three bays, the middle bay a two-story semicircular bay window. The other windows are mullioned, and in the south front is a blocked doorway with a massive lintel and surround and a window inserted. | II |
| Outbuilding northwest of Leam Hall; 53.30887°N 1.64909°W | — | 1777 | The former coach house is in gritstone with quoins and a hipped stone slate roof. There are two storeys and a basement, and a single-storey lean-to. The building contains a segmental-headed carriage opening, with a quoined surround and a dated keystone, and a mullioned window. In the lean-to is a doorway with a quoined surround and a stone staircase. | II |
| Oak Cottage, Derwent Cottage, Knowle Cottage, and Mill Cottage; 53.29953°N 1.62909°W | — | c. 1800 | Four houses converted from farm outbuildings, they are in gritstone, with hipped roofs of Welsh slate and stone slate. The houses have two storeys, and form two ranges at right angles with fronts of four bays. They contain a former segmental-arched opening, now infilled, mullioned windows, and three former pitching holes in the upper floor. | II |
| Nether Padley Farmhouse; 53.29931°N 1.62939°W | | c. 1800 | The farmhouse is in gritstone, on a plinth, with an eaves band, and has a roof of Welsh slate and stone slate with coped gables. There are three storeys and an L-shaped plan, the main range with a double-depth plan and three bays. In the southeast front is a doorway with a moulded surround, a semicircular fanlight, and a bracketed hood, and the windows are mullioned, containing sashes. | II |
| Longshaw Lodge; 53.31527°N 1.60476°W | | c. 1825 | A hunting lodge later divided into apartments, it is in gritstone, and has stone slate roofs with coped gables, moulded kneelers, and ball finials. There are two storeys and the northwest front has five gables of varying sizes, some linked by parapets. On the front are two canted bay windows, and a porch with a parapet, and a doorway with a four-centred arched head. The windows are mullioned or mullioned and transomed. At the rear is a four-storey square tower with moulded string courses and an embattled parapet. | II |
| Milepost southwest of Burbage Bridge; 53.31527°N 1.60476°W | | Early 19th century | The milepost is on the southeast side of the A6187 road. It is in cast iron and has a triangular plan and a swept top. On the faces are the distances to Hathersage, Castleton, Chapel-en-le-Frith, and Sheffield. | II |
| White Edge Lodge; 53.30313°N 1.60374°W | | Mid 19th century | The lodge, which was built for the Longshaw Estate, is in gritstone, with quoins, moulded string courses, and a stone slate roof with coped gables and moulded kneelers. There is a square plan, with each front gabled, two with finials, two storeys and attics, and a single bay on each side. The windows vary, they all have moulded surrounds, some have hood moulds, and on the northeast corner is a lean-to porch. | II |
| Chapel to Longshaw Lodge; 53.31506°N 1.60518°W | | 1890–91 | The chapel is in gritstone with quoins, a moulded eaves cornice, and a stone slate roof with moulded copings and kneelers. There are three bays, a gabled bellcote on the northeast gable, and the windows have pointed heads. | II |
| The Gables, terraces, walls and steps 53.30078°N 1.62343°W | — | 1912 | A house in Arts and Crafts style, built in gritstone with a roof of red tile, and moulded gable copings and kneelers. There are two storeys and an irregular plan, with a single-storey service wing at the northeast. The west front has five irregular bays, the central bay recessed and containing a porch, above which is a six-light mullioned window, and in the roof is an eight-light dormer. The flanking bays are gabled, the left bay containing a canted bay window. The principal entrance is in the north front and has a gabled porch. In the gardens to the south and west of the house are terraces with steps and walls in gritstone. | II |
