= Roger Baynes =

Roger Baynes (1546–1623) was secretary to Cardinal Allen and an author.

Baynes, secretary to Cardinal Allen, was born in England in 1546. In the reign of Queen Elizabeth he abjured the Protestant religion and proceeded to the English College, Reims, where he arrived on 4 July 1579. In that year he accompanied Dr. Allen to Rome, and when that divine was raised to the cardinalate he became his secretary and major-domo. After the cardinal's death he gave himself up to religious exercises. He died on 9 October 1623, and was buried in the English College, Rome, where a monument to his memory was erected. The epitaph styles him "nobilis Anglus", and states that "ex testamento centum montium loca in pios usus reliquit, prout ex actis d. Michaelis Angeli Cesi notarij constat".

He is the author of two excessively rare works, the first of which is entitled: "The Praise of Solitarinesse, Set down in the forme of a Dialogue, Wherein is conteyned a Discourse Philosophical of the lyfe Actiue and Contemplatiue. Imprinted at London by Francis Coldocke and Henry Bynneman, 1577. Qui nihil sperat, Nihil desperat" (4to). The dedication to the author's approved friend, Mr. Edward Dyer, and is signed Roger Baynes. The second is "The Baynes of Aqvisgrane, The I. Part & I. Volume, intitvled Variety. Contayning Three Bookes, in the forme of Dialogues, vnder the Titles following, Viz. Profit, Pleasvre, Honovr. Furnished with diuers things no lesse delightfull then beneficiall to be knowne and obserued. Related by Rog. Baynes Gent. a long Exile out of England, not for any temporall respects. Qui nihil sperat nihil desperat. Printed at Augusta in Germany, M.DC.XVII." (4to). A notice from the printer to the reader informs us that "this present Volume, and the rest that are to follow, though they have not come to the Presse till now, yet haue they byn written some yeares ago, in the tyme of the late Queene Elizabeth." Only the first book Of Profit appears to have been printed.
