= Robert Ludlam =

16th-century English priest and martyr

Blessed Robert Ludlam
- Born: c. 1551; Derbyshire
- Died: 24 July 1588; St Mary's Bridge; Derby, Kingdom of England
- Venerated in: Catholic Church
- Beatified: 22 November 1987 by John Paul II

Robert Ludlam (c. 1551 – 24 July 1588) was an English priest, martyred in the reign of Queen Elizabeth I. He was born around 1551, in Derbyshire. His father was a yeoman. He matriculated at St John's College, Oxford, in 1575, and remained there for two or three years, but left without taking a degree. He was admitted to the English College at Rheims on 25 November 1580, and the following September, he was ordained as a priest. He set out for England on 30 April 1582.

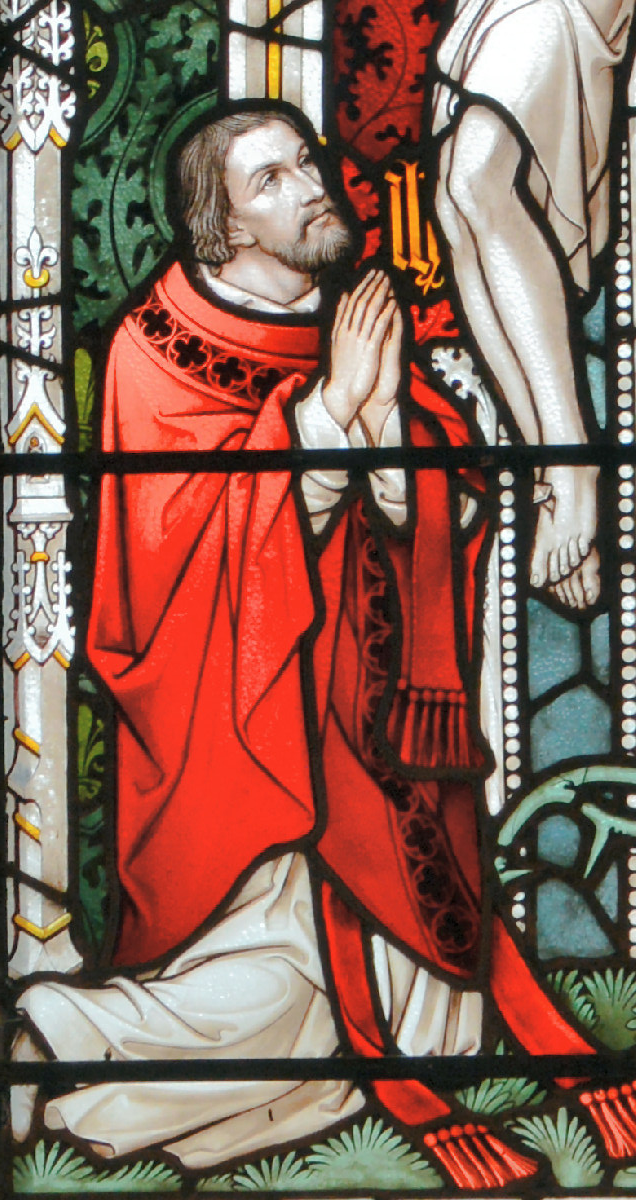
Padley Chapel, Robert Ludlam praying

Little is known of his ministry in England. An unnamed source, quoted in Hayward, says that he was

[a]t liberty in England six or seven years. He was a very mild man, did much good in the country; for that he did much travel, and was beloved.

On 12 July 1588, Robert Ludlam and fellow priest Nicholas Garlick were arrested at Padley, home of Catholic recusant, John Fitzherbert. The raid was made for the purpose of arresting Fitzherbert; the finding of two priests was an unexpected bonus. In Derby Gaol, Ludlam and Garlick met with another priest, Richard Simpson, who had been earlier condemned to death but had been granted a reprieve, either, as stated by most sources, including Richard Challoner, because he had given some hope that he would attend a Protestant service, or, as suggested by Sweeney, because the Queen may have given orders to halt the persecution of priests to remove the threat of invasion from Spain. Whether or not Simpson was wavering, it is certain that he remained firm after his meeting with Garlick and Ludlam. The three priests were tried on 23 July 1588, were found guilty of treason, and were sentenced to be hanged, drawn, and quartered. The sentence was carried out the next day, at St Mary's Bridge, in Derby. Ludlam was the last of the three to be executed, and, according to eyewitnesses, stood smiling while the execution of Garlick was being carried out, and smiled still when his own turn came. His last words, and the only words of his that are recorded, were Venite benedicti Dei ("Come, you blessed of God"), which he uttered just before he was thrown off the ladder.

Robert Ludlam, Nicholas Garlick, and Richard Simpson were declared venerable in 1888, and were among the eighty-five martyrs of England and Wales beatified by Pope John Paul II on 22 November 1987.

The gatehouse at Padley was turned into a chapel. An annual pilgrimage honouring the two martyrs began in the late 19th century. In 1999 the Robert Ludlam Theatre was opened in Derby.

== See also ==
- Douai Martyrs
