= Nicholas Garlick =

English Roman Catholic priest and martyr

Blessed Nicholas Garlick

Priest and Martyr
- Born: c. 1555; Dinting, Glossop, Derbyshire
- Died: 24 July 1588 (aged 32 - 33); St Mary's Bridge, Derby, Derbyshire
- Venerated in: Roman Catholic Church
- Beatified: 22 November 1987 by John Paul II
- Feast: 24 July, 22 November
- Attributes: knife, martyr's palm

Nicholas Garlick (c. 1555 – 24 July 1588) was an English Catholic priest, martyred in Derby in the reign of Queen Elizabeth I.

== Early life ==
He was born around 1555, near Dinting in Glossop, within the county of Derby. In January 1575 he matriculated at Gloucester Hall, now Worcester College, Oxford. Although he was described as "well seen in Poetry, Rhetoric, and philosophy," he remained at Oxford for only six months and left without taking a degree, perhaps because of the required Oath of Supremacy. He then became a schoolmaster in Tideswell.

Garlick seems to have been schoolmaster at Tideswell for some six or seven years. An anonymous writer, quoted in Hayward, says that he taught "with great love, credit, and no small profit to his scholars." Three of his pupils became priests; one of them, Christopher Buxton, was himself later martyred, while another, Robert Bagshaw, witnessed his teacher's martyrdom, and ended his life as President of the English Benedictine Congregation.

== The priesthood ==
Garlick entered the English College at Rheims on 22 June 1581. He was ordained as a priest at the end of March 1582, and left for the English Mission on 25 January 1583. Little is known of his arrival or his early work there, but he was arrested and banished along with seventy-two other priests in 1585. He arrived at Rheims on 17 October that year; two days later, he was on his way back to England.

Garlick's second ministry in England lasted over two and a half years. The Douai Diary reports that he was in London in April 1586. A spy's report from 16 September 1586 says that he "laboureth with diligence in Hampshire and Dorsetshire." A government list of recusants for March 1588 announces his presence in Derbyshire.

== Arrest and trial ==
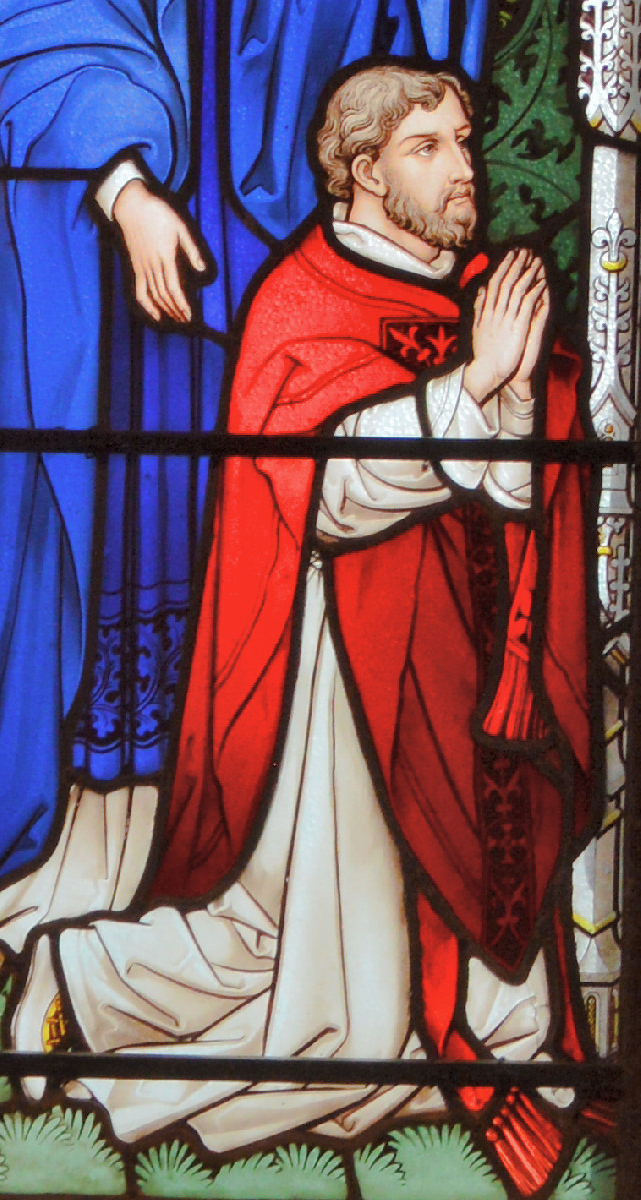
Nicholas Garlick praying

He was finally arrested with fellow priest Robert Ludlam on 12 July 1588 at Padley, at the home of the famous recusant family the FitzHerberts. The house was raided by George Talbot, Earl of Shrewsbury, who was looking for John FitzHerbert; the finding of two priests as well was, according to Connelly, "an unexpected bonus". Garlick and Ludlam, John FitzHerbert, his son Anthony, three of his daughters, Maud, Jane, and Mary, and ten servants were arrested, and taken to jail.

In Derby Gaol, Ludlam and Garlick met with another priest, Richard Simpson, who had been earlier condemned to death but had been granted a reprieve, either, as stated by most sources, including Challoner, because he had given some hope that he would attend a Protestant service, or, as suggested by Sweeney, because the Queen may have given orders to halt the persecution of priests to reduce the threat of invasion from Spain. Whether or not Simpson was wavering, he remained firm after his meeting with Garlick and Ludlam.

On 23 July 1588, the three priests were tried for coming into the kingdom and "seducing" the Queen's subjects. Garlick, who acted as spokesman, answered, "I have not come to seduce, but to induce men to the Catholic faith. For this end have I come to the country, and for this will I work as long as I live." A second altercation with the Bench came when Garlick was asked if he wished to be tried by jury or by the Justices of Assize alone. Garlick, knowing that a verdict of guilty was inevitable, replied that he did not wish his blood to be on the hands of poor men. He was, however, persuaded to yield on this point, and the trial proceeded by jury. The three priests were found guilty of treason, and were condemned to be hanged, drawn and quartered; the sentences were to be carried out the next day: "That you and each of you be carried to the place from whence you came, and from thence be drawn on a hurdle to the place of execution, and be there severally hanged, but cut down while you are alive; that your privy members be cut off; that your bowels be taken out and burnt before your faces; that your heads be severed from your bodies; that your bodies be divided into four-quarters, and that your quarters be at the Queen's disposal; and the Lord have mercy on your souls."

As the three priests left the dock, Garlick exclaimed, "I thought that Cain would never be satisfied till he had the blood of his brother Abel."

== Execution ==
Henry Garnet, cited in Sweeney, recounts that the priests spent their last night in the same cell as a woman condemned to death for murder, and that in the course of the night they reconciled her to the Catholic faith. She was hanged with them the next day.

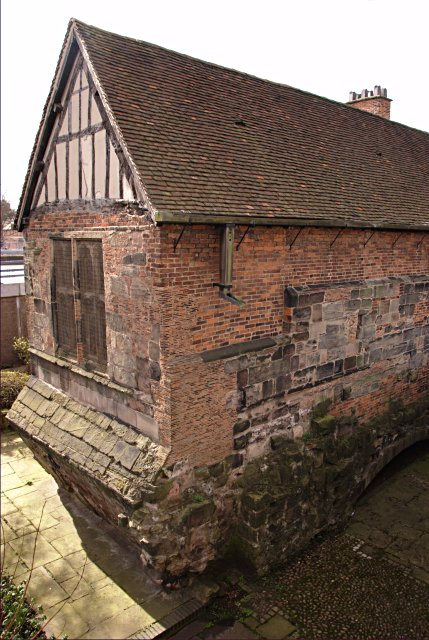
The Chapel of St Mary on the Bridge was there at the time and today has a plaque recording Garlick's death. The bridge has gone but its remains can be seen beneath the chapel.

On 24 July 1588, the three priests were placed on hurdles and drawn to St Mary's Bridge, where the executions were to be carried out. Garlick remained witty and cheerful to the end. A passer-by reminded him that they had often gone shooting together, to which Garlick replied, "True, but now I am to shoot off such a shot as I never shot in all my life". When they arrived at the bridge, the cauldron was not ready for burning the entrails. According to Sweeney, "[t]his sort of bungling was frequent in provincial executions; the local men were amateurs, unversed in the ritual of butchery."

Garlick used the time to give the people a long sermon on the salvation of their souls, ignoring the attempts of officials to make him stop. He closed his speech by throwing into the crowd a number of papers which he had written in prison, and which he said would prove what he affirmed. Bede Camm reports a tradition that everyone into whose hands these papers fell was subsequently reconciled to the Catholic Church. Simpson was apparently to have been executed first, but reports state that Garlick hastened to the ladder before him and kissed it, going up first, either because, as suggested by Anthony Champney, Simpson was showing some signs of fear, or, as suggested by Challoner, Garlick suspected that there was a danger that his companion's courage might fail him. Simpson was executed next, and, according to an eyewitness, "suffered with great constancy, though not with such (remarkable) signs of joy and alacrity as the other two". Ludlam was the last of the three to be executed, and is reported to have stood smiling while the execution of Garlick was being carried out, and to have continued smiling when his own turn came.

== After his death ==
A poem by an anonymous writer, who seems to have witnessed the executions, describes the scene as follows:

When Garlick did the ladder kiss,
And Sympson after hie,
Methought that there St. Andrew was
Desirous for to die.

When Ludlam lookèd smilingly,
And joyful did remain,
It seemed St. Stephen was standing by,
For to be stoned again.

And what if Sympson seemed to yield,
For doubt and dread to die;
He rose again, and won the field
And died most constantly.

His watching, fasting, shirt of hair;
His speech, his death, and all,
Do record give, do witness bear,
He wailed his former fall.

The heads and quarters of the three priests were placed on poles in various places around Derby. Garlick's student, Robert Bagshaw, writes as follows: "And the penner of this their martyrdoms, who was also present at their deaths, with two other resolute Catholick gentlemen, going in the night divers miles, well weaponed, took down one of their heads from the top of a house standing on the bridge, the watchmen of the town (as was afterwards confessed) seeing them and giving no resistance. This they buryed with as great decencie as they could, and soon after the rest of the quarters were taken away secretly by others."

Dr. Cox, a Derbyshire historian writing in the second half of the nineteenth century, and quoted by Sweeney, mentions a tradition that Garlick's head was buried in the churchyard at Tideswell. It has never been found.

The three priests were declared venerable in 1888, and were among the eighty-five martyrs of England and Wales beatified by Pope John Paul II on 22 November 1987.

== See also ==
- Douai Martyrs
