= Grindleford =

Village in the Peak District, England

Coordinates: 53.292°N 1.638°W

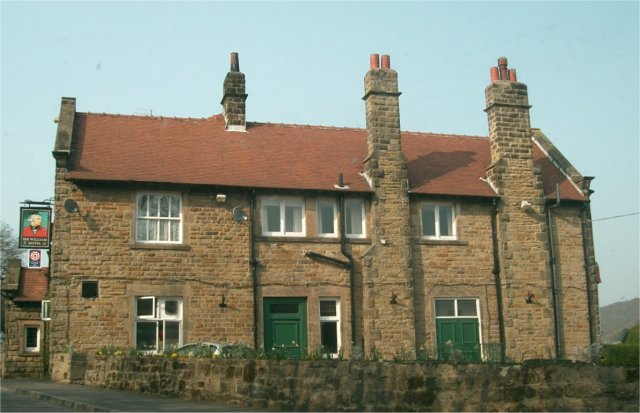
- Sir William Hotel, 2005

- Location within Derbyshire
- Population: 909 (2011)
- Civil parish: Grindleford
- District: Derbyshire Dales
- Shire county: Derbyshire
- Region: East Midlands
- Country: England
- Sovereign state: United Kingdom
- Post town: HOPE VALLEY
- Postcode district: S32
- Dialling code: 01433
- Police: Derbyshire
- Fire: Derbyshire
- Ambulance: East Midlands
- UK Parliament: Derbyshire Dales

Grindleford is a village and civil parish in the county of Derbyshire, in the East Midlands of England. The population of the civil parish as taken at the 2011 Census was 909. It lies at an altitude of 492 feet (150 m) in the valley of the River Derwent in the Peak District National Park. The 17th-century Grindleford Bridge crosses the river on the western side of the village.

On the west side of the valley is the 1,407 feet (429 m) high Sir William Hill, and to the south-east lies the gritstone escarpment of Froggatt Edge. Grindleford became a parish in 1987, merging the parishes of Eyam Woodlands, Stoke, Nether Padley and Upper Padley.

The nearest city to Grindleford is Sheffield, the centre of which is about 12 miles (19 km) away. For rail travellers, the Sheffield suburb of Totley is less than four miles away at the other end of the Totley Tunnel, the second-longest rail tunnel in the UK. Grindleford railway station (actually located in Upper Padley, half a mile away from the village) is at the western portal of the rail tunnel, on the scenic Hope Valley Line between Sheffield and Manchester.

Grindleford is popular with walkers and climbers due to its proximity to a variety of landscapes, including open moorland, wooded river valleys (including Padley Gorge), several gritstone escarpments, and the broad Hope Valley. Visitors seeking refreshment are well catered for by a number of establishments, including the Sir William Hotel, the Maynard Hotel and Bar, the National Trust Longshaw Estate Visitor Centre, and Grindleford Station Cafe (in the old station house).

== Education ==
The village has one school, Grindleford Primary School. It was rated as "good" in its March 2018 Ofsted report.

Hope Valley College runs a course in Painting and Drawing at Grindleford Pavilion.

== Sport ==
=== Football ===
Grindleford Football Club are based on Bishop Pavilion and Bridge Playing Field adjacent to the River Derwent off Main Road, north Grindleford. The club currently competes in the Hope Valley Amateur League and a junior section in the Derwent Valley League.

=== Cricket ===
Grindleford Cricket Club and ground is also based on Bishop Pavilion and Bridge Playing Field. The club have three senior teams: a 1st XI Saturday team that competes in the Yorkshire and Derbyshire Cricket League, a Sunday XI team that plays friendly matches in and around the region, and a Midweek XI side.

== Media ==
Local television programmes are provided by both BBC Look North and BBC East Midlands Today on BBC One and by ITV News Calendar and ITV News Central on ITV1. Local radio stations are BBC Radio Derby, Capital Midlands and Greatest Hits Radio Derbyshire (High Peak) (formerly High Peak Radio). The village's local newspaper is the Peak Advertiser.

== Padley Chapel ==
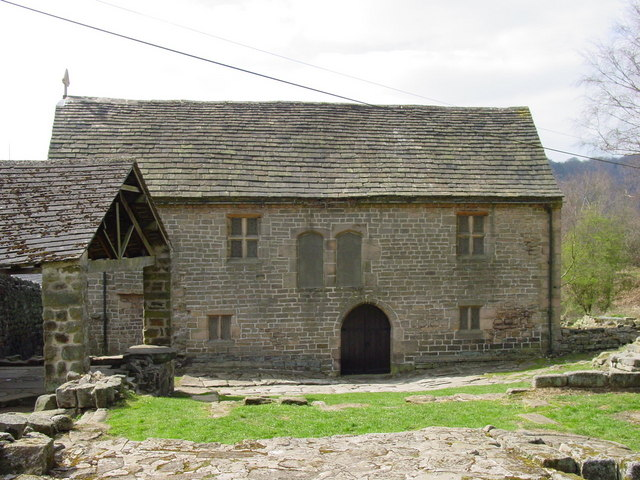
The chapel and remains of Padley Hall

Padley Hall (or Padley Manor) was a large double courtyard house where, in 1588, two Catholic priests (Nicholas Garlick and Robert Ludlam) were discovered and then, two weeks later, hanged, drawn and quartered in Derby. They became known as the 'Padley Martyrs'. Padley Hall today is mostly in ruins, although part of it – probably originally the central gatehouse range – survives, and in 1933 was converted to a Roman Catholic chapel in honour of the martyrs. This was after the chapel had been a site of pilgrimage for several years, annual pilgrimages having been set up by a priest from Sheffield. Organisation was taken on by the Guild of Our Lady of Ransom, and pilgrims walked from the nearby station to honour the Padley Martyrs.

The chapel, a Grade I listed building, stands not far from the railway line.

== See also ==
- Listed buildings in Grindleford
- Rowan Rheingans
