= Derby Gaol =

Group of structures in Derby, England, UK, which have served as jails

Coordinates: 52°55′29″N 1°29′14″W

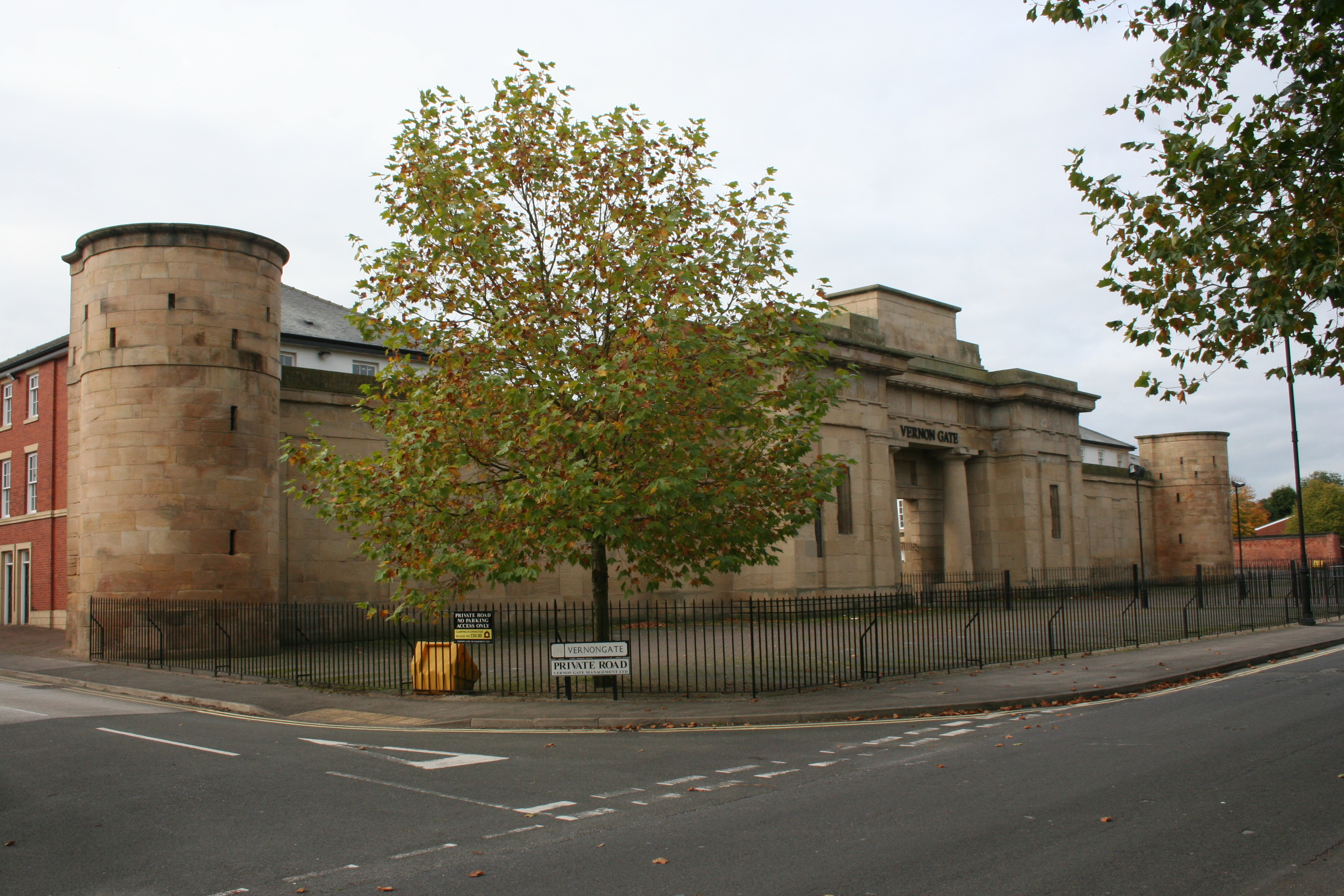
New County Gaol (Vernon Street Prison)

The term Derby Gaol historically refers to the five jails in Derby, England. Today, the term usually refers to one of two small 'tourist attractions', the jail which stood on Friar Gate from 1756 to 1846 and the cells of which still exist and are open to the public. Their possible location, size and function have been assigned for the attraction, alongside a modern kitchen and bar. The 1843 to 1929 Vernon Street Prison whose frontage can still be seen today, has been redeveloped for modern commercial use.

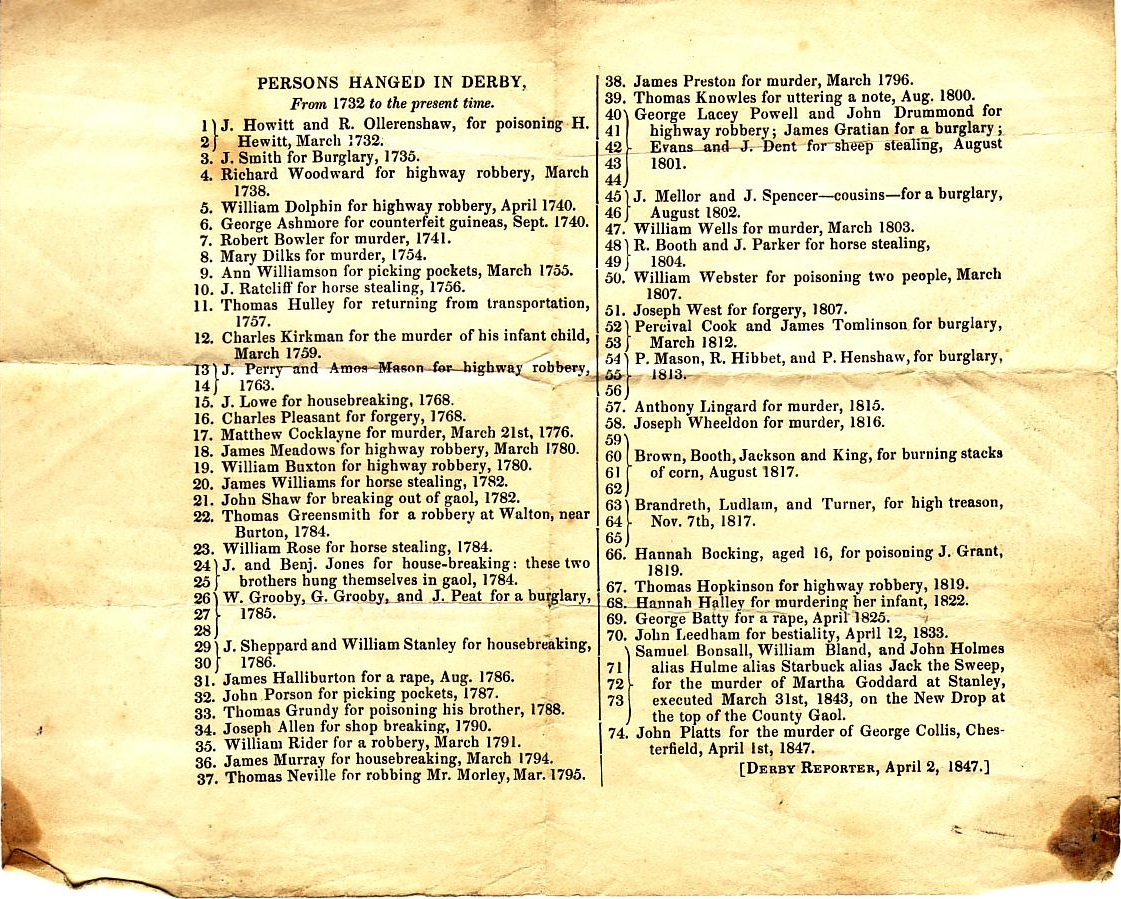
Derby Gaols Hangings, 1732 to 1847. This sheet was (apparently) made available to satisfy the interest of Derby residents on the occasion of the hanging of John Platts the previous day. (Click image to enlarge and read)

== History ==
In 1652 the Cornmarket Gaol (no longer extant) was the site of the imprisonment of George Fox on charges of blasphemy. Fox became the founder of the Christian denomination the Religious Society of Friends, perhaps better known as the Quakers. It has been alleged that Judge Bennett of Derby first used the term Quaker to describe the movement, as they bid him to 'quake for fear of the Lord', but the phrase had already been used in the context of other religious groups so the etymology is dubious.

== Friar Gate Gaol ==
Derby Gaol Act 1756
- Act of Parliament
- Parliament of Great Britain
- Long title: An Act for re-building the Common Gaol for the County of Derby, upon a Place called Nun's Green, in the Liberty of the Town of Derby; and for appointing a proper Place for the safe Custody of Prisoners till such new Gaol shall be compleated; and to empower the Justices of the Peace for the said County to pay the Rent reserved to the Corporation for the said Ground, out of the County Rates.
- Citation: 29 Geo. 2. c. 48
- Territorial extent: Great Britain

Dates
- Royal assent: 9 March 1756
- Commencement: 13 November 1755 (Note: Start of session.)
- Repealed: 30 July 1948
Other legislation
Repealed by	Statute Law Revision Act 1948

Status: Repealed

Text of statute as originally enacted

The building of the Friar Gate Gaol was authorised by the Derby Gaol Act 1756 (29 Geo. 2. c. 48). The gaol was site of many hangings, and the small attraction today displays reproduction newspaper accounts of the executions on the walls, a replica of a gallows which stood in front of the building can be located in the small garden of the jail. The police museum has subsequently closed.

== The New County Gaol (Vernon Street Prison) ==
The Vernon Street Prison served as the county gaol from 1843 to 1919. The last public execution at Derby of Richard Thorley for the murder of Eliza Morrow took place here in 1862. The last person to be hanged was William Slack on 16 July 1907 for the murder of Lucy Wilson.

From 1919 to 1929 the prison acted as a military prison. It was then decommissioned. Following demolition, the site served as Derby Greyhound Stadium, and today contains offices, though the historical facade still remains.

== Notable prisoners ==
- Jeremiah Brandreth – high treason
- Humphrey Berisford – recusant
